= List of recipients of the Hanseatic Cross =

The Hanseatic Cross (Hanseatenkreuz) was a decoration of the three Hanseatic city-states of Bremen, Hamburg and Lübeck, who were members of the German Empire during World War I. Each republic established its own version of the cross between August and September 1915, but the design and award criteria were similar for each. The cross was awarded for distinguished war service without regard to rank or social status, and could be awarded to civilians as well as military personnel. When awarded for bravery or combat merit, it was the three cities' equivalent of the Iron Cross of Prussia.

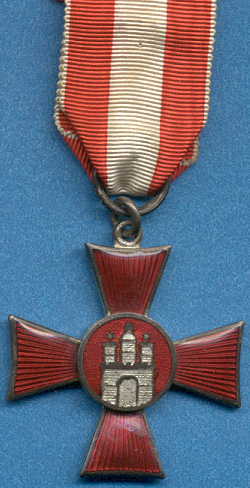
Hamburg (obverse)

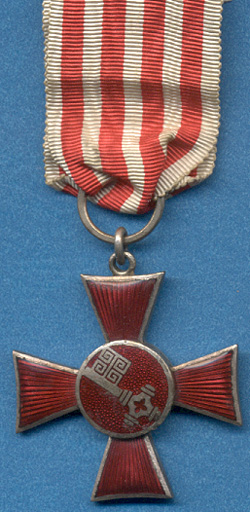
Bremen (obverse)

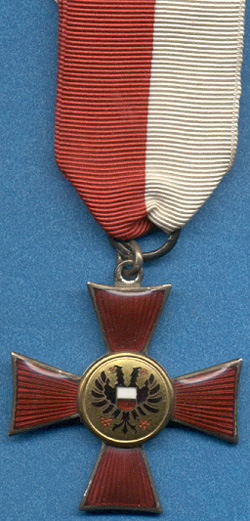
Lübeck (obverse)

The Hanseatic Crosses of World War I

== Recipients ==
There were approximately 50,000 awards of the Hanseatic Cross of Hamburg, the largest Hanseatic city. The Bremen Hanseatic Cross was awarded approximately 20,000 times. Lübeck was the smallest of the Hanseatic cities, and its Hanseatic Cross was awarded approximately 8,000–10,000 times. Selected recipients are listed below.

=== Triple holders ===
- Max Bastian – Admiral in World War II
- Max von Boehn – Colonel General
- Eduard von Capelle – Admiral and State Secretary of the Imperial Naval Office
- Franz von Hipper – Admiral and commander of the High Seas Fleet
- Prince Leopold of Bavaria
- Felix von Luckner – Corvette Captain and commerce raider
- Karl August Nerger – Captain at Sea and commerce raider
- Manfred von Richthofen – Rittmeister and fighter ace
- Rupprecht, Crown Prince of Bavaria
- Ludwig von Schröder – Admiral
- Otto von Stülpnagel – General of Infantry in World War II
- Wilhelm II, German Emperor

=== Double holders ===
- Ludwig Beck – (Bremen and Hamburg), Colonel General in World War II
- Fedor von Bock – (Bremen and Hamburg), General Field Marshal in World War II
- Felix Graf von Bothmer – (Bremen and Lübeck), Colonel General
- Hermann Densch – (Hamburg and Lübeck), Admiral in World War II
- Theodor Endres – (Hamburg and Lübeck), General of Artillery in World War II
- Nikolaus von Falkenhorst – (Bremen and Hamburg), Colonel General in World War II
- Wilhelm Heye – (Hamburg and Lübeck), Colonel General and head of the Reichswehr Army Command
- Henning von Holtzendorff – (Bremen and Hamburg), Grand Admiral and chief of the Imperial Admiralty Staff
- Hans Howaldt – (Hamburg and Lübeck), Captain at Sea and submarine commander
- Leonhard Kaupisch – (Bremen and Hamburg), General of Aviators in World War II
- Wilhelm Keitel – (Bremen and Hamburg), General Field Marshal in World War II
- Friedrich Koch – (Bremen and Hamburg), General of Infantry in World War II
- Wilhelm Ritter von Leeb – (Bremen and Hamburg), General Field Marshal in World War II
- Hermann Meyer-Rabingen – (Bremen and Hamburg), Lieutenant General in World War II
- Walther Reinhardt – (Bremen and Hamburg), Major General, head of the Reichswehr Army Command and Prussian Minister of War
- Helmuth von Ruckteschell – (Bremen and Hamburg), Captain at Sea and commerce raider
- Ludwig von Schröder – (Bremen and Hamburg), General of Flak Artillery of the Luftwaffe in World War II
- Adolf Strauss – (Bremen and Lübeck), Colonel General in World War II
- Hans-Jürgen Stumpff – (Hamburg and Lübeck), Colonel General in World War II
- Erich von Tschischwitz – (Hamburg and Lübeck), General of Infantry in the Reichswehr
- Ernst Udet – (Bremen and Lübeck), Colonel General of the Luftwaffe in World War II

=== Bremen ===
- Prince Adalbert of Prussia
- Conrad Albrecht – General Admiral in World War II
- Harald Auffarth – Lieutenant Colonel and fighter ace
- Werner von Blomberg – General Field Marshal in World War II
- Werner von Fritsch – Colonel General in World War II
- Fritz Fullriede – Major General in World War II
- Petar Ganchev – Bulgarian Major General
- Walter Lohmann – Captain at Sea in the Reichsmarine
- Fritz von Lossberg – General of Infantry
- Erich Lüdke – General of Infantry in World War II
- Georg Meyer – Second Lieutenant and fighter ace
- Carl Rodenburg – Lieutenant General in World War II
- Hans Rose – Captain at Sea in World War II
- Alfred von Tirpitz – Grand Admiral and State Secretary of the Imperial Naval Office

=== Hamburg ===
- Richard Ackermann – Counter Admiral
- Günther Angern – Lieutenant General in World War II
- Wilhelm von Apell – Lieutenant General in World War II
- Lothar von Arnauld de la Perière – Vice Admiral in World War II
- Hans-Jürgen von Arnim – Colonel General in World War II
- Kurt Aßmann – Vice Admiral in World War II
- Walter Assmann – Lieutenant General in World War II
- Gustav Bachmann – Admiral
- Ernst-Günther Baade – Lieutenant General in World War II
- Paul Bader – General of Artillery in World War II
- Curt Badinski – Lieutenant General in World War II
- Hermann Bauer – Admiral and commander of submarines
- Hans Behlendorff – General of Artillery in World War II
- Hans-Georg Benthack – Major General in World War II
- Hans Berr – First Lieutenant and fighter ace
- Helmuth Beukemann – Lieutenant General in World War II
- Erich Bey – Rear Admiral in World War II
- Bruno Bieler – General of Infantry in World War II
- Georg von Bismarck – Lieutenant General in World War II
- Friedrich von Boetticher – General of Artillery in World War II
- Walter von Boltenstern – Lieutenant General in World War II
- Adolf von Brauchitsch – Major General in the Reichswehr
- Hermann Breith – General of Armored Troops in World War II
- Wilhelm Burgdorf – General of Infantry in World War II
- Carl Casper – Lieutenant General in World War II
- Wolfgang von Chamier-Glisczinski – Lieutenant General in World War II
- Friedrich Christiansen – Captain at Sea and naval fighter ace, General of Aviators in World War II
- Erich-Heinrich Clößner – General of Infantry in World War II
- Ludwig Crüwell – General of Armored Troops in World War II
- Karl Decker – General of Armored Troops in World War II
- Paul Deichmann – General of Aviators in World War II
- Paul Drekmann – Lieutenant General in World War II
- Kurt Eberhard – Major General and SS-Brigadeführer in World War II
- Johann-Heinrich Eckhardt – Lieutenant General in World War II
- Prince Eitel Friedrich of Prussia
- Otto Elfeldt – Lieutenant General in World War II
- Alexander von Falkenhausen – General of Infantry in World War II
- Wilhelm Falley – Lieutenant General in World War II
- Gustav Fehn – General of Armored Troops in World War II
- Otto Feige – Admiral in World War II
- Hellmuth Felmy – General of Aviators in World War II
- Paul Fenn – Captain at Sea in World War II
- Edgar Feuchtinger – Lieutenant General in World War II
- Wolfgang Fischer – General of Armored Troops in World War II
- Hermann Flörke – Lieutenant General in World War II
- Otto-Wilhelm Förster – General of Engineers in World War II
- Walther Forstmann – submarine commander during World War II
- James Franck – First Lieutenant and physicist
- Bruno Frankewitz – Lieutenant General in World War II
- Wilhelm Frankl – Lieutenant and fighter ace
- Maximilian Fretter-Pico – General of Artillery in World War II
- Kurt Fricke – Admiral in World War II
- Friedrich Fromm – Colonel General in World War II
- Hans Freiherr von Funck – General of Armored Troops in World War II
- Curt Gallenkamp – General of Artillery in World War II
- Friedrich Gempp – Major General in World War II
- Hermann Geyer – General of Infantry in World War II
- Werner von Gilsa – General of Infantry in World War II
- Walter Gladisch – Admiral in World War II
- Karl von Graffen – Lieutenant General in World War II
- Horst Großmann – General of Infantry in World War II
- Curt Haase – Colonel General in World War II
- Siegfried Haenicke – General of Infantry in World War II
- Siegfried Handloser – Generaloberstabsarzt in World War II
- Hermann von Hanneken – General of Infantry in World War II
- Erick-Oskar Hansen – General of Cavalry in World War II
- Paul von Hase – Lieutenant General in World War II
- Otto Hasse – General of Infantry in the Reichswehr
- Wilhelm Hasse – General of Infantry in World War II
- Arthur Hauffe – General of Infantry in World War II
- Gotthard Heinrici – Colonel General in World War II
- Walter Heitz – Colonel General in World War II
- Otto Herfurth – Major General in World War II
- Traugott Herr – General of Armored Troops in World War II
- Friedrich Herrlein – General of Infantry in World War II
- Kurt Herzog – General of Artillery in World War II
- Gustav Höhne – General of Infantry in World War II
- Rudolf Holste – Lieutenant General in World War II
- Friedrich Hoßbach – General of Infantry in World War II
- Hermann Hoth – Colonel General in World War II
- Helmuth Huffmann – Lieutenant General in World War II
- Max Immelmann – First Lieutenant and fighter ace
- Hans Jordan – General of Infantry in World War II
- Max Jüttner – SA-Obergruppenführer and SA-Stabsführer
- Otto Kähler – Counter Admiral in World War II
- Rudolf Kaempfe – General of Artillery in World War II
- Gerhard Kauffmann – Lieutenant General in World War II
- Georg Keppler – SS-Obergruppenführer in World War II
- Paul Ludwig Ewald von Kleist – General Field Marshal in World War II
- Carl-Erik Koehler – General of Cavalry in World War II
- Waldemar Kophamel – submarine commander
- Gustav Kleikamp – Vice Admiral in World War II
- Robert Kosch – General of Infantry
- Heinrich Krampf – Lieutenant General in World War II
- Friedrich Freiherr Kress von Kressenstein – General of Artillery in the Reichswehr
- Hans Kreysing – General of Mountain Troops in World War II
- Georg von Küchler – General Field Marshal in World War II
- Friedrich Kühn – General of Armored Troops in World War II
- Walter Kuntze – General of Engineers in World War II
- Werner Lange – Vice Admiral in World War II
- Hans Langsdorff – Captain at Sea and commerce raider in World War II
- Hans Leistikow – Major General in World War II
- Joachim Lemelsen – General of Armored Troops in World War II
- Magnus von Levetzow – Counter Admiral in the Reichsmarine
- Theo-Helmut Lieb – Lieutenant General in World War II
- Fritz Lindemann – General of Artillery in World War II
- Max Lindig – Lieutenant General in World War II
- Walther Lucht – General of Artillery in World War II
- Max Ludwig – General of Artillery in the Reichswehr
- Günther Lütjens – Admiral in World War II
- Oswald Lutz – General of Armored Troops in World War II
- Friedrich Lützow – Vice Admiral in World War II
- Erich von Manstein – General Field Marshal in World War II
- Erich Marcks – General of Artillery in World War II
- Gerhard Matzky – General of Infantry in World War II, lieutenant general in the Bundeswehr
- Wilhelm Meisel – Admiral in World War II
- Otto von Moser – Lieutenant General
- Georg Alexander von Müller – Admiral and Chief of the Imperial Naval Cabinet
- Wolfgang Muff – General of Infantry in World War II
- Friedrich-Wilhelm Neumann – Lieutenant General in World War II
- Hermann Niehoff – General of Infantry in World War II
- Ferdinand Noeldechen – Lieutenant General in World War II
- Hans von Obstfelder – General of Infantry in World War II
- Erich Petersen – General of Aviators in World War II
- Hans Pfundtner – State Secretary in the Reich Interior Ministry
- Heinz Piekenbrock – Lieutenant General in World War II
- Adolf Raegener – Lieutenant General in World War II
- Heinz von Randow – Lieutenant General in World War II
- Heino von Rantzau – Lieutenant General in World War II
- Walther von Reichenau – General Field Marshal in World War II
- Hermann Reinecke – General of Infantry in World War II
- Ludwig von Reuter – Admiral and commander of the High Seas Fleet
- Lothar von Richthofen – First Lieutenant and fighter ace
- Kurt Röpke – General of Infantry in World War II
- Curt Rothenberger – State Secretary in the Reich Ministry of Justice
- Edwin Graf von Rothkirch und Trach – General of Cavalry in World War II
- Hans Röttiger – General of Armored Troops in World War II
- Günther Rüdel – Colonel General in World War II
- Alfred Saalwächter – General Admiral in World War II
- Ferdinand Schaal – General of Armored Troops in World War II
- Hans Schmidt – General of Infantry in World War II
- Kurt Schmidt – Lieutenant General in World War II
- Otto von Schrader – Admiral in World War II
- Walther Schroth – General of Infantry in World War II
- Albrecht Schubert – General of Infantry in World War II
- Hans von Seeckt – Colonel General and head of the Reichswehr Army Command
- Gustav Sieß – Lieutenant General of the Luftwaffe in World War II
- Walther von Seydlitz-Kurzbach – General of Artillery in World War II
- Hermann Ritter von Speck – General of Artillery in World War II
- Hans Stohwasser – Vice Admiral in World War II
- Carl-Heinrich von Stülpnagel – General of Infantry in World War II
- Peter Strasser – Frigate Captain and commander of naval zeppelins
- Ernst Thälmann – Artilleryman, later leader of the Communist Party of Germany and the Roter Frontkämpferbund
- August Thiele – Vice Admiral in World War II
- Fritz Thiele – Lieutenant General in World War II
- Joachim von Tresckow – Lieutenant General in World War II
- Horst Julius Freiherr Treusch von Buttlar-Brandenfels – Colonel in World War II
- Walter von Unruh – General of Infantry in World War II
- Friedrich Völtzer – Second Lieutenant
- Martin Wandel – General of Artillery in World War II
- Walter Warzecha – General Admiral and last Commander-in-Chief of the Kriegsmarine in World War II
- Georg Wetzell – General of Infantry and Chief of the Reichswehr Truppenamt
- Paul Fritz Wiemann – Nazi Party official in World War II
- Erwin von Witzleben – General Field Marshal in World War II
- Albert Wodrig – General of Artillery in World War II
- Eberhard Wolfram – Vice Admiral in World War II

=== Lübeck ===
- Paul Behncke – Admiral and State Secretary of the Imperial Naval Office
- Karl Boy-Ed – Captain at Sea and the imperial naval attaché to the United States
- Karl von Bülow – General Field Marshal
- Kurt Dittmar – Lieutenant General in World War II
- Waldemar Erfurth – General of Infantry in World War II
- Hans Feige – General of Infantry in World War II
- Hermann Frommherz – fighter ace and Luftwaffe Major General in World War II
- Eberhard Godt – Admiral in World War II
- Kurt von Hammerstein-Equord – Colonel General in World War II
- Otto Hersing – Corvette Captain
- Ulrich Kessler – General of Aviators in World War II
- Gustav Kieseritzky – Vice Admiral in World War II
- Ewald von Lochow – General of Infantry
- Karl Mauss – Lieutenant General in World War II
- Curt von Morgen – General of Infantry
- Karlgeorg Schuster – Admiral in World War II
- Joachim von Siegroth – Major General in World War II
- Heinrich von Vietinghoff – Colonel General in World War II
- Ernst von Weizsäcker – State Secretary of the Foreign Ministry and ambassador to the Holy See in World War II

=== Unknown version ===
- Rüdiger Graf von der Goltz – First Lieutenant
- Carl Langhein – Lieutenant at Sea
- Hans Reese – Lieutenant at Sea
- Walter Stennes – Second Lieutenant

== See also ==
- Hanseatic Cross
- Orders, decorations, and medals of Imperial Germany
