= Otto von Brandenstein =

German general

Otto Freiherr von Brandenstein
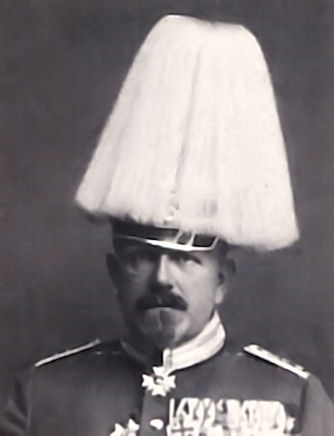
- Born: 21 October 1865; Hohenstein near Friedland, Grand Duchy of Mecklenburg-Strelitz, German Empire
- Died: 8 May 1945 (aged 79); Estate Grambow near Goldberg, German Reich
- Relatives: ∞ 1896 Elisabeth Auguste Friederike Julie von Passow
- Military career
- Allegiance: Kingdom of Prussia; German Empire
- Branch: Prussian Army; Imperial German Army
- Service years: 1885–1919
- Rank: Generalleutnant
- Conflicts: First World War; Finnish Civil War
- Awards: Iron Cross
- Other work: Lord of the Manor (Gut Grabow)

Otto Hans Karl August Freiherr von Brandenstein (21 October 1865 – 8 May 1945) was a German officer. On 27 August 1939, Tannenbergtag, he received the Charakter (brevet) as honorary Lieutenant General of the Wehrmacht.

== Life ==
Freiherr von Brandenstein joined the Prussian Army as an officer candidate in 1885 and served with the 2nd Grand Ducal Mecklenburg Dragoon Regiment No. 18 in Parchim. He was promoted to Oberstleutnant in 1913. During World War I, Brandenstein served in the Western Front as a staff officer under the command of the generals Gustav Freiherr von Hollen and Eberhard von Claer.

In 1918, Colonel Freiherr von Brandenstein was the commander of the brigade-sized cavalry unit Detachment Brandenstein which landed in Loviisa, Finland on 3 April. The detachment served in the Finnish Civil War and fought on the side of the Finnish Whites. After the Battle of Lahti, the unit was attached to the Baltic Sea Division.

Colonel von Brandenstein was awarded the Pour le Mérite on 15 May 1918 and promoted to Major General on 18 October 1918. He resigned from the German Army on 27 February 1919.

== Death ==
On 8 May 1945, lord of the manor Otto Freiherr von Brandenstein and his estate secretary were murdered (shot and killed) by Soviet troops and buried in a trench by the Bolsheviks. The two were later recovered and buried in the cemetery of the village church in Unter Brüz.

Baroness von Brandenstein was dispossessed and forced to leave Mecklenburg with her two daughters, who had been living with her and had endured terrible violations (rape). The family Bible remained in the Goldberg rectory. After German reunification, the valuable heirloom was returned to her granddaughter Gisela von Dallwitz in Hamburg in 1990.

== Family ==
Otto was the son of Werner Hans Georg Joachim Freiherr von Brandenstein (b. 6 March 1826 in Galenbeck; d. 22 January 1906 in Niendorf near Kleinen) and his wife Minka Auguste Caroline Henriette, née von Arnim (b. 26 September 1840 at Gut Neuensund, Uckermark; d. 25 June 1919 in Niendorf). His father was a retired Rittmeister First Class in the Austo-Hungarian Imperial and Royal Army and co-owner of the fiefdoms of Hohenstein and Heinrichswalde. His mother was the daughter of the lord of the manor Hans Carl Friedrich von Arnim (b. 25 November 1789; d. 26 November 1861) and his wife Auguste Wilhelmine Sophie Marie, née von Heyden (b. 25 April 1818; d. 5 January 1899). Otto had six siblings.

=== Marriage ===
First Lieutenant von Brandenstein married his fiancée Elisabeth Auguste Friederike Julie von Passow (b. 19 April 1873 at Estate Grambow; d. 1959 in Malente) on 19 June 1896 in Grabow. The marriage produced five children:

- Ilse Margarete Minka Marie (b. 12 August 1898 in Düsseldorf); ∞ September 1920 Otto von Dallwitz
- Margarethe Therese Elisabeth Johanna (b. 23 June 1900 in Berlin)
- Marie Martha Lilla Wolfine Andrea Johanna (b. 24 November 1902 in Coblenz)
- Irmgard Minka Christine Carola Victoria (b. 24 September 1904 in Berlin)
- August Werner David Rudolf Georg (b. 22 September 1905 in Demmin)
  - Werner Freiherr von Brandenstein was killed in action on 8 August 1944, as a captain of the reserves on the Eastern Front west of Szafranow.

== Promotions ==
- 10.9.1885 Fahnenjunker
- 15.4.1886 Portepée-Fähnrich
- 15.1.1887 Sekonde-Lieutenant
- 27.1.1895 Premier-Lieutenant
- 14.9.1900 Hauptmann / Rittmeister (designation depending on position)
- 22.3.1907 Major
- 1.10.1913 Oberstleutnant
- 18.8.1915 Oberst
- 18.10.1918 Generalmajor
- 27.8.1939 Charakter als Generalleutnant (honorary Lieutenant General)

== Awards and decorations ==
- Order of the Crown (Prussia), 4th Class
- Centenary Medal (Prussia), 1897
- Order of the Griffon (Mecklenburg), Knight's Cross (MG3)
- Order of the Zähringer Lion, Knight's Cross 2nd Class with Oak Leaves (BZ3bmE)
- Order of the Red Eagle, 4th Class
- Order of the Crown (Prussia), 3rd Class
- Military Merit Order (Bavaria), 4th Class with the Crown (BMV4mKr)
- Order of the Griffon (Mecklenburg), Cross of Honor (MG2c)
- Prussian Long Service Cross
- Iron Cross (1914), 2nd and 1st Class
- Hessian Medal for Bravery (HT)
- Military Merit Cross (Mecklenburg-Schwerin), 1st Class (MMV1)
- Friedrich August Cross, 2nd and 1st Class (OK1)
- Military Merit Cross (Austria-Hungary), 3rd Class with War Decoration (ÖM3K)
- Military Merit Order (Bavaria), 3rd Class Prussian Order of the Crown, 2nd Class with Swords and the Crown (BMV3XKr)
- Order of the Crown (Prussia), 2nd Class with Swords
- Pour le Mérite on 15 May 1918 as Colonel and Commander of the Landing Detachment "Brandenstein"
- Finnish Order of the Cross of Liberty, 1st Class with Swords
- Commemorative Medal of the War of Liberation 1918
- The Honour Cross of the World War 1914/1918 with Swords

== Bibliography ==
- Das Garde-Dragoner-Regiment 1. Großherzoglich Hessisches Nr. 23 [The Guard Dragoon Regiment 1st Grand Ducal Hessian No. 23], 1914–1919, Wittich 1931
