= Otto Feige =

Otto Feige may refer to:

- Otto Feige (naval officer), German admiral in command of the operation to transfer German cruiser Lützow to the Soviet Union in 1939
- A possible identity of B. Traven
