= Kurt Aßmann =

German admiral (1883–1962)

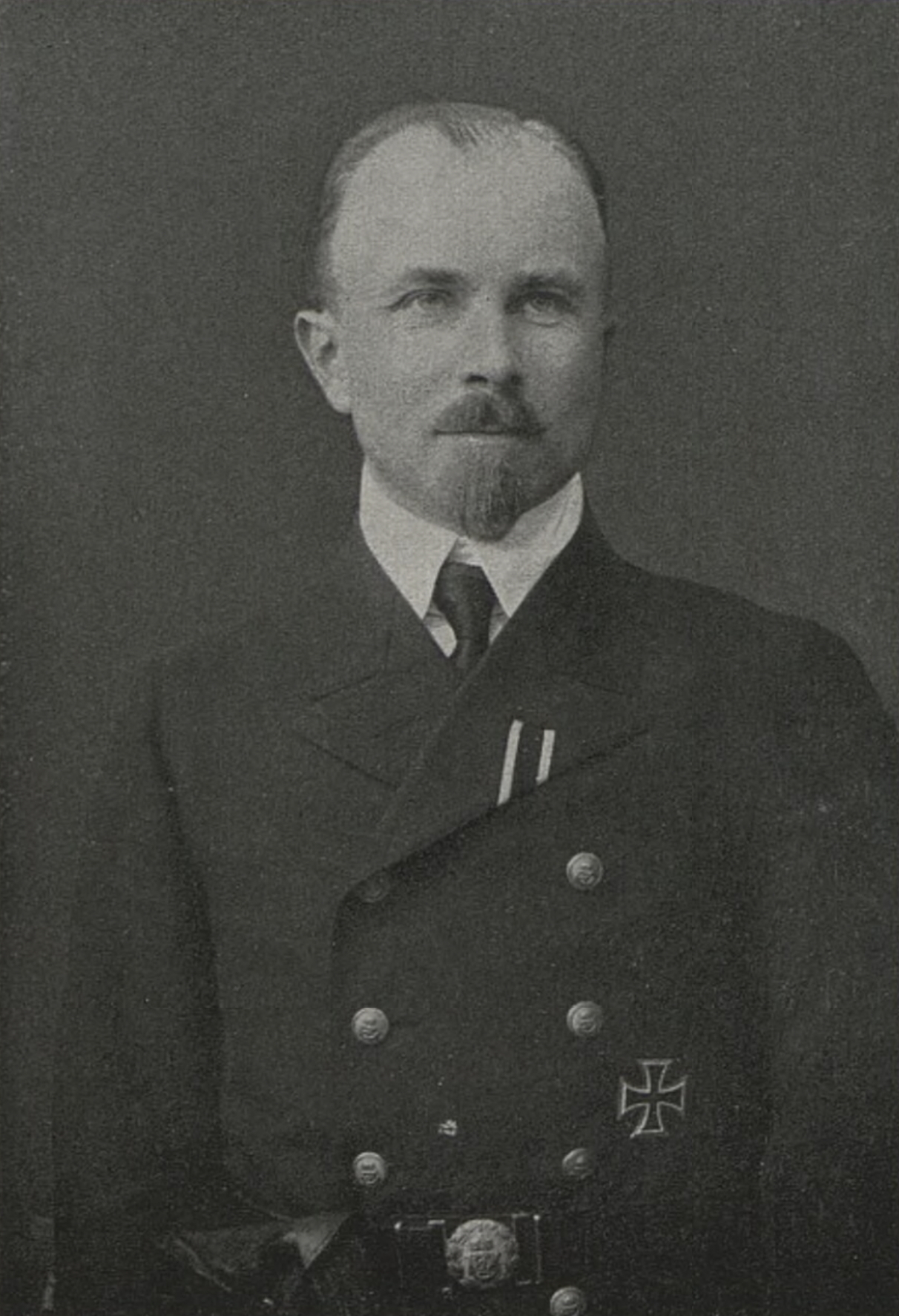
- Born: 13 July 1883; Naumburg, German Empire
- Died: 26 July 1962 (aged 79); Bad Homburg, West Germany
- Military career
- Allegiance: German Empire; Weimar Republic; Nazi Germany
- Branch: Imperial German Navy; Reichsmarine; Kriegsmarine
- Service years: 1901–1943
- Rank: Vizeadmiral
- Units: Military Archives, OKM
- Commands: Torpedo boat Flotilla, Flanders
- Awards: Order of the Crown; Knight's Cross of the House Order of Hohenzollern; Iron Cross (1914) 2nd and 1st class

Kurt Aßmann (13 July 1883 – 26 July 1962) was a German career naval officer who served in both world wars, rising to the rank of Vizeadmiral during World War II before retiring as a department head in the Kriegsmarine high command in 1943.

== Naval career ==
Aßmann was born at Naumburg in the Prussian Province of Saxony in 1883 and entered the Imperial German Navy in 1901. He served throughout World War I and, at the end of the war, he was a Kapitänleutnant commanding the Torpedo boat Flotilla Flanders. He remained in the post-war Reichsmarine, attaining the rank of Konteradmiral in October 1932. Aßmann was chief of the Naval Archives department in the Marineleitung (naval command) from April 1933. When the department was reorganized as the Department of War Science in the Oberkommando der Marine (OKM – the naval high command) in January 1936, he remained as its head. He continued in this role during much of World War II, and was promoted to Vizeadmiral on 1 January 1941. Aßmann retired at the end of June 1943.

== Awards and decorations ==
- Order of the Crown 4th class
- Knight's Cross of the House Order of Hohenzollern with swords
- Iron Cross (1914) 2nd and 1st class
- Service Award Cross of Prussia
- Order of the Zähringen Lion 2nd class with oak leaves and swords
- Hanseatic Cross of Hamburg
- Friedrich-August-Kreuz 2nd and 1st class
- Princely Reuss Honour Cross 3rd class with crown and swords
- Honour Cross of the World War 1914/1918
- War Merit Cross 1st and 2nd class with swords

== Sources ==
- Shirer, William L. (1960). The Rise and Fall of the Third Reich. New York: Simon & Schuster. LCCN 60-6729.
- Webb, James Jack (2024). Generals and Admirals of the Third Reich: For Country or Fuehrer. Vol. 1: A–G. Havertown, PA: Casemate Publishers. ISBN 978-1-952-71512-9.
