= Gladisch =

Gladisch is a German language surname. Notable people with the name include:

- Silke Gladisch (born 1964), German athlete
- Walter Gladisch (1882–1954), German admiral
