= Gustav Kieseritzky =

German World War II Admiral (1893-1943)

- Born: 22 September 1893; Rendsburg, German Empire
- Died: 19 November 1943 (aged 50); Kerch Peninsula, Soviet Union
- Military career
- Allegiance: German Empire; Weimar Republic; Nazi Germany
- Branch: Imperial German Navy; Reichsmarine; Kriegsmarine
- Service years: 1912–1943
- Rank: Vizeadmiral
- Commands: Battleship Schleswig-Holstein; Commanding admiral, Black Sea
- Conflicts: World War I World War II: Kerch–Eltigen Operation †
- Awards: Knight's Cross of the Iron Cross; German Cross in gold

Gustav Kieseritzky (22 September 1893 – 19 November 1943) was a German career naval officer who served in the Imperial German Navy, the Reichsmarine and the Kriegsmarine. As an admiral during World War II, he was a recipient of the Knight's Cross of the Iron Cross of Nazi Germany. Kieseritzky was killed on 19 November 1943 during the Kerch–Eltigen Operation and was posthumously awarded the Knight's Cross, on 20 November 1943.

== World War I and the interwar years ==
Kieseritzky was born at Rendsburg in 1893 and joined the Imperial German Navy in 1912. He served in World War I and, by the end of the war, he was an Oberleutnant zur See serving as a staff officer of the High Seas Fleet. He remained in the post-war Reichsmarine from 1919 and the Kriegsmarine from 1935. After serving as the first officer on the battleship Schleswig-Holstein, he was posted to the Reich Ministry of War (later OKW) as a department head from March 1936 to June 1938. He returned to the Schleswig-Holstein as its commanding officer from June 1938 to April 1939.

== World War II ==
During World War II, Kieseritzky first served, until June 1940, as the chief of staff of the Naval Signals Inspectorate in the Oberkommando der Marine (OKM), the naval high command. He next was named as the naval commandant of Brest, France until December 1940, and then commander of all sea fortifications in Brittany until June 1942. At that time, he was appointed as the commander of the German Bight, followed in February 1943 as the commanding admiral of the Black Sea, a post he held until he was killed in action against Soviet forces in November. Kieseritzky was promoted to Konteradmiral in September 1941 and to Vizeadmiral in March 1943.

== Awards and decorations ==
- Iron Cross (1914) 1st and 2nd class
- Friedrich-August-Kreuz 1st and 2nd class
- Hanseatic Cross of Lübeck
- Gallipoli Star
- Honour Cross of the World War 1914/1918
- Clasp to the Iron Cross (1939) 1st and 2nd class
- German Cross in gold (20 October 1943)
- Wound Badge (1939) in gold
- Knight's Cross of the Iron Cross on 20 November 1943 as Vizeadmiral and commanding admiral, Black Sea

== Sources ==
- Fellgiebel, Walther-Peer (2000) [1986]. Die Träger des Ritterkreuzes des Eisernen Kreuzes 1939–1945 — Die Inhaber der höchsten Auszeichnung des Zweiten Weltkrieges aller Wehrmachtteile [The Bearers of the Knight's Cross of the Iron Cross 1939–1945 — The Owners of the Highest Award of the Second World War of all Wehrmacht Branches] (in German). Friedberg, Germany: Podzun-Pallas. ISBN 978-3-7909-0284-6.
- Webb, James Jack (2024). Generals and Admirals of the Third Reich: For Country or Fuehrer. Vol. 2: H–O. Havertown, PA: Casemate Publishers. ISBN 978-1-952-71517-4.

Military offices
Preceded by Kapitän zur See Hans Feldbausch	Commanding officer, German battleship Schleswig-Holstein; 8 June 1938 – 25 April 1939	Succeeded by Kapitän zur See Gustav Kleikamp
