= Order of the Crown (Prussia) =

Prussian order of chivalry (1861–1918)

Royal Order of the Crown (Königlicher Kronen-Orden)
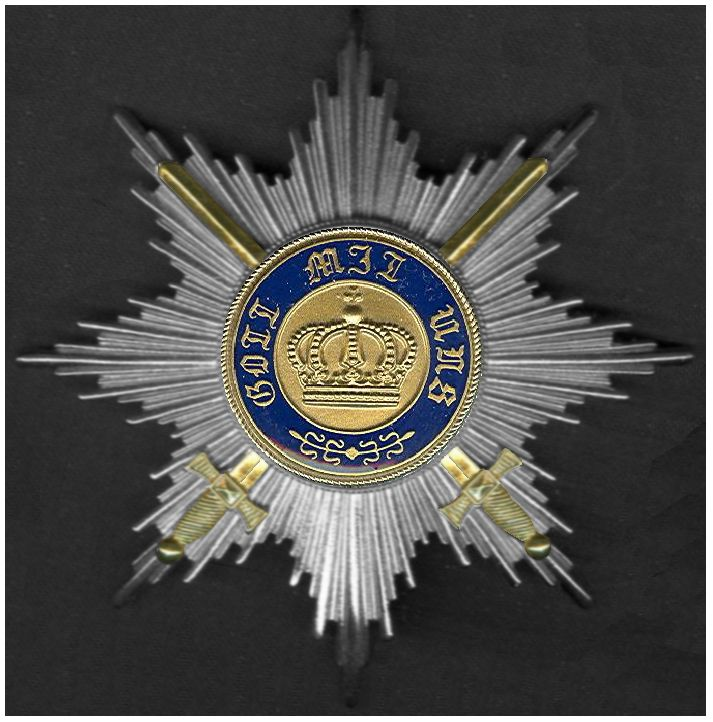
- 1st class breast star of the Order of the Crown, with swords

Awarded by The Kingdom of Prussia
- Type: State Order
- Motto: Gott mit uns (God with us)
- Eligibility: Military officers and civilians, Prussian and foreign, with rank/status determining which class one received
- Criteria: Merit
- Status: Obsolete
- Founder: Wilhelm I
- Classes: I–IV

Statistics
- First induction: 18 October 1861
- Last induction: 1918
- Total inductees: c. 133,000

Precedence
- Next (higher): Order of the Red Eagle
- Next (lower): House Order of Hohenzollern
- Original ribbon of the order

The Royal Order of the Crown (German: Königlicher Kronen-Orden) was an order of chivalry of the Prussian monarchy equivalent in precedence to the older Order of the Red Eagle. It was conferred on qualified military officers and civilians, in recognition of meritorious service, from its establishment in October 1861 until the fall of the monarchy at the end of World War I in November 1918. There were multiple classes in the order, and it was conferred over 133,000 times.

== Establishment ==
The Royal Order of the Crown was instituted by the Prussian king (and later German emperor) Wilhelm I on 18 October 1861, the day of his coronation. According to its founding decree, the order was ranked equally in terms of precedence with the older Order of the Red Eagle, which had been founded in 1792 by King Frederick William II.

== Criteria for eligibility ==
The order rewarded meritorious service to the monarchy or the state in both war and peacetime, and was also used to recognize longstanding service. It could be conferred on only commissioned military officers or civilians of approximately equivalent status. It could be bestowed upon both subjects of the Prussian crown and foreigners. Recipients of lower classes of the order remained eligible to receive higher classes, and multiple awards were not uncommon.

== Classes ==
There were four classes of the order. In addition, a distinction was made within the 2nd class order, which could be conferred with or without a breast star.

- 1st class
- 2nd class mit stern (with star)
- 2nd class
- 3rd class
- 4th class

== Description of the insignia ==
=== Badge ===
The badge of the order was a cross pattée with curved arms. The arms were enameled in white featuring golden border lines within the arms, except for the 4th class cross, which was not enameled. The obverse central medallion depicted a royal crown surrounded by a blue enameled ring bearing the order's motto in capital letters: GOTT MIT UNS (God [is] with us). Early on, there were three differing designs of the crown depicted within the medallion, but the third and last design was established in January 1869 and lasted until the discontinuation of the order in 1918. The reverse central medallion bore the founder's monogram WR and the founding date – Den 18 October 1861 – on the blue enameled ring.

The addition of crossed swords in the center was mandated for merit in the face of the enemy for wartime awards. Recipients of wartime awards who were subsequently awarded a higher class during peacetime received a badge featuring crossed swords placed above the cross, known as "swords on the ring". On 22 June 1871, Wilhelm I decreed that members of the voluntary medical service during the Franco-Prussian War were to be awarded the 3rd or 4th class of the order, featuring a red cross on a white enamel background superimposed on the upper arm of the cross.

=== Breast Star ===
A breast star also was awarded to all 1st class recipients and to approximately 30 percent of the 2nd class recipients. This was an eight-pointed star for the 1st class and a four-pointed one for the 2nd class, both with straight rays. In its center, the breast star displayed the obverse medallion of the order's badge with the crown and motto. It also bore the crossed swords for appropriate wartime awards.

=== Materials ===
The badges (crosses) of the 1st through the 3rd classes were made of hollow gold from 1861 to 1916, and of gilt silver from 1917 to 1918, during the last years of World War I. The badge of the 4th class was always made of gilt bronze. The center medallions were made of gilt silver from 1861, of gold from 1863 to 1916 and of gilt silver again from 1917 to 1918. The bodies of the stars were made of solid silver, while the medallion elements were gold until 1916 and gilt silver from 1917 to 1918. The swords were gilt silver. As a rare special mark of favor, the insignia of the 1st and 2nd classes could also be set "with brilliants" – meaning the order's badge was partially set with cut diamonds, while the body of the breast star was entirely covered with them.

=== Ribbons ===
The founding decree specified that the ribbon of the order was to be dark blue moire. This has been described as dark cornflower blue (reportedly the King's favorite color), though a lighter medium blue was utilized from March 1865 onward.

Subsequent directives created a variety of ribbons for certain categories of the order. An order issued by Wilhelm I on 22 April 1864, mandated that the awards of insignia with swords to civilian recipients were to have a black ribbon with white edging. For a peacetime upgrade to a previously held wartime decoration involving the addition of swords on the ring, the ribbon featured two black and three white stripes with black edging. However, these regulations did not apply to the 1st class, which retained the ribbon color prescribed by the founding statute.

Under the same order, military recipients were awarded the insignia with swords on a white ribbon with black edging for wartime service earned under enemy fire, and were awarded the insignia without swords on the same ribbon pattern for wartime service earned other than under enemy fire. On 22 June 1871, Wilhelm I issued a royal decree stipulating that the 3rd and 4th class insignia awarded for meritorious acts outside the 1870–1871 theater of war were henceforth to be worn on a white ribbon with six black stripes and red edging. Under this same decree, decorations bearing the medical red cross were also to be worn on this ribbon.

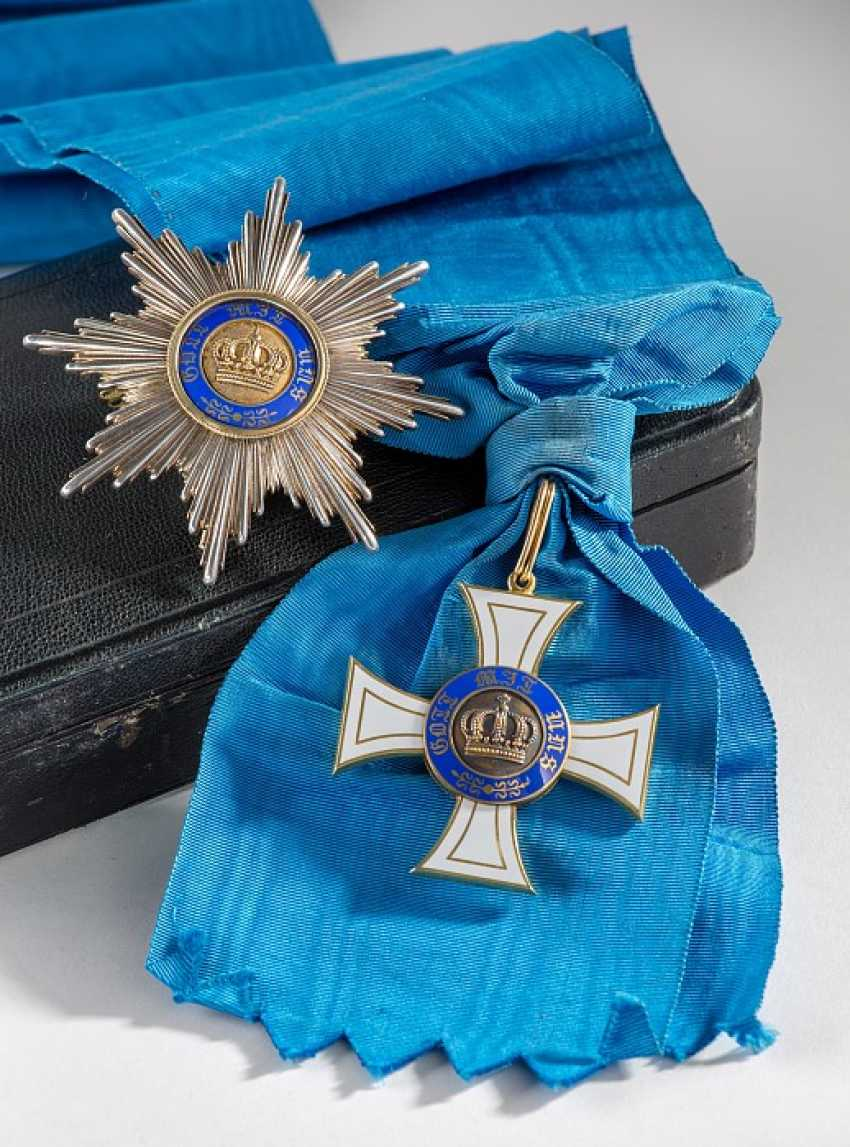
1st class badge with breast star and shoulder ribbon

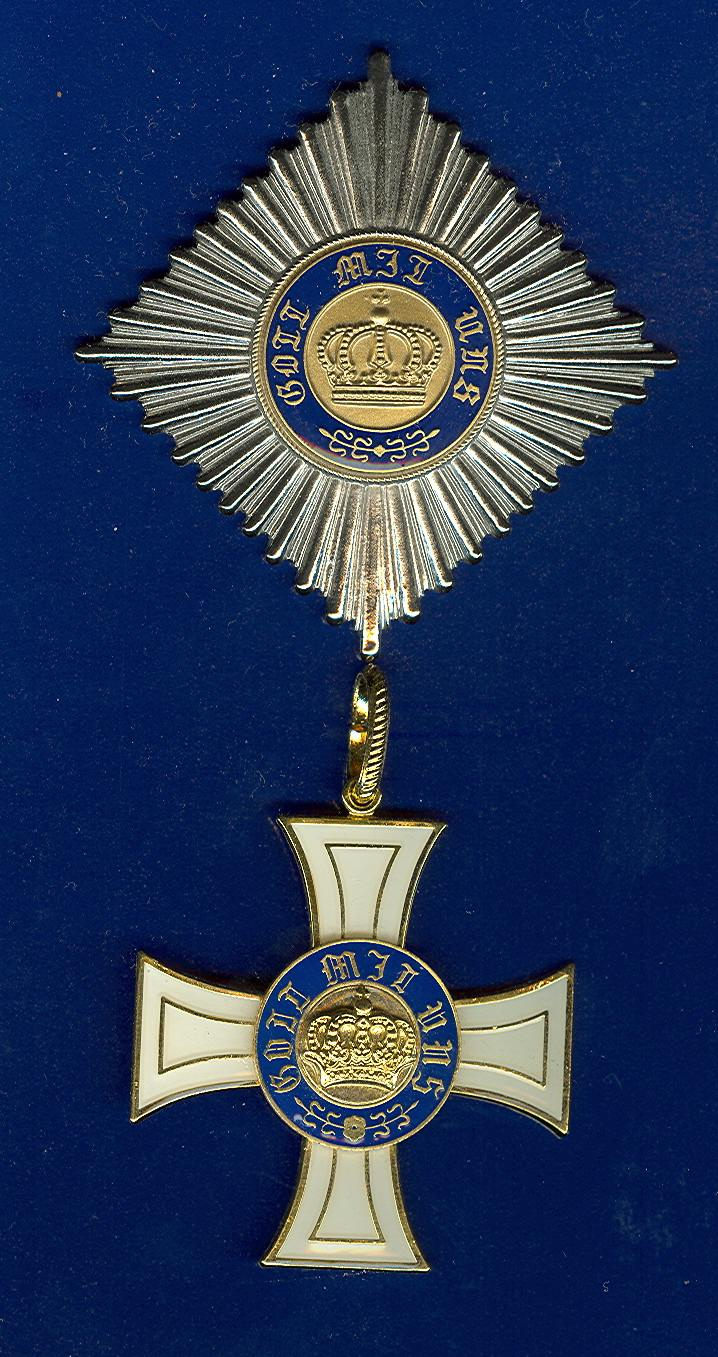
2nd class badge with breast star

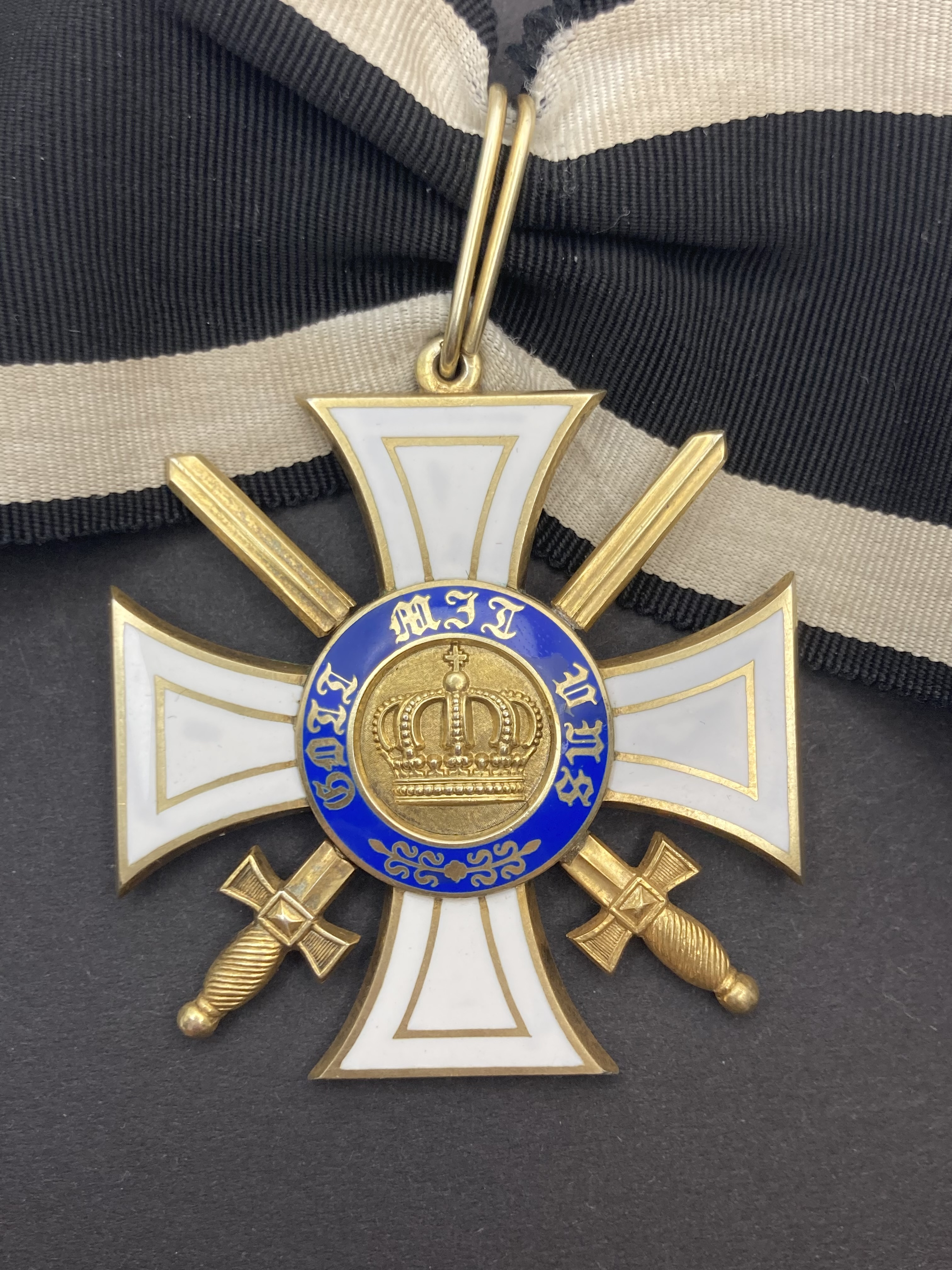
2nd class badge with swords and neck ribbon

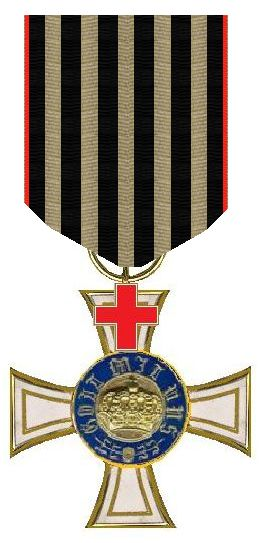
3rd class badge with medical red cross

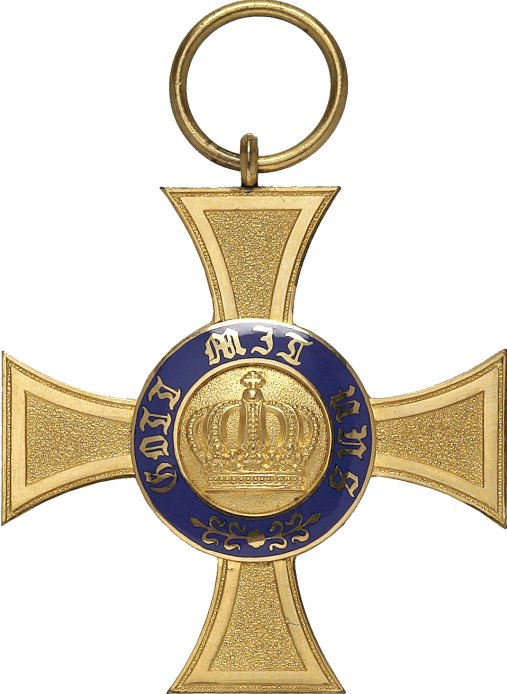
4th class badge

== Manner of wear ==
- For the 1st class, in accordance with the founding decree of 18 October 1861, the order cross (approximately 60–62 mm in diameter) was worn on a dark blue moire ribbon – four inches (approximately 100 mm) wide – extending from the right shoulder to the left hip. Additionally, an eight-pointed breast star (approximately 90 mm in diameter) was worn on the left breast. By royal decree of 8 March 1862, the manner of wearing the ribbon was changed to extend from the left shoulder to the right hip.
- For the 2nd class, the order cross (approximately 49–51 mm in diameter) was worn on a two-inch (approximately 50 mm) wide ribbon around the neck. When awarded with the star, a four-pointed breast star (approximately 78–81 mm in diameter) was also worn on the left breast.
- For the 3rd class, the order cross (approximately 42 mm in diameter) was worn on a one-and-a-half-inch (approximately 38 mm) wide ribbon in the buttonhole according to the founding decree, though in practice it was worn on the left breast.
- For the 4th class, the order cross without enameled arms (approximately 42 mm in diameter) was worn on a one-and-a-half-inch wide ribbon in the buttonhole according to the founding decree, though in practice it was worn on the left breast.

== Conferral totals by class ==
- The 1st class was awarded 28 times between 1861 and 1862, 81 times between 1863 and 1868, 2,352 times between 1869 and 1916 and 91 times between 1917 and 1918, for a total of 2,553 conferrals.
- The 2nd class was awarded 100 times (37 with star) between 1861 and 1862, 422 times (101 with star) between 1863 and 1868, 12,105 times (3,674 with star) between 1869 and 1916 and 840 times (202 with star) between 1917 and 1918, for a total of 13,467 conferrals (4,014 with star).
- The 3rd class was awarded 221 times from 1861 to 1862, 1,508 times from 1863 to 1868, 28,341 times from 1869 to 1916 and 1,004 times from 1917 to 1918, for a total of 31,074 conferrals.
- The 4th class was awarded 488 times from 1861 to 1862, 55,878 times from 1863 to 1868, 28,341 times from 1869 to 1916 and 1,227 times from 1917 to 1918, for a total of 85,934 conferrals.

== Discontinuation of the order ==
With the proclamation of the republic on 9 November 1918 and the abdication of the Hohenzollern monarchy, the issuance of royal Prussian orders of chivalry, including the Royal Order of the Crown, was discontinued.

== Lists of selected recipients ==
The following lists enumerate a selection of individuals who were conferred membership of the order in its several classes, in order of precedence. The date of award is displayed, if known. This is only a partial listing and may expand over time.

=== 1st class ===
- Prince Adalbert of Prussia – third son of Wilhelm II, German Emperor
- Mustafa Kemal Atatürk – Ottoman general, later first president of Turkey (27 March 1918)
- Prince August Wilhelm of Prussia – fourth son of Wilhelm II, German Emperor (27 January 1897)
- Felix Graf von Bothmer – Generaloberst in World War I
- Karl von Bülow – Generalfeldmarschall in World War I
- Leo von Caprivi – Chief of the Imperial German Navy and later Chancellor of the German Empire (22 March 1884)
- Adolf von Deines – General of the Cavalry and diplomat (19 September 1901)
- Hermann von Eichhorn – Generalfeldmarschall in World War I (17 January 1904)
- Prince Eitel Friedrich of Prussia second son of Wilhelm II, German Emperor (7 July 1893)
- Otto von Emmich – General of the Infantry in World War I
- Ludwig von Falkenhausen – Generaloberst and military governor-general of occupied Belgium in World War I (15 January 1899)
- Frederick III, German Emperor – (18 October 1861)
- John Fullerton, British admiral and courtier, awarded with brilliants, (January 1903)
- James Grierson, British lieutenant-colonel, British military attaché at Berlin – (1901) (previous 2nd class in 1899 in connection with the visit of Emperor Wilhelm II to the United Kingdom)
- Erich von Gündell – General of the Infantry in World War I
- Ian Hamilton – British major general and military secretary (September 1902) on a visit to Prussia for German Army maneuvers.
- Robert Hart – British baronet and diplomat (1900)
- Hans Heinrich XV, Prince of Pless – Silesian nobleman and diplomat (4 December 1911)
- Prince Henry of Prussia – younger brother of Wilhelm II, German Emperor
- Henning von Holtzendorff – Grand Admiral in World War I
- Max Honsell – engineer, professor and politician in the Grand Duchy of Baden (12 May 1908)
- Ōyama Iwao – Japanese field marshal (4 February 1884)
- Prince Joachim of Prussia – youngest son of Wilhelm II, German Emperor
- August von Mackensen – Generalfeldmarschall in World War I
- Edwin Freiherr von Manteuffel – Generalfeldmarschall in the Franco-Prussian War (19 January 1867)
- John McNeill – British major general (1899) – in connection with the visit of Emperor Wilhelm II to the United Kingdom.
- Adolphe Max – Mayor of Brussels (1910)
- Helmuth von Moltke the Elder – Generalfeldmarschall and chief of the Prussian General Staff (14 August 1864)
- Helmuth von Moltke the Younger – Generaloberst and chief of the Great General Staff in World War I
- Georg Alexander von Müller – Admiral and chief of the German Imperial Naval Cabinet in World War I
- Prince Oskar of Prussia – fifth son of German Emperor Wilhelm II (27 May 1898)
- Hans von Plessen – Generaloberst and adjutant-general to Wilhelm II
- Oswald Freiherr von Richthofen – Secretary of Foreign Affairs (December 1902)
- Albrecht von Roon – Prussian Minister of War (18 October 1861)
- Alfred de Rothschild – English banker and director of the Bank of England
- Jagatjit Singh – Maharaja of Kapurthala (1911)
- Alfred von Schlieffen – Generalfeldmarschall and chief of the Great General Staff
- Victor Spencer, 1st Viscount Churchill – British nobleman and courtier (1899), in connection with the visit of Wilhelm II to the United Kingdom
- Léo d'Ursel – Belgian diplomat
- Alfred von Waldersee – Generalfeldmarschall and chief of the Great General Staff (22 March 1884)
- Wilhelm, German Crown Prince – eldest son of Wilhelm II, German Emperor (6 May 1892)
- Wilhelm I – German Emperor (18 October 1861)
- Wilhelm II – German Emperor (27 January 1869)
- Friedrich Graf von Wrangel – Generalfeldmarschall and Prussian commander in the Second Schleswig War
- Fabian Jakob Wrede – Swedish nobleman, lieutenant general and scientist (1861)
- Ferdinand von Zeppelin – General of the Cavalry and inventor of the Zeppelin rigid airship

=== 2nd class with star ===
- Gustav Bachmann – Admiral and chief of the German Imperial Admiralty Staff in World War I
- William Balck – Generalleutnant in World War I (1917)
- Kurt von dem Borne – General of the Infantry in World War I
- William Carington – Comptroller and Treasurer to the Prince of Wales (January 1902) during the visit to Berlin of the Prince for the birthday of Emperor Wilhelm II
- Emil du Bois-Reymond – Professor of Physiology at the University of Berlin
- Karl von Einem – Generaloberst, Prussian Minister of War prior to World War I and an army commander in the war
- Georg Fuchs – a Generalleutnant in World War I
- Georg von Hertling – Chancellor of Imperial Germany during World War I
- Franz Conrad von Hötzendorf – an Austrian Feldmarschall and chief of the Austro-Hungarian General Staff in World War I
- Karl Ledderhose – 3rd class (1 October 1864); 2nd class (1877); 2nd class with star (17 September 1884)
- Alexander von Linsingen – Generaloberst in World War I
- Kuno von Moltke – Generalmajor, commandant of Berlin, adjutant to Wilhelm II and a principal in the Eulenburg affair
- Oskar Potiorek – Austrian General of the Artillery and the governor of Bosnia and Herzegovina when Archduke Franz Ferdinand was assassinated
- Friedrich von Schele – Generalleutnant and governor-general of German East Africa (10 June 1899)
- Alfred von Tirpitz – Grand Admiral and State Secretary of the German Imperial Naval Office

=== 2nd class ===
- Richard Ackermann – Kapitän zur See in World War I
- Theobald von Bethmann Hollweg – Imperial German Chancellor during World War I
- Friedrich Boedicker – Vizeadmiral in World War I
- Christopher Cradock – British Admiral in World War I (1901) for actions in the Boxer Rebellion
- Charles Cust – Equerry to the Prince of Wales (January 1902), during the visit to Berlin of the Prince for the birthday of Wilhelm II
- Erich von Falkenhayn – General of the Infantry, Prussian Minister of War and chief of the Great General Staff in World War I
- Franz von Hipper – Admiral and commander of the High Seas Fleet in World War I
- James Robert Johnstone – British lieutenant colonel (May 1902), in recognition of his services in China during the Boxer Rebellion
- Robert Kosch – General of the Infantry in World War I (18 January 1909)
- Friedrich Freiherr Kress von Kressenstein – General of the Artillery in World War I, later commanded Group Command 2 in the Reichswehr
- Henry Legge, British colonel and courtier (January 1903)
- Magnus von Levetzow – Kommodore and chief of staff in the Naval High Command in World War I
- Alfred Meyer-Waldeck – Kapitän zur See and commander of the garrison at Tsingtao in World War I, later a Vizeadmiral
- James Reid – British physician and baronet (1901) during the visit of Wilhelm II for the funeral of Queen Victoria
- Ludwig von Reuter – Admiral in World War I who ordered the scuttling of the High Seas Fleet at Scapa Flow
- Erich von Tschischwitz – general staff officer in World War I, as a General of the Infantry he commanded Group Command 1 in the Reichswehr

=== 3rd class ===
- Ernst von Bibra – naturalist and author (1869)
- Karl Boy-Ed – naval intelligence officer and naval attaché to the U.S. in World War I
- Otto von Brandenstein – Generalmajor in World War I
- Wilhelm Heye – Generaloberst and chief of the Reichswehr army high command (10 September 1910)
- Eugen Landau – banker, philanthropist and diplomat (1899)
- Paul von Lettow-Vorbeck – Generalmajor and commander of forces in German East Africa in World War I
- Robert Loyd-Lindsay, 1st Baron Wantage – British nobleman awarded with the Cross of Geneva following the Franco-Prussian War, for work with British National Society for Aid to the Sick and Wounded in War
- Otto von Moser – Generalleutnant and corps commander in World War I (7 February 1907)
- Hugo Schäffer – government councilor and politician in the Kingdom of Württemberg (1912)
- Hans von Seeckt – Generalmajor and a staff officer in World War I, later the chief of the Reichswehr army high command
- Hermann, Prince of Solms-Hohensolms-Lich – nobleman and politician, 3rd class with red cross (8 August 1872)

=== 4th class ===
- Kurt Aßmann – Kapitänleutnant commanding a torpedo boat flotilla in World War I; a Vizeadmiral in World War II
- Fedor von Bock – Major and general staff officer in World War I and a Generalfeldmarschall in World War II (13 September 1911)
- Adolf von Brauchitsch – battalion commander in World War I, later a regimental commander in the Reichswehr
- Wilhelm Canaris – naval intelligence officer and U-boat commander in World War I and the chief of Abwehr in World War II
- Friedrich Fahnert – General of Air Signals Troops in the Luftwaffe in World War II
- Alexander von Falkenhausen – military attaché to Japan, military governor of occupied Belgium in World War II
- Hellmuth Felmy – pilot in World War I, as a General der Flieger and a corps commander in World War II, he was convicted of war crimes
- Maximilian von Laffert – General of the Cavalry in the Royal Saxon Army in World War I
- Friedrich Wilhelm von Lindeiner-Wildau – for actions in suppressing the Maji Maji Rebellion in German East Africa; as an Oberst in the Luftwaffe, he commanded Stalag Luft III (c. 1907)
- Wolfgang Muff – Major and general staff officer in World War I and a General of the Infantry in World War II
- Walter von Reichenau – Hauptmann and general staff officer in World War I and a Generalfeldmarschall in World War II
- Ludwig von Schröder – naval artillery commander in World War I and a Luftwaffe general in World War II commanding all military forces in occupied Serbia
- Walther Schwieger – Kapitänleutnant and submarine commander responsible for the sinking of the RMS Lusitania
- Ernst Freiherr von Weizsäcker – Korvettenkapitän in World War I, the State Secretary of the Foreign Ministry and ambassador to the Holy See in World War II
- Georg Wetzell – Great General Staff officer in World War I and, as a Generalleutnant, the chief of the Truppenamt in the Reichswehr
- Helmuth Wilberg – pilot in the imperial air force in World War I, he participated in the buildup of the Luftwaffe, becoming a General der Flieger in World War II

=== Unknown class ===
- Sofanor Parra, Chilean military attaché to Germany in 1900
- William H. Welch – American physician and first dean of the Johns Hopkins School of Medicine (1911)
