= Otto Feige (naval officer) =

German admiral (1882–1951)

- Born: 21 September 1882; Neisse, Province of Silesia, German Empire
- Died: 2 January 1951 (aged 68); Kaufbeuren, Bavaria, West Germany
- Military career
- Allegiance: German Empire; Weimar Republic; Nazi Germany
- Branch: Imperial German Navy; Reichsmarine; Kriegsmarine
- Service years: 1901–1942
- Rank: Admiral
- Awards: Iron Cross (1914) 2nd and 1st class War Merit Cross 2nd and 1st class with swords

Otto Feige (21 September 1882 – 2 January 1951) was a German career naval officer who served in both world wars. He was a member of the Imperial German Navy, the Reichsmarine and, lastly, the Kriegsmarine as an Admiral during World War II.

Feige was born at Neisse in the Prussian Province of Silesia (today, Nysa, Poland) on 21 September 1882. He joined the Imperial German Navy in 1901. He served as an artillery officer and took part in World War I. At the end of the war, he was a Kapitänleutnant and an artillery adviser to the submarine service. He remained in the post-war Reichsmarine, and became the Inspector for Naval Artillery between September 1932 and September 1937. During that time, he was promoted to Konteradmiral in January 1933 and Vizeadmiral in October 1935. When he retired from the navy in September 1937, he was given a brevet promotion to Admiral.

Recalled to service after the start of World War II, Feige was assigned to the office of the Naval Director of Coastal Administration. In May 1940, he was placed in command of the operation to transfer the unfinished Lützow to the Soviet Union. The Kriegsmarine provided an escort of destroyers and other vessels to protect the ship from Allied attack. Upon arrival, Feige led an advisory team that was to help the Soviets complete the ship, though the ship, which had been renamed Petropavlovsk, was still under construction when Germany invaded the Soviet Union in June 1941. In anticipation of Germany's impending attack, Feige had helped to delay the transfer of materials from Germany to complete the ship. Promoted to full Admiral on 1 September 1941, he was appointed the senior shipyard director at the Black Sea port of Nikoleyev (today, Mykolaiv) in the occupied Ukraine, a post he held from December 1941 to September 1942. He retired at the end of December 1942.

Feige died in January 1951 at Kaufbeuren in Bavaria.

== Awards and decorations ==
- Iron Cross (1914) 2nd and 1st class
- Service Award Cross of Prussia
- Hanseatic Cross of Hamburg
- Friedrich-August-Kreuz 2nd and 1st class
- Honour Cross of the World War 1914/1918
- War Merit Cross 1st and 2nd class with swords

== Sources ==
- Philbin, Tobias R. (1994). The Lure of Neptune: German-Soviet Naval Collaboration and Ambitions, 1919–1941. Columbia, SC: University of South Carolina Press. ISBN 978-0-87249-992-8.
- Hildebrand, Hans H.; Henriot, Ernest (1988). Deutschlands Admirale, 1849-1945: Die Militärischen Werdegänge der See-, Ingenieur-, Sanitäts-, Waffen- und Verwaltungsoffiziere im Admiralsrang. Vol. I. Osnabrück: Biblio. ISBN 3764814993.
- Rohwer, Jürgen; Monakov, Mikhail S. (2001). Stalin's Ocean-Going Fleet: Soviet Naval Strategy and Shipbuilding Programmes, 1935–1953. London: Frank Cass. ISBN 978-0-7146-4895-8.
- Webb, James Jack (2024). Generals and Admirals of the Third Reich: For Country or Fuehrer. Vol. 1: A–G. Havertown, PA: Casemate Publishers. ISBN 978-1-952-71512-9.
