= Hermann Bauer =

German naval Admiral (1875–1958)

- Born: 22 July 1875; Königsberg
- Died: 11 February 1958 (aged 82); Essen
- Military career
- Allegiance: German Empire; Weimar Republic
- Branch: Imperial German Navy; Reichsmarine
- Service years: 1892–1928
- Rank: Admiral
- Commands: SMS Hamburg; I. Unterseebootsflottille; SMS Westfalen; SMS Kaiser; SMS Oldenburg; SMS Nassau
- Conflicts: World War I
- Awards: Iron Cross (1st and 2nd Class) (1914); Knight's Cross of the House Order of Hohenzollern with Swords; Order of the Red Eagle (2nd Class); Hanseatic Cross; Friedrich August Cross (1st and 2nd Class); Order of the Crown (Württemberg)

Hermann Bauer (22 July 1875 – 11 February 1958) was a German naval officer who served as commander of the U-boat forces of the Kaiserliche Marine during World War I. In addition to his World War I career, Bauer is well known as the author of the book Das Unterseeboot, a treatise on the design and operation of U-boats, which was later translated into English by Hyman G. Rickover. Rickover's translation became a basic text for the US submarine service.

== Career ==
Bauer joined the Kaiserliche Marine as a cadet in April 1892, completing his basic training aboard the sailing frigate SMS Stosch, before attending the Naval Academy in 1892–1893. He continued his training on the ship SMS Moltke and the cruiser SMS Deutschland. After a second period of study at the Naval Academy in 1894-1895 Bauer was promoted to Unterleutnant zur See on 15 September 1895 and subsequently served on the battleship SMS Kurfürst Friedrich Wilhelm.

In 1897 Bauer served on the frigate SMS Preussen before transferring to the light cruiser SMS Prinzess Wilhelm as a deck officer. On 12 April 1899 he was promoted to Leutnant zur See and then served as watch officer on the torpedo training ship SMS Blücher. From October 1900 to September 1903, he served as a company officer, deck officer, first officer, and then the commander of the II. Torpedo-Abteilung ("2nd Torpedo Division"). Bauer served for more than a year as commander of the II. Torpedo-Abteilung, and was simultaneously commander of Torpedodivisionsbootes D9, Flag Lieutenant of II. Torpedobootsflottille, and Flag Lieutenant and commander of the torpedo boat S125. On 1 April 1904 he was promoted to Kapitänleutnant.

Between October 1906 and September 1908 Bauer served in the shipbuilding department of the Reichsmarineamt, and subsequently served as a navigation officer aboard the cruiser SMS Gneisenau. He was promoted to Korvettenkapitän on 16 October 1909. He served as first officer of the battleship SMS Schlesien for a year, then spent two and a half years as adjutant of the Imperial Shipyard at Wilhelmshaven.

Between November 1913 and March 1914 Bauer commanded the light cruiser SMS Hamburg. He was then transferred to the U-boat arm, where he served as commander of I. Unterseebootsflottille, and during World War I served as Führer der Unterseeboote ("Commander of Submarines") until 4 June 1917, and as such was promoted to Fregattenkapitän on 16 April 1915. On 24 July 1917 he was appointed commander of the battleship SMS Westfalen and on 14 October 1917 was promoted to Kapitän zur See. Bauer took command of the battleship SMS Kaiser on 5 August 1918, and shortly before the war's end also commanded the battleships SMS Oldenburg and SMS Nassau.

Between December 1918 and March 1919 Bauer returned to command of the II. Torpedo-Abteilung, before moving to the Naval Dockyard at Wilhelmshaven, at first serving as equipment manager, then from October 1919 as director, and as such was promoted to Konteradmiral (rear admiral) on 1 April 1922. From June to September 1923 Bauer was chief of the General Office of the Navy in the Naval High Command. On 1 October 1923 he was promoted to command of the Marinestation der Nordsee and in that capacity was promoted to Vizeadmiral (vice admiral) on 1 February 1925. On 5 October 1928 Bauer was appointed Chief of the Naval Command, but on 30 November 1928, on his promotion to Admiral, he retired.

Bauer declared himself available to the Navy on 25 July 1939, but was not called up for active military service.

== Decorations and awards ==
- Iron Cross of 1914, 1st and 2nd class
- Knight's Cross of the Royal House Order of Hohenzollern with Swords
- Order of the Red Eagle, 4th class
- Hanseatic Cross of Hamburg
- Friedrich August Cross, 1st and 2nd class
- Cross of Honour of the Order of the Crown (Württemberg)
