= Friedrich-August-Kreuz =

German WWI military/civilian award

Friedrich-August Cross Friedrich-August-Kreuz
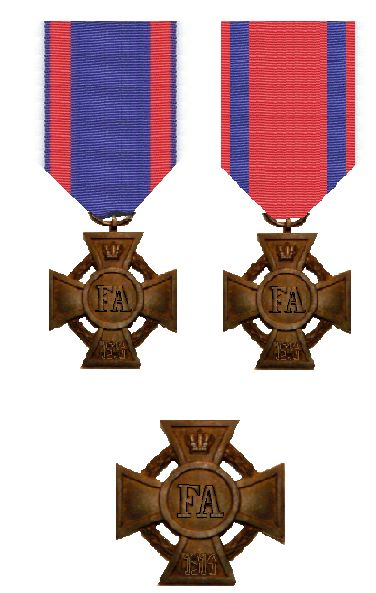
- Military Cross 2nd class (top left); Civil Cross 2nd class (top right); Cross 1st class (bottom)
- Type: Two-class medal, 2nd and 1st class
- Awarded for: Outstanding service during the war
- Description: An iron cross, encircled with a wreath, with a center medallion inscribed with the monarch's monogram, "FA". There is a crown on the upper arm and "1914" on the lower.
- Country: Grand Duchy of Oldenburg, German Empire
- Presented by: Grand Duke of Oldenburg
- Eligibility: Military and civilians
- Campaign: World War I
- Clasps: On 20 September 1918. a black iron ribbon bar was added to the 2nd class for merit at the front, inscribed "VOR DEM FEINDE" (Before the Enemy).
- Status: Obsolete
- Established: 24 September 1914
- First award: 1914
- Final award: 1918
- Ribbon (military award) Ribbon (civilian award)

The Friedrich-August Cross (German: Friedrich-August-Kreuz) was a decoration of the Grand Duchy of Oldenburg, which was a member state of the German Empire. It was established and awarded during World War I. It became obsolete with the dissolution of the grand duchy and the abdication of its monarch during the German revolution of 1918–1919.

== Establishment ==
The Friedrich-August Cross was established on 24 September 1914 by Frederick Augustus II, Grand Duke of Oldenburg, shortly after the outbreak of World War I. It was a war decoration consisting of two classes.

== Eligibility criteria ==
The decoration could be awarded to civilians as well as to military personnel. The criteria required that the recipients had to be from the Grand Duchy or to have had a close connection to the Grand Duke or his realm, and had to have "distinguished themselves outstandingly in the war". Within the military, it was available to officers, non-commissioned officers and enlisted personnel. The 1st class medal could only be awarded after the 2nd class had been received, and it was always worn together with the latter.

== Description ==
The medal consisted of a cross pattée struck from black iron. Between the arms, which featured a raised border, was a laurel wreath. The lower graded 2nd class cross was suspended by a ribbon from a wire loop and suspension ring on the top. The higher graded 1st class cross was slightly larger and was worn on the left side of the chest without a ribbon, and was attached via a hinged pin on the reverse.

=== Obverse ===
A central circular medallion, featuring a raised border, displayed the monarch's monogram FA. The image of a crown was inscribed on the upper arm of the cross and 1914 on the lower arm.

=== Reverse ===
Same as the obverse, but with no inscriptions.

=== Size ===
The central medallion had a diameter of 19 mm for the 2nd class and 22 mm for the 1st class.

=== Ribbon ===
For military recipients, the ribbon was 35 mm wide, a dark cornflower blue with two poppy-red side stripes, each 5.5 mm wide. For civilian recipients, the ribbon was also 35 mm wide but with the colors reversed, poppy-red with two dark cornflower blue side stripes, each 5 mm wide and spaced 1.5 mm from the edges.

=== Front line medal bar ===
For merit at the front, a black iron medal bar was added to the 2nd class award by a decree dated 20 September 1918. This medal bar measured 6 mm in height and 34 mm in width, and bore the inscription VOR DEM FEINDE (Before the Enemy) on a stippled background. It was attached to the 2nd class ribbon.

== Selected recipients ==
=== First class ===
- Prince Adalbert of Prussia
- Conrad Albrecht
- Karl Allmenröder
- Joachim von Amsberg
- Kurt Aßmann
- Gustav Bachmann
- Hermann Bauer
- Paul Behncke
- Theobald von Bethmann Hollweg
- Johannes Blaskowitz
- Werner von Blomberg
- Friedrich Boedicker
- Hermann Boehm
- Walter Böning
- Karl Boy-Ed
- Walter Braemer
- Otto von Brandenstein
- Karl-Heinrich Brenner
- Eduard von Capelle
- Carl Clewing
- Hermann Densch
- Joachim Albrecht Eggeling
- Prince Eitel Friedrich of Prussia
- Otto von Emmich
- Archduke Eugen of Austria
- Alexander von Falkenhausen
- Gustav Fehn
- Hans Feige
- Otto Feige
- Wolfgang Fischer
- Kurt Fricke
- Archduke Friedrich, Duke of Teschen
- Werner von Fritsch
- Hermann Geyer
- Leo Geyr von Schweppenburg
- Walter Gladisch
- Siegfried Handloser
- Karl von Hänisch
- Hermann von Hanneken
- Heino von Heimburg
- Wilhelm Heye
- Paul von Hindenburg
- Franz von Hipper
- Rudolf Holste
- Henning von Holtzendorff
- Leo von Jena
- Gerhard Kauffmann
- Wilhelm Keitel
- Werner Kempf
- Gustav Kieseritzky
- Philipp Kleffel
- Hans Krebs
- Friedrich Kühn
- Gustav Leffers
- Magnus von Levetzow
- Walter Lohmann
- Felix von Luckner
- Günther Lütjens
- Friedrich Lützow
- Hugo Meurer
- Andreas Michelsen
- Georg Alexander von Müller
- Karl August Nerger
- Theo Osterkamp
- Erich Raeder
- Ludwig von Reuter
- Gotthard Sachsenberg
- Ehrhard Schmidt
- Hubert Schmundt
- Otto Schniewind
- Ludwig von Schröder
- Otto Schultze
- Hans von Seeckt
- Otto Stapf
- Otto von Stülpnagel
- Karl Topp
- Horst Julius Freiherr Treusch von Buttlar-Brandenfels
- Adolf von Trotha
- Hans Voigt
- Walter Warzecha
- Ernst von Weizsäcker
- Georg Wetzell
- Wilhelm II, German Emperor
- Karl Witzell
- Eberhard Wolfram

=== Second class ===
- Franz Beyer
- Ludwig Bieringer
- Max von Boehn
- Fritz-Otto Busch
- Hellmuth Heye
- Josef Jacobs
- Ernst Lindemann

== Sources ==
- Friedhelm Beyreiß: Der Hausorden und die tragbaren Ehrenzeichen des Großherzogtum Oldenburg 1813-1918. (1997) Norderstedt: Militair-Verlag Klaus D. Patzwall. ISBN 3-931533-31-X
- Hessenthal, Waldemar von; Schreiber, Georg (2001). Honours and Awards of the German States. Naval & Military Press. ISBN 978-1-843-42144-3.
