= Friedrich Boedicker =

German admiral (1866 – 1944)

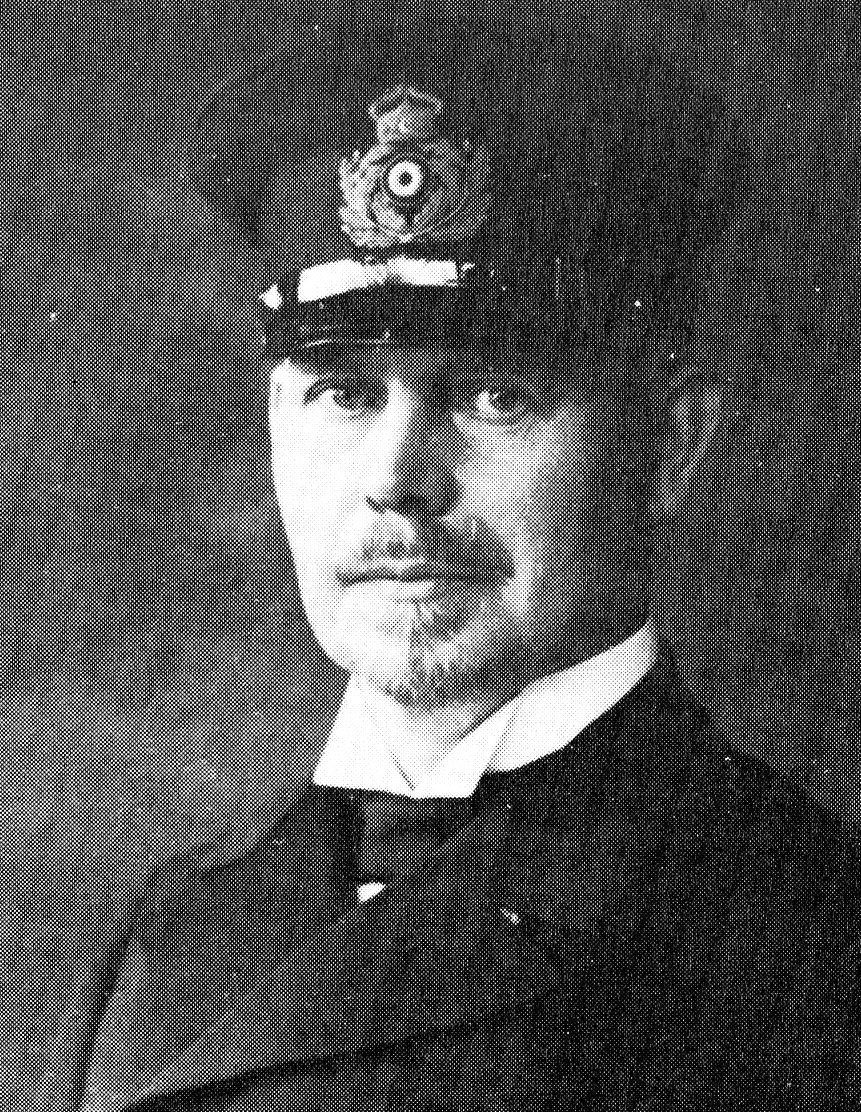
- Born: 13 March 1866; Kassel
- Died: 20 September 1944 (aged 78)
- Allegiance: German Empire
- Branch: Imperial German Navy
- Rank: Vizeadmiral (Vice Admiral)
- Commands: SMS Frauenlob; SMS Stettin; SMS Kaiser Barbarossa; SMS Schleswig-Holstein
- Conflicts: World War I; Bombardment of Yarmouth and Lowestoft; Battle of Jutland

Friedrich Boedicker (13 March 1866, Kassel – 20 September 1944) was a Vizeadmiral (Vice Admiral) of the Kaiserliche Marine during the First World War.

== Biography ==
Boedicker is perhaps best known for being present at the Battle of Jutland, where ships of his Second Scouting Group fired some of the first shots of the action.

He also commanded the battlecruisers of the I Scouting Group during the bombardment of Yarmouth and Lowestoft a month before the battle of Jutland, due to admiral Franz von Hipper being on sick leave. The ships that were part of the group were the SMS Seydlitz, SMS Lützow, SMS Derfflinger, SMS Moltke and the SMS Von der Tann. Boedicker was then a Konteradmiral (Counter admiral).

== Decorations and awards ==
- Iron Cross of 1914, 1st and 2nd class
- Order of the Red Eagle, 2nd class with oak leaves and swords
- Order of the Crown, 2nd class (Prussia)
- Service Award (Prussia)
- Honorary Knight's Cross, First Class of the House and Merit Order of Peter Frederick Louis (Oldenburg)
- Friedrich August Cross, 1st class (Oldenburg)
- Commander, First Class of the Albert Order with swords (Saxony)

== Footnotes ==
Military offices
Preceded by Kapitän zur See de:Franz von Holleben	Commanding officer, SMS Schleswig-Holstein; 15 September 1910 – 30 September 1913	Succeeded by Kapitän zur See de:Hans Uthemann
