= Siegfried Handloser =

Nazi physician and war criminal (1885–1954)

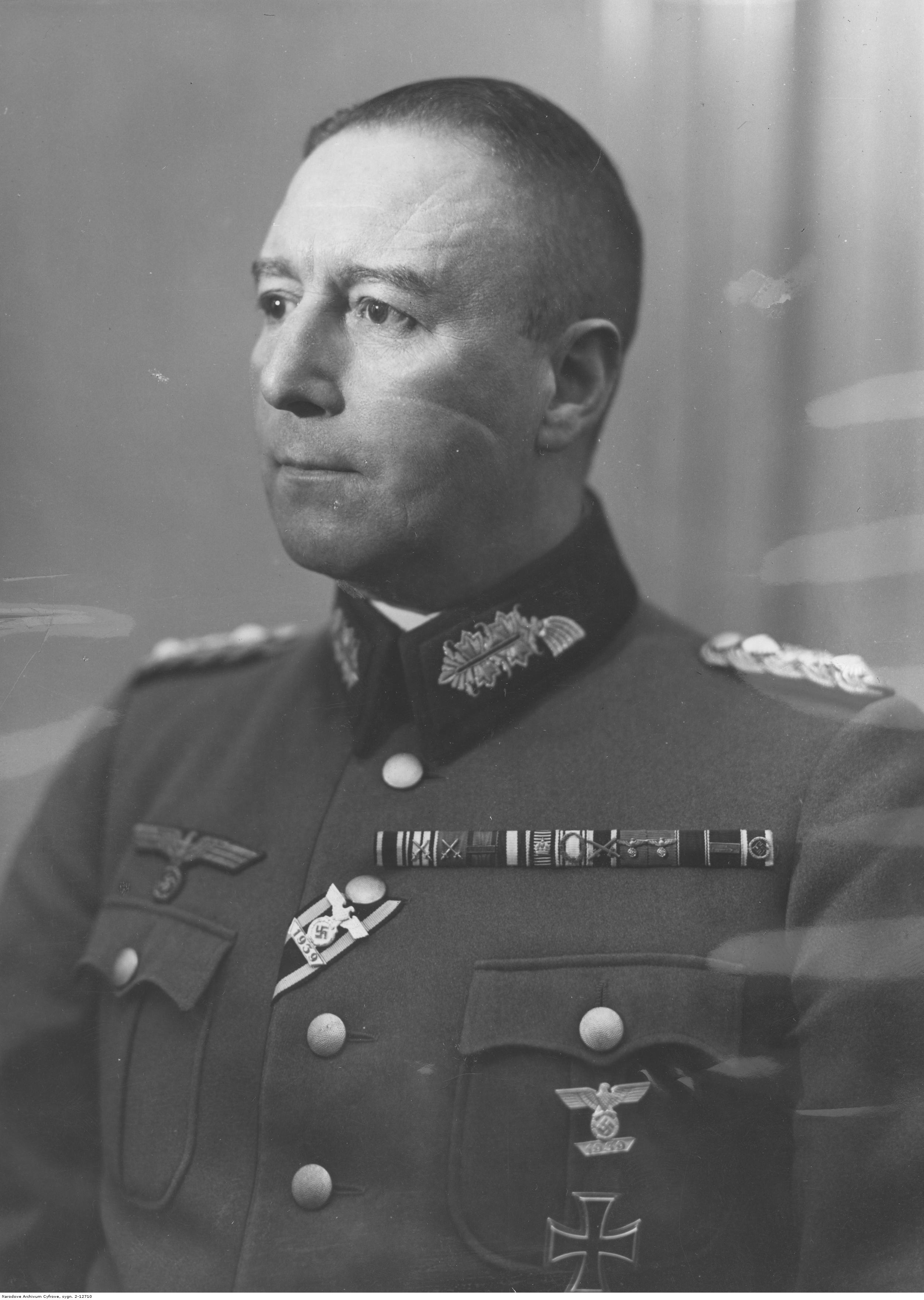
- Handloser, c. 1942

Chief of the Wehrmacht Medical Services
- In office 28 July 1942 – 8 May 1945
- Preceded by: Position created
- Succeeded by: Position abolished

Chief of the German Army Medical Inspectorate
- In office 1 January 1941 – 13 August 1944
- Preceded by: Anton Waldmann
- Succeeded by: Paul Walter

Personal details
- Born: Siegfried Adolf Handloser; 25 March 1885 Konstanz, Grand Duchy of Baden, German Empire
- Died: 3 July 1954 (aged 69) Munich, West Germany
- Cause of death: Cancer
- Parent(s): Konstantin Handloser (father); Anna Maria (mother)
- Education: Doctor of Medicine
- Alma mater: Kaiser Wilhelm Medicinal Academy; University of Giessen

Military service
- Allegiance: German Empire; Weimar Republic; Nazi Germany
- Branch/service: Imperial German Army; Reichswehr; German Army
- Years of service: 1911–1945
- Rank: Generaloberstabsarzt
- Battles/wars: World War I World War II
- Awards: Knight's Cross of the War Merit Cross with swords Clasp to the Iron Cross 2nd and 1st class

Siegfried Adolf Handloser (25 March 1885 – 3 July 1954) was a German physician, career military officer and war criminal. As the chief of all medical services in the Wehrmacht, he was brought to trial for overseeing medical atrocities at concentration camps during World War II. He was convicted at the 1947 Doctors' Trial during the subsequent Nuremberg trials and sentenced to life imprisonment. His sentence was reduced to a 20-year term, though he was released in 1954 and died of cancer the same year.

== Early career ==
Handloser was born in 1885 at Konstanz in the Grand Duchy of Baden. In 1903, he began studying medicine at the Kaiser Wilhelm Academy for Military Medical Education in Berlin and became a member of the student corps Pépinière-Corps Franconia. After passing the state medical examination in 1910, he received his doctorate in medicine in 1911. He became a member of the Imperial German Army Medical Service as a Fähnrich (officer cadet) in the 14th (Baden) Foot Artillery Regiment. He participated in World War I as a Oberarzt and was promoted to Stabsarzt in September 1916.

== Interwar years ==
At the end of the war, Handloser remained in the post-war Reichswehr, the armed forces of the Weimar Republic. He rose steadily through the ranks, becoming the chief physician in Wehrkreis (military district) V in Stuttgart in 1932. He was promoted to Generalarzt in January 1935, and served as the chief medical officer of Army Group Command 3 from 1935 to March 1938. Handloser joined the committee of the German Society for Internal Medicine (DGIM) in 1937 as a de facto Nazi emissary. Promoted to Generalstabsarzt in April 1938, he was chief medical officer to Army Group Command 5 until August 1939.

== World War II ==
Handloser was appointed as the chief medical officer to the 12th Army from October 1939 to November 1940. In January 1941, he was promoted to Generaloberstabsarzt (four stars, NATO rank OF-9). He then served as the chief of the Army Medical Inspectorate from January 1941 to August 1944. From 28 July 1942, he was also appointed Chief of the Armed Forces Medical Services in the Oberkommando der Wehrmacht (OKW; Armed Forces High Command), a post he retained until Germany's capitulation in May 1945. In this post, held the most important medical position with jurisdiction over all the Nazi armed forces, including the Waffen-SS. Handloser also held important academic teaching posts, as an honorary professor of medicine at the University of Vienna in October 1939 and at the Humboldt University of Berlin in 1943.

=== War crimes ===
Handloser attended a meeting on 29 December 1941, at which it was decided to conduct human experiments to test typhus vaccines at Buchenwald concentration camp. They resulted in the deaths of about 100 people.

Handloser actively operated the organization of forced prostitution in the territories occupied by the German Reich, in his position as chief of Wehrmacht Medical Services. Handloser strove to minimize the danger of venereal disease and to prevent "sexual intercourse with Jewish women".

== Post-war trial, conviction and death ==
Handloser was tried before the American Military Tribunal No. 1 (the Doctors' Trial), convicted in August 1947 and sentenced to life imprisonment. He was incarcerated at Landsberg prison. In January 1951, his sentence was reduced to 20 years. He was released on health grounds in 1954 shortly before dying of cancer in Munich at the age of 69.

== Awards and decorations ==
- Iron Cross (1914) 2nd and 1st class
- Honor Cross 3rd class of the Princely House Order of the House Order of Hohenzollern with swords
- Knight's Cross 2nd class of the Order of the Zähringer Lion with swords
- Hanseatic Cross of Hamburg
- Friedrich-August-Kreuz 1st class
- Knight's Cross of the Franz Joseph Order with war decoration
- Honor Badge for Services to the Red Cross 2nd class
- Honour Cross of the World War 1914/1918
- Clasp to the Iron Cross 2nd and 1st class
- Knight's Cross of the War Merit Cross with swords
