= Ludwig von Schröder (Luftwaffe) =

German Luftwaffe general (1884–1941)

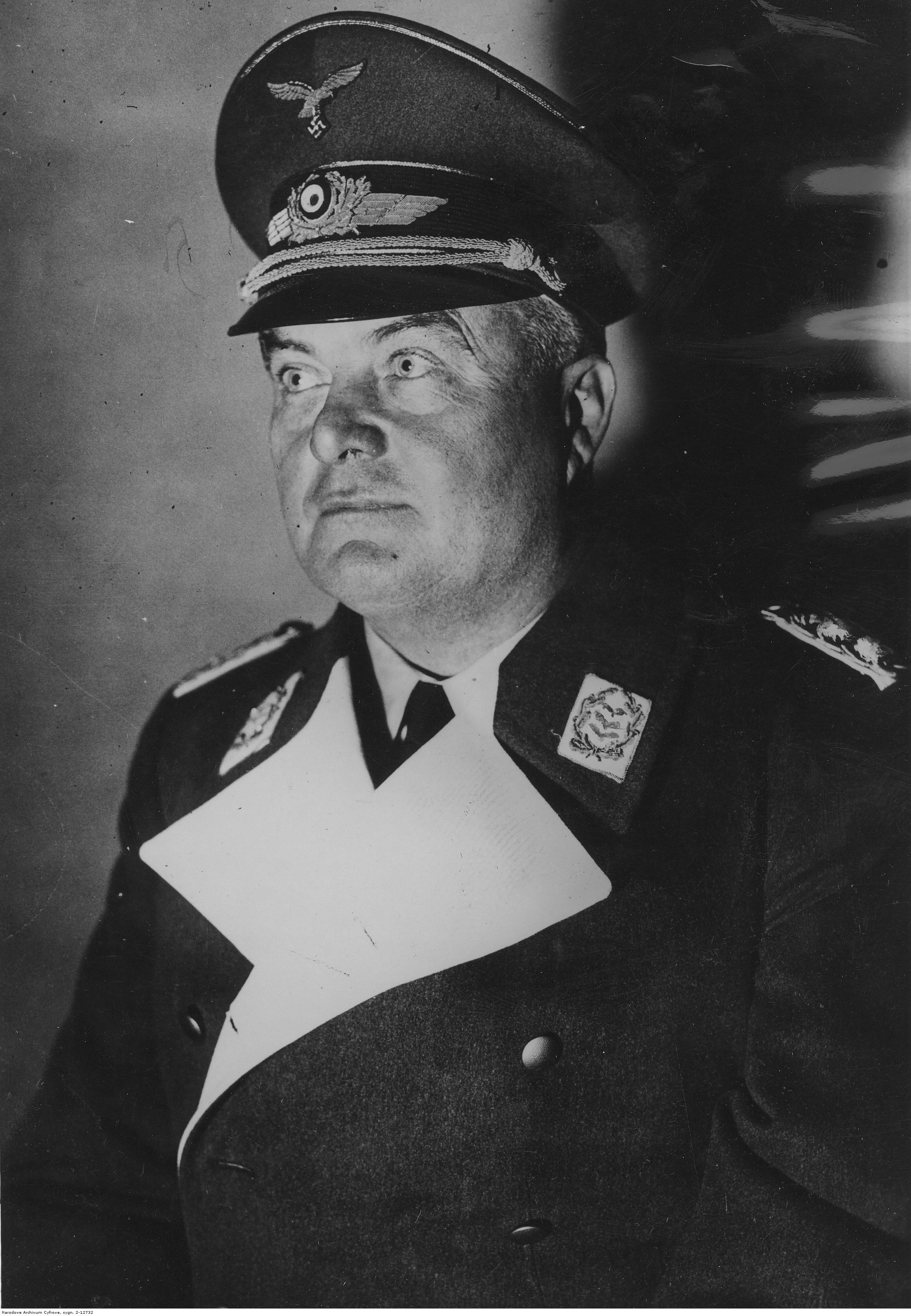
- Schröder in 1941
- Born: 12 September 1884; Kiel, German Empire
- Died: 28 July 1941 (aged 56) Lychen, Nazi Germany
- Allegiance: German Empire (1903-1918); Weimar Republic (1918-1933); Nazi Germany (1933-1941)
- Branch: Imperial German Navy; Reichsmarine; Luftwaffe
- Rank: Vizeadmiral; General der Flakartillerie
- Commands: Military Commander, occupied-Serbia
- Awards: Order of the Prussian Crown 4th class Knight's Cross of the House Order of Hohenzollern; Iron Cross, 1st and 2nd class

Ludwig Karl Hermann von Schröder (12 September 1884 – 28 July 1941) was a German career military officer who served in the navies of the German Empire and the Weimar Republic as well as in the air force of Nazi Germany. As a General in the Luftwaffe, he served as the second military commander in the Territory of the Military Commander in Serbia during World War II, where he issued orders carrying out discriminatory and repressive measures, including forced labor of ethnic minorities. He died during the war as a result of an aircraft accident.

== Naval career ==
Schröder was born in Kiel in 1884. He joined the Imperial German Navy in 1903 and participated in World War I. By the end of the war, he was a Kapitänleutnant and a battalion commander in Marine Artillery Regiment 2 in Flanders. He remained in the post-war Reichsmarine, and was promoted to Konteradmiral in October 1934. He was Second Admiral at the Baltic Sea Naval Station in 1934, and was the Commandant of the Pomeranian Coast from April 1935 to September 1937, when he left the naval service with the brevet promotion to Vizeadmiral.

== Luftwaffe service ==
In December 1937, Schröder joined the Luftwaffe with the rank of Generalleutnant and was promoted to General der Flakartillerie on 1 April 1939. He served as the vice-president (December 1937 to May 1939) and the president (May 1939 to May 1941) of the Reichsluftschutzbund (Reich Air Defense League). At the end of May 1941, he succeeded General Helmuth Förster as the commander of military forces in occupied Serbia.

Schröder was also a member of the Schutzstaffel (SS) from 1 October 1937 (SS number 288,517), entering as an SS-Brigadeführer and being promoted to SS-Gruppenführer on 20 April 1941. On 31 May 1941, Schröder ordered the registration of all Jews and Romani people in Serbia, who had to register with the authorities and wear a yellow armband as a means of identification. This order also contained a ban on their engaging in professions, and exclusion from public service and private companies. This was followed by a command of the military administration to undertake forced labor. The Nazi measure to register Jewish assets was also carried out to facilitate the later Aryanization of Jewish property. With these orders, anti-Jewish persecution measures were standardized in all of occupied Serbia. Forces under Schröder's command also carried out reprisal killings for attacks on German troops. Schröder died on 28 July 1941 in the Hohenlychen Sanatorium, where he had been transferred on 23 July after an airplane accident in Belgrade.

== Awards and decorations ==
- Order of the Prussian Crown, 4th class
- Knight's Cross of the House Order of Hohenzollern with swords
- Iron Cross, 1st and 2nd class
- Friedrich-August-Kreuz, 1st and 2nd class
- Hanseatic Cross of Bremen
- Hanseatic Cross of Hamburg
- Gallipoli Star
- Honour Cross of the World War 1914/1918
- War Merit Cross 1st and 2nd class with swords
- Wound Badge (1939) in gold
