= Eberhard Wolfram =

- Born: 24 July 1882; Gerbstedt, German Empire
- Died: 6 January 1947 (aged 64); Hamburg, Allied-occupied Germany
- Military career
- Allegiance: Nazi Germany
- Branch: Kriegsmarine
- Rank: Vizeadmiral
- Conflicts: World War I World War II
- Awards: Knight's Cross of the Iron Cross

Eberhard Wolfram (24 July 1882 – 6 January 1947) was a Vizeadmiral with the Kriegsmarine of Nazi Germany. He was a recipient of the Knight's Cross of the Iron Cross.

== Awards ==
- Iron Cross (1914) 2nd Class (21 September 1914) & 1st Class (18 September 1915)
- Knight's Cross of the House Order of Hohenzollern with Swords (14 February 1919)
- Hanseatic Cross of Hamburg (1 August 1916)
- Service award (Prussia) (5 March 1922)
- Friedrich August Cross 1st Class (5 March 1922)
- Clasp to the Iron Cross (1939) 2nd Class (8 December 1939) & 1st Class (30 May 1940)
- Knight's Cross of the Iron Cross on 25 May 1941 as Konteradmiral and Befehshaber der Sicherung der Nordsee (Commander-in-Chief of the security North Sea)

== Bibliography ==
- Dörr, Manfred (1996) (in German). Die Ritterkreuzträger der Überwasserstreitkräfte der Kriegsmarine—Band 2: L–Z. Osnabrück, Germany: Biblio Verlag. ISBN 3-7648-2497-2.
- Fellgiebel, Walther-Peer (2000) [1986]. Die Träger des Ritterkreuzes des Eisernen Kreuzes 1939–1945 — Die Inhaber der höchsten Auszeichnung des Zweiten Weltkrieges aller Wehrmachtteile [The Bearers of the Knight's Cross of the Iron Cross 1939–1945 — The Owners of the Highest Award of the Second World War of all Wehrmacht Branches] (in German). Friedberg, Germany: Podzun-Pallas. ISBN 978-3-7909-0284-6.
