= Gerhard Kauffmann =

German general (1887–1969)

- Born: 29 June 1887; Mariendorf
- Died: 16 June 1969 (aged 81); Berlin
- Military career
- Allegiance: German Empire (to 1918); Weimar Republic (to 1933); Nazi Germany
- Branch: Imperial German Army; Reichswehr; Army (Wehrmacht)
- Service years: 1908–1943
- Rank: Generalleutnant
- Commands: 256th Infantry Division
- Conflicts: World War I World War II
- Awards: Knight's Cross of the Iron Cross

Gerhard Kauffmann (29 June 1887 – 16 June 1969) was a German general during World War II. He was also a recipient of the Knight's Cross of the Iron Cross of Nazi Germany.

Kauffmann was born in Mariendorf in 1887. He entered the Royal Prussian Army in 1908. He served in World War I and, at the end of the war, he was an Hauptmann and the adjutant of the 39th Infantry Brigade. He remained in the post-war Reichswehr as a career officer. He was an infantry regimental commander between 1935 and 1937, then a staff officer in OKH until 1940. During World War II, he commanded the 256th Infantry Division until January 1942 when he was placed into the Führerreserve. Kauffmann was retired from active service in September 1943.

== Awards and decorations ==
- Iron Cross (1914)
  - 2nd class
  - 1st class
- Hanseatic Cross of Hamburg
- Friedrich-August-Kreuz, first class
- Military Merit Cross of Austria-Hungary, 3rd class with war decoration
- Honour Cross of the World War 1914/1918
- Clasp to the Iron Cross (1939)
  - 2nd class
  - 1st class
- Knight's Cross of the Iron Cross on 9 July 1941 as Generalleutnant and commander of 256th Infantry Division

Military offices
| Preceded by Generalleutnant Josef Folttmann | Commander of 256th Infantry Division; 10 January 1940 – 4 January 1942 | Succeeded by Generalleutnant Friedrich Weber |
