= SMS Hamburg =

Bremen-class light cruiser of the Imperial German Navy

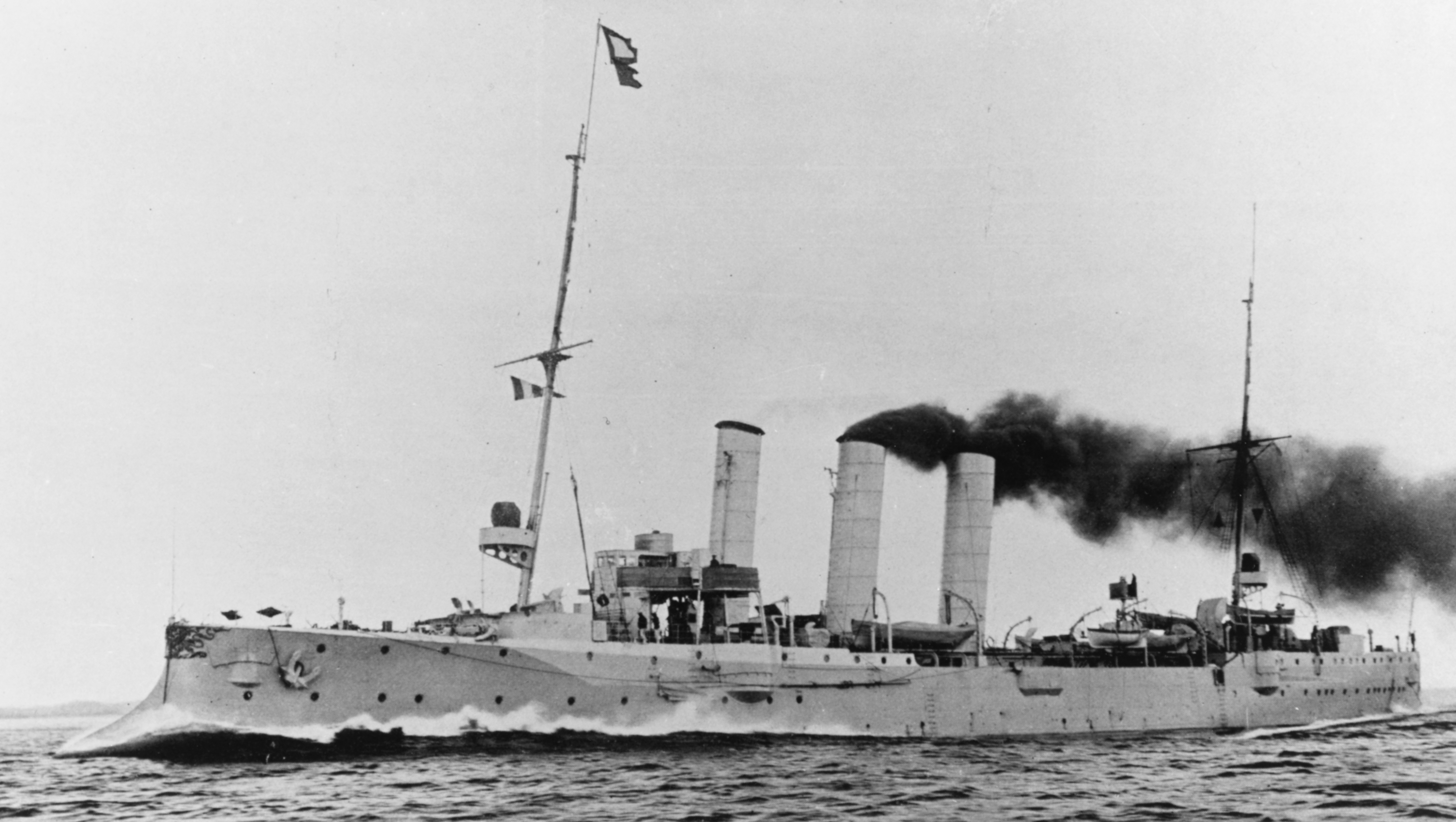
- Hamburg underway early in her career

History

German Empire
- Name: Hamburg
- Laid down: 1902
- Launched: 25 July 1903
- Commissioned: 8 March 1904
- Decommissioned: 30 June 1927
- Stricken: 31 March 1931
- Fate: Sunk in 27 July 1944, Raised and Scrapped in 1956

General characteristics
- Class & type: Bremen-class cruiser
- Displacement: Normal: 3,278 t (3,226 long tons); Full load: 3,797 t (3,737 long tons)
- Length: Length overall: 111.1 meters (365 ft)
- Beam: 13.3 m (43.6 ft)
- Draft: 5.28 m (17.3 ft)
- Installed power: 10 × water-tube boilers; 10,000 PS (9,900 ihp)
- Propulsion: 2 × screw propellers; 2 × triple-expansion steam engines
- Speed: 22 knots (41 km/h; 25 mph)
- Range: 4,270 nmi (7,910 km; 4,910 mi) at 12 kn (22 km/h; 14 mph)
- Complement: 14 officers; 274–287 enlisted men
- Armament: 10 × 10.5 cm (4.1 in) SK L/40 guns; 10 × 3.7 cm (1.5 in) Maxim guns; 2 × 45 cm (17.7 in) torpedo tubes
- Armor: Deck: 80 mm (3.1 in); Conning tower: 100 mm (3.9 in); Gun shields: 50 mm (2 in)

SMS Hamburg ("His Majesty's Ship Hamburg") (Note: "SMS" stands for "Seiner Majestät Schiff" (German: His Majesty's Ship).) was the second member of the seven-vessel Bremen class of light cruisers, built for the German Kaiserliche Marine (Imperial Navy) in the early 1900s. She and her sister ships were ordered under the 1898 Naval Law that required new cruisers be built to replace obsolete vessels in the fleet. The design for the Bremen class was derived from the preceding Gazelle class, utilizing a larger hull that allowed for additional boilers that increased speed. Named for the city of Hamburg, the ship was armed with a main battery of ten 10.5 cm (4.1 in) guns and had a top speed of 22 knots (41 km/h; 25 mph).

Hamburg served with the reconnaissance force of the main fleet for the majority of her early career, and during this period, she frequently escorted Hohenzollern, the yacht of Kaiser Wilhelm II. During World War I, she served as the deputy flagship of a flotilla of U-boats, and she frequently cruised with the High Seas Fleet during patrols in the North Sea. She was present at the Battle of Jutland on 31 May – 1 June 1916, where she was damaged in clashes with British light forces as the German fleet withdrew in the night. Obsolescent by that time, Hamburg was reduced to a stationary headquarters ship and was also used as an accommodation ship for the rest of the war.

Following Germany's defeat, Hamburg remained in Germany and was among the vessels permitted to the Reichsmarine by the Treaty of Versailles. She was among the first vessels to be recommissioned in 1920 and in 1921, while escorting minesweepers, she engaged Soviet coastal artillery. Her crew assisted in the suppression of unrest in Hamburg in October 1923. Reduced to a training ship in 1926, she embarked on a world cruise, after which she was decommissioned and reduced to a barracks ship. She served in that capacity in Kiel until early 1944, when the Nazi-era Kriegsmarine moved her to Hamburg to be broken up; British bombers sank the ship in April before she could be dismantled. The wreck was raised after the war in 1949 and was finally scrapped by 1956.

== Design ==
The German 1898 Naval Law called for the replacement of the fleet's older cruising vessels—steam corvettes, unprotected cruisers, and avisos—with modern light cruisers. The first tranche of vessels to fulfill this requirement, the Gazelle class, were designed to serve both as fleet scouts and as station ships in Germany's colonial empire. They provided the basis for subsequent designs, beginning with the Bremen class that was designed in 1901–1903. The principle improvements consisted of a larger hull that allowed for an additional pair of boilers and a higher top speed.

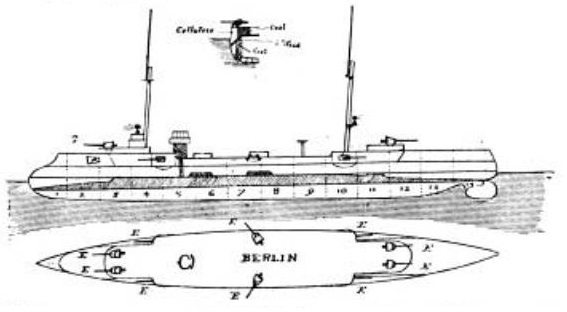
Plan and profile of the Bremen class

Hamburg was 111.1 meters (365 ft) long overall and had a beam of 13.3 m (44 ft) and a draft of 5.28 m (17.3 ft) forward. She displaced 3,278 metric tons (3,226 long tons) as designed and up to 3,651 t (3,593 long tons) at full load. The ship had a minimal superstructure, which consisted of a small conning tower and bridge structure. Her hull had a raised forecastle and quarterdeck, along with a pronounced ram bow. She was fitted with two pole masts. She had a crew of 14 officers and 274–287 enlisted men.

Her propulsion system consisted of two triple-expansion steam engines driving a pair of screw propellers. Steam was provided by ten coal-fired Marine-type water-tube boilers, which were vented through three funnels located amidships. Her propulsion system was rated at 10,000 metric horsepower (9,900 ihp) for a top speed of 22 knots (41 km/h; 25 mph). Hamburg carried up to 860 t (850 long tons) of coal, which gave her a range of 4,270 nautical miles (7,910 km; 4,910 mi) at 12 knots (22 km/h; 14 mph).

The ship was armed with a main battery of ten 10.5 cm (4.1 in) SK L/40 guns in single mounts. Two were placed side by side forward on the forecastle; six were located on the broadside, three on either side; and two were placed side by side aft. The guns could engage targets out to 12,200 m (13,300 yd). They were supplied with 1,500 rounds of ammunition, for 150 shells per gun. For defense against torpedo boats, she carried ten 3.7 cm (1.5 in) Maxim guns in individual mounts. She was also equipped with two 45 cm (17.7 in) torpedo tubes with five torpedoes. They were submerged in the hull on the broadside.

The ship was protected by a curved armored deck that was up to 80 mm (3.1 in) thick; it sloped down at the sides to provide a measure of protection against enemy fire. The conning tower had 100 mm (3.9 in) thick sides, and the guns were protected by 50 mm (2 in) thick gun shields.

== Service history ==
=== Construction – 1907 ===
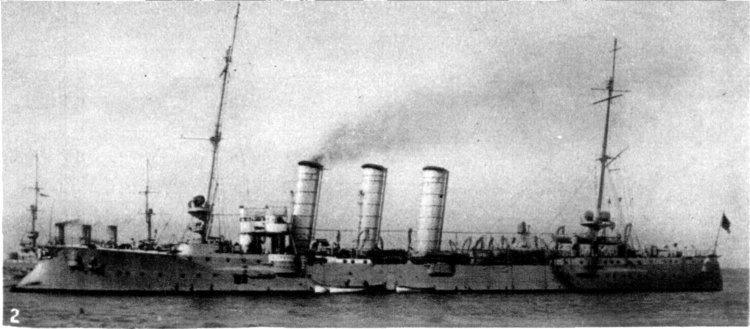
An unidentified member of the Bremen class

Hamburg, ordered under the contract name "K", (Note: German warships were ordered under provisional names. Additions to the fleet were given a single letter; ships intended to replace older or lost vessels were ordered as "Ersatz (name of the ship to be replaced)".) was laid down at the AG Vulcan shipyard in Stettin in August 1902. She was launched of 25 July 1903; at the ceremonies, the First Mayor of Hamburg, Johann Heinrich Burchard christened the ship after the city. A shipyard crew then transferred the unfinished vessel to Kiel for fitting-out. Hamburg was the first member of her class to enter service, being commissioned on 8 March 1904. The naval command intended to send Hamburg as an escort for Hohenzollern, the yacht for Kaiser Wilhelm II, but delays during her sea trials prevented her from joining Hohenzollern until June. She thereafter operated with the yacht for the following three months, beginning with a voyage from Kiel to Hamburg, where Wilhelm II embarked upon Hohenzollern for a sailing regatta. The ships then began a cruise to Norway from 7 July to 9 August; upon the Kaiser's return to Germany, he observed the fleet maneuvers in late August and early September aboard Hohenzollern, with Hamburg accompanying him.

Beginning on 28 September, Hamburg joined the Reconnaissance Unit for the main fleet, taking the place of the light cruiser Niobe. She operated with the fleet that autumn and embarked on a winter training cruise in the Baltic Sea at the end of the year. The ship took part in the peacetime routine of unit and fleet exercises in 1905, interrupted by another voyage in company with Wilhelm II aboard Hohenzollern to Helgoland in March and another to Pillau and Glücksburg in October. She also took part in a cruise with her steam turbine-equipped sister ship Lübeck to compare the two vessels' propulsion systems. The years 1906 and 1907 passed uneventfully for Hamburg, her time occupied with training exercises with the fleet. During this period, Fregattenkapitän (FK—Frigate Captain) Oskar von Platen-Hallermund served as the ship's commander from September 1906 to the end of September 1907, when he was replaced by Korvettenkapitän (KK—Corvette Captain) Ernst Ritter von Mann und Edler von Tiechler.

=== 1908–1914 ===
Hamburg underway before World War I (Note: The source of this image states that the photo was taken off San Francisco, though Hamburg never visited the United States, unlike her sister ship Bremen, which served for nearly ten years in North and South American waters.)

In February 1908, Hamburg embarked on a major training cruise into the Atlantic with the other ships of the Reconnaissance Unit. The vessels steamed as far as Spain, where they visited Vigo. The ship once again escorted Hohenzollern from 6 March to 19 May. During this period, the two ships—along with the dispatch boat Sleipner—cruised to the Mediterranean Sea. They stopped in Venice, Italy, and the Greek island of Corfu before departing on 5 May to return to Germany. She then returned to fleet duties, which included a major training exercise in the North Sea and a cruise by the entire High Seas Fleet. Hamburg was scheduled to be decommissioned during the winter of 1908–1909, as soon as the new cruiser Dresden was ready to take her place. But the turbine-powered cruiser proved to have trouble completing her initial testing, which forced Hamburg to remain in service for another year. Another cruise to Spain took place in February 1909, during which time Hamburg again stopped in Vigo from 17 to 23 February.

Upon returning to German waters, she was again designated the Kaiser's escort for another Mediterranean cruise. Hamburg, Hohenzollern, and Sleipner left Kiel on 24 March and arrived in Venice on 4 April. From there, they moved to Corfu on 16 April, where the Kaiser and his family planned to take their vacation. While there, reports of the persecution of Armenian Christians in the Ottoman Empire prompted widespread reaction throughout Europe; several countries dispatched warships to the southern Anatolian peninsula to protect the Armenians and Europeans in the area. Hamburg was detached as part of the operation and sailed on 21 April to Mersina, arriving there four days later. She was joined by the British battleship HMS Swiftsure and the French armored cruiser Victor Hugo, and later by Lübeck. The ships sent landing parties ashore to protect civilians, distribute food, and establish field hospitals. The situation had calmed by the mid-May, and on the 17th, Hamburg was detached to return home. She made the voyage, stopping in Port Said, Egypt and Málaga, Spain on the way, and ultimately arriving in Kiel on 28 May.

After returning to Germany, Hamburg was assigned to the Reconnaissance Unit. Shortly thereafter, Hamburg was detailed to escort Hohenzollern once again, though this time would be in company with the new armored cruiser Gneisenau. The ships left Kiel on 13 June and sailed to Neufahrwasser, where Wilhelm II came aboard Hohenzollern. From there, they proceeded into the northern Baltic to Finnish waters, where they met Wilhelm's cousin, Tsar Nicholas of Russia aboard his own yacht. Hamburg returned to Kiel at the conclusion of the trip on 20 June. She continued to operate in company with Hohenzollern for the next month, including during a sailing regatta in early July, the inauguration of the joint German and Swedish passenger ferry service between Sassnitz and Trelleborg. Another summer cruise to Norway followed from 18 July to 3 August, and upon their return to German waters, Hamburg was detached to resume fleet service. She took part in the annual fleet maneuvers in late August and early September for the first time in her career. She was then decommissioned in Wilhelmshaven on 15 September, as by that time, Dresden was finally ready for service.

Hamburg spent the years 1910 and 1911 in reserve, during which time she was overhauled but not modernized. She was recommissioned on 2 July 1912 to serve as the second command flagship for I U-boat Flotilla, part of the Torpedo-craft Inspectorate. She arrived at the unit on 6 August and thereafter took part in training exercises in the North Sea, followed by the fleet maneuvers later in August and September. She served in this capacity for the next two years, and during this period, KK Hermann Bauer served as the ship's commander from November 1913 to March 1914. At that time, on 15 March, she was transferred to the newly created U-boat Inspectorate.

=== World War I ===
Following the outbreak of World War I in July 1914, I U-boat Flotilla was stationed at Helgoland. On 6 August, she and the cruiser Stettin escorted a flotilla of U-boats into the North Sea in an attempt to draw out the British fleet, which could then be attacked by the U-boats. The force returned to port on 11 August, without having encountered any British warships. Another such operation took place the next day, also without resulting in contact with enemy vessels. On 21 August, the naval command dissolved both I and II U-boat Flotilla and reorganized the vessels of both units under Bauer's command, who was then given the title Führer der Unterseeboote (Leader of Submarines). Hamburg remained the flagship of the unit.

Hamburg also operated with the High Seas Fleet during this period, generally in company with the light cruisers of IV Scouting Group. The first such operation was the bombardment of Scarborough, Hartlepool and Whitby conducted over the course of 15–16 December. IV Scouting Group was tasked with screening the main element of the fleet while the battlecruisers of I Scouting Group shelled the towns; the intention was to lure out a portion of the British fleet that could be defeated in detail. At 06:59 on 16 December, Hamburg, the armored cruiser Roon, and the light cruiser Stuttgart encountered British destroyers under Commander Loftus William Jones. Jones shadowed the Germans until 07:40, at which point Hamburg and Stuttgart were detached to sink their pursuers. Reports of the destroyers prompted Admiral Friedrich von Ingenohl, the German fleet commander, or order the fleet to withdraw. At 08:02, Roon signaled the two light cruisers and ordered them to abandon the pursuit and retreat along with the rest of the High Seas Fleet.

Maps showing the maneuvers of the British (blue) and German (red) fleets on 31 May – 1 June 1916

The ship continued to operate with the fleet through 1915, in addition to her U-boat flagship duties. While cruising off the mouth of the Weser river on 21 April, she accidentally collided with the torpedo boat S21, breaking her in half and sinking her. Hamburg had to be drydocked for repairs, though these were completed in time for the ship to participate in a fleet sortie on 17–18 May. Another operation followed on 29–30 May; the ship saw little activity until the fleet conducted another sweep into the North Sea on 11–12 September, by which time the II. Führer der Torpedoboote (2nd Commander of Torpedo Boats), Kommodore (Commodore) Karl von Restorff had hoisted his flag aboard Hamburg. A final operation for 1915 took place on 23–24 October. None of the year's operations had resulted in contact with elements of the British Royal Navy. The fleet continued these operations in 1916, with sorties on 5–7 and 25–26 March and 21–22 and 24–25 April, the last of which resulted in the raid on Yarmouth and Lowestoft.

Hamburg was assigned to IV Scouting Group during the Battle of Jutland on 31 May – 1 June 1916. The IV Scouting Group, under the command of Commodore Ludwig von Reuter, departed Wilhelmshaven at 03:30 on 31 May, along with the rest of the fleet. Tasked with screening for the fleet, Hamburg and the torpedo boat V73 were positioned on the port side of the fleet, abreast of II Battle Squadron. Hamburg and IV Scouting Group were not heavily engaged during the early phases of the battle, but around 21:30, they encountered the British 3rd Light Cruiser Squadron (3rd LCS). Reuter's ships were leading the High Seas Fleet south, away from the deployed Grand Fleet. Due to the long range and poor visibility, only München and Stettin were able to engage the British cruisers. Hamburg only fired one salvo, since the haze rendered it impossible to spot the fall of shot. Reuter turned his ships hard to starboard, in order to draw the British closer to the capital ships of the German fleet, but the 3rd LCS refused to take the bait and disengaged.

After a series of night engagements between British cruisers and destroyers and the leading elements of the German fleet, including IV Scouting Group and the battleships of I Battle Squadron, the High Seas Fleet punched through the British light forces and reached Horns Reef by 04:00 on 1 June. In the course of the fighting, Hamburg and the other cruisers bore the brunt of subsequent attacks from British cruisers and destroyers, which scored several damaging hits on Hamburg. The German fleet reached Wilhelmshaven a few hours later; several of the battleships still in fighting condition took up defensive positions outside the port while he rest of the fleet entered Wilhelmshaven. In the course of the battle, Hamburg's crew suffered fourteen killed and twenty-five wounded. She was under repair until 26 July.

The German experience at Jutland had demonstrated that older vessels, particularly the pre-dreadnought battleships of II Battle Squadron and cruisers like Hamburg possessed inferior defensive characteristics and were no longer suited to offensive operations. Hamburg also had limited wireless equipment, which hampered her ability to coordinate U-boats while at sea. She participated in her last fleet sortie on 18–20 August, during which Restorff had moved to the dreadnought Prinzregent Luitpold to use its superior wireless sets. The operation resulted in the action of 19 August 1916, though she was not engaged in the minor battle. Hamburg thereafter served as a headquarters ship for use in port, later being converted into a barracks ship for U-boat crews in Wilhelmshaven. Crew shortages elsewhere in the fleet led her crew to be reduced on 15 March 1917, and from then, KK Friedrich Lützow, who was Restorff's chief of staff, also performed the duties of Hamburg's commander.

In the final weeks of the war, Germany was forced to abandon the U-boat campaign as a requirement for a cease-fire. Hamburg was not interned in Scapa Flow under the terms of the armistice that ended the fighting, and she remained in Wilhelmshaven during the peace negotiations that ultimately produced the Treaty of Versailles. The Führer der Torpedoboote and his staff came aboard the ship in February 1919. Following the signing of the treaty in June 1919, Hamburg was taken into the Reichsmarinewerft in Wilhelmshaven and was decommissioned there on 16 August.

=== Postwar career and fate ===
Hamburg remained out of service into 1920; instability in Germany during and after the Revolution of 1918–1919 culminated in the Kapp Putsch of March 1920, after which the new German navy, the Reichsmarine, began to recommission the old vessels that it was permitted to retain under the Versailles Treaty. Hamburg was among those vessels, and she was recommissioned on 7 September under the command of FK Bernhard Bobsien. She was assigned to the Marinestation der Nordsee (North Sea Naval Station), becoming the flagship of Konteradmiral (KAdm—Rear Admiral) Friedrich Richter, who fell ill in November and was temporarily replaced by Kapitän zur See (KzS—Captain at Sea) Walter Hildebrand. In addition to serving as the commander of the Marinestation, Richter, and then Hildebrand, was also the commander of II, IV, and VI Flotillas, which were tasked with clearing the minefields that had been laid in the North Sea during the war. KAdm Konrad Mommsen took command of the units on 2 April 1921, keeping Hamburg as the flagship. The cruiser visited the Shetland Islands from 13 to 17 June, the first time since the end of the war that a German vessel visited a foreign port.

In July 1921, Hamburg took part in fleet training exercises with the battleship Hannover and the light cruiser Medusa, along with I and II Flotillas. She escorted minesweepers from the 8th and 11th Minesweeper Half-Flotillas as they cleared a field that had been laid by the auxiliary cruiser Meteor during the war. While in Kola Bay, the German unit came under fire from a Soviet coastal battery; the Germans returned fire and withdrew. Once the mine-clearing work was completed, the ships returned to Germany, stopping in several Norwegian ports, including Vardø, Hammerfest, Tromsø, Ålesund, and Bergen. They arrived back in Wilhelmshaven on 31 August; Hamburg saw no further activity of note during the year. In February 1922, the ship was employed as an auxiliary icebreaker in the Baltic to assist merchant vessels in the area. Her hull was not strong enough for the task, and she had to be drydocked to repair damage sustained at the end of February. While the work was being done, the battleship Braunschweig returned to service, replacing Hamburg as the flagship of the Marinestation on 1 March. The rest of the year passed fairly uneventfully, with the only notable occurrences being a visit to Odda, Norway and the annual fleet maneuvers in August and September. After the maneuvers, FK Erich Heyden replaced Bobsien.

In July 1923, Hamburg visited Hanko, Finland, and Rønne on the Danish island of Bornholm. Continued unrest in Weimar Germany necessitated the deployment of Hamburg and two torpedo boats to the cruiser's namesake city in October. The two torpedo boats were detached to the Harburg district of the city and Hamburg sent a landing party ashore to help the city's police restore order. During this period, the fleet was reorganized, effective on 15 October; the position of Oberbefehlshaber der Seestreitkräfte (High Command of Naval Forces) was created as the superior command of the two Marinestation. Hamburg served as the flagship of KzS Adolf Pfeiffer, the commander of light naval forces in the North Sea. She spent the year 1924 conducting the normal peacetime routine of training exercises, interrupted by a visit to Riga from 8 to 14 July. After the August–September maneuvers, Heyden was relieved by now-KzS Lützow and Pfeiffer was replaced by KAdm Erich Raeder, though he remained in the position aboard Hamburg briefly, before Kommodore Franz Wieting replaced him in January 1925. At the same time, Hamburg was transferred to the Marinestation der Ostsee (Baltic Sea Naval Station), based in Kiel. Wieting remained the commander of light forces in the North Sea until 1 April, when that position was amalgamated with the deputy commander the battleship division; he thereafter transferred to Hannover in that role. In May, KzS Ernst Junkermann took command of the ship, though he served as the captain for just two months before being replaced by KzS Paul Wülfing von Ditten, who was in turn also relieved after two months by KK Hermann Densch.

The ship was transferred to the Training Inspectorate to be used as a training ship, under the command of FK Otto Groos. Preparations began for a major training cruise that would circumnavigate the Earth; Carl Wilhelm Petersen, the mayor of Hamburg, presented the city's flag to the cruiser during ceremonies on 14 February 1926. Petersen then embarked on the cruiser, which took him to Cuxhaven, further downstream on the Elbe. From there, Hamburg passed through the English Channel into the Atlantic; as she steamed south, she made port calls in Pontevedra, Spain, Funchal, Portugal, and Las Palmas in the Canary Islands. From the central Atlantic, she crossed to the West Indies and passed through the Panama Canal and visited the west coast of North and Central America, cruising as far north as San Francisco, United States. She then began her voyage across the Pacific Ocean, stopping in Honolulu in the Territory of Hawaii, on her way to Japan. Hamburg then steamed south to the Philippines, where she visited Manila and Iloilo City, and the Dutch East Indies, where she visited a number of ports. After crossing the Indian Ocean, she stopped in Colombo, British Ceylon, and entered the Red Sea, thereafter passing through the Suez Canal into the Mediterranean. After stopping in Vigo, the last foreign port the ship visited on the trip, she arrived back in Wilhelmshaven on 20 February 1927.

Hamburg was decommissioned on 30 June 1927 and she was reduced to reserve status the following year. She was stricken from the naval register on 31 March 1931, and five years later was converted by the Kriegsmarine into a barracks ship for submarine crews starting in 1936. During this period, she was based in Kiel, and she served in this capacity until 1944, when the Kriegsmarine decided to break her up for scrap. She was towed to her namesake city on 7 July 1944 for dismantling, where she was later sunk by British bombers on 27 July. The wreck was raised in 1949 and ultimately broken up between then and 1956.
