= Horst Julius Freiherr Treusch von Buttlar-Brandenfels =

WW2 German Luftwaffe colonel (1888-1962)

Horst Freiherr Treusch von Buttlar-Brandenfels
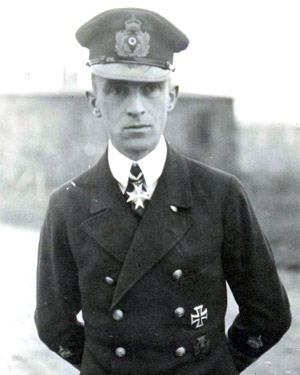
- Freiherr Treusch von Buttlar-Brandenfels with the Pour le Mérite
- Born: 14 June 1888; Hanau, Hesse-Nassau, Kingdom of Prussia, German Empire
- Died: 3 September 1962 (aged 74); Berchtesgaden, Bavaria, West Germany
- Spouse(s): 1916 Ilse "Ille" Agnes Anna Böhm; 3 daughters
- Military career
- Allegiance: German Empire; Nazi Germany
- Branch: Imperial German Navy; Reichsmarine; Luftwaffe
- Rank: Oberst (Colonel)
- Conflicts: World War I World War II
- Awards: Pour le Mérite
- Other work: Flight controller and businessman

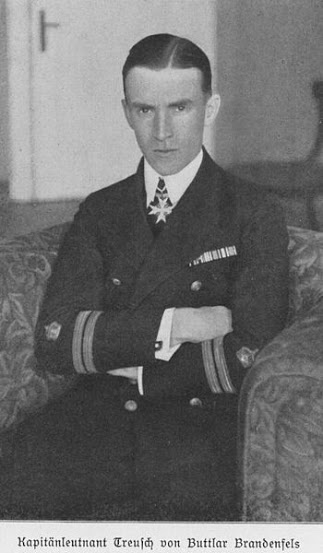
Kapitänleutnant Treusch von Buttlar Brandenfels (1918)

Horst Julius Ludwig Otto Freiherr Treusch von Buttlar-Brandenfels (14 June 1888 – 3 September 1962) was a German officer. Freiherr, which equals "Baron", was his title of nobility.

== Life ==
He was known for commanding several airships during World War I, including the most successful Zeppelin of the war, the Zeppelin L 30. Treusch von Buttlar-Brandenfels was awarded the Pour le Mérite on 9 April 1918 for his service as the commander of Zeppelin L-54. He was the commander of Frankfurt Airport at the end of World War II.

== Promotions ==
=== Navy ===
- 3 April 1907 Seekadett
- 21 April 1908 Fähnrich zur See
- 28 September 1910 Leutnant zur See
- 27 September 1913 Oberleutnant zur See
- 16 July 1917 Kapitänleutnant

=== Luftwaffe ===
- 1 October 1934 Major and territorial protection / state security officer (L-Offizier)
  - head of the Kiel branch of the Air Office
- 1 August 1937 Oberstleutnant (Lieutenant Colonel) and supplemental officer (E-Offizier)
- 27 August 1939 Charakter als Oberst (honorary / brevet Colonel)
- 1 February 1941 Oberst (active Colonel)

== Awards and decorations ==
- Iron Cross (1914), 2nd and 1st Class
  - 2nd Class on 9 January 1915
- House Order of Hohenzollern, Knights Cross with Swords (HOH3X) on 9 October 1916
- Princely House Order of Hohenzollern (Fürstlich Hohenzollern'sches Ehrenzeichen), Cross of Honour III. Class with Swords (HEK3/HE3) on 17 March 1917
- Military Merit Cross (Austria-Hungary), 3rd Class with War Decoration (ÖM3K)
- Hanseatic Cross of Hamburg (HH) on 14 February 1918
- Friedrich-August-Kreuz, 2nd and 1st Class (OFA1)
- Pour le Mérite on 9. April 1918
- Commemorative badge for the airship crews in 1920
- Honour Cross of the World War 1914/1918 with Swords

== Works ==
- Im Marineluftschiff gegen England! Eckart. Berlin 1917.
- Luftschiffangriffe auf England. E.S. Mittler & Sohn. Berlin 1918.
- Zeppeline gegen England. von Hase & Koehler. Leipzig 1931.

== See also ==
- Marinekabinett (in German) de:Marinekabinett
