= Adolf Raegener =

German General and Knight's Cross recipient

- Born: 17 February 1895
- Died: 17 August 1983 (aged 88)
- Military career
- Allegiance: German Empire; Weimar Republic; Nazi Germany
- Branch: Imperial German Army; Reichswehr; Army (Wehrmacht)
- Service years: 1914–1945
- Rank: Generalleutnant
- Conflicts: World War I World War II
- Awards: Knight's Cross of the Iron Cross with Oak Leaves

Adolf Raegener (17 February 1895 – 17 August 1983) was a general in the Wehrmacht of Nazi Germany during World War II. He was a recipient of the Knight's Cross of the Iron Cross with Oak Leaves.

Raegener was born at Kleinleinungen in 1895. He entered the Imperial German Army in 1914 at the start of World War I. At the end of the war, he was a Leutnant in Infantry Regiment 79. He remained as a career officer in the post-war Reichswehr, serving as a battalion commander from 1935 to 1940. During World War II, Raegener commanded infantry regiments 309 and 9 until 1941 when he was severely wounded. After recuperating, he next became the commander of a training group for officer candidates in Berlin, and the commander of Fahnenjunkerschule IX until early 1945. In the last months of the war, he led various Kampfgruppe.

== Awards and decorations ==
- Iron Cross (1914) 2nd Class & 1st Class (2 March 1917; 5 June 1916)
- Knight's Cross of the House Order of Hohenzollern with swords
- Hanseatic Cross of Hamburg
- Military Merit Cross (Mecklenburg-Schwerin)
- Baltic Cross, 1st and 2nd class
- Wound Badge (1918) in black
- Honour Cross of the World War 1914/1918
- Clasp to the Iron Cross (1939) 2nd Class (1 October 1939) & 1st Class (17 May 1940)
- Knight's Cross of the Iron Cross with Oak Leaves
  - Knight's Cross on 25 June 1940 as Oberstleutnant and commander of Infanterie-Regiment 309
  - 842nd Oak Leaves on 17 April 1945 as Generalleutnant and commander of Verteidigungsbereich Magdeburg
- War Merit Cross, 1st and 2nd class with swords
- Wound Badge (1939) in silver

== Sources ==
- Fellgiebel, Walther-Peer (2000) [1986]. Die Träger des Ritterkreuzes des Eisernen Kreuzes 1939–1945 — Die Inhaber der höchsten Auszeichnung des Zweiten Weltkrieges aller Wehrmachtteile [The Bearers of the Knight's Cross of the Iron Cross 1939–1945 — The Owners of the Highest Award of the Second World War of all Wehrmacht Branches] (in German). Friedberg, Germany: Podzun-Pallas. ISBN 978-3-7909-0284-6.
- Thomas, Franz (1998). Die Eichenlaubträger 1939–1945 Band 2: L–Z [The Oak Leaves Bearers 1939–1945 Volume 2: L–Z] (in German). Osnabrück, Germany: Biblio-Verlag. ISBN 978-3-7648-2300-9.
- Webb, James Jack (2025). Generals and Admirals of the Third Reich: For Country or Fuehrer. Vol. 3: P–Z. Havertown, PA: Casemate Publishers. ISBN 978-1-952-71518-1.
