= Hermann Densch =

German admiral (1887–1963)

Reichskommissar Supreme Prize Court
- In office July 1943 – April 1945
- Preceded by: Walter Gladisch
- Succeeded by: None

Personal details
- Born: 15 June 1887 Königsberg, East Prussia, German Empire
- Died: 28 August 1963 (aged 76) Garmisch-Partenkirchen, Bavaria, West Germany

Military service
- Allegiance: German Empire; Weimar Republic; Nazi Germany
- Branch/service: Imperial German Navy; Reichsmarine; Kriegsmarine
- Years of service: 1905–1945
- Rank: Admiral
- Commands: North Sea Naval Station
- Battles/wars: World War I World War II
- Awards: Clasp to the Iron Cross, 1st and 2nd class German Cross in silver

Hermann Densch (1887–1963) was a German career naval officer who rose to the rank of Admiral in the Kriegsmarine. During World War II, he served as the navy's commander of reconnaissance forces, the commander of the North Sea naval station and the head of the Supreme Prize Court.

== Naval career ==
Densch was born in 1887 at Königsberg and entered the Imperial German Navy in 1905. He served as an officer in World War I and, at the end of the war, he was a Kapitänleutnant and the chief of the 1st Torpedo Boat Half-flotilla at Flanders. He remained in the post-war Reichsmarine, and was promoted to Konteradmiral in January 1935, Vizeadmiral in January 1938 and Admiral in January 1940. He was posted as a staff officer and chief of staff at the Oberkommando der Marine (OKM), the naval high command, from September 1932 to September 1936. Densch was the commander of reconnaissance forces between October 1937 and October 1939. In World War II, he was the commander of the North Sea Naval Station until February 1943. In July 1943, he replaced Walter Gladisch as Reichskommissar of the Supreme Prize Court in Berlin, holding this post until April 1945, just before Germany's surrender.

== Awards and decorations ==
- Iron Cross, 1st and 2nd class
- Knight's Cross of the House Order of Hohenzollern with swords
- Hanseatic Cross of Hamburg
- Hanseatic Cross of Lübeck
- Friedrich-August-Kreuz 1st and 2nd class
- Honour Cross of the World War 1914/1918
- German Cross in silver
- Clasp to the Iron Cross 1st and 2nd class

== See also ==
- Peking Plan

== Sources ==
- Dermot Bradley (Hrsg.), Hans H. Hildebrand, Ernest Henriot: Deutschlands Admirale 1849–1945. Die militärischen Werdegänge der See-, Ingenieur-, Sanitäts-, Waffen- und Verwaltungsoffiziere im Admiralsrang. Band 1: A–G. Biblio Verlag. Osnabrück 1988. ISBN 3-7648-1499-3. S. 236–237.
- Webb, James Jack (2024). Generals and Admirals of the Third Reich: For Country or Fuehrer. Vol. 1: A–G. Havertown, PA: Casemate Publishers. ISBN 978-1-952-71512-9.
