= Walter Gladisch =

German admiral (1882–1954)

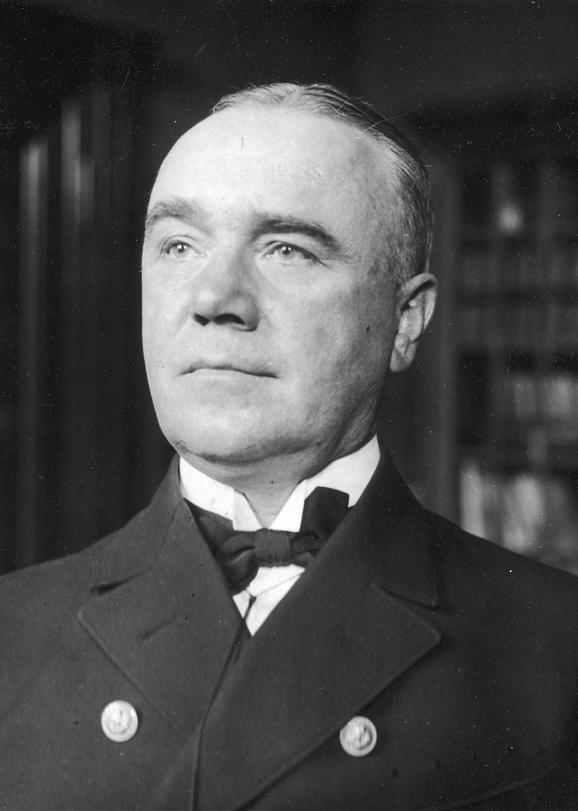
- Gladisch in 1930
- Born: 2 January 1882; Berlin, German Empire
- Died: 23 March 1954 (aged 72); Bad Homburg, Hesse, West Germany
- Military career
- Allegiance: German Empire; Weimar Republic; Nazi Germany
- Branch: Imperial German Navy; Reichsmarine; Kriegsmarine
- Service years: 1898–1943
- Rank: Admiral
- Commands: Fleet Chief, 1931–1933
- Conflicts: Boxer Rebellion; World War I; World War II
- Awards: Iron Cross, 1st and 2nd class; War Merit Cross

Signature
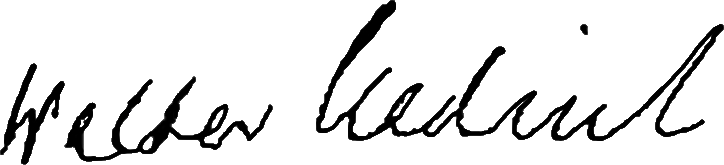

Walter Gladisch (2 January 1882 – 23 March 1954) was a German naval officer who rose to the rank of Admiral, and whose military service spanned more than 42 years in the navies of the German Empire, the Weimar Republic and Nazi Germany. He was a participant in the Boxer Rebellion and both world wars. He also authored a volume of the official history of the navy's actions in the North Sea during World War I.

== Career ==
Gladisch was born in Berlin in 1882 and entered the Imperial German Navy in 1898. He served with the East Asia Squadron at the time of the Boxer Rebellion. He continued his naval service throughout World War I, and at the war's end, he was a Korvettenkapitän and a second admiralty staff officer with the High Seas Fleet command.

Gladisch remained in the Reichsmarine throughout the Weimar Republic, serving in staff and command roles. He was promoted to Konteradmiral on 1 October 1928 and Vizeadmiral on 1 October 1931. Effective that date, Gladisch was appointed Flottenchef des Flottenkommandos (fleet chief of the fleet command). He held this post until his retirement in September 1933, at which time he was given a brevet promotion to Admiral.

In 1937, Gladisch authored the sixth volume – covering the period from June 1916 to spring 1917 – of the German Navy's multi-volume account of its wartime operations in the North Sea, Der Krieg in der Nordsee.

Gladisch was recalled to active service in March 1939. He was not given an active command, but on the outbreak of World War II in September, he was appointed Reichskommissar at the Supreme Prize Court in Berlin. He served in this capacity until 30 June 1943, at which point he permanently retired. He died at Bad Homburg on 23 March 1954.

== Awards and decorations ==
- Iron Cross (1914) 2nd and 1st class
- China Commemorative Medal
- Hanseatic Cross of Hamburg
- Friedrich-August-Kreuz 2nd and 1st class
- Military Merit Cross of Austria-Hungary, 3rd class with war decoration
- Iron Crescent
- Honour Cross of the World War 1914/1918
- War Merit Cross 2nd and 1st class

== Sources ==
- Reichwehrministerium (1929). "Rangliste der Deutschen Reichsmarine 1929". HathiTrust. E. S. Mittler & Sohn. p. 39.
- Webb, James Jack (2024). Generals and Admirals of the Third Reich: For Country or Fuehrer. Vol. 1: A–G. Havertown, PA: Casemate Publishers. ISBN 978-1-952-71512-9.
