= Service Award Cross =

Prussian military service award

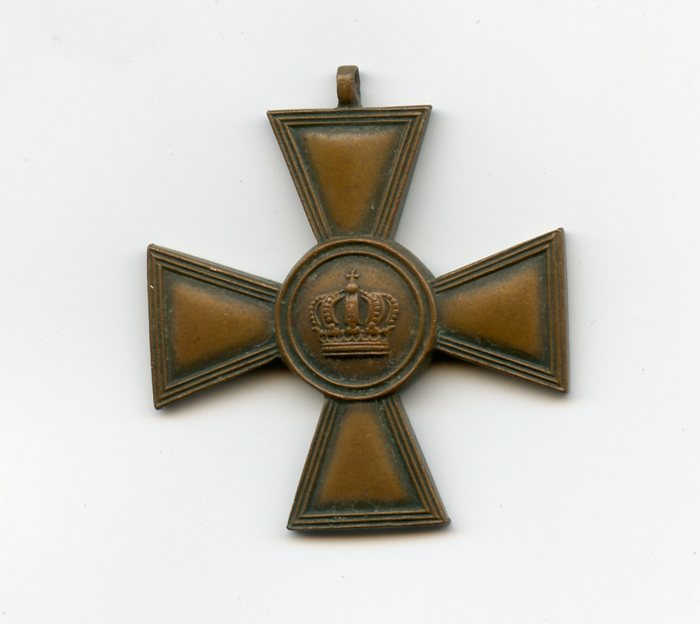
Prussian Service Award Cross awarded to Johann Paulus.

A Service Award Cross (German: Preußisches Dienstauszeichnungskreuz) was an award for long-time service as a civil servant or member of the military. Prussia had a service cross for 25 years of service for officers and military doctors as well as service awards in the form of buckles for nine-, 15 - and 25-years' service in the active army.

The Military Service Decoration in the Kingdom of Prussia was established in 1825 and could be awarded to non-commissioned officers and enlisted men in three classes for nine, 15, and 21 years of service. It consisted of an iron, silver, or gold buckle bearing the initials F. W. III (Frederick William III) on a blue ribbon, bordered in black, white, or yellow, respectively. The Long Service Cross for officers and physicians after 25 years of service, also established in 1825, was a gold cross on a blue ribbon in the center shield bearing the initials F. W. III. The reverse bore the Roman numeral XXV (25).

In addition, there was a Landwehr Service Award in two categories: a cross for 20-years service by officers and a buckle for 12-years' service by officers and men of the Landwehr if they took part in a campaign or had served at least three months on active service convened for an extraordinary initiative.

The Landwehr Service Decoration for service in the Landwehr was established in 1842 and was awarded to officers and enlisted men after fulfilling their duty, participating in a campaign, or serving actively for three months under exceptional circumstances. It consisted of a Prussian blue ribbon with two small gold embroidered Landwehr crosses on the right and left, with a gold embroidered monogram F.W.IV. (Frederick William IV) between them. The ribbon was pulled over a plate soldered to an iron frame. When a further class of the Landwehr Service Decoration was established for officers and doctors for 20 years of service on July 4, 1868, the original award, established in 1842, was designated II. Class and the new award I. Class. The First Class award consisted of a silver cross on a blue ribbon with the monogram WR (Wilhelm Rex) on the obverse and XX (20 years of service) on the reverse.

Similar rules and orders - mostly in Prussian-like orders - were produced in the kingdoms of Bavaria and Saxony. Even in the Weimar Republic, the Third Reich and other states there were distinctions for long periods of service. The German Federal Republic had service awards, not restored on German unification.

== See also ==
- Service award
