= Hanseatic Cross =

German WWI military award

Hanseatic Cross (Hanseatenkreuz)
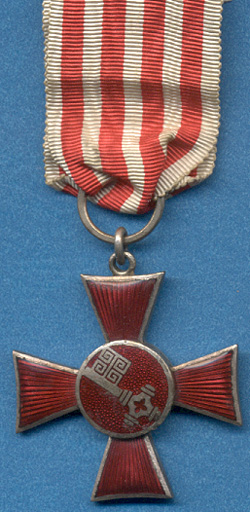
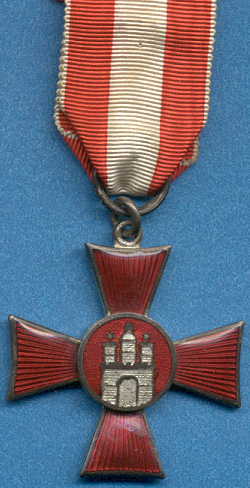
- Obverse of the Hanseatic Cross from Bremen (left) and Hamburg (right)
- Type: Single-grade
- Awarded for: War merit
- Description: Red-enameled cross pattée bearing the coat of arms of the awarding city-state on the center medallion
- Presented by: Bremen, Hamburg and Lübeck
- Eligibility: Military and civilians who aided the war effort
- Campaign: World War I
- Status: Obsolete
- Established: August/September 1915
- First award: 1915
- Final award: 1918

Highlights
- Total: c. 80,000
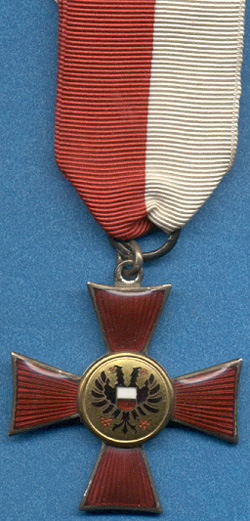
- Obverse of the Hanseatic Cross from Lübeck (left) and reverse of all three versions, here Bremen (right)

Precedence
- Next (higher): None
- Next (lower): None

The Hanseatic Cross (German: Hanseatenkreuz) was a military decoration of the three Hanseatic city-states of Bremen, Hamburg and Lübeck, which were member states of the German Empire. It was established and awarded during World War I.

== Establishment ==
The Hanseatic Cross was jointly instituted by agreement of the senates of the three cities, with the senate of each republic ratifying the award on different days. The Lübeck version was established first, on 21 August 1915. The Hamburg version followed on 10 September and the Bremen version on 14 September. Each republic established its own individualized version of the cross, but the overall design and award criteria were similar for all three.

== Eligibility criteria ==
The cross was awarded for distinguished war service, without regard to rank or social status, and could be awarded to civilians as well as military personnel.

According to Section 2 of the founding documents, the award could be conferred upon:

- Current or former members of infantry regiments 75 (Bremen), 76 (Hamburg) and 162 (Lübeck)
- Members of other army or navy units that were stationed in the three free states at the outbreak of the war, subsequently transferred there or newly raised there
- Crews of the SMS Bremen, SMS Hamburg and SMS Lübeck
- Citizens of Hamburg, Bremen or Lübeck who participated in the war in other army or navy units
- Persons who served in the voluntary medical services of Bremen, Hamburg, or Lübeck in the war zones

When awarded for bravery or combat merit, the Hanseatic Cross was the three cities' equivalent of the Iron Cross of Prussia.

== Description ==
The Hanseatic Cross was awarded in only one class, and took the form of a cross worn from a ribbon on the left chest. The cross was a cross pattée made of silver-plated bronze with slightly curved arms, which were enamelled red on the front. The cross was 40 mm wide.

=== Obverse ===
The soldered-on central medallion (17 mm in diameter) bore the coat of arms of the awarding city-state.

- Bremen: On a red enameled background, the silver-plated Bremen coat of arms – a diagonally-positioned key.
- Hamburg: On a red enameled background, the Hamburg coat of arms – a silver castle with three towers.
- Lübeck: On a gold background, the Lübeck coat of arms – a black enameled double-headed eagle with a small breast shield of white and red.

=== Reverse ===
The reverse was identical for all three variants. In the center of the matte silver-plated cross arms, within a round (17 mm) medallion, the inscription "Für Verdienst" (For Merit) was arranged in an arc at the top, with "im Kriege 1914" (in war 1914) arranged in three lines beneath it.

=== Ribbon ===
Each cross was suspended from a ribbon, 30 mm wide. The ribbons differed on each variant.

- Bremen: five white and four vermilion vertical stripes, each 3.1 mm wide
- Hamburg: white vertical center stripe with two vermilion vertical side stripes, each 8 mm wide, and white edging 2 mm wide
- Lübeck: divided vertically, half white and half vermilion

== Recipients ==
There were approximately 50,000 awards of the Hanseatic Cross of Hamburg, the largest Hanseatic city. The Bremen Hanseatic Cross was awarded approximately 20,000 times. Lübeck was the smallest of the Hanseatic cities, and its Hanseatic Cross was awarded approximately 8,000–10,000 times. The roll for the Lübeck Hanseatic Cross have been transcribed by an international team of phaleristic researchers from Germany, Belgium and the Netherlands. The complete roll was expected to be available by fall 2008/spring 2009.

== Sources ==
- Hessenthal, Waldemar von; Schreiber, Georg (2001). Honours and Awards of the German States. Naval & Military Press. ISBN 978-1-843-42144-3.
- Dr. Kurt-Gerhard Klietmann, Pour le Mérite und Tapferkeitsmedaille (1966). Berlin: Verlag Die Ordenssammlung. p. 16.
- Donald G. Neville, Medals, Ribbons & Orders of Imperial Germany & Austria (1974). Balfour Publications. ISBN 0-85944-009-5, pp. 29, 46.
- Jörg Nimmergut, Deutsche Orden und Ehrenzeichen 1800-1945 (2008). Battenberg Verlag, ISBN 978-3-86646-037-9, p. 165.
