= Walter Lohmann =

German marine officer (1878–1930)

- Lohmann early in his career
- Born: 30 December 1878; Bremen
- Died: 29 April 1930 (aged 51); Rome
- Military career
- Allegiance: Germany
- Branch: Reichsmarine
- Service years: 1897-1927
- Rank: Captain
- Unit: Naval Transport Division
- Known for: Lohmann Affair

Walter Lohmann (born 30 December 1878 in Bremen; died 29 April 1930 in Rome) was a German Reichsmarine officer with the rank of captain. From 1920 to 1927 as commander of the Naval Transportation Division, Lohmann ran a secret rearmament and research program on behalf of the Ministry of the Reichswehr in an attempt to circumvent the Versailles restrictions. Lohmann's access to naval offices in Königsberg, Lübeck, Stettin, Hamburg, and Bremen gave him access to very specialized information and financial resources. He used this knowledge in his work in a way that was far beyond his authority and technical competence. Favoured by the interests of the Chief of Naval Headquarters, Admiral Paul Behncke, it led to uncontrolled scope for legal violations, criminal activity and high-handed action by individuals within the ministry. When his work was discovered in 1927, the scandal became known as the Lohmann affair in Germany and led to the resignation of Reichswehr Minister Otto Gessler in January 1928 and director of naval command Admiral Hans Zenker. Lohmann himself was retired and his pension was cut, but he was never prosecuted, because to uncover the affair's true background would have been too great a risk. Completely impoverished, Lohmann died three years later of a heart attack. After he was relieved of duty, the clandestine rearmament programme was continued and expanded.

== Life ==
Lohmann was the youngest son of Johann Georg Lohmann , who was a director of the German shipping company Norddeutscher Lloyd and Clarissa Lohmann, née Frost, an English woman. His older brother was Alfred Lohmann, who was president of the Bremen Chamber of Commerce.

== Career ==
After attending school, Lohmann joined the Imperial Navy as a naval cadet on 7 April 1897. After his officer training, he was deployed to the Far East: first in 1903 to the gunboat SMS Tiger, and then from 1910 as company commander in the German colony of Tsingtau. With the outbreak of World War I, he was appointed to the rank of Korvettenkapitän I artillery officer aboard the dreadnought Prinzregent Luitpold where he worked as a non-combat logistics specialist. In March 1918, he was transferred to the Imperial Naval Office (Reichsmarineamt), where he worked in the Navy Transport Division (See-transportabteilung in der Marineleitung) from December 1918.

Lohmann was a cadet on the SMS Tiger gunboat

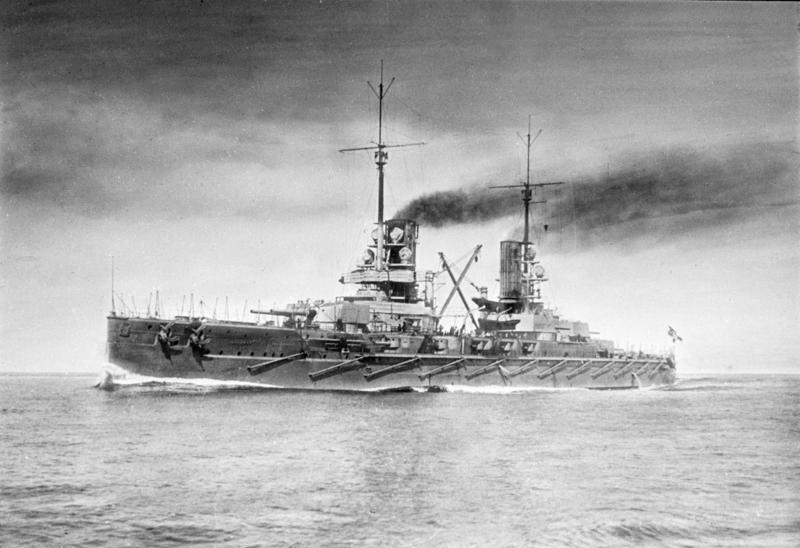
Lohmann was a logistics officer on the SMS Prinzregent Luitpold

As a representative of the Sea Transport Department in the General Naval Office, Lohmann took part in the maritime armistice negotiations in 1919 in England. While there he worked with the Permanent Naval Allied Armistice Commission (PANAC) organisation to enable German shipping to commence overseas lines, which were critical to the recovery of the German economy. Lohmann secured over 1000 travel authorisations to enable German ships to pass through the blockade of Germany. He was still in England when the Kapp Putsch occurred on 13 March 1920, so his career was not compromised. When he returned, he was appointed commander (Chef der Seetransportabteilung der Reichsmarine) of the Naval Transport Division (BS) on 28 October 1920.

He was also on very good terms with Chief of Naval Headquarters, Admiral Paul Behncke and this further consolidated his position, receiving significant promotion of himself and the field of work. At the time, Behncke required an overview of the merchant marine as he believed it still had a role even under the Treaty of Versailles. Behncke subordinated Lohmann to the Ministry for Reconstruction on 21 December 1920 with a request that he attend all meetings where commercial shipping was discussed. In May 1921, Lohmann managed to secure some shipping that had been seized by the British and used for prisoner of war transports that were returned to their former owners, which raised his reputation amongst his colleagues considerably and set a precedent for future purchases. In October 1921, he visited Leningrad to reach an agreement for the release of German shipping that were still considered seaworthy with Leon Trotsky and foreign minister Georgy Chicherin. A further visit followed in May 1922, with a delegation to complete negotiations with the Russian Admiralty. While there, he met the German ambassador Ulrich von Brockdorff-Rantzau and informed him that due to the influence of Hans von Seeckt, negotiations with Trotsky and all official bodies had turned sour. During his visits, he became acquainted with Else Ektimov, a Russian women of German descent and arranged for her to return to Germany.

== Collapse ==
By 1927, Lohmann's health had been damaged (Note: Described as "Severe psychosomatic disorders".) by his frantic efforts to complete the rearmament programme and even though he had several indiscretions that could have exposed him, it wasn't until August 1927 that his programme was finally exposed due to the investigative work of the Berliner Tageblatt economics journalist, Kurt Wenkel. Wenkel had wondered since mid-July 1927 how Phoebus-Film AG could delay its collapse for so long. During that same month his questions were answered when he received information indirectly about Lohmann's financials in Phoebus-Film AG and Berliner Bankverein from the former director of the company, Sally Isenberg, who was in dispute with the film company. Beginning on 8 August 1927, Wenkel began publishing a series of articles that lasted for two weeks, that had titles like "The film scandal in the Ministry of Defense" and "Captain and Merchant".

The government under Reichskanzler Wilhelm Marx tried to limit the damage. The Wenkel articles were removed from publication under threat of prosecution for treason. However, by 10 August, it was clear that denial wouldn't work and the government decided to take a more measured approach, confirming only the essentials. The economic activities were portrayed as the work of a subordinate official that resulted in the financial mismanagement at the Phoebus company. What was then known as the Phoebus scandal become known as the Lohmann Affair.

On 13 August 1927, the government instructed President of the Court of Audit Friedrich Saemisch to investigate the incident in the hope of avoiding a government committee investigation. Lohmann believed he would be cleared of all blame as he considered it his job to exceed authority and to keep his actions secret from Naval Command to ensure the success of the rearmament programme. Saemisch found such an attitude was anathema to the strictures of Naval Command who wanted to dismiss him. However, Saemisch realised that such an action would have exposed the government to further scandal as there was many other aspects to Lohmanns work that were still unknown to the public. Instead, he recommended that Lohmann be quietly retired, on a reduced pension.

Saemisch submitted both a written report and oral summary to the government on 8 November 1927. Although Marx was facing significant pressure from the opposition parties to publish the report, he was hesitant to publish in case it led to further exposure, even though it was free of military secrets. On 28 January, Marx asked for the resignation of Reichswehr Minister Otto Gessler before a crucial parliamentary debate, ensuring the opposition parties had little ammunition to attack the government. Even so, on 1 March 1928, the budget committee demanded that it be published. Instead, Marx published a new report "Report on the nature, extent and implementation of the so-called Lohmann undertakings" on the 10 March 1928 that focused explicitly on the financial aspects of the Phoebus-Film AG company. Marx shared the original report with the heads of the opposition parties to stress the national security implications of keeping it secret. On 31 March 1928, the Marx government acting on Saemisch's recommendations, retired Lohmann, drastically reduced his pension and made him liable for the sum of 120,000RM for damages associated with Phoebus. His expected promotion to Vizeadmiral was also permanently deferred.

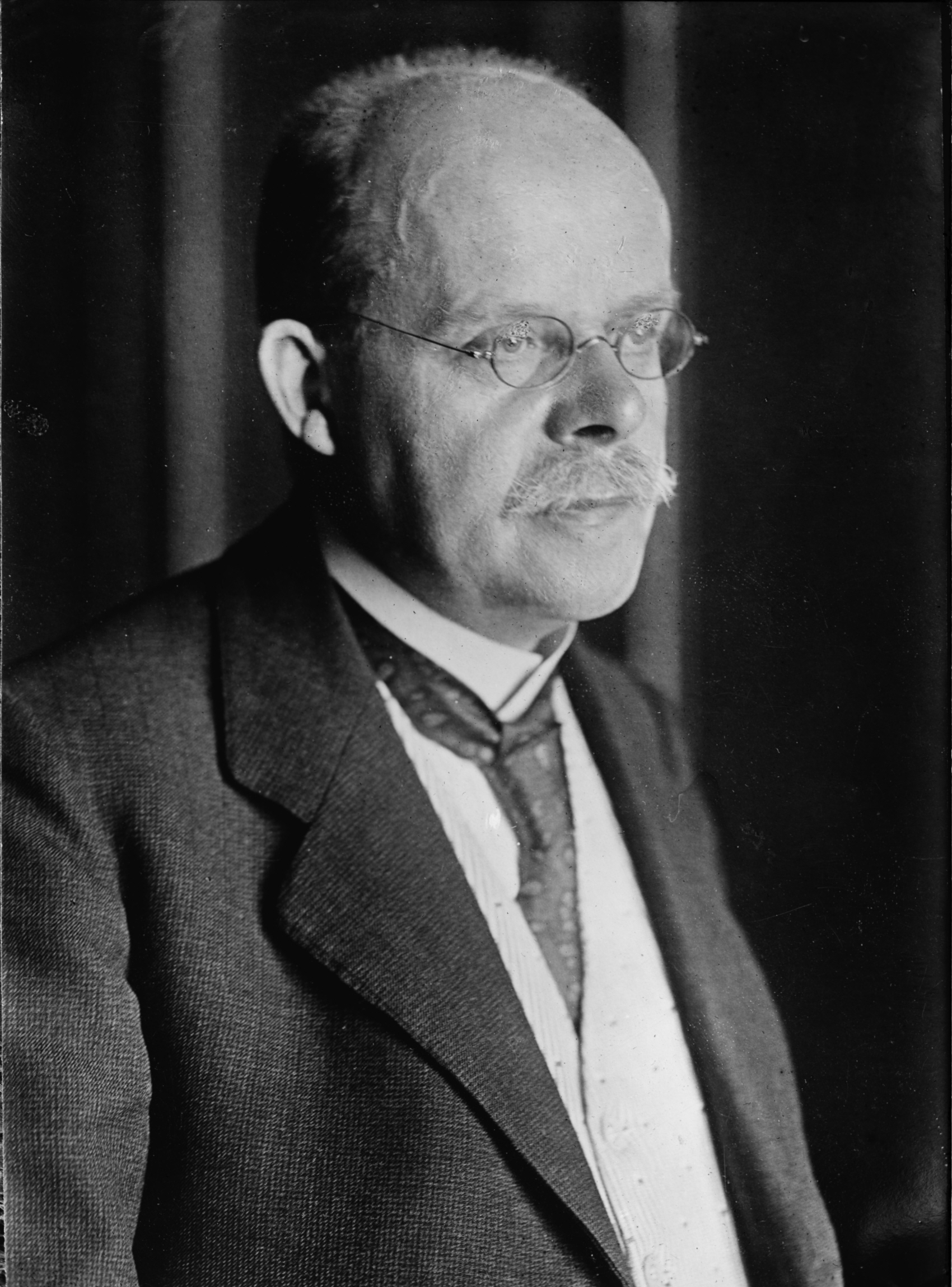
The Reich Chancellor Wilhelm Marx delayed the publication of the report into Lohmann's work to protect the government.

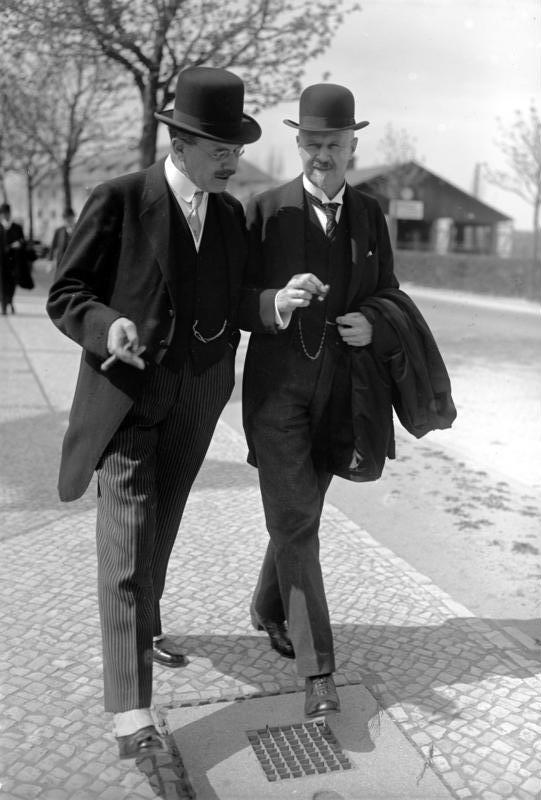
Saemisch's (on the right) prepared a report on Lohmanns work

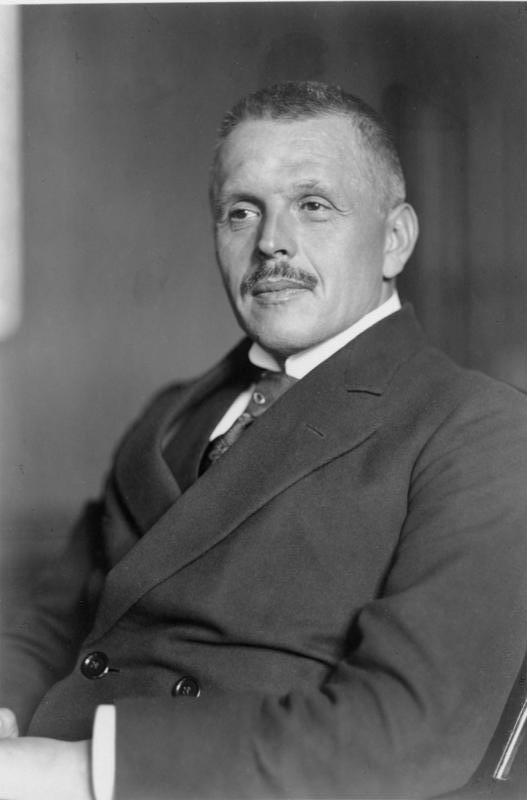
Reichswehr Minister Otto Gessler was forced to resign in January 1928

== Death ==
During a business trip to Italy, Lohmann died of a heart attack in Rome on 29 April 1930, at the age of 52.

== Rearmament programme ==
=== Lohmanns rearmament concept ===
At the time there were two prevailing views in German Naval Command. The official strategy developed and advanced by the Chief of the Fleet Department Wilfried von Loewenfeld and supported by Admiral Hans Zenker was to build Deutschland-class cruisers. These were unofficially known as "pocket battleships" by the British and officially called armoured ships in Naval Command, that were built in accordance with restrictions imposed by the Versailles treaty. These diesel driven ships were lightly armoured but heavily armed with six 11-inch guns and were to be fast with a range that exceeded any other cruiser or capital ship of the period. In this way, Loewenfeld and Zenker hoped to tie up the French Navy in support of their merchant fleet in the Atlantic, while keeping the sea lanes clear in the north of Scotland to ensure it wouldn't be subject to any further naval blockades. It also had the added benefit of what was known as "Bündnisfähigkeit" (alliance capability), i.e. should there be an alliance, the vessels would make a strong contribution to that alliance. By technically staying inside the terms of the treaty, they hoped to persuade the signatories of the treaty, Great Britain, USA, France, Italy and Japan to accept Germany into the group of countries with a navy and thus abolish the restrictions. Lohmann along with Rear Admiral Arno Spindler, Director of submarines advocated for a rapprochement with the Soviet Union as they believed it could provide prohibited war materials and at the same time, improve economic ties with Germany. However Lohmann's views were rejected by Naval Command. Although his views were not welcome, he had a remarkably free hand as the officer responsible for relations with Moscow.

==== Funding ====
The Occupation of the Ruhr beginning on 11 January 1923, failed to dent Lohmann's career. The Reichsbank provided 100 million gold deutsche marks to the Reichswehr for the possible escalation of hostilities, which never occurred. At the end of the occupation, the monies were never returned, instead what remained was shared amongst the services. By that point Behncke trusted Lohmann completely and in early 1923, assigned the Reichsmarine's share of what constituted black funds, amounting to 10 million Reichsmarks for Lohmann to administer. Other monies were collected by the Reichsmarine during that period by the sale of warships and submarines that were scrapped. This raised the black funds to 25million marks. A further deposit of 2.5million Reichmarks (RM) from Reichstag coffers along with 2.25million from other sources was provided for distribution by Lohmann, bringing the total to 29.75million marks.

When he received the funds, Lohmann began to gradually develop a plan under the title "Principle of Reconstruction", to both finance and secure prohibited war materials, believing he could count on receiving further funding totaling 40-50million marks in the future. A 1926 ministry memorandum "Denkschrift über die Notwendigkeit der Beschaffung eines langfristigen Kredites zur Sicherstellung gewisser militärisch notwendiger Marinebelainge, denen aus verschiedenen Gründen beim Ordentlichen Marinehaushalt nicht Rechnung getragen Werden kann" (Memorandum on the necessity of obtaining a long-term loan to secure certain militarily necessary naval assets which, for various reasons, cannot be taken into account in the regular naval budget) illustrated Lohmanns financial concept.

==== Financial concept ====
Lohmann planned to finance the operation by seeking private business loans which he would use to create businesses whose income would fund the expansion. The businesses would be structured in such in a manner to build trust abroad, populate the Naval supply chain correctly with armaments and at the same time, provide intelligence of the capabilities of foreign industry. The 1926 memorandum described how the plan was split into two categories; surface vessels that were required and subsurface vessels i.e. U-boats required. For each individual type of craft, code words and sentences were used in identifying the vessel types, to hide their existence, e.g. U-boats were classed as "auxiliary vehicles under the water". To move quickly to production of naval vessels, i.e. the event of war, prototyping would be used and the companies that supplied the construction materials would be financially secured. The ministry calculated that a budget of 50 million Reichmarks would be needed over a 10-year period, for the supply of 16 large vessels, 10 medium vessels and 100 smaller vessels.

To maintain the strictest secrecy in financing, when a particular project was started, only the defence minister and the finance minister were informed verbally of the details and nature of the loan. No paper trail was created. Then the department head would be informed and they would be responsible for signing the loan agreement and ensuring any legal details were correctly dealt with. Once the loan was secured, the repayment details were hidden in the naval budget, under a category of spend that couldn't easily be monitored or audited.

=== Capital projects ===
==== U-boats ====
Although Article 191 of the Versailles Treaty was formulated explicitly to forbid Germany access to submarine technology, by the time the treaty was abolished in September 1935, Naval Command had 12 manned u-boats in operation with a further 16 under construction.

In October 1921, while Lohmann visited Leningrad to buy back seized German shipping, he used the visit with Leon Trotsky and foreign minister Georgy Chicherin to discuss cooperation on submarine development. In May 1922, Lohmann made a second visit to the Soviet Union with a group of business representatives aboard a steamer, but no agreement on cooperation could be reached. These discussions were primarily led by Yevgeny Berens and although no concrete agreement was reached, the Soviet Union agreed to buy German Accumulatoren-Fabrik AFA submarine batteries in July 1922. Lohmann blamed Head of the Army Command Hans von Seeckt for damaging the discussions, stating to the new Ambassador Ulrich von Brockdorff-Rantzau in August that discussions has been proceeding well with Trotsky and Chicherin the year before, until von Seeckt intervened. On 29 December 1922, Lohmann forwarded a letter to von Brockdorff-Rantzau, to determine if a new meeting could be arranged to advance the discussions, but Brockdorff-Rantzau refused as he was only in the position a few weeks. In February 1923, Lohmann informed Brockdorff-Rantzau that several small Russian submarines that he saw in Saint Petersburg could be used as the basis for a repair contract in a joint operation. Lohmann wanted to send a naval architect to inspect the submarines and requested Paul Wülfing von Ditten discuss the contract during a diplomatic visit to the country in 1923 as part of a delegation led by General Otto Hasse. However, Trotsky was ill and the discussions never took place. The submarine inspections did take place though and the architect identified a problem. What would happen if there was war during the contract period? In a letter from Brockdorff-Rantzau to Lohmann following the inspections, he stated that conditions weren't right for the contract to be agreed. He believed that strong military ties were necessary between Russia and Germany and these weren't in place. Lohmann decided to persevere and arranged for 6 million gold marks to finance the project but no further discussions took place during that period.

In 1924, Lohmann arranged a contract for the construction of several large freighters for the Soviet Union.

Meaningful conversations between the two countries didn't recommence until March 1926, when a diplomatic delegation led by Paul Behncke visited Moscow. This led to a Soviet Naval envoy visit to Germany, who agreed that negotiations could commence. This was followed by another delegation visit led by Rear Admiral Arno Spindler and Admiral Walther Kinzel in June 1926. Unlike the previous negotiations, an agreement was reached almost immediately with the Soviets requesting German technical and professional support in the construction of submarines. However, the relationship failed to develop and the agreement was broken, when the Reichmarine received a diplomatic communiqué in December 1926 stating that Soviet submarines couldn't be built to German designs due to a lack of funding.

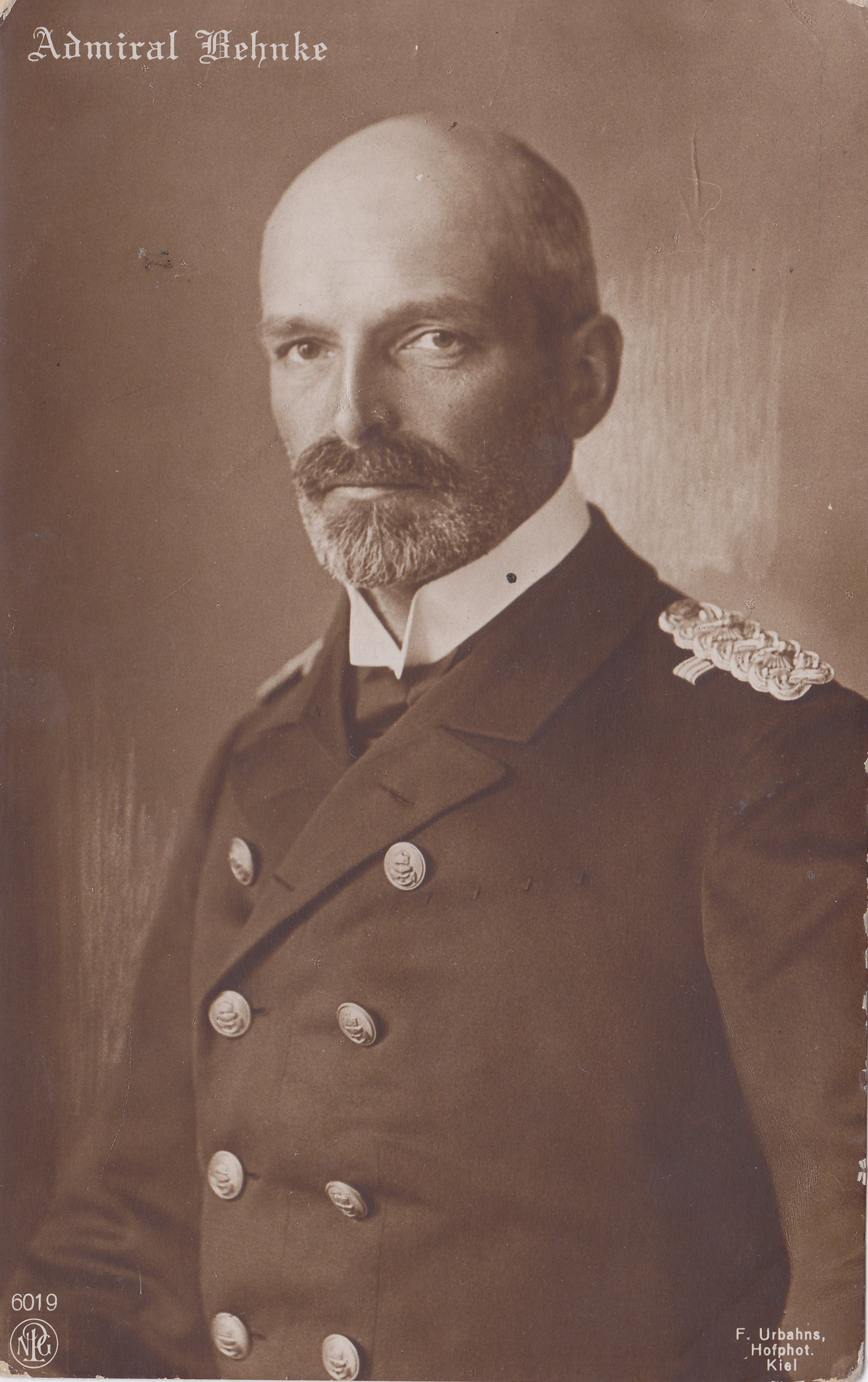
Admiral Paul Behncke interests converged with Lohmann, who had a significant influence on him

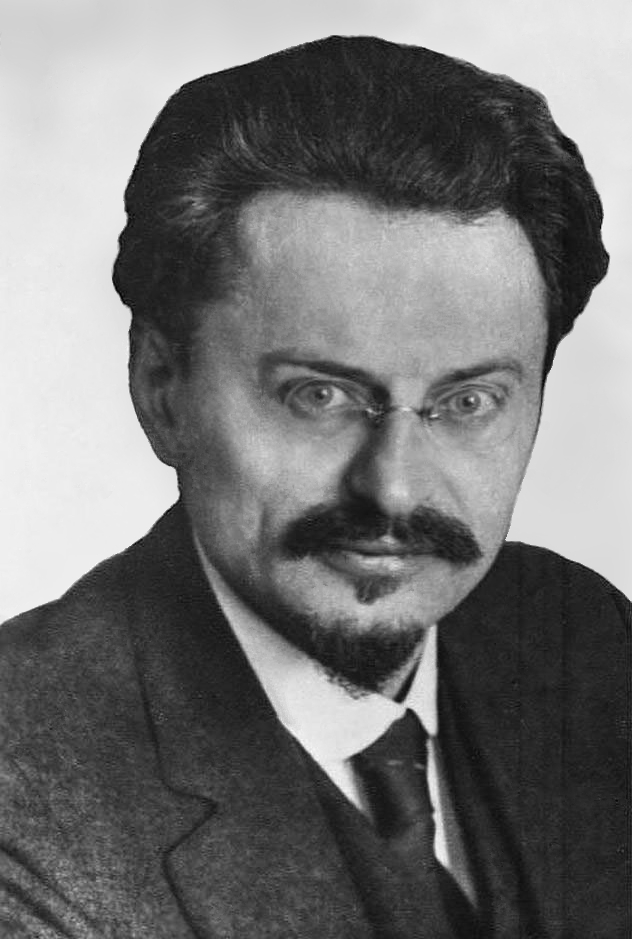
Lohmann reached an agreement with Trotsky

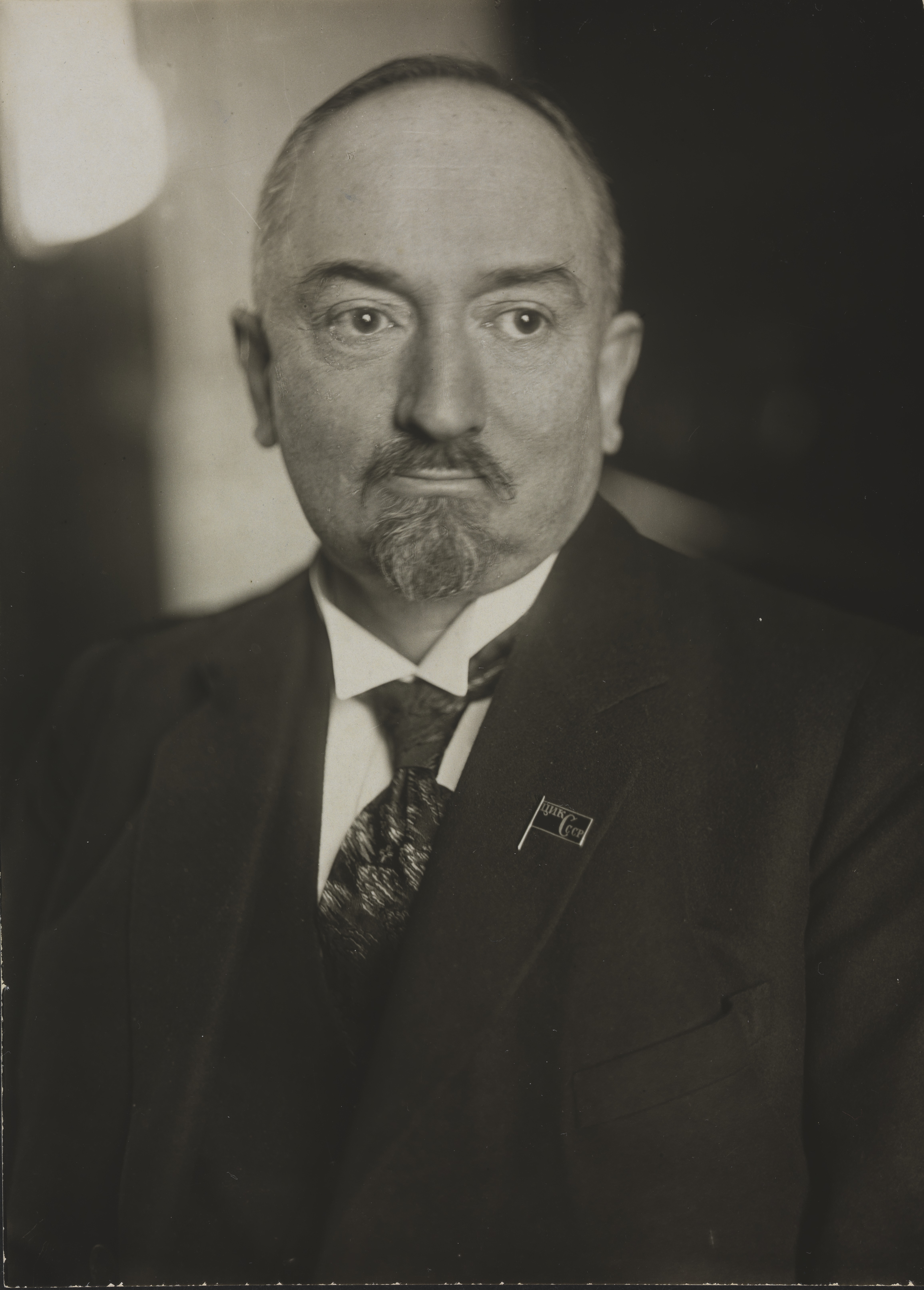
Foreign Minister Georgy Chicherin

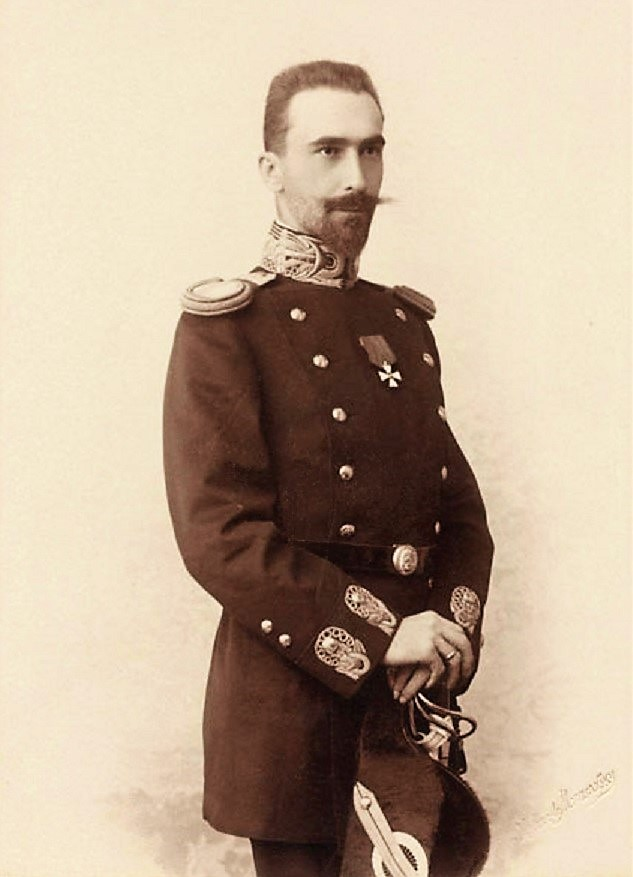
Lohmann discussed collaborating on submarine development with Yevgeny Berens, Commander of Soviet Naval Forces

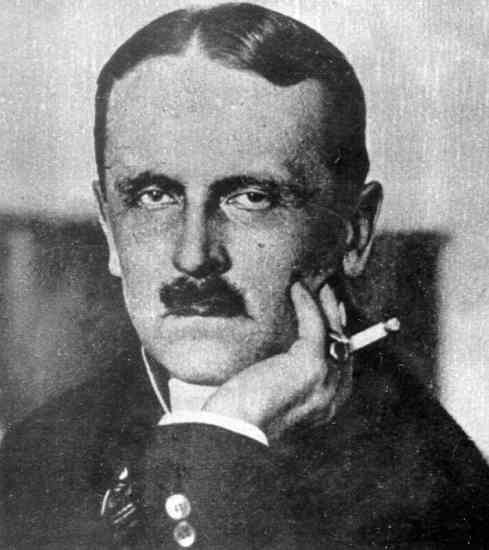
Ambassafor Brockdorff-Rantzau was kept informed of Lohmanns discussions

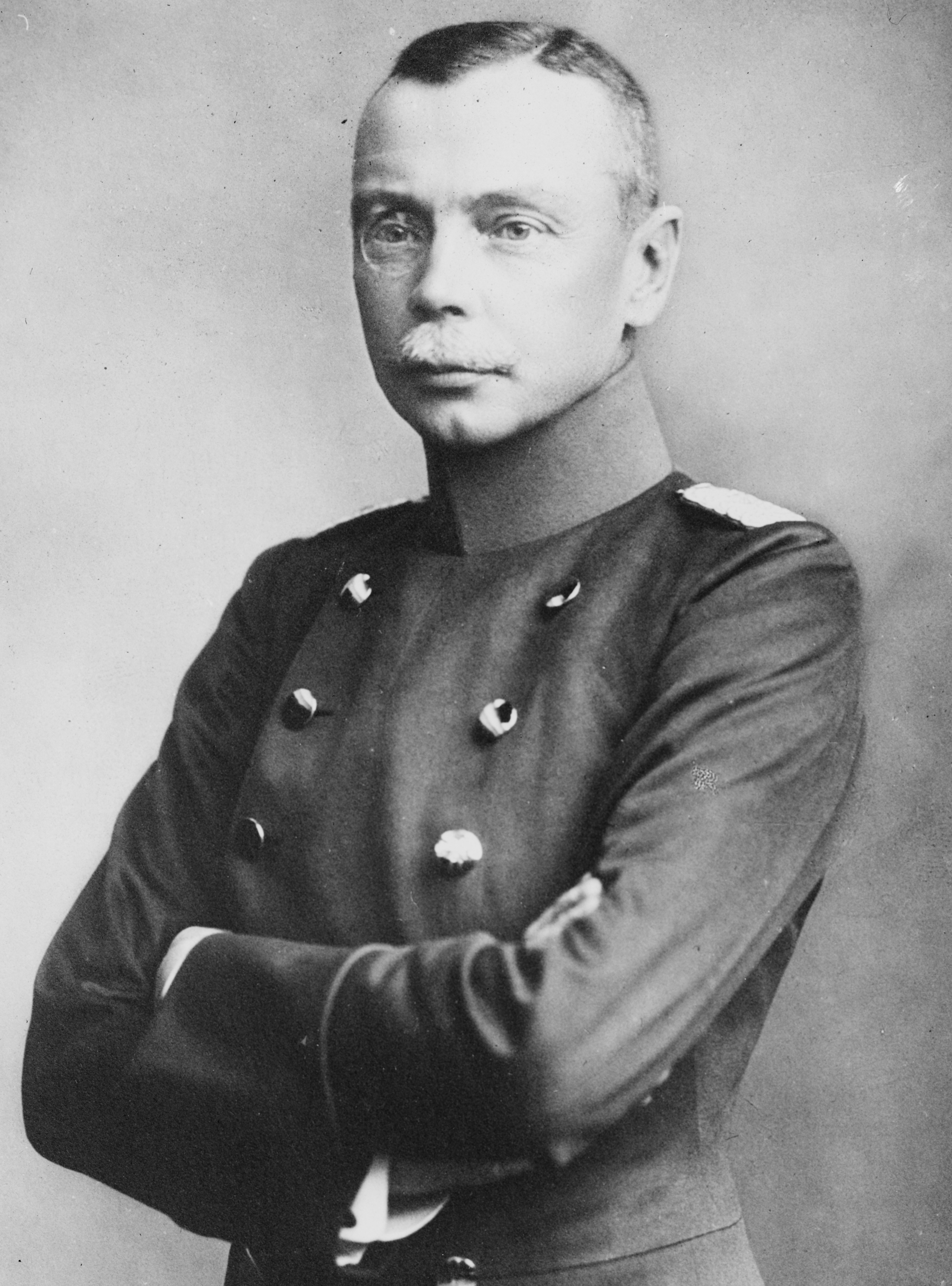
Hans von Seeckt, did much to ensure Lohmanns negotiations with Soviets command didn't go to plan

==== NV Ingenieurskantoor voor Scheepsbouw ====
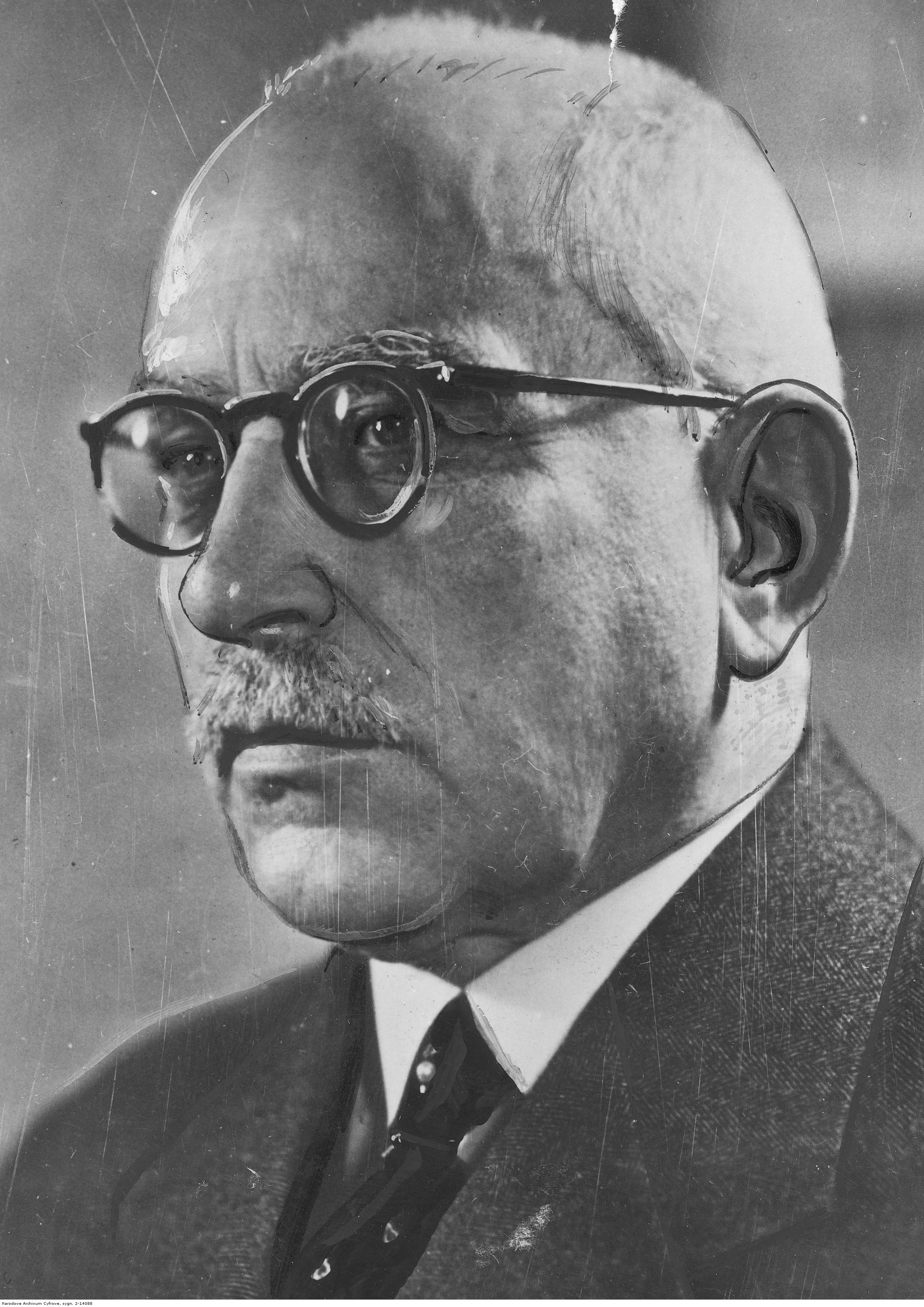
Naval architect Hans Techel moved his engineers to the Netherlands once the IvS started to receive firm orders

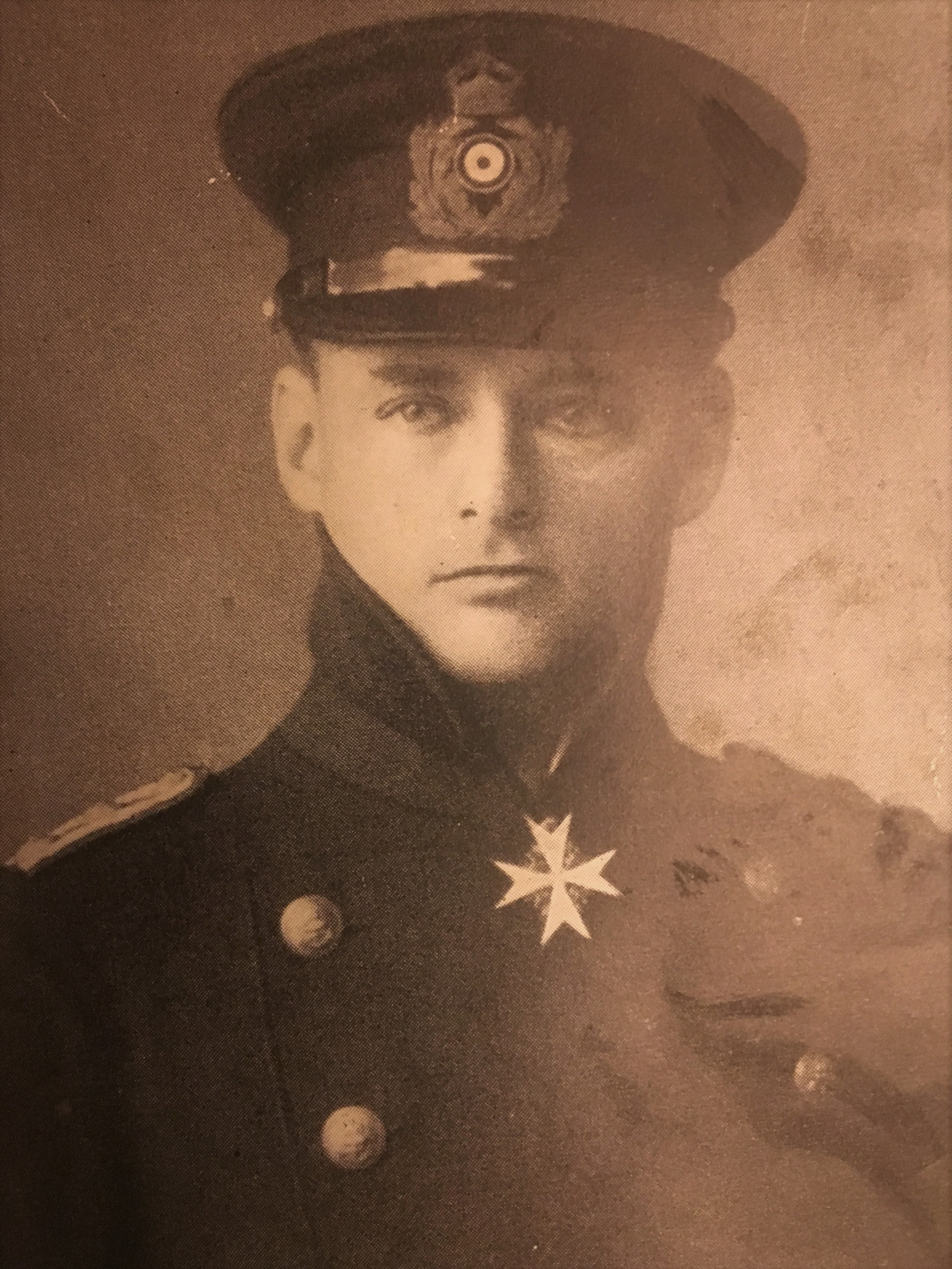
Robert Moraht ran the holding company Mentor-Bilanz GmbH that managed the IvS contracts

In the spring of 1922, on Lohmanns initiative, the NV Ingenieurskantoor voor Scheepsbouw (IvS), a design office established by the Reichsmarines, initially in Kiel, was created in order to maintain and develop German submarine design expertise. This was something that could only be done abroad, in essence to circumvent the limitations established by the Treaty of Versailles. The IvS was founded as an umbrella organisation by three German shipyards, AG Weser in Bremen, Friedrich Krupp Germaniawerft owned by Krupp in Kiel and AG Vulcan Stettin (located in Stettin and Hamburg). Many of the submarines of World War I were designed by Hans Techel and built at the Germania shipyard in Kiel. The IvS established contracts with two Dutch shipyards, De Schelde in Vlissingen and Fijenoord in Rotterdam and specified that 25% of the construction costs would be paid to IvS in fees for each submarine design. Without the help of these shipyards and others like it, Germany wouldn't have been able to develop new submarine designs during the period of the treaty.

The design office initially had difficulties attracting new orders and almost went bankrupt. The Reichsmarine specified exactly what type of submarines it would require in the future and had instructed the design office on what to build. The company signed contracts with Argentina, Italy, Estonia at below market price and Spain for six submarines. However, none of the designs led to firm orders. In spring 1925, the first construction order came from Turkey to build 2 500-ton submarines in the Fijenoord shipyard. Lohmann was kept informed of the negotiations for the contract by the IvS commercial director, Ulrich Blum and Otwi-Werke employee, "Gerber". To ensure the yards were competitive going forward, Lohmann provided 1,000,000RM as startup funding. Naval Command decided to build the submarines below cost as there was some doubt as to whether Turkey could pay the construction costs. When the contract was signed, 12 German engineers from the Kiel shipyard including Techel opened a design office in The Hague, to design the first u-boat.

In 1925, Lohmann worked with Reichsmarine officer Robert Moraht to secure a submarine contract from the Soviet Union worth 30-50 million RM that had been held back for more than 2 years. At a meeting on 8 June 1925 between Moraht, the IvS and Turkish representatives secured the financing needed to build the Turkish submarines. These two contracts ensured the financial stability of IvS. When the funding announcement was made, representatives of the three German shipyards approached Naval Command with a request to leave the IvS consortium due to financial constraints in Germany, leaving Naval Command to assume the entire project risk. To manage the 28% of shares that Naval Command held in the IvS and all other submarine contracts, Lohmann created the holding company Mentor-Bilanz GmbH in 1925 that was managed by Robert Moraht. At the end of 1925, a submarine department was founded in Naval Command and ran by Admiral Arno Spindler to manage the company within the military.

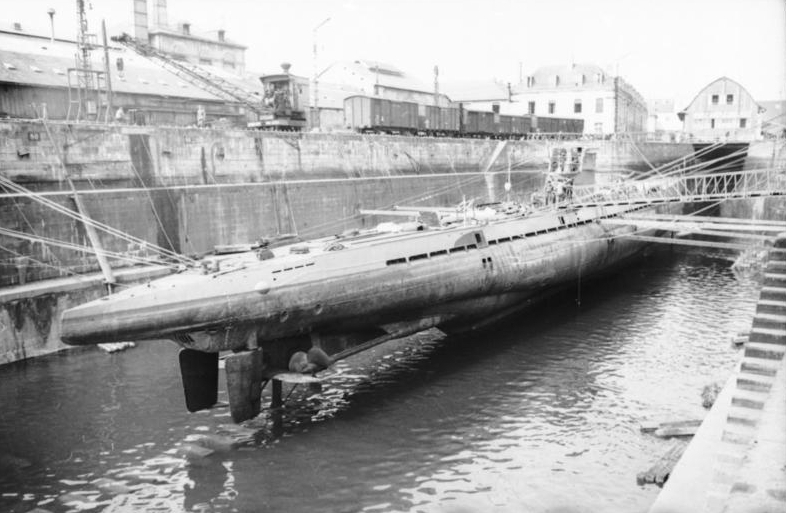
U-37. An early example of a Type IXA submarine, docked in Lorient in 1940

By June 1927, Lohmann clearly understood that Naval Command had to develop a series of prototype submarines that could be tested and optimised during sea trials. The prototype would be then be sold and the money used to design and construct a new superior prototype. The first was a 755-ton submarine that began in the Cadiz shipyard in the beginning of February 1929. By 1930, the plan had faltered when Prime Minister of Spain Miguel Primo de Rivera died, resulting in the completed u-boat being sold to Turkey at a loss. Even after Lohmann left Naval Command in disgrace, the prototypes were still being designed and built. They led to a professionalisation of the submarine service, ultimately leading to a 900-ton IvS designed unit, that eventually became the Type IX submarine. When World War II began, Naval Command was amply prepared for submarine warfare due to this interwar work.

==== Aircraft ====
Although the Treaty of Versailles prohibited the formation of the German airforce, Lohmann still took steps to maintain naval air power. In 1925, he purchased 76% of the shares in the aircraft manufacturer Caspar-Werke, located in Travemünde. The purchase of the shares was managed by Berliner Bankverein AG and the deal arranged in a manner to ensure the Reichswehr did not appear as the main shareholder.

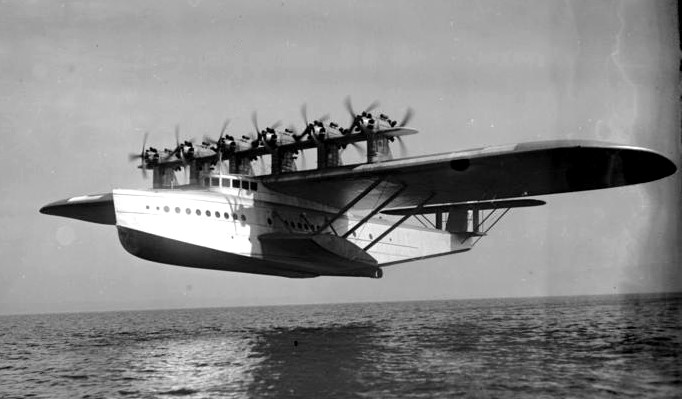
The monies used to build the Dornier Do X aircraft were provided by loan arranged by Lohmann from Deutsche Bank

The company had some initial success with the Caspar C 24 that won the Deutschlandflug competition, although the company never became profitable even with the injection of new funding by Lohmann. The department that built the C24 was expanded and became a new standalone legal entity that was attached the ministry's naval aviation department, Gruppe BSx (Allgemeines Marineamt Seetransportabteiling) and funded by Lohmann. In 1925, Lohmann secured a 3.5million RM loan from Deutsche Bank, to build a seaplane manufacturing facility in Altenrhein, Switzerland, to develop the Dornier Do X, in a joint project between Dornier Flugzeugwerke and Luftschiffbau Zeppelin. Profits from the project were accrued by Lohmann. The Ministry of Economics (Reichswirtschaftsministerium), the Reich Ministry of Labour and the Reich Ministry of Transport were involved in establishing the project.

By 1927, Lohmann had invested 1.5million RM in Caspar-Werke, but the company was losing money. He decided to divest the shares and began negotiations with Hamburg America Line (Hapag) but was unable to secure a sale. The company continued operating after Lohmann left the ministry in 1927 as a test centre for seaplanes, aircraft catapults and naval radio equipment.While he was negotiating the sale, he worked on the development of catapult launchers on passenger ships.

==== Speedboats ====
Lohmann was directly involved as both financier and mastermind in the secret development of speedboat armaments in violation of the Versailles Treaty. Lohmann became involved in 1923, when he tried to sell the Reichsmarine speedboat flottilla to the Soviet Union as they were in violation of the treaty, but they were uninterested. In 1924, Lohmann founded Travemünder Yachthafen AG (Trayag) in the northern German port of Travemünde on the Priwall Peninsula, to provide mooring berths and manufacturing facilities for the development of a new speedboat design. At Trayag, 13 speedboats that were equipped with torpedo tubes were designed with unofficial funds procured by Lohmann. The initial cost for establishing the project was 450,000RM and yearly cost for development approximately 150,000 to 200,000RM. To ensure the speedboats did not appear as official Reichsmarine shipping, they were registered as owned by the Lohmann founded, Navis GmBH, a covert shipping and administrative company. The extensive testing program on each design that was run by Trayag on behalf of the Reichsmarine was intended to provide the basis for future Schnellboot construction. In 1925, Lohmann purchased a shipyard in Wagria and formed "Neustädter Slip GmbH" as an additional repair base and training facility for technical personnel. This was followed up in February 1925 by Lohmann forming the German High Seas Sports Association (HANSA). As part of that organisation, the Hanseatic Yacht School was established to train personnel in seamanship and radio communications. In 1926, Lohmann paid the Motor Yacht Club of Germany (Motoryachtclub von Deutschland e.V.) 60,000Reichsmarks to recommend the speedboats being developed by Trayag to club members. Lohmann also paid for the design of a 1000 hp engine by MAN SE.

==== War materials ====
Lohmann had contact with the Swedish munitions, i.e. gunpowder manufacturer, Skänska Bomullskrutfabriks A.B (SK), in Landskrona, ostensibly to secure the supply of various mines and hand grenades. At the end of 1922, Lohmann through Otto Sprenger began negotiations with Carl Tranchell, the director of SK to collaborate on certain naval projects. Lohmann wished to establish an out-of-country testing operation where he could conduct experiments of a type that couldn't be done in Germany, due to the treaty conditions. The agreement detailed that Tranchell would make his facilities and personnel available to Lohmann, who would provide specialist personnel via Sprenger along with the design itself that would be provided free and both Lohmann and Tranchell would provide the sum necessary to fund the experiments together. In early 1923, agreement was reached and it was decided together to create Carola AG, to supply munitions developed from the collaboration and from Skänska Bomullskrutfabriks A.B itself. Lohmann together with Sprenger conducted sales negotiations with Japanese companies. They also sold in Brazil, Uruguay and Argentina.

==== Oil tankers ====
At the end of 1925, a report was published by the German admiralty that identified a need for three oil tankers that could maintain a minimum speed of 16knots. Correspondence between John T. Essberger, the officer in charge of naval tankers, a department civil servant and an engineer examined the idea of building the oil tankers in a way that they could be used as aircraft carriers known as "aircraft mother ships" as well as "fast boat mother ships". To maintain the contract, Lohmann provided 6.5 million Reichsmarks to the Schichau-Werke shipyard in Elbing, 3 million of which were assigned to build one small tanker. Lohmann's financial engineering ensured that extra money in the contract used to cover interest payments on his loans, were returned to him. By 5 October 1926, Lohmann was the managing director. During his management tenure, Lohmann produced a smaller tanker using funds from the Reich Ministry of Economy.

To build the other two larger tankers, an agreement was reached between Lohmann and the Bremen-based private bank Schröder-Bank, owned by Johann Friedrich Schröder, that was facilitated by the Bremen finance minister for a loan of 12million RM. Bremen-based AG Weser shipyard was to receive the contract to build them. As part of the agreement, it was decided the Navy was to construct a steamer at Norddeutscher Lloyd. To finalise the deal, the Bremen finance minister insisted that the loan agreement was approved by naval director Erich Raeder and Reich Finance Minister Heinrich Peckert. At a meeting of 6 May 1926, Lohmann explained his plan of using a 12million loan to construct two large tankers. But Raeder and Peckert were looking for extra value from the contract and stipulated that two smaller tanker would be built alongside the one large tankers.

By buying two smaller tankers, instead of a third large tanker as already planned, Lohmann used the savings to create the Berlin Oil Transport Company that he owned outright, the Bremen Oil Transport Company that he also owned, as well as a freight forwarding company. In mid-1926, Lohmann had plans to create a vertically integrated oil company similar to BP but the idea was abandoned, due to the complexities of the plan and the huge amount of monies involved to finance it. Although at the same time he continued to invest in the oil transport companies.

==== Spa steamers ====
Another aspect of Lohmann's vision was the subsidising of in-shore pleasure craft that could be modified for naval operations. That included ensuring the ships were capable of a minimum speed of 18 knots, being available for naval exercise for at least 14 days per year and have basic structure that could be converted for naval operations, for example to store ammunition in a magazine, or the ability to support deck guns up to 160 tons.

==== Rotor ship Barbara ====
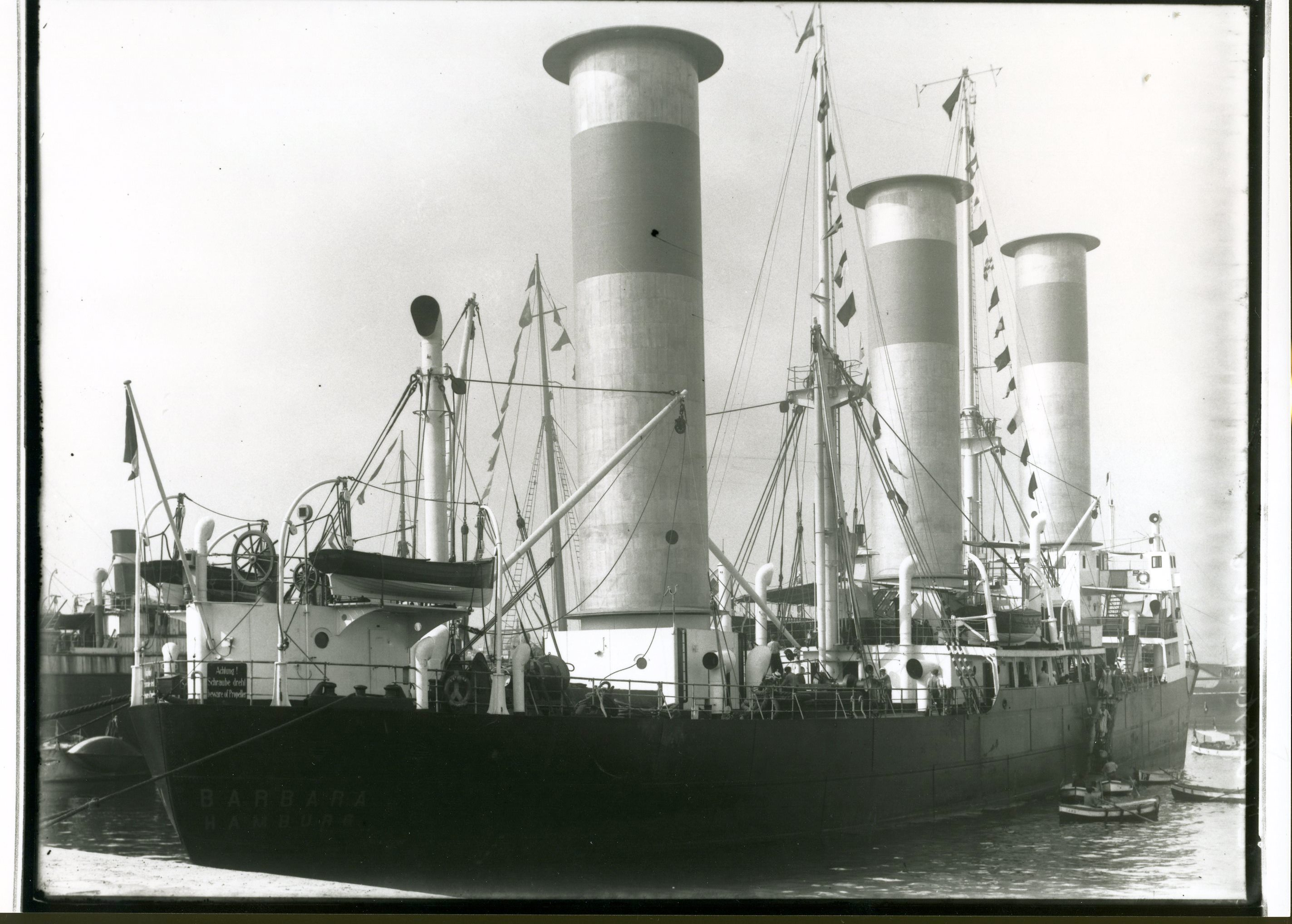
Rotor ship Barbara, photographed in 1926 in Barcelona

When the rotor ship Barbara was commissioned, half the monies for construction were arranged by Lohmann from the Reichmarine budget and half was provided by the Reich Ministry of Economics. At the same time, the funding also covered the end of life maintenance of the decommissioned minelayer SMS Albatross and the construction of the steamships MV Bessel (initially known as the Sorrento) and Amalfi (Note: Renamed the Euler in 1940 when it was commissioned by the Kriegsmarine. The Euler hit a mine on 4 October 1940 in St. Nazaire.) at A.G. Weser. The Barbara was built by the shipyard A.G. Weser in Bremen. Lohmann's wife conducted the ceremonial launch of the ship.

The Barbara's first voyage to Italy and Spain were used by Lohmann to sell the idea of rotor cargo ships to various contacts and used a film created by Phoebus Film to promote them. His first port of call was to meet the Spanish king Alfonso XIII. Lohmann also met with Benito Mussolini in November 1926 to discuss an order for an 11000ton tanker that would use the rotor mechanism, but nothing came of the meeting.

==== Military training ====
As well as funding many different capital projects, Lohmann ensured that suitable personnel were trained in an on-going basis, an activity that was a clear violation of Article 177 of the Treaty of Versailles. The Hanseatic Yacht School in Neustadt was established in 1925 to train personnel in seamanship and radio communications in speedboats. Military personnel were sent to be trained by the High Seas Sports Association (HANSA) in Berlin. Lohmann believed that early training of sailors was important as it gave them the ability to issue orders later in life, in a way that was effective. As well as providing training for sailors to a military standard, naval pilots were also trained in Neustadt. Lohmann provided 60000marks to train an initial 60 students.

=== Organisational projects ===
==== Defence economy ====
Central to Lohmann's ability to organise and run a successful naval defence organisation was the Navis company. Navis not only maintained ownership of Lohmanns clandestine assets, for example speedboats, but also transacted private business with other organisations. However, Lohmann established several other companies for clandestine work for specific purposes. The first of these companies was "Mentor-Bilanz", an ultra-secret organisation in 1925 that purchased Amsterdam based Aerogeodetic (Naamlooze Vennootschap Aerogeodetic) that manufactured gyroscopes. He established a Berlin branch of the organisation in 1926. In February 1925, Lohman founded Tebeg (Technische Beratung und Beschaffung GmbH) to run the naval defence economy with company shares held by Navis. Tebeg's remit was to "draw up a comprehensive armament plan that would regulate the securing and distribution of raw materials, manufacturing facilities and workers" and was funded to the tune of 120,000marks that came from various departments within the Reichsmarine. The rearmamenent plan developed by Tebeg called for the fasted possible commissioning of submarines.

==== Intelligence service ====
From October 1920, i.e. shortly after he was promoted, Lohmann worked to centralise intelligence gathering within Naval Command, so he could influence decisions. His first success in November 1920 was to reroute reports from the Rücktransporten von Kriegsgefangenen (Krifa) prisoner of war ships to the sea transport division. He also succeeded in persuading the London Naval attache to forward reports that would be a good source of intelligence. In December 1920, he tried to recruit Bremen senator Heinrich Bömers as a channel to Naval Command for forwarding the intelligence, but failed. In July 1921, the commander of the Bremen Naval Command informed him that reports passing between the command and the Bremen foreign office would be an ideal source of intelligence. Lohmann used this new channel to indirectly influence the Federal Foreign Office in Berlin.

This was followed by the payment of a stipend to the representatives of the Naval Transportation Division in Saint Petersburg and Leningrad to report on the movements of the Red Army and Soviet Navy. However, Lohmann was never satisfied with the quality of reports that the representatives were sending but would still make special requests, for example, in June 1924 he requested the composition of the Russian naval officer corps. After trying to financialise the naval transportation office in St Petersburg and failed, Lohmann attempted to establish a Russian company known as "Merotwal" (illegal under Russian law) that was to be used to pay agents of the naval representatives and at the same time, rent out a fleet of Reichsmarine cars that had been left in Saint Petersburg, before the war. In essence, it was an attempt to coordinate German-Soviet trade relations with a Lohmann associate "Lambert" in Berlin and at the same time earn more money. Lohmann attempted to keep the arrangement secret from both the Federal Foreign office and the German consulate in Saint Petersburg, but the venture failed when his associate was arrested in December 1923 for violating the foreign trade laws, in an operation not connected to Lohmann. Lohmann never returned to the venture after the winter break, due to unexpected resistance from within Naval Command, the low value of the intelligence he was receiving and other failures.

He also received intelligence reports from the German diplomat Heinrich Karl Fricke who served in the German consul in Cartagena, Spain. Fricke reported on the Spanish government, the Navy, the Admiralty as well as providing economic news regarding the speedboat market in Spain. Through Fricke, Lohmann was able to bribe Spanish officials to award a contract to Navis to salvage the Spanish battleship España that ran aground off Cape Tres Forcas on 26 August 1923.

==== Phoebus Film AG ====
As early as mid-1923, Lohmann had become interested in Phoebus Film AG, a film production company that by 1927 had become the third largest in Germany. That interest had been sparked by his friendship with Ernst Hugo Correll, a company director who invited Lohmann to join his hunting club. Through Correll, Lohmann was able to get a position for Else Ektimov at the company on a salary of 1000 marks per month. Lohmann wanted a film company that could make films that spoke of a German national consciousness, i.e. of the Fatherland, that would be attractive both to German people and overseas film-goers. In particular, Lohmann felt that it was in the national interest to help the company that was struggling and believed that their economic interests were aligned.

By June 1924, Phoebus had issued shares to the value of 1.2million RM and received a loan of 870,000RM, organised by Lohmann. By the end of the year, Lohmann decided to increase his holdings in the film company to both attain greater control and provide the necessary capital to enable the company to build an in-house production facility. By March 1925, the company agreed to increase its issue to 1.8million shares, which lead Lohmann to invest a further 850,000RM. Lohmann's shares were managed by Lignose AG, the parent company of Phoebus with two accountants from the sea transport department overseeing them. In early-1926, the two accountants reported to Lohmann that Phoebus would need a minumum investment of 3,000,000 Reich Marks for the expansion. Lohmann approached the Minister of the Interior Erich Koch-Weser who Lohmann persuaded by stated that he hoped to use the film company "to influence the press and the public" and that "if everything is not to come irreversibly under American influence..". Koch-Weser approached Finance Minister Peter Reinhold who initially rejected the investment but eventually signed a counter guarantee from DekaBank to Phoebus in March 1926. Both Reinhold and Koch-Weser believed that Lignose would be liable if Phoebus went bankrupt although Lohmann didn't take the guarantee seriously believing the Reich would be liable. Of the 3 million extra funding, 578,000 RM immediately went on interest payments on the previous loans. Lohmann continued to provide loans to Phoebus. By February 1927, a further 3.5million Reichsmarks loan guarantee was provided by Disconto-Gesellschaft bank to Phoebus and a further 920,000 guarantee provided by Mendelssohn & Co bank in June 1927. Lohmann signed these two guarantees himself, as he was worried about repayments. Both Naval Command and the German government were never informed. He stated that "He believed that this had to be avoided at all costs because he feared that it could lead to the guarantee of March 26, 1926, covered by the signature of the ministers, becoming known". By the end of 1927, Lohmann expected a lucrative return on his investment which failed to materialise. He had only received 127,000RM on the share dividend.

When the Lohmann Affair was discovered, the company went bankrupt in the wake of the scandal. In 1928, the Munich-based Bavaria Film (Emelka) bought up the remaining assets of the company. The Reich received 4,000,000 RM from the sale.

==== Die AG Weser ====
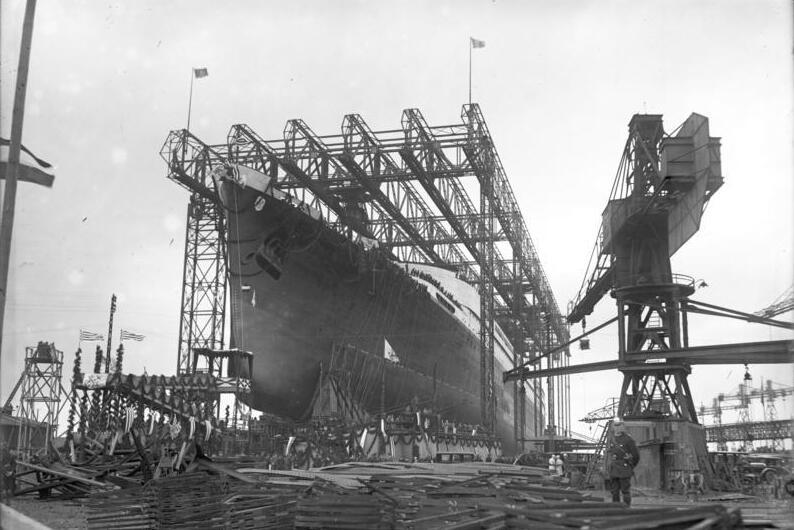
The ceremonial launching of the ocean liner SS Bremen on 16 August 1928 at the AG Weser shipyard

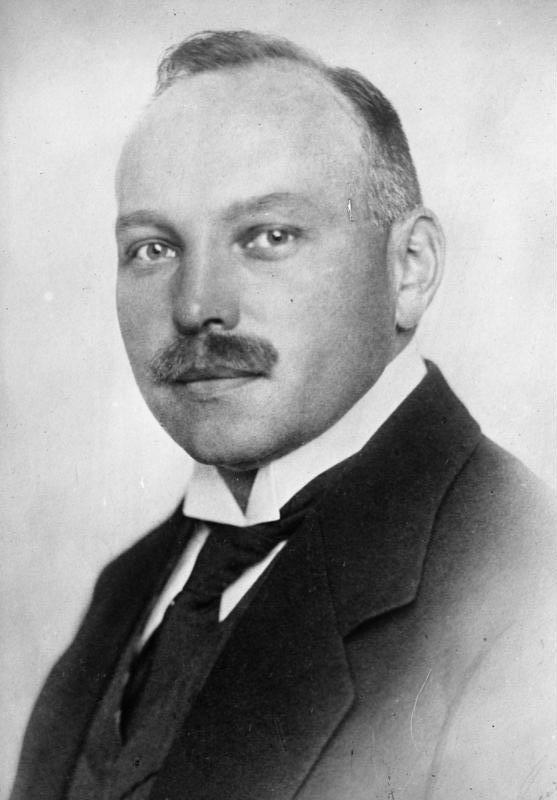
Lohmann arranged the 15million loan through banker Emil von Strauss

A core part of Lohmann's rearmament programme was AG Weser (Aktien-Gesellschaft "Weser") shipbuilders in Bremen. Lohmann had a particular close relationship with its chairman Otto Sprenger, who had invested his war profits in such a way that enabled Lohmann to avoid an initial investment in the company. However, he had to take a more risky position, when Sprenger damaged his reputation during a dispute with Norddeutscher Lloyd and had to leave in January 1925. Lohmann ordered Moraht to sell Sprenger shares in AG Weser, which took some months. By December 1925, Lohmann had formed a consortium and placed the share package with Schröder Bank that included a loan agreement, where he could buy a 51% stake at 3.3 million marks at any point in the next 5 years with first refusal on any share block. In essence, he was planning to buy the whole shipyard. The interest on the loans, 330,000 marks annually were paid by Schröder.

In late 1926, the yard had received orders for two oil tankers and by that point Lohmann had decided to proceed with buying the whole yard. At the time, Schröder was conducting a merger of AG Weser and eight other shipyards, that resulted in the formation of Deutsche Schiff- und Maschinenbau (Deschimag). On 10 December 1926, Lohmann approached Emil Georg von Stauss of Deutsche Bank for a loan of 15 million marks to support both yards with the expectation of new orders being received after the tankers were completed. The first new order received was the ocean liner SS Bremen. Later orders included tankers and fishing trawlers. However, when the Bremen was completed in July 1929, Deschimag and many other shipyards suffered an economic catastrophe due to a worldwide surplus of merchant shipping.

In a letter to Brockdorff-Rantzau sent on 22 February 1923, Lohmann described Sprenger as a very rich individual, who as owner of his own factories could make unilateral investment decisions without external input. At the time, Sprenger was planning to invest in Lohmann's Russian deal, which failed to materialise. On 8 March 1923, Lohmann requested that Sprenger open an account at the Mendelssohn & Co private bank to be used through the Otwi-Werke office in Berlin. Lohmann used the Otwi-Werke company office in Berlin as a contact point and in a number of financial business deals at the unobtrusive bank that weren't particularly legal. In late 1925, a dispute arose between Franz Stapelfeldt, the director of Deschimag and Sprenger who was used to making his own decisions, that resulted in Lohmann's confidente in the company "Gerber" being fired. This caused difficulties for Lohmann and from that point forward he only dealt with Stapelfeldt in business related to the shipyards.

==== Industrial collaboration ====
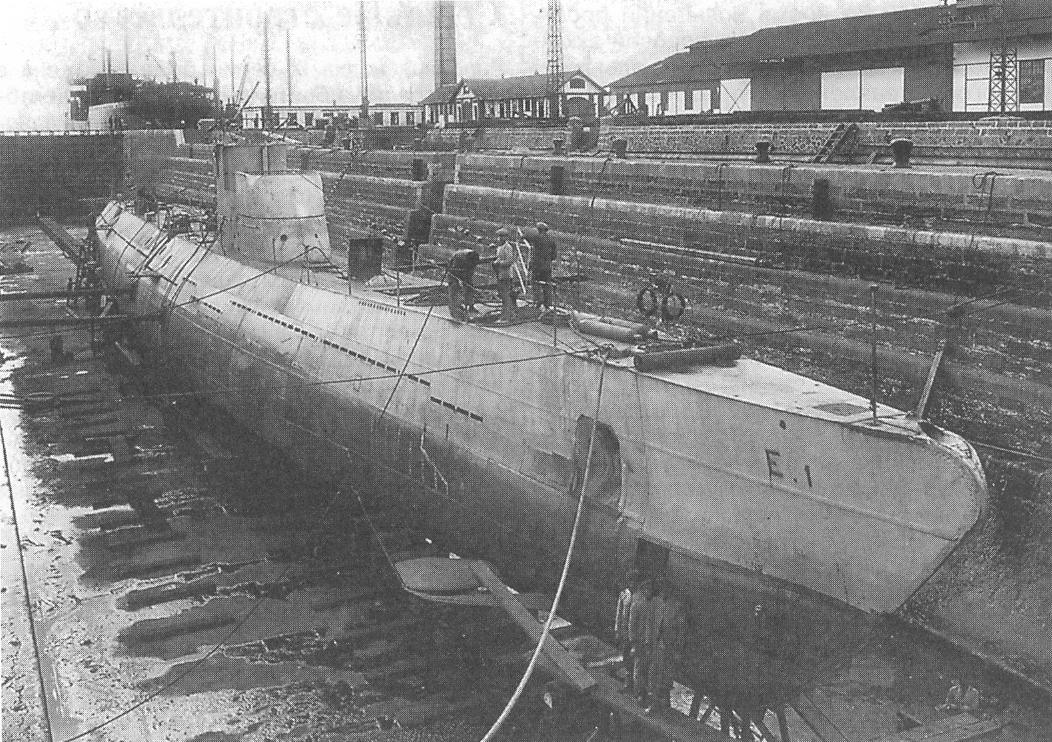
Submarine E-1 built in the Echevarrieta y Larrinaga Shipyard in Cádiz, Spain in 1929–30. It was the prototype of the German Type IA submarine

After the Occupation of the Ruhr in 1923, the German military was forced to reexamine its rearmament plans in light of the Versailles treaty. After approaching potential industrial partners in Russia, Japan and Argentina to rebuild their navy offshore, they settled on Spain as their preferred industrial partner. In January 1925, IvS director Ulrich Blum along with a delegation that included Spanish speaking Wilhelm Canaris visited Spain to negotiate for the construction of German submarines and ships. Canaris recommended Spanish businessman and industrialist Horacio Echevarrieta as a partner and the Reichswehr invited him to visit Germany in the summer of 1926.

In 1926, Lohmann began to collaborate on projects with Echevarrieta. and established a joint holding company that would manage it. Through contacts with King Alfonso XIII and General Miguel Primo de Rivera, Echevarrieta had won a contract, arranged by Lohmann, to build a 750-ton submarine by German technicians in Cádiz, based on the PU-111 model of 1918, that would be designed by IvS for German Naval Command. Echevarrieta became bankrupt as his shipyard "Echevarrieta y Larrinaga Shipyard" was chronically underfunded and couldn't fulfill the contract, so Lohmann arranged to provide the full costs of the contract through Naval Command. The submarine with designation submarino E-1 was sold by Naval Command to Turkey to partially recoup costs, after Miguel Primo de Rivera fell from power in January 1930, along with his government.

The first project that Lohmann completed in 1925-1926 and supervised by Wilhelm Canaris, was the construction of a torpedo factory in Cadiz, in which German Naval Command Torpedo Research Institute played a major role in developing. The factory was able to develop two production ready torpedo models that were used in World War II. Lohmann wrote:

"In order to support Echevarrieta in this project, which is very important for us, and to enable him to compete against the increasingly strong influence of the English through particularly favorable financing offers, I got him a long-term loan from the Deutsche Bank with the help of a counter-guarantee from the Reich".

While German Foreign Minister Gustav Stresemann and Finance Minister Peter Reinhold were generally in favour of the collaboration, other members the German foreign office believed that Spains contracts with the English government made it unsuitable as a business partner. The reason for this was that the British Vickers Shipbuilding and Engineering had extensive shipbuilding contracts in Spain that was in effect a monopoly. However, King Alfonso XIII expressed an interest in purchasing German naval armaments, for example fire-control systems, which swayed their decision to continue the collaboration. Lohmann planned to expand the torpedo factory to develop aircraft capable of dropping a torpedo as well as develop new speedboat models. Several speedboats were sent for testing at Echevarrieta's Cadiz shipyard. Even after Lohmann departed his position, Echevarrieta was willing to build 8 new speedboats to a new design produced by the Trayag successor company.

An oil transport company was also planned in detail with Echevarrieta. As part of the contract, the shipbuilder AG Wasser had to build two oil tankers, designed to be fast naval supply steamers. They were financed by the Spanish government for Spain who insisted they be built in Cadiz. In spring 1927, Canaris explored the idea of establishing a naval shipyyard in Cadiz to build the ships but the idea was abandoned. Canaris commented:

"The German Navy has recently been working on drawing up design plans for oil tankers that could be converted quickly and at low cost into transport and aircraft mother ships with sufficiently high speeds in the event of mobilization. M.L. is prepared to make these plans available to you [Echevarrieta] and will send them to you in the near future".

Lohmann arranged a 15million Reichsmarks loan from Deutsche Bank to fund the joint holding company and demanded that the arrangement remain strictly confidential "because certain military interests of a highly secretive nature are to be taken into account".

Lohmann and Canaris were involved in other business negotiations with Echevarrieta. In the summer 1927, Canaris provided a summary of communications for Naval Command involving Echevarrieta, where they discussed the film industry, naval mine production, and trawler design. They also discussed establishing a civilian airline with aircraft production by Lufthansa, Junkers to build the planes and Mercedes to build the engines. Echevarrieta established the Madrid-based airline, Iberia, Compañía Aérea de Transportes, that was incorporated on 28 June 1927 with a capital investment of 1.1 million pesetas by Echevarrieta and Deutsche Luft Hansa holding 27% of the shares. The exploitation of the Spanish colony of Rio Muni was also discussed and Lohmann used his private capital in a contract.

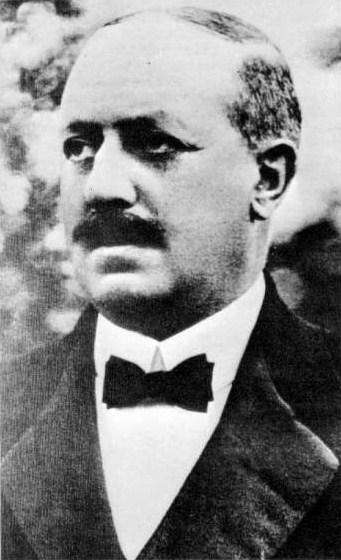
The spanish industrialist Horacio Echevarrieta, collaborated with Lohmann who saved his shipyard from bankruptcy

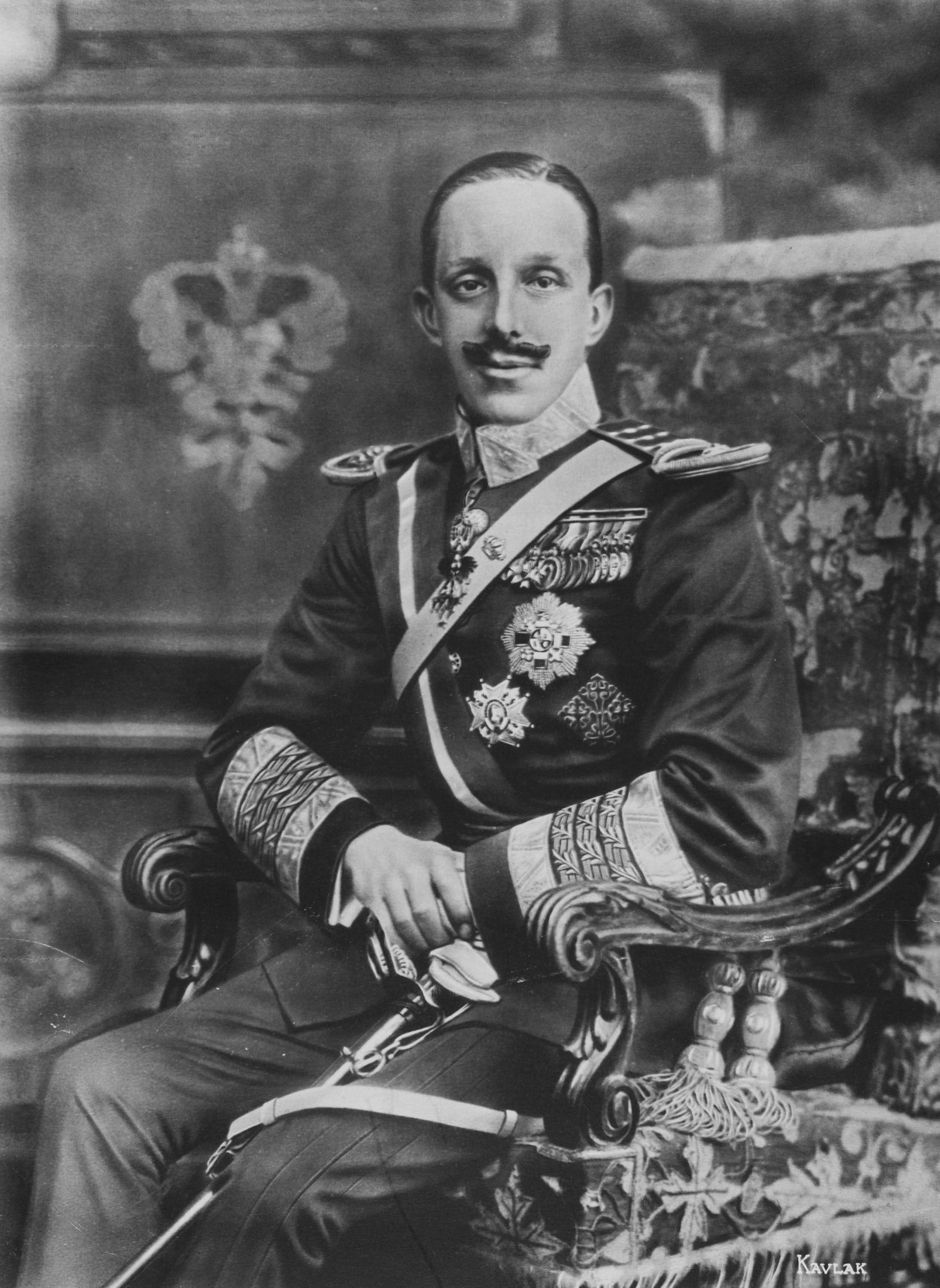
King Alfonso XII sought to buy German armaments that included submarines

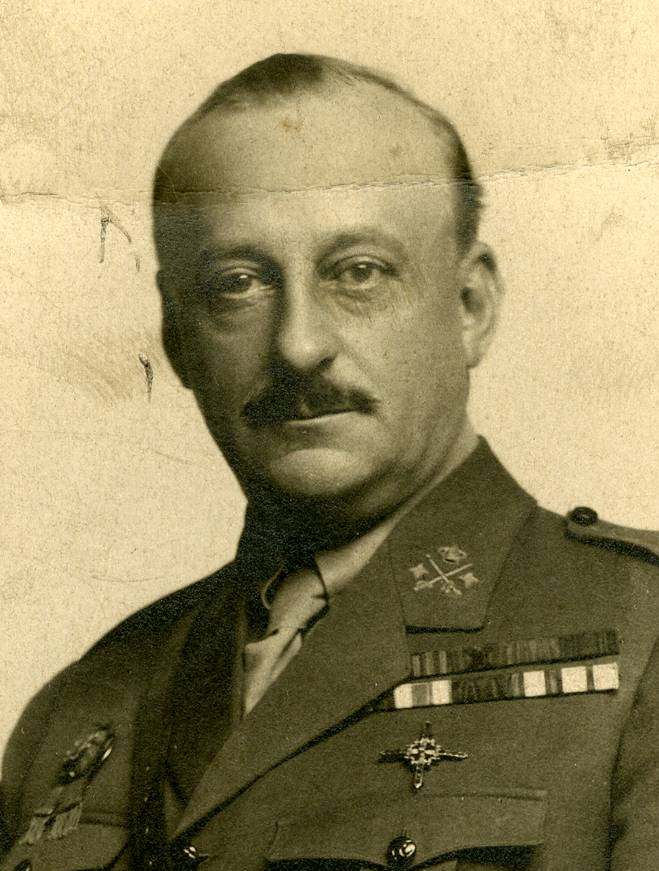
General Miguel Primo de Rivera sought to modernise the Spanish military after the Spanish failures in the Rif War

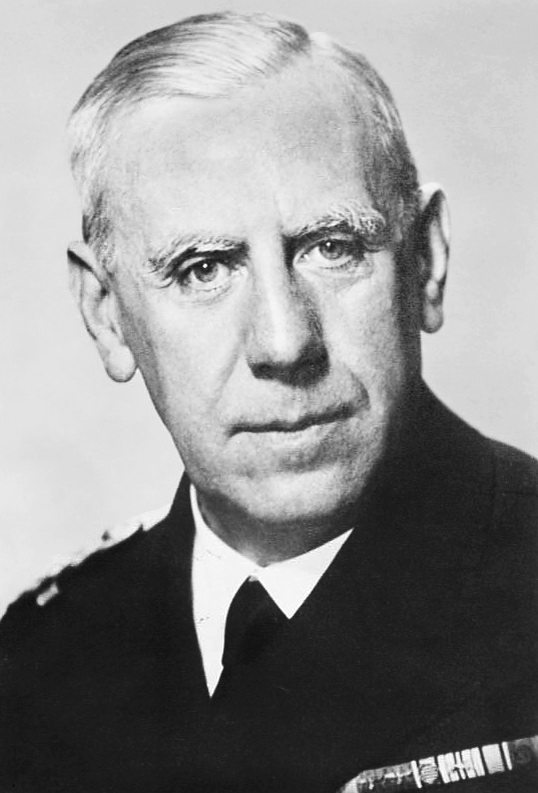
Canaris was naval command envoy in Madrid and supervised the contracts signed between Lohmann and the Spanish government

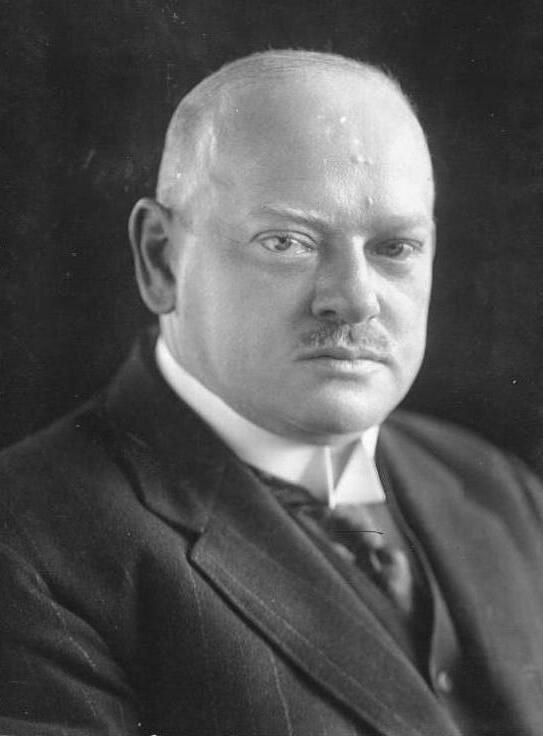
German foreign Minister Gustav Stresemann favoured Lohmanns contracts with the Spanish although other ministers in the cabinet disagreed

==== Paul Lohmann ====
In October 1926, Lohmann began working closely with Paul Lohmann (no relation), a German businessman and arms dealer. In April 1927, together with the Polish owners of a patent "Huragan mill patent", Lohmann created several joint holding companies to exploit the new invention for the firing of puliverised coal dust in a mill designed for grinding corn. Lohamm provided funding of 620,000RM to build a prototype which was contracted to Weser AG, but a practical unit could not be built and the monies were lost. Lohmann believed both the army and navy would be interested and stated of the invention:

"the army command was particularly interested because these mills would probably make it possible for even the smallest unit in the field to immediately grind confiscated or found grain and bake it into bread".

In the summer of 1927, Lohmann received funding of 10,000RM for further patent evaluation that involved a fuel testing study, which exprimented with a secret fuel mixture suitable for burning in the mill. He received a further 200,000RM loan in the expectation that the device coud be marketed. In July 1928, Lohmann sought to market the mill in America, as he believed it would be attractive as a product that could be supported by the coal mining sector. In that way, he planned to use it to build a ship patents company with the "Huragan mill patent" as the first patent in the companies portfolio. It was to be designed as an offshoot of the maritime transport department who planned to patent their ship designs and licence those designs in America. However the device didn't work and the companies were forced into bankruptcy.

==== Karl Reichenbach ====
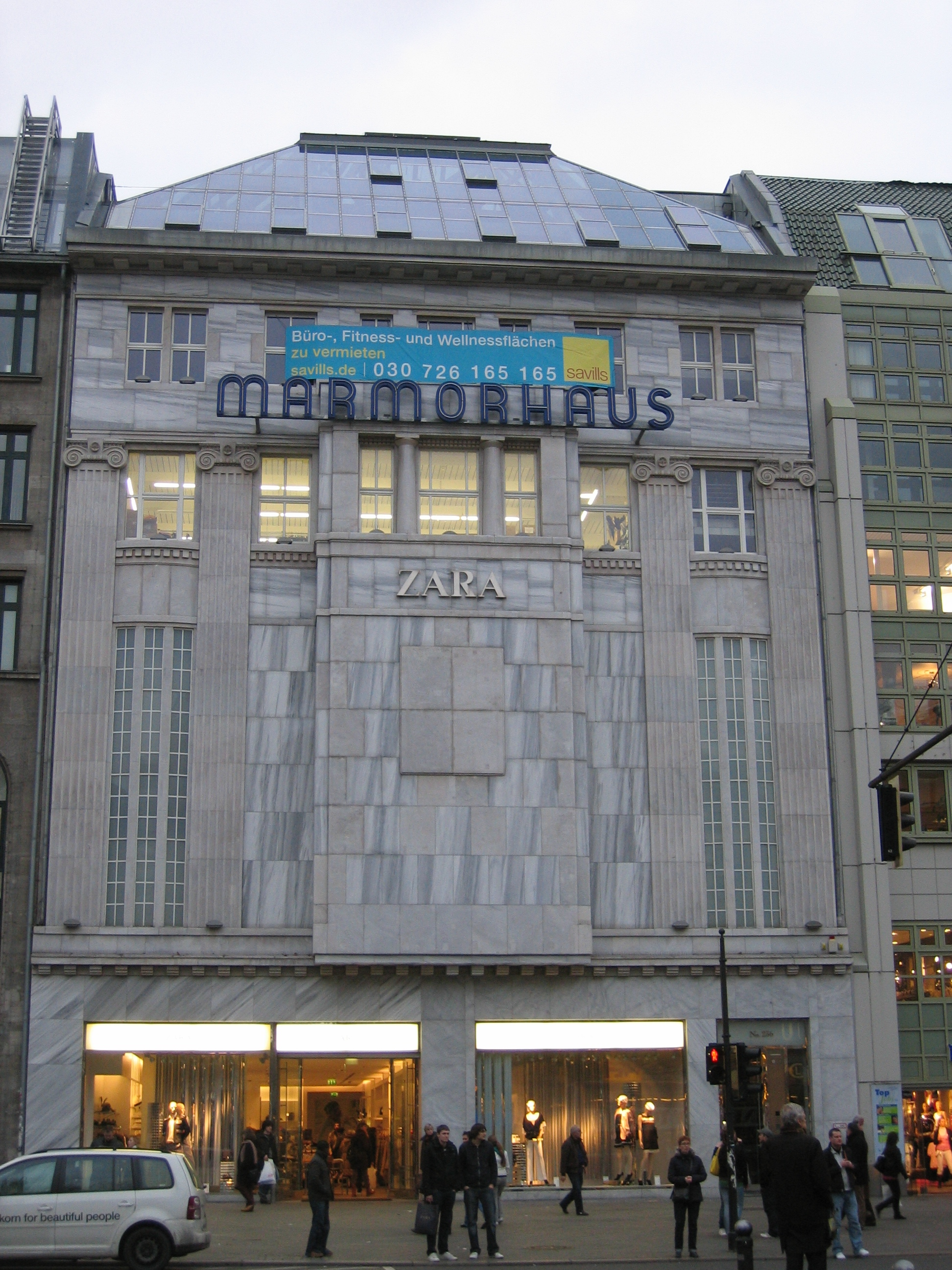
Lohmann leased the Marble House cinema in Kurfürstendamm in Berlin, a business deal that was far outside his military remit

In the autumn of 1924, Lohmann began working with property developer and estate agent Karl Reichenbach. Lohmann leased the Marble House cinema in Berlin for Phoebus Film from Reichenbach, who was paid 40,000 RM in commission, In February 1925 in collaboration with Admiral Wilhelm Kahlert director of the Naval office, Lohmann purchased a residential property at Lützowufer 3, next to Naval Command that was as used to host Navis, Hansa and Tebeg personnel. The property cost 588,000RM including fees and rent, which was below market value. At the time it would have been illegal to purchase residential property without the use of black funds. Reichenbach was asked to keep the arrangement secret. Lohmann also purchased a property at Tiergartenstrasse 16 for 1.9 million RM, located at the rear of the Ministry of the Reichswehr. Again far below market value, in an attempt to stop it being purchased as the new American embassy and well as free up space for the Reichswehr ministry.

Although Ulrich Fritze was fine with the purchases, the April 1926 business deal that Lohmann arranged with Reichenbach and the German banking firm Schneidler for the purchase of an abattoir was described by Fritze as "grotesque". Lohmann paid 485,000 RM for the business while Reichenbach provided 15,000RM in equity. However, Reichenbach would have made a yearly return of 199,000 RM which Lohmann would only make a return on 131,000 RM. The business was facing losses and needed to expand to survive. In September 1926, Reichenbach suggested that formation of a company that could sell bacon to England. Lohmann seized on the idea as he hoped to both disrupt the lucrative Danish bacon business to England and at the same time build a fleet of refrigerated merchant ships that could be converted in the event of war into troop ships. Lohmann approached Admiral Zenker to discuss the idea who found it to be ill-conceived but Lohmann continued anyway. In February 1927, Lohmann formed a holding company, the Berliner Bacon Company with a total investment of 750,000RM by July 1927. Lohmann continued to invest in the company, but falling pork prices forced the company into bankruptcy, eventually costing the treasury 1.25million RM. In May 1927, Lohmann made a further investment on the advice of Reichenbach in a mine, totalling 340,000RM but the venture failed resulting in bankruptcy in the early 1930s.

==== Berliner Bankverein AG ====
Lohmann worried about how secret his business deals were. He considered the Deutsche Bank, where he obtained his largest loans, too large to effectively maintain that confidentiality. Lohmann believed that Deutsche Bank was too risky as it held foreign assets, that left it open to foreign auditors who could potentially discover his loans. He had also little trust in the Bremen-based Schröder Bank, as he considered it too remote and outside his control; so he decided what he needed was his own small reliable bank with no foreign holdings. In 1923, he began searching for a small bank that he could purchase sufficient shares to gain control of the board. Berliner Bankverein bank, established as Berliner Makler-Verein in Berlin in 1877 met his needs. After meeting the board in January 1924, Lohmann sought the advice of the directors of Wasser AG in February 1924, when Fritz Saalfeld, a director of the bank, sent Lohmann a statement of accounts of the banks holdings, for financial analysis. In 1924, Lohmann invested 1.5million RM into the bank but it was later discovered by an auditor that the balance sheet had been embellished and the bank was effectively bankrupt. A further loan on 500,000RM in 1925 failed to secure the banks liquidity and it was finally put into liquidation in 1928, resulting in a loss of 2million Reichmarks to the German treasury.

=== Audit investigation outcomes ===
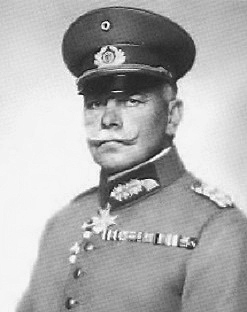
General Heye wanted stricter financial planning and cost controls for the secret rearmanent programme

After the Lohmann affair, there was a wholesale revision of financing, financial planning, cost controls and auditing of secret rearmament programmes within the Reichsmarine. Even before Lohmann activities were exposed in 1927, Chief of Army Command Wilhelm Heye in February 1926 called for better controls and closer political involvement in financial planning and this was further reiterated by President of the Court of Audit Friedrich Saemisch who wished to be released from official secrecy during the investigation. Saemisch recommeneded that "in future a secret budget be drawn up for the secret expenditure of the Wehrmacht. In order to prevent mismanagement, this budget and its use should be monitored by a representative each of the Reich Minister of Defense, the Reich Minister of Finance and the Court of Auditors. A small committee of party leaders would be informed and a link with parliament would be established". The government reformed the proposal to preclude the party leaders and formed the regulation, stating the corresponding expenditure "will be covered by the overall responsibility of the Reich Cabinet when the Reich budget is drawn up and will require its express approval. In order to make it easier for the Reich ministers to ensure that such expenditure is used in accordance with the agreed purpose, a committee will be formed to which the ongoing monitoring of the use of the funds in question will be entrusted. The committee will be composed equally of members of the department of the responsible minister, the Reich Finance Ministry and the Court of Auditors".

=== Financial summaries ===
The following is a set of financial summary tables. These consist of his sources of funding, Lohmanns contract payments, liquidation costs, a payments and obligation summary table and table of guarantees and liabilities. All units are in Reichsmark. Each table row constitutes the total for the period that Lohmann operated for that particular organisation or project.

==== Funding sources ====
Lohmann's funding came from both official budgets, black funds and sale of naval vessels at the end of World War I, along with bank loans. The currency values in this table are in Marks. In 1924, the currency became Reichmarks. Both had the same value.

Table of Sources of Funding
1	Parliamentary funding known as "Ruhrfunds"	10,379,767.74
2	Sale of prisoner of war transports	924,798.52
3	Sale of ships	152,345.00
4	Sale of equipment	150,000
5	Reichsmarine budget	1,145,427.55
6	Loans	6,950,000.00
Total		19,702,338.81

==== Table of Payments ====
Table of Lohmanns private payments
Navis	844,000
Speedboat procurement	600,000
Motor Yacht Club, Wannsee mortgage	60,000
Luhr and Narval boats	657,000
Trayag	1,082,000
Caspar-Werke	1,641,000
Travemünde site	820,000
Hanseatic Yacht School	1,040,000
High Seas Sports Association	750,000
Tebeg	50,000
Baltic Sailing Ship company	54,000
House purchase in Lutzowüfer, Berlin	588,000
Sirius fishing trawler shipping company	1,325,000
Phoebus Film shares loan	2,808,000
Bankverein, shares	1,650,00
Bacon company	1,235,000
Neustädter Slip shipyard and yacht school	346,00
House purchase in Tiergarten	1,895,000
Mine company	340,000
Patent for coal dust driven grain mill	621,000
Fuel prototype for mill	10,000
Salvage Studies Society	78,000
Interest charges	1,500,000
Total	19,949,00

==== Liquidation costs ====
After Lohmann's rearmament programme was discovered, the failing businesses were liquidated and loans paid. This table records these costs.

Table of Payments resulting from liquidation on 15 March 1928
Antiòquia Bank (Bremen)	907,000
Clearing bank repayments	1,330,000
Mortgage repayments	1,750,000
Liabilities for Neustädter Slip	415,000
Bank Association support monies	176,000
Other settlement expenses	144,000
Total	4,722,000

==== Summary of payments ====
Each row of the following table contains summed value of payments by Naval Command. The 1928 4th supplementary budget of the Naval Command budget was allocated to settle final costs.

Table of Summary of Payments
Payments by Lohmann	19,949,00
Payments of settlements to 15 March 1928	4,722,000
Sea trade obligations to 1931	3,000,000
4th supplementary budget, 1928	7,000,000
Total	34,671,000

Table of Guarantees and contingent liabilities
Phoebus Film	7,420,000
Freighter constructions	17,900,000
Norddeutscher Lloyd and Deschimag	1,200,000
Caspar contract	240,000
Total	26,760,000

==== Credit and debits ====
The following describes the final debit and credit tally.

Raw Balance of the Lohmann Fund in March 1928
Passive
Obligations and expenditures	34,671,000
Contingent liabilities	500,000
Total	35,171,000
Active	
Realisation of shares and loan balances	9,290,000
Burdens of Reichswehr	25,871,000
Total	35,161,000

== Awards and honours ==
By the end of the war, Lohmann had been awarded several decorations:

- Iron Cross, 1st and 2nd class,
- Friedrich-August-Cross, 1st and 2nd class,
- Hanseatic Cross of Bremen
- Military Merit Order of Bavaria, 4th class with crown and swords.

== Archives ==
- "Newspaper articles about Walter Lohmann". Hamburg World Economic Archive (in German). Hamburg: Leibniz-Informationszentrum Wirtschaft (ZBW).

== Citations ==
=== Bibliography ===
- Amaro, Rui (22 December 2011). "Euler Cargo Vessel". Ships Nostalgia. VerticalScope Inc.
- Bird, Keith W. (1977). Weimar, the German Naval Officer Corps and the Rise of National Socialism. Amsterdam: Grüner. ISBN 978-90-6032-094-5.
- Belote, James H. (22 December 1993). "The Lohmann Affair" (PDF). Centre for the study of intelligence. CIA.
- Bennett, G. H. (30 December 2023). The War for England's Shores: S-Boats and the Fight Against British Coastal Convoys. Barnsley: Seaforth Publishing. p. 1927. ISBN 978-1-3990-7792-7.
- Carsten, F. L. (1 January 1973). Reichswehr Politics. Berkley: University of California Press. p. 242. ISBN 978-0-520-02492-2.
- Erickson, John (2019). The Soviet High Command: a military-political history, 1918-1941. London: Routledge. ISBN 9780429314759. OCLC 1108552314.
- Gandert, Gero, ed. (2011). Der Film der Weimarer Republik:1929 (in German). Berlin: De Gruyter. ISBN 9783110852615.
- Frost, Günter Frost (March 2019). "Die Flugzeuge der Caspar-Werke in Travemünde" (PDF). ADL-Luft Fahrt Historik (in German). Arbeitsgemeinschaft Dt. Luftfahrthistorik.
- Götter, Christian (2016). Die Macht der Wirkungsannahmen: Medienarbeit des britischen und deutschen Militärs in der ersten Hälfte des 20. Jahrhunderts [The Power of Assumptions: Media Work of the British and German Military in the First Half of the 20th Century] (in German). Erscheinungsort nicht ermittelbar: De Gruyter. p. 167. ISBN 9783110448245. OCLC 937040832.
- Groot, Sebastian J. de (2021). "Kapitel 2 Das Ingenieurskantoor voor Scheepsbouw (Ingenieurbüro für Schiffbau IvS) 1922-1940". Ein Wolf im Schafspelz: verdeckte deutsch-niederländische Rüstungsproduktion und die Firma IvS 1922-1945 [A Wolf in Sheep's Clothing: Covert German-Dutch Armaments Production and the Company IvS 1922-1945] (in German) (2nd Extended ed.). Paderborn Leiden Boston Singapore: Brill, Ferdinand Schöningh. pp. 19–60. ISBN 9783657704446.
- Hillman, Jörg (24 May 2013). "Slipping into the war: German Naval Strategy between 1920 and 1940". In Clemmesen, Micheal H.; Faulkner, Marcus S. (eds.). Northern European Overture to War, 1939-1941: From Memel to Barbarossa. Leiden: BRILL. ISBN 978-90-04-24909-7.
- Johnson, Ian Ona (2021). "Chapter 16 The Lohmann Scandal". Faustian Bargain: The Soviet-German Partnership and the Origins of the Second World War. New York: Oxford University Press. p. 102. ISBN 978-0-19-067514-1.
- Johnson, David Alan (2024). Admiral Canaris: How Hitler's Chief of Intelligence Betrayed the Nazis (1st ed.). Blue Ridge Summit: Globe Pequot Press, The. ISBN 9781633889996.
- Lavery, Jason (1999). "Finnish-German Submarine Cooperation 1923–35". Scandinavian Studies. 71 (4): 393–418. ISSN 0036-5637. JSTOR 40920169.
- MacKenzie, Donald (29 January 1993). Inventing Accuracy: A Historical Sociology of Nuclear Missile Guidance. London: MIT Press. ISBN 978-0-262-63147-1.
- Mueller, Michael (2017). Nazi Spymaster The Life and Death of Admiral Wilhelm Canaris. New York: Skyhorse Publishing. ISBN 9781510717770.
- Paterson, Lawrence (2015). Schnellboote: A Complete Operational History. Barnsley: Seaforth Publishing. ISBN 9781848320833.
- Presas I Puig, Albert (2010). "Technoscientific Synergies between Germany and Spain in the Twentieth: Century Continuity amid Radical Change". Technology and Culture. 51 (1): 80–98. doi:10.1353/tech.0.0420. ISSN 0040-165X. JSTOR 40646993.
- Petley, Julian (1979). Capital and culture: German cinema, 1933-45. London: Educational Advisory Service, British Film Institute. ISBN 9780851700885. OCLC 8053169.
- Preußen, Freistaat (1888). Statistisches Handbuch für den Preussischen Staat (in German). Vol. 1. Berlin: Verlag des Königlichen Statistischen Bureaus. p. 300.
- "The Lohmann Affair". Studies in Intelligence. 4 (2). CIA: A31–A38. 22 September 1993. Archived from the original on 9 January 2008.
- Rahn, Werner (1976). Reichsmarine und Landesverteidigung 1919-1928: Konzeption und Führung der Marine in der Weimarer Republik (in German). Bernard & Graefe. p. 223. ISBN 978-3-7637-5143-3.
- Remmele, Bernd (1 December 1997). "Die maritime Geheimrüstung unter Kapitän z.S. Lohmann" [The maritime secret armament under Captain z.S. Lohmann]. Militärgeschichtliche Zeitschrift. 56 (2): 313–376. doi:10.1524/mgzs.1997.56.2.313.
- Ruge, Vice Admiral Friedrich (February 1955). "German Naval Strategy Across Two Wars". United States Naval Institute Proceedings. 81 (2).
- Schneller, Ernest (1928). Phoebus-Skandal : Korruption und Geheimrüstungen (PDF) (in German). Berlin: Internationaler Arbeiter-Verlag. OCLC 831153357.
- Stoelzel, Albert (1930). Marine Offizier Verband (ed.). Ehrenrangliste der Kaiserlich Deutschen Marine, 1914-1918 (in German). Berlin: Thormann & Goetsch.
- Suhr, Heiko; Kuropka, Joachim (2020). Wilhelm Canaris: Lehrjahre eines Geheimdienstchefs (1905-1934) (1st ed.). Hamburg: Wachholtz. pp. 298–300. ISBN 978-3-529-09551-1.
- Thompson, Adam (2 June 2018). Kustenflieger: The Operational History of the German Naval Air Service 1935-1944. Fonthill Media. ISBN 9781781552834.
- Trials of War Criminals Before the Nuernberg Military Tribunals Under Control Council Law No. 10, Nuremberg, October 1946-April, 1949: Case 12: U.S. v. von Leeb (High Command case). Vol. X. Washington: U.S. Government Printing Office. April 1949.
- Vitores, Mikel Martínez (2016). "Horacio Echevarrieta Maruri. El magnate del Palacio Munoa" [Horacio Echevarrieta Maruri. The magnate of the Munoa Palace]. K-Barakaldo. 2. Barakaldo: El Centro de Interpretación Histórica y Medioambiental de Barakaldo: 78–100.
- Walker, Fred M (5 May 2010). Ships and Shipbuilders: Pioneers of Design and Construction. Seaforth Publishing. pp. 220–. ISBN 978-1-84832-072-7.
- "Iberia celebra mañana 80 años de andadura con una flota de 220 aviones y vuelos a 104 destinos" (in European Spanish). Europa Press. 27 June 2007.
