= Lohmann Affair =

Weimar Republic political scandal concerning a secret rearmament program

The Lohmann Affair (Lohmann-Affäre) or Phoebus Affair was a scandal in the affairs of the German Weimar Republic in 1927, where a secret rearmament programme was uncovered during bankruptcy proceedings of the Phoebus Film AG production company. In addition to the dismissal of both Vice Admiral Walter Lohmann on 19 January 1928 and Reichsmarine Chief Hans Zenker on 30 September 1928, it led Reichswehr Minister Otto Gessler to resign.

== Secret rearmament ==
In early 1923, Captain Walter Lohmann, who had acquired international business experience, gained command (Chef der Seetransportabteilung der Reichsmarine) of the Navy's Maritime Transport Department on 28 October 1920, whose primary responsibility was logistical matters. With full confidence and trust of naval Chief Admiral Paul Behncke, Lohmann was transferred to managing naval "black funds" generally used for covert funding. Initially, proceeds of about 100 million Goldmark were garnered from the illegal sale of ships and submarines intended for scrapping in 1919 and 1920 under Treaty of Versailles requirements. In addition, "Ruhr Funds" submitted by the Cabinet without Parliament knowledge were added to the fund, of which a portion, 12 million German gold marks, were intended to prepare the marines for military resistance in the Occupation of the Ruhr crisis. Defense Minister Otto Gessler wrote in his memoirs:

Lohmann was to ensure primarily and in all circumstances secrecy. He had to stand straight in the event of a breakdown [in getting it done] (German: Getane), that is, to take everything on his own cap as a pure privation. He received the assurance of personal honor protection.

— Otto Gessler, Reichswehr politics in the Weimar period, p. 446

Ruhr fund monies were used mainly for secret weapons sales, especially in Italy, and to build a tanker fleet. Activities, however, went far beyond that, including:

- Establishing a marine intelligence service (German: Marinenachrichtendienst), initially to ensure the supply of raw materials.
- Developing a modern submarine (among other things with a bubble-free torpedo, see also German Type II submarine) with the help of secret funds of the Friedrich Krupp Ship Yard in Kiel, the AG Weser in Bremen, the Vulcan Shipyard (German: Vulkanwerft) in Hamburg and Stettin (now Szczecin), and by the Engineers Office for Shipbuilding (Dutch: Ingenieurskantoor voor Scheepsbouw) in The Hague, Netherlands, which was built on the basis of Wilhelm Canaris's mediation from 1926 in Cádiz, Spain.
- Supporting the Heinkel, Dornier Flugzeugwerke and Rohrbach Metall-Flugzeugbau companies in building aeroplanes.
- Purchasing the Caspar Works, which developed "civilian" aircraft whose performance data "coincidentally" resembled those of other countries' military aircraft.
- SEVERA (SEeflug-VERsuchsAnstalt), (seaplane pilot division) to develop aircraft required for Navy pilot training in Norderney and Kiel-Holtenau.
- Travemünde Marina A.G. to develop and maintain speedboats.
- Participating in founding the Neustädter Slip-GmbH as a repair and training company for sport and speed boats.
- Establishing the German High Seasport Association HANSA to promote officers' children for secret reconstruction of the Reichsmarine.
- Making available the well-equipped yachting school in Neustadt in Holstein to the German High Seasport Association HANSA (today DHH).

== Economic activities ==
In addition, Lohmann began investing in commercial projects:

- Property speculation
- Purchasing Berlin Bacon AG, through which he wanted to disrupt the British bacon market to the Danes.
- Purchasing a private-bank-shares bank, Berliner Bankverein, the bank through which Lohmann financed all activities.
- Developing an ice rescue process
- Participating in and guarantees for Phoebus Film AG (see below)

Various explanations were given for these non-maritime activities:

- They should be indirectly in the navy's interests, e.g., Berlin Bacon AG's refrigerated vessels could also have been used to carry troops during the war
- They should serve to unobtrusively build an agent network
- They should conceal secret project financing
- They should replace the lack of funds inflow through their economic success

Lohmann, on the other hand, received explanations of honour from all sides, that he had not personally enriched himself. But he was also told that he had been a friend of the Phoebus director Ernst Hugo Correll and had given his girlfriend Else Ektimov, a 12-room apartment and a well-paid job at Phoebus.

From 1924, Lohmann invested heavily in Phoebus-Film AG, which had released its first film The Fire Ship (Das Feuerschiff) in 1922 and by 1927 it was the third largest film production company in Germany. In addition to returns, he also expected to be able to place agents inconspicuously in Phoebus' foreign offices. When Phoebus ran into financial problems, Lohmann obtained credit for it from the Girozentrale. He received the signature for the required guarantee only on presenting a further guarantee from the parent company, Lignose AG, which had priority. Lignose processed nitrates to produce raw celluloid film, along with guncotton and other explosives. Lignose had a subsidiary sound film company, Lignose Hörfilm System Breusing (Lignose Sound Film, System Breusing) with studios at 32-34 Lindenstraße, Berlin in 1928–1933. On the other hand, Lohmann assured Lignose that in the name of the republic it was not liable for this guarantee. Later, he signed his own financial guarantees.

In August, when bankruptcy could no longer be averted at Phoebus-Film, the financing arrangement collapsed.

== Exposé ==
Kurt Wenkel, an economic's journalist of the Berlin daily newspaper Berliner Tageblatt, had for some time wondered how the company could delay its collapse for so long and by mid-July 1927 began to believe that it was receiving external support. After a former Phoebus employee informed him about the Lohmann investments, Wenkel published the details on 8,9 August, that resulted in an uproar, then became a scandal. He was likely unaware of the real background to the story, but suspected that the state "in the national sense" must have influenced the programme.

The government under Reichskanzler Wilhelm Marx tried to limit the damage. The Wenkel articles were removed from publication under threat of prosecution for treason. The remote economic activities were portrayed as the work of a subordinate official, and the Phoebus scandal became the Lohmann affair. The secret rearmament activities, and thus the breach of the Treaty of Versailles, could be hushed up. Although the Reichstag's Kommunistische Partei Deutschlands (KPD) Deputy Ernst Schneller asked very precisely for details of the upgrade programme, he was ignored.

The Reichstag approved 26 million RM to settle the affair only after resignation of Reichswehrminister Otto Gessler on 19 January 19, 1928. On 30 September, Gessler's successor Wilhelm Groener, dismissed the chief of the Reichsmarine, Admiral Hans Zenker, Lohmann's direct superintendent. Lohmann himself was retired and his pension cut, but he was never prosecuted, because to uncover the affair's true background would have been too great a risk. Completely impoverished, Lohmann died three years later of a heart attack.

The secret rearmament was not halted but rather extended, subject to the Court of Auditors' independent and secret control. The naval intelligence service was merged into the Army defense command in 1928. Severa was taken over by Lufthansa to be used for coastal flights, although it already had a sea-flight department.

== Other revelations ==
When funds to build an officer school in Friedrichsort, near Kiel, were applied for in the republic's supplementary budget of 1926, the parliamentary deputy, during Parliamentary debate, came to the conclusion that the school had been built already and had been inaugurated by Admiral Hans Zenker, Chief of the Naval Command. The Social Democratic Party of Germany (SPD) suspected black funds and demanded that army and navy resources should be limited to their allotted budgets and be monitored more closely.

In 1929, an article "Windiges aus der deutschen Luftfahrt" ('Stormy Matters from German Aviation') appeared in the magazine Die Weltbühne ("The World Stage") by Heinz Jäger about the German aviation industry, which revealed individual details of the continued secret armoury. Both the author Walter Kreiser (pseudonym: Heinz Jäger) and the publisher Carl von Ossietzky were condemned to 18 months imprisonment for exposing military secrets.

== Bibliography ==
- Buchheit, Gert (1 January 1966). Der deutsche Geheimdienst. Geschichte der militärischen Abwehr (in German). Munich: Paul List.
- Carsten, F. L. (1964). The Reichswehr and politics : 1918 to 1933. Köln: Clarendon Press.
- Laser, Kurt (July 2000). "Der Film im Berlin der zwanziger und dreißiger Jahre". Berlinische Monatsschrift (in German). 6 (9). Berlin. Archived from the original on 27 June 2024.
- Caspar, Gustav Adolf (1959). "Die sozialdemokratische Partei und das deutsche Wehrproblem in den Jahren der Weimarer Republik". Wehrwissenschaftliche Rundschau. 11. Stuttgart: Arbeitskreis für Wehrforschung.
- Gessler, Otto (1958). Sendtner, Kurt (ed.). Reichswehrpolitik in der Weimarer Zeit. Stuttgart: Deutsche Verlags-Anstalt. OCLC 847723.
- Grossmann, Kurt R. (1973). Ossietzky, ein deutscher Patriot Ossietzky, ein deutscher Patriot (in German). Vol. 83 (1st ed.). Suhrkamp. p. 195. ISBN 9783518065839. ISSN 0930-9721.
- Murray, Williamson R.; Millett, Allan R. (13 August 1998). Military Innovation in the Interwar Period. Cambridge University Press. ISBN 978-0-521-63760-2. OCLC 852896224.
- Jäger, Heinz (1929). "Windiges aus der Deutschen Luftfahrt" (PDF). Die Weltbühne. XXV (11): 402–407. Archived from the original (PDF) on 27 December 2023.
- Remmele, Bernd (1 December 1997). "Die maritime Geheimrüstung unter Kapitän z.S. Lohmann". Militärgeschichtliche Zeitschrift. 56 (2): 313–376. doi:10.1524/mgzs.1997.56.2.313.
- Schneller, Ernest (1 April 1928). "Phoebus-Skandal:Korruption und Geheimrüstungen" (PDF). The International. 11 (7). Internationaler Arbeiter-Verlag: 193. OCLC 831153357.
- "The Lohmann Affair". Studies in Intelligence. 4 (2). CIA: A31–A38. 22 September 1993. Archived from the original on 9 January 2008.
- "Phoebus-Film AG (Berlin)". Film Portal De (in German). Frankfurt: Deutsches Filminstitut & Filmmuseum e.V.
