= Eduard von Capelle =

German admiral (1855–1931)

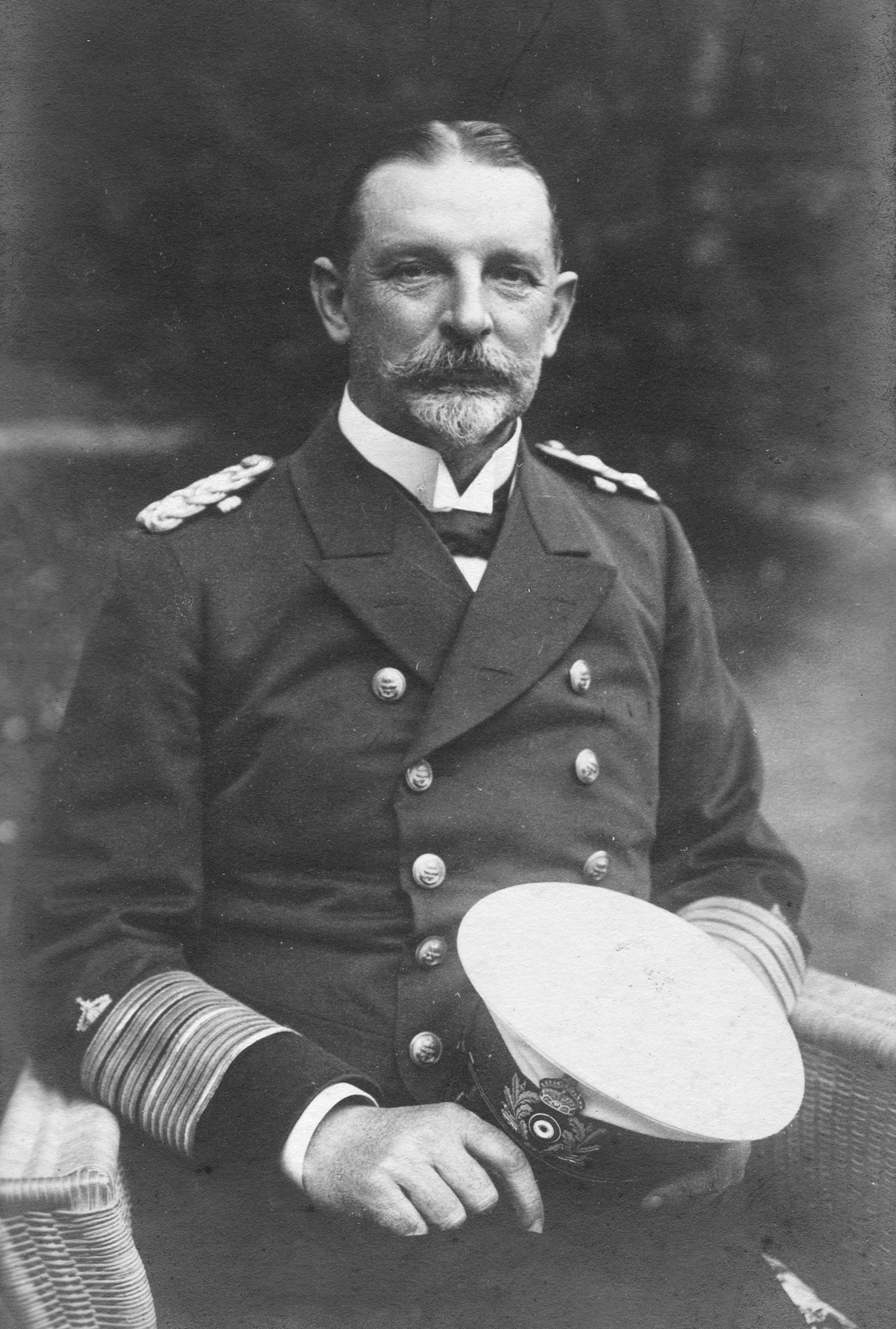
- Born: 10 October 1855; Celle, Lower Saxony, Kingdom of Hanover
- Died: 23 February 1931 (aged 75); Wiesbaden, Hesse, Germany
- Military career
- Allegiance: German Empire
- Branch: Imperial German Navy
- Service years: 1872–1918
- Rank: Admiral

State Secretary for the Navy of Germany
- In office 15 March 1916 – 6 October 1918
- Monarch: Wilhelm II
- Chancellor: Theobald von Bethmann Hollweg; Georg Michaelis; Georg von Hertling; Max von Baden
- Preceded by: Alfred von Tirpitz
- Succeeded by: Paul Behncke

Eduard von Capelle (10 October 1855 – 23 February 1931) was a German Imperial Navy officer from Celle. He joined the Imperial German Navy in 1872, serving in various roles, including as an executive officer of the battleship SMS Weissenburg and chief of the administrative department in the Reichsmarineamt (Imperial Naval Office). Working closely with Admiral Alfred von Tirpitz, he was primarily responsible for drafting the Flottengesetze (German Naval Laws), and was promoted to admiral in 1913. He was supportive of Germany's entry into war during July Crisis of 1914.

Capelle was recalled from his post in March 1916 to replace Tirpitz as the State Secretary of the Imperial Navy Office, and oversaw the German naval war during the latter three years of World War I. Initially against unrestricted submarine warfare, he was persuaded to support it; the continuation of this policy caused the United States to declare war on Germany. Nevertheless, he maintained his belief in the supremacy of battleships and argued against halting their construction. Facing opposition from those who saw him as too much of a conservative in naval affairs, he was asked by Kaiser Wilhelm II to resign, which he did in October 1918. He resided in Wiesbaden until his death on 23 February 1931.

== Early career ==
Eduard Capelle was born on 10 October 1855, in Celle, in what was then the Kingdom of Hanover. His father, Eduard (1832–1897), was a factory owner, and his mother was Emilie Kraus (1831–1903); the younger Eduard had a brother, Hans (1864–1948), a physicist who served as President of the German Naval Observatory. Capelle joined the Imperial German Navy in 1872, as a naval cadet. He served in various capacities in the fleet, including in the Torpedowesen (Torpedo Department) with Alfred von Tirpitz. In December 1894, he was serving as the executive officer of the battleship SMS Weissenburg. He was later assigned to the Reichsmarineamt (RMA), the Imperial Navy Office, as the chief of the administrative department. In this capacity, he began to work closely with now-Admiral von Tirpitz, who had been promoted to become the State Secretary for the Navy. Capelle was responsible for drafting the legislation that became the Flottengesetz, the Fleet Laws, and the supplementary laws in 1906, 1908, and 1912. During this period, he and other senior members of the naval command worked repeatedly to break monopolies in the shipbuilding industry, as a means to keep costs low and stable. The only firm that proved resistant to their efforts was Krupp, which held a near monopoly on armor plating and large-caliber guns, and proved to be too powerful for the RMA to effectively pressure.

Capelle was promoted to konteradmiral (rear admiral) in 1906, and to vizeadmiral (vice admiral) three years later. In 1912, Capelle was elevated to the nobility, which allowed him to add "von" to his name. He rose to the rank of admiral in 1913, and by 1914, he was Tirpitz's deputy. During the July Crisis that instigated World War I, Capelle was temporarily the acting state secretary, as Tirpitz was away at his summer home. In this capacity, he endorsed the "blank check" Kaiser Wilhelm II had extended to Austria-Hungary in the aftermath of the assassination of Archduke Franz Ferdinand by Serbian terrorists the previous month. With regard to the deepening crisis, Capelle stated that while "many swords will be rattled and much poisonous ink spilled, Europe will not tear itself to pieces over Serbia.

== World War I ==
By late August 1915, Capelle had fallen ill, and so requested retirement from the navy, though he agreed to remain in the post until 1 November. In March 1916 Capelle was recalled to service and replaced Tirpitz, whose views on the naval war had become unpopular, as the State Secretary for the Navy. Tirpitz had by this point pushed for unrestricted submarine warfare in order to break the deadlock on the Western Front; Chancellor Theobald von Bethmann Hollweg, fearing war with the United States, manoeuvred to have Tirpitz relieved of command. He meanwhile secured the support of Capelle and brought him out of retirement. Capelle's position as state secretary was decidedly weaker than under Tirpitz's tenure; this was in large part due to the course of the war and the discrediting of the surface fleet policy advocated at first by Tirpitz and then by Capelle. Admiral Paul Behncke, who would later serve as Capelle's deputy, stated that, "In the Navy, the position of the RMA has become purely administrative, it no longer plays a leading role." Though Capelle was initially opposed to unrestricted submarine warfare, a group of senior officers led by the commander of the High Seas Fleet, Admiral Reinhard Scheer, convinced Capelle to change his mind, who in turn worked to convince Wilhelm II to permit a return to unrestricted submarine warfare. By January 1917, Wilhelm II had consented, and Germany resumed the U-boat campaign against Britain on 1 February. The US Congress voted to declare war with Germany on 6 April 1917.

Even though he agreed to resume the U-boat campaign, Capelle did not believe that submarines had replaced the battleship as the decisive naval weapon, arguing in February 1917 that new battleship construction—that of the L 20e α design—should not be stopped. In order to keep costs down, Capelle announced that the Navy would not build any ships over 41,000 t (40,000 long tons; 45,000 short tons) displacement or with a draft in excess of 9.8 m (32 ft); these were the maximum dimensions of the existing harbours and dry docks. Larger designs would require prohibitively expensive dredging on harbours and channels and new docks. Nevertheless, by February 1918, design work on the new class of battleships had ground to a halt, and Capelle could do nothing about it; by this far into the war, the U-boat arm had absorbed all of the limited production capabilities of the Navy. Capelle also advocated for shipbuilding contracts with the Ottoman Empire, Germany's wartime ally; he secured contracts for twelve torpedo boats and twelve U-boats for the Ottoman Navy. Capelle also used the naval construction program to keep skilled workers out of the Army, in order to preserve their expertise for the Navy's needs.

In August 1917, Capelle banned socialist literature from the fleet, in the aftermath of several disturbances. On 9 October 1917, in a speech to the Reichstag, he accused the radical, independent branch of the Sozialdemokratische Partei Deutschlands (SPD–Social Democratic Party) of knowingly supporting these revolutionary actions, which drove moderate SPD members closer to the radical independent faction. This led to the toppling of Chancellor Georg Michaelis, who was replaced by Georg von Hertling. On 9 January 1918, Capelle was awarded the Pour le Mérite, Germany's highest military award. By August 1918, Scheer and a group of prominent commanders in the High Seas Fleet had convinced Wilhelm II that the senior officers in the naval high command needed to be replaced by more dynamic individuals. To this end, Wilhelm II requested the resignation of Capelle, Henning von Holtzendorff, the Admiralty Chief, and Georg Alexander von Müller, the head of the Naval Cabinet. Capelle resigned from the Navy in October 1918, shortly before the end of the war. His deputy, Paul Behnke, briefly replaced him but was also forced out due to his opposition to Scheer, who had by this time been promoted to the Seekriegsleitung (Chief of Naval Staff).

In 1919, Capelle testified before the Reichstag War Failures Committee about his tenure as State Secretary during the war, particularly relating to the U-boat campaign against Britain. Capelle died in Wiesbaden on 23 February 1931.

== Decorations and awards ==
Kingdom of Prussia/German Empire

- Order of the Red Eagle, 1st class with Oak Leaves and Swords
- Order of the Crown, 1st class
- Pour le Mérite (9 January 1918)
- Knight's Cross of the Royal House Order of Hohenzollern
- Iron Cross of 1914, 1st and 2nd class
- Service Award

Other German states

- Kingdom of Bavaria: Military Merit Order, 1st class with Swords
- Bremen, Hamburg, and Lübeck: Hanseatic Cross
- Grand Duchy of Hesse: Commander Second Class of the Order of Philip
- Mecklenburg-Schwerin: Commander of the Order of the Griffon
- Oldenburg: Honorary Grand Cross of the House and Merit Order of Peter Frederick Louis
- Oldenburg: Friedrich August Cross, 1st class
- Kingdom of Saxony: Grand Cross of the Albert Order with golden star and swords
