= Hans Zenker =

German admiral (1870–1932)

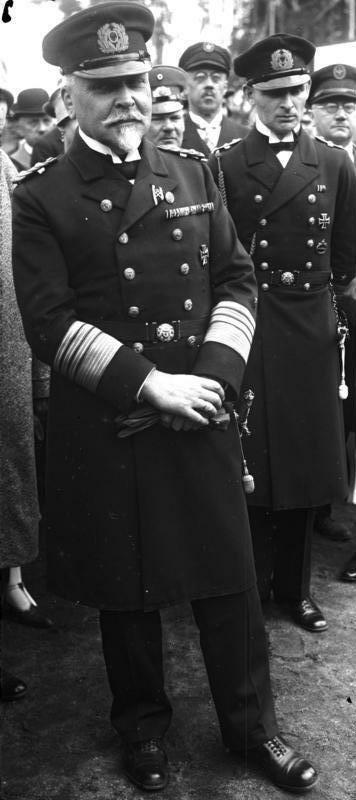
- Admiral Hans Zenker, circa 1928
- Born: 10 August 1870; Bielitz
- Died: 18 August 1932 (aged 62); Göttingen
- Relatives: Karl-Adolf Zenker (son)
- Military career
- Allegiance: German Empire; Weimar Republic
- Branch: Imperial German Navy; Reichsmarine
- Service years: 1889-1928
- Rank: Admiral
- Commands: SMS Von der Tann
- Conflicts: World War I; Battle of Jutland

Hans Zenker (10 August 1870 in Bielitz – 18 August 1932 in Göttingen) was a German admiral.

== Biography ==
Born in Bielitz (now Bielsko-Biała, Poland), he entered the Imperial German Navy on 13 April 1889. After serving as captain of several torpedo boats, he commanded in turn the light cruisers Lübeck in 1911 and Cöln in 1912–13. As captain of the battlecruiser Von der Tann in 1916–17, Zenker saw action in the Battle of Jutland on 31 May – 1 June 1916.

Zenker joined the Admiralty Staff in 1917. He was appointed to the North Sea area command in 1918, holding this post when the German war effort collapsed in November 1918.

After the war, he was an officer of the Reichsmarine, serving as Inspekteur der Marineartillerie from 1920 to 1923 and the top post of Chef der Marineleitung (Chief of the Naval Command) from October 1, 1924, to September 30, 1928. His tenure as head of the Reichsmarine saw the beginning of the rebuilding of the German fleet with the construction of light cruisers and torpedo boats and the planning of Deutschland class ships, later built as the Deutschland, Admiral Scheer, and Admiral Graf Spee.

== Family ==
The last years of his life Zenker spent in Osterode am Harz. His son, Karl-Adolf Zenker (1907-1998), held the office equivalent to Chef der Marineleitung—Inspector of the Navy—in the West German Bundesmarine from 1961 to 1967.

== See also ==
- Lohmann affair

Military offices
Preceded by Admiral Paul Behncke	Chef der Marineleitung; 1924–1928	Succeeded by Admiral Erich Raeder
