= Ernst Hugo Correll =

German film producer (1882–1942)

- Born: 9 June 1882; Neubreisach, Alsace, German Empire
- Died: 13 September 1942 (aged 60); Garmisch-Partenkirchen, Bavaria, Germany
- Occupation: Producer
- Years active: 1919–1939

Ernst Hugo Correll (9 June 1882 – 13 September 1942) was a German film producer active during the Weimar and early Nazi eras.

Born in Alsace, recently incorporated into the German Empire, he worked as a lawyer before service in the First World War. He fought on the Western Front and was awarded the Iron Cross. Postwar he founded a Berlin-based film production company with the Italian-born actor Luciano Albertini, which was subsequently taken over by the larger Phoebus Film. Correll became head of production at Phoebus, building it into one of the more successful companies of the era, until 1927 when he had to resign following the Lohmann Affair.

The following year he was appointed to a similar role at UFA, the largest German studio of the era. The former production chief Erich Pommer worked under him as a leading producer until 1933. Other heads of production units included Bruno Duday and Gunther Stapenhorst. When Pommer and other Jewish filmmakers left Germany following the Nazi Party's takeover, Correll remained at UFA. Although he had incurred the dislike of the new Minister of Propaganda Joseph Goebbels, he was protected for a number of years by Ludwig Klitsch. However, in 1939 he was dismissed because he refused to join the Nazi Party. He retired and died three years later in southern Bavaria. The stone cross on his grave has been sculpted by Otto Hitzberger, an artist classified as degenerate art by the Nazi regime.

== In popular culture ==
In 2016, Correll was played by David Novotný in The Devil's Mistress (Lída Baarová) by Filip Renč, a dramatization of Lida Baarová's life, a mistress of Joseph Goebbels.

== Bibliography ==
- Hardt, Ursula. From Caligari to California: Erich Pommer's life in the International Film Wars. Berghahn Books, 1996.
- Kester, Bernadette. Film Front Weimar: Representations of the First World War in German films of the Weimar Period (1919-1933). Amsterdam University Press, 2003.
- Kreimeier, Klaus. The Ufa Story: A History of Germany's Greatest Film Company, 1918-1945. University of California Press, 1999.
