= Phoebus Film =

German film company

Phoebus Film or Phoebus-Film was a German film production and distribution company active during the silent era. It was one of the medium-sized firms established during the early boom years of the Weimar Republic. It had a distribution agreement with the American studio MGM.

In 1927 the studio became involved in major controversy during the Lohmann Affair, when it emerged that the company had secretly been granted a large sum from the German Navy Department geared toward military propaganda and support of rearmament at a time when this was forbidden by the Treaty of Versailles. The ensuing scandal led to a political crisis in the Weimar Republic and the resignation of Otto Gessler as Defence Minister.

The company went bankrupt in the wake of the scandal. In 1928 the Munich-based Bavaria Film bought up the remaining assets of the company Its former production chief Ernst Hugo Correll was appointed as the new head of Germany's largest company UFA.

== Bibliography ==
- Hardt, Ursula. From Caligari to California: Erich Pommer's life in the International Film Wars. Berghahn Books, 1996.
- Kreimeier, Klaus. The Ufa Story: A History of Germany's Greatest Film Company, 1918-1945. University of California Press, 1999.
- Petley, Julian. Capital and Culture: German Cinema, 1933–45. British Film Institute, 1979.
