= Friedrich Saemisch =

German lawyer, administrative official and politician

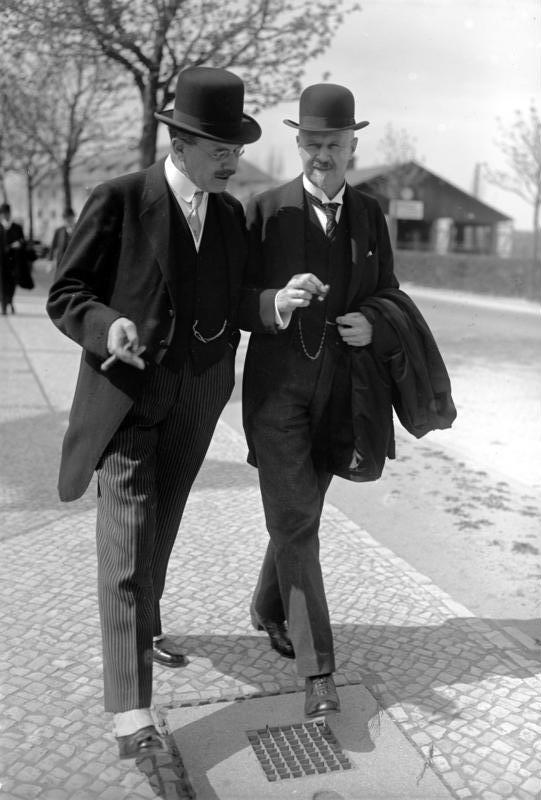
- Friedrich Ernst Moritz Saemisch (right), 1930

Prussian Minister of Finance
- In office 1921–1921
- Preceded by: Hermann Lüdemann
- Succeeded by: Ernst von Richter

Personal details
- Born: 23 December 1869 Bonn
- Died: 23 October 1945 (aged 75) Freiburg im Breisgau
- Spouse(s): Linda von Nasse; Alexandra von Ranke
- Children: Ernst Ranke (grandfather)
- Parent(s): Theodor Saemisch; Linda Ranke

Friedrich Ernst Moritz Saemisch (December 23, 1869 - October 23, 1945) was a German lawyer, administrative official and politician in the Weimar Republic and during the Nazi era.

== Early life ==
Saemisch was born December 23, 1869, in Bonn. He was a son of Dr. Theodor Saemisch (1833–1909), a doctor of medicine and professor of ophthalmology in Berlin, and Sieglinde "Linda" Ranke (1848–1891), the daughter of Ernst Ranke, professor of theology in Marburg.

After graduating from high school, Saemisch studied law and philosophy in Bonn, Munich, Berlin and Marburg.

== Career ==
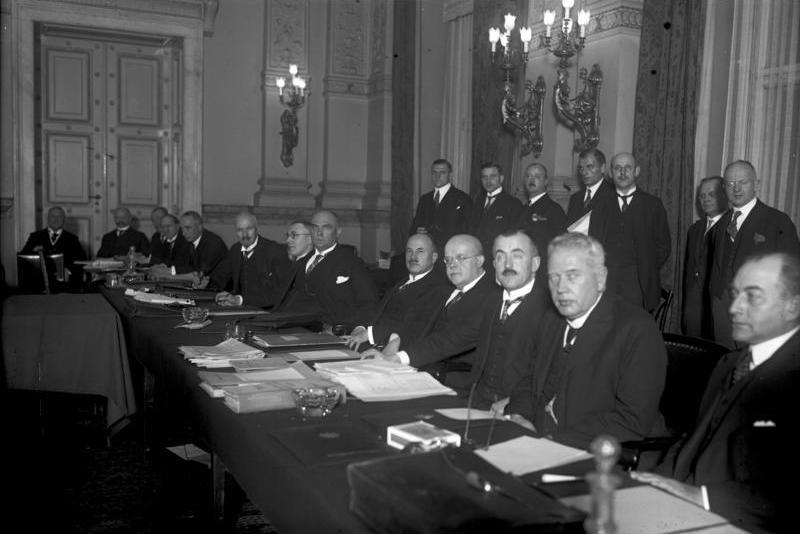
From right to left: A group of Reich ministers, including former Minister of State Sämisch, January 1928.

He entered the Prussian judicial service as a trainee lawyer in 1894, worked in administrative service since 1897 and moved to the Reich Treasury as a civil servant in 1916. In 1918 he was promoted to Privy Government Councilor and Lecturer Councilor.

In 1919, Saemisch was appointed president of the state tax office of the province of Hesse-Nassau. From April 21, 1921, to November 7, 1921, Saemisch served as Prussian Finance Minister in the state government led by Prime Minister Adam Stegerwald. From 1922 to 1938, Saemisch was President of the Court of Audit of the German Reich and Chief President of the Prussian Higher Audit Chamber. At the same time, he served as Reich Savings Commissioner and in 1930 became Notes Commissioner at the Reichsbank.

== Personal life ==
Saemisch was married twice. His first wife was Linda von Nasse (1868–1917), a daughter of Berthold von Nasse, President of the Rhine Provinces, and Henriette Weber. Before her death, they were the parents of one son:

- Hans Paul Berthold Ernst Saemisch (1902–1984), a journalist and expressionist painter, lived in Finland from 1942 to 1945, and in Mexico since 1964; he married Johanna in 1925. After her death in 1959, he married Gertrudis Zenzes in 1963.

In 1924, he married Alexandra von Ranke (1891–1976), a daughter of the Prussian Major General Friedhelm von Ranke and Selma "Lily" von Ranke. They were the parents of a son:

- Theodore Saemisch (b. 1931)

Saemisch died on October 23, 1945, in Freiburg im Breisgau.
