= Paul Behncke =

German admiral (1869–1937)

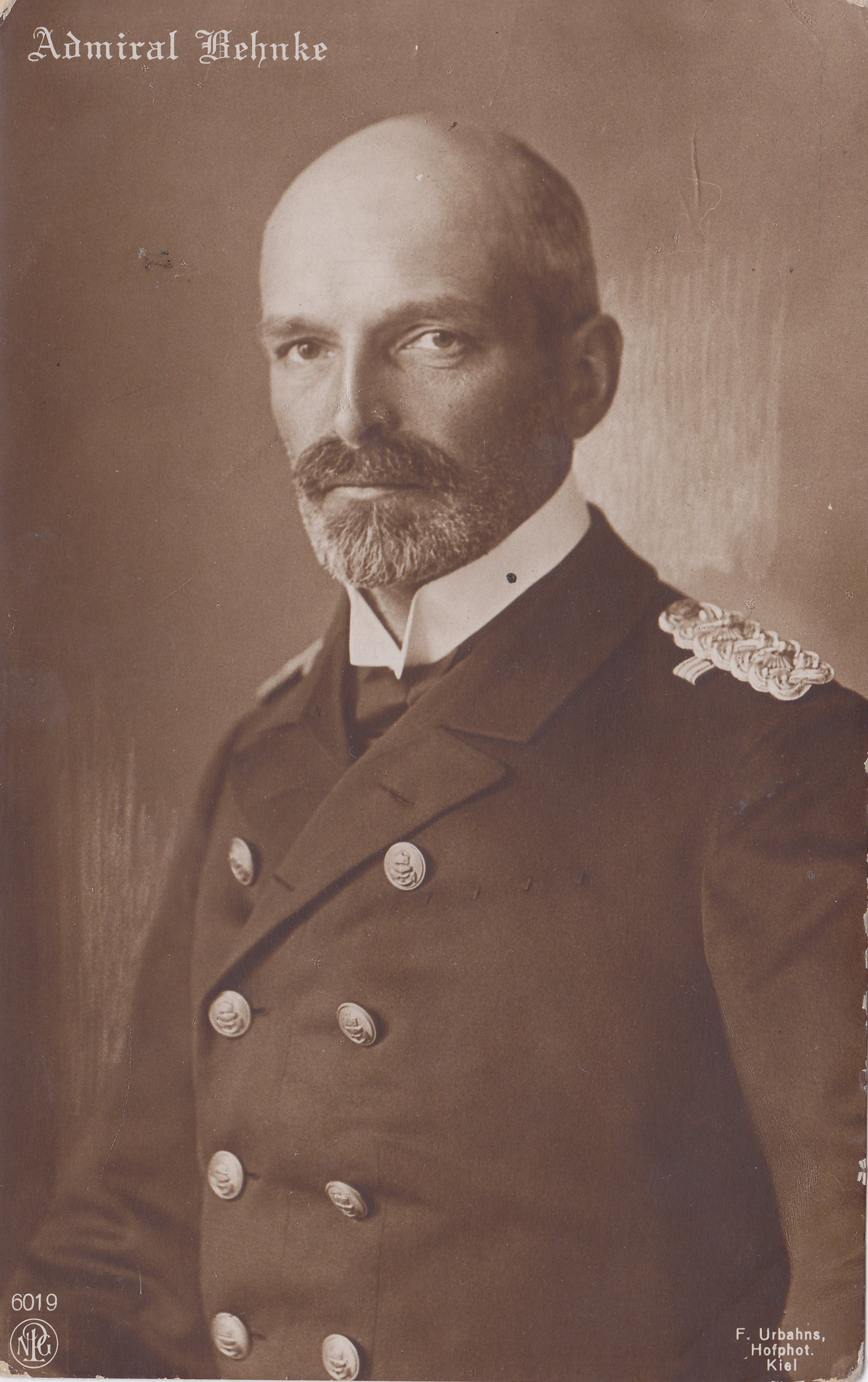
- Born: 13 August 1869; Lübeck, North German Confederation
- Died: 4 January 1937 (aged 67); Berlin, Nazi Germany
- Military career
- Allegiance: German Empire; Weimar Republic
- Branch: Imperial German Navy; Reichsmarine
- Service years: 1883–1924
- Rank: Admiral
- Commands: III Battle Squadron
- Conflicts: World War I: Battle of Jutland; Battle of Moon Sound
- Awards: Pour le Mérite

State Secretary for the Navy of Germany
- In office 6 October – 9 November 1918
- Monarch: Wilhelm II
- Chancellor: Max von Baden
- Preceded by: Eduard von Capelle
- Succeeded by: Ernst Ritter von Mann Edler von Tiechler

Chief of the Admiralty of Germany
- In office 1 September – 14 September 1920
- Reichspräsident: Friedrich Ebert
- Chancellor: Constantin Fehrenbach
- Reichminister of the Reichswehr: Otto Gessler
- Preceded by: William Michaelis
- Succeeded by: Himself (as Chief of the Naval Command)

Chief of the Naval Command of Germany
- In office 14 September 1920 – 1 October 1924
- Reichspräsident: Friedrich Ebert
- Chancellor: Constantin Fehrenbach; Joseph Wirth; Wilhelm Cuno; Gustav Stresemann; Wilhelm Marx
- Reichminister of the Reichswehr: Otto Gessler
- Preceded by: Himself (as Chief of the Admiralty)
- Succeeded by: Hans Zenker

Paul Behncke (13 August 1869 – 4 January 1937) was born in Lübeck and died in Berlin. He was a German admiral during the First World War, most notable for his command of the III Battle Squadron of the German High Seas Fleet during the Battle of Jutland.

== Naval career ==
At the age of fourteen he joined the navy and as an officer commanded a gunboat in the Far East. After studying at the Naval Academy in Kiel he was assigned to the general staff. As commander of the unprotected cruiser SMS Falke, he returned to Chinese waters and on being promoted to the rank of captain he was appointed to the battleship SMS Wettin, and afterwards to the dreadnought SMS Westfalen.

Shortly before the outbreak of the First World War Behncke was promoted to Konteradmiral (Rear Admiral) and again assigned to the general staff. During the conflict he was opposed to Admiral Alfred von Tirpitz's theories on submarine warfare, and was appointed head of the III Battle Squadron, composed of eight of the nine most modern battleships of the German navy (the König and Kaiser classes). Leading these ships aboard his flagship SMS König, Behncke took part in the Battle of Jutland, where he was seriously wounded by a shell splinter and found himself in command of the whole fleet during the third phase of the action.

Behncke also lobbied for the navy's fleet of Zeppelin airships to be used to bomb targets in Britain. In a memorandum of 20 August 1914, he proposed bombing attacks on London "to cause panic in the population which may possibly render it doubtful that the war can be continued". After receiving the backing of Peter Strasser, chief of the naval airship division, and finally von Tirpitz himslf, the plan for a bombing campaign against Britain was approved by the Kaiser on 7 January 1915.

During the 1917 Battle of Moon Sound he prevented the retreat of part of the Russian fleet and sank the Slava. By that time he had the rank of Vizeadmiral (Vice Admiral) and the following year, after the renunciation of Admiral Eduard von Capelle, rose to State Secretary of the Imperial Naval Office, a position he held for only one month before being relieved.

Behncke regained office after the war, replacing admiral Adolf von Trotha, and retired from the navy in 1924. In retirement, Behncke served as the president of the German-Japanese Society.

Military offices
New creation	Chef der Marineleitung; 15 September 1920 – 25 September 1924	Succeeded by Vizeadmiral Hans Zenker
Preceded by Konteradmiral William Michaelis	Chef der Admiralität; 1 – 14 September 1920	Office renamed
Preceded by Admiral Eduard von Capelle	Staatssekretär im Reichsmarineamt; 18 – 27 September 1918 (Acting since August 28th)	Succeeded by Vizeadmiral Ernst Karl August Klemens von Mann
Preceded by Admiral Reinhard Scheer	Chef des III. Geschwaders; 24 January – 11 August 1918	Succeeded by Vizeadmiral Hugo Kraft
New creation	Deputy Chief of the Admiralty Staff; 2 August 1914 – 4 September 1915	Succeeded by Vizeadmiral Reinhard Koch
Preceded by Kapitän zur See Friedrich Gädeke	Commanding officer of SMS Westfalen; 15 September 1910 – 30 September 1911	Succeeded by Kapitän zur See Wilhelm Starke
Preceded by Kapitän zur See Wilhelm Souchon	Commanding officer of SMS Wettin; 19 September 1909 – 14 September 1910	Succeeded by Kapitän zur See Hermann Nordmann
Preceded by Korvettenkapitän Friedrich Musculus	Commanding officer of SMS Falke; 30 October 1903 – 3 November 1905	Succeeded by Korvettenkapitän Georg von Ammon
