= Looff =

Looff is a surname. Notable people with the surname include:

- Charles I. D. Looff (1852–1918), Danish carver and amusement park ride builder
- Max Looff (1874–1954), German naval commander and military writer

== See also ==
- Looff Hippodrome (disambiguation), carousel
