= China Medal (German Empire) =

German Empire campaign medal

China Commemorative Medal (German:China-Denkmünze)
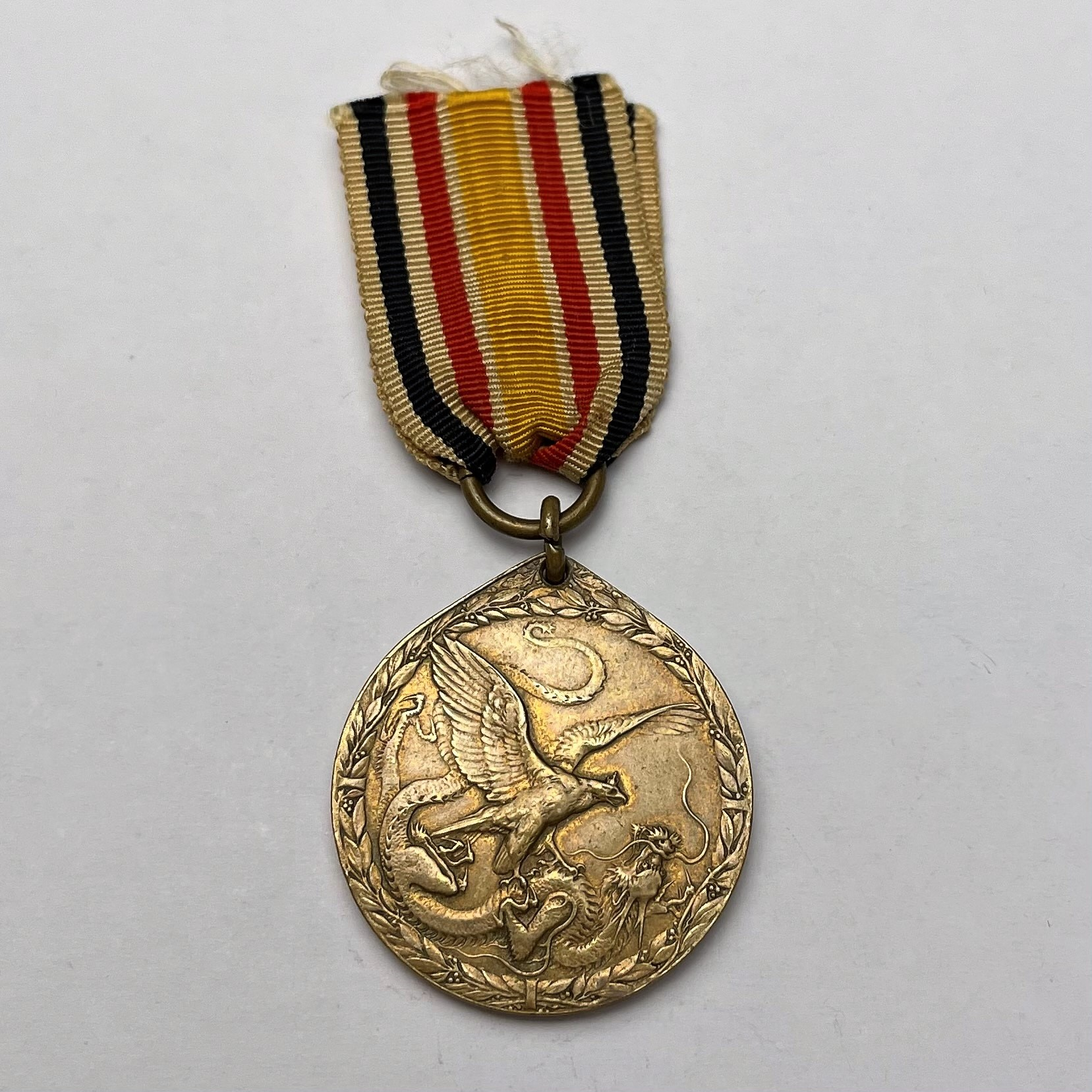
- Obverse view, bronze medal
- Type: Campaign medal
- Awarded for: Active participation or contribution to the war effort
- Description: Bronze for combatants; Steel for non-combatants
- Presented by: German Empire
- Eligibility: German military and civilians
- Campaign: Boxer Rebellion
- Clasps: 14
- Status: No longer awarded
- Established: 10 May 1901
- First award: 1901

Highlights
- Total recipients: c. 45,000
- Ribbon bar of the medal
- Related: Colonial Medal; South West Africa Commemorative Medal

The China Medal, officially the China Commemorative Medal (German:China-Denkmünze), was a medal of the German Empire. It was instituted on 10 May 1901 by Kaiser Wilhelm II, in his capacity as German Emperor. It was issued to German participants in the Chinese Boxer Rebellion of 1900–1901, in recognition of their contributions to the war effort both in the combat zone and on the home front.

== Eligibility ==
The medal could be awarded to all combatants who participated in the military operations in China between 30 May 1900 and 29 June 1901, as well as to persons who were active in the care of the sick and wounded in the war zone. Recipients included officers and soldiers, naval personnel, medical officers and German officials who participated in the hostilities in China or were stationed there when the fighting began. Also eligible were volunteer medical personnel present on the battlefield or in field hospitals and hospital ships, members of the German guard detachments in Peking and Tientsin (today, Beijing and Tianjin), and non-Chinese individuals who were staying at the German legations during this period. The total number of combatant awards has been estimated at about 40,000.

In addition, a non-combatant version could be awarded to all persons who were involved in the preparations for the mobilization and deployment of the German armed forces, as well as to the crews of German shipping company vessels transporting troops and war materiel to and from China. Eligibility also extended to shipping line officials supervising the transports, participating personnel of the Hamburg-America Line and officials of the Reichspost (imperial postal service). The total number of non-combatant awards is estimated to have exceeded 5,000.

== Description ==
- The design for the medal originated with Wilhelm II himself and was executed by the noted sculptor and art professor Walter Schott. The medals were produced by the metalware company of Mayer & Wilhelm in Stuttgart.
- The medal was a nearly round 32 mm wide disc that tapered to a point at the top featuring a hole, through which passed a small, elongated ring that attached to a larger round suspension ring. For combatants, the medal was made of bronze; for non-combatants, it was made of steel.
- The obverse depicted the image of a crowned eagle flying to the right, holding a large dragon in its talons. Around the edge ran a narrow, dense laurel garland.
- The reverse featured at its center the imperial monogram W in Gothic script beneath an image of the German State Crown with a fluttering ribbon on each side. Around this ran an inscription, bordered by a narrow, dense laurel garland as on the obverse. For the bronze combatant medal, it read: DEN SIEGREICHEN STREITERN (To the Victorious Warriors) and at the bottom, 1900 CHINA 1901. For the steel non-combatant medal, it read: VIERDIENST UM DIE EXPEDITION NACH CHINA (Service to the expedition to China) with a small five-pointed star at the bottom.

== Ribbon and placement ==
The medal was worn on the left breast, suspended from a 35-mm-wide ribbon with a 9-mm-wide orange-yellow center, flanked on each side by a 2-mm-wide white stripe, a 3-mm-wide red stripe, a 3-mm-wide white stripe, a 3 mm-wide-black stripe and a 2-mm-wide white border stripe.

== Medal bars ==
For combatants, any of 14 official medal bars could be awarded with the medal, providing the name(s) of the engagement(s) in which they had participated. For recipients who had taken part in multiple engagements, the bars were affixed one below the other in chronological order. The bars were made of gilt brass and were attached to the ribbon by means of pins on the back. They measured 7 mm in height and 33 mm in width, were bordered by a narrow, raised, polished edge, and bore the inscriptions in raised letters against a stippled background. The bars had to be purchased at the expense of the recipient. The bars were authorized in September 1901, and the list of battles was last expanded in December 1902. The names are as follows:

- Taku
- Seymour-Expedition
- Tientsin
- Peking
- Peitang-Forts
- Liang-Hsiang-Hsien
- Kaumi
- Tsekingkwan
- Kalgan
- Huolu
- Kitchou
- Hophu
- Fouphing
- Nan-Hung-Men

== Selected recipients ==
- Prince Arnulf of Bavaria
- Jakob Ritter von Danner
- Theodor Duesterberg
- Franz Ritter von Epp
- Hermann von François
- Walter Gladisch
- Wilhelm Ritter von Leeb
- Max Looff
- Hugo Meurer
- Erich Raeder
- Friedrich Sixt von Armin

== Sources ==
- "China-Denkmünze" (in German). Archived from the original on 30 January 2013.
- China-Denkmünze für Kämpfer 1901 in the Ehrenzeichen-Orden website
- China-Denkmünze für Nichtkämpfer 1901 in the Ehrenzeichen-Orden website
- Hessenthal, Waldemar von; Schreiber, Georg (2001). Honours and Awards of the German States. Naval & Military Press. ISBN 978-1-843-42144-3.
