= South West Africa Commemorative Medal =

German Empire campaign medal

South West Africa Commemorative Medal (German: Südwestafrika Denkmünze)
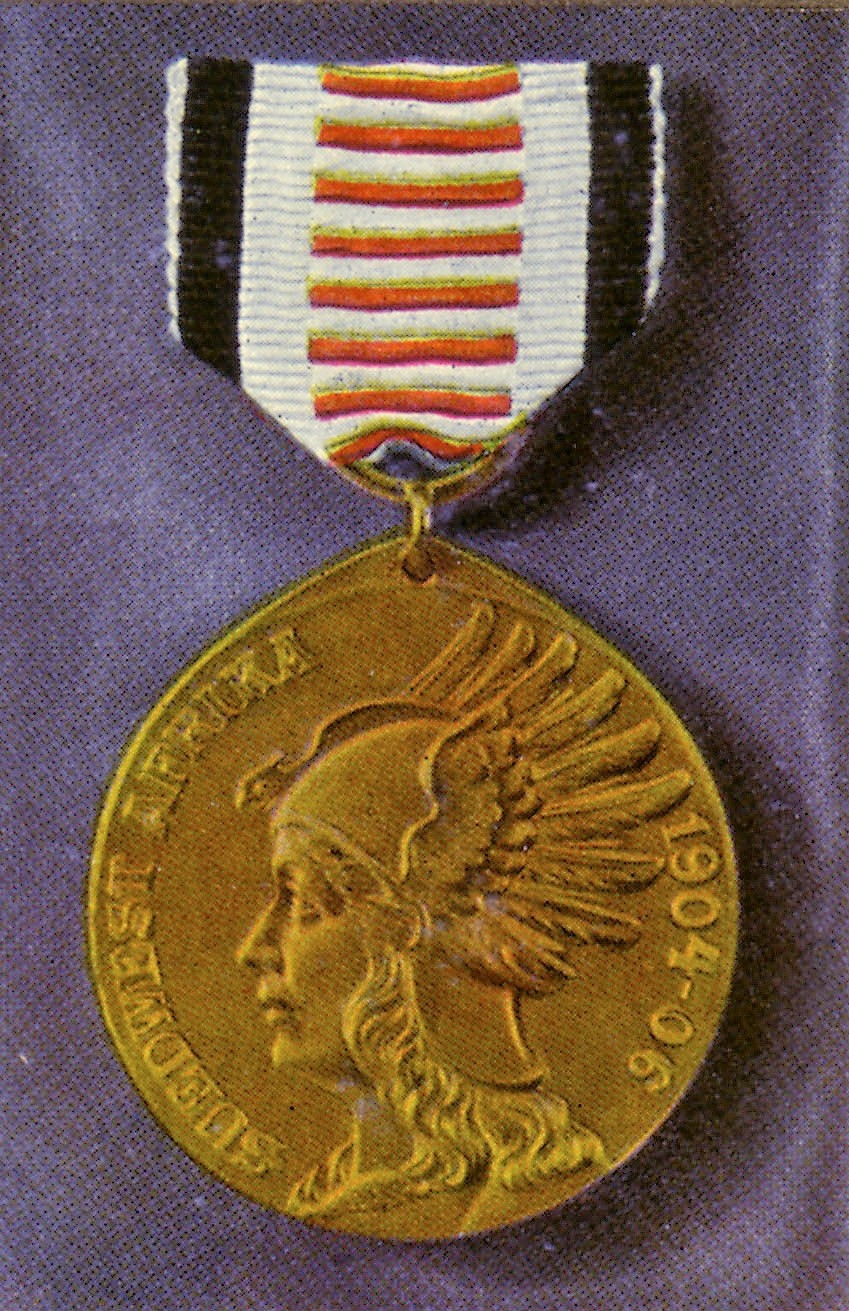
- Obverse view
- Type: Campaign medal
- Awarded for: Participation in the suppression of the Herero uprising, and in the Herero and Nama genocide
- Country: Germany
- Presented by: German Empire
- Eligibility: Military and civilians
- Clasps: 16
- Status: No longer awarded
- Established: 19 March 1907
- First award: 1907
- Related: Colonial Medal; China Commemorative Medal

The South West Africa Commemorative Medal (German: Südwestafrika Denkmünze) was instituted on 19 March 1907 by Wilhelm II in his capacity as German Emperor. It was issued to recognize the participants in the suppression of the Herero uprising in German South West Africa (present-day Namibia) that took place from 1904 to 1908 and which resulted in the Herero and Nama genocide.

== Eligibility ==
The medal could be awarded to all members of the armed forces of the German Empire that participated in the suppression of the native uprisings in German South West Africa, as well as to civilian non-combatant personnel, including those involved in the care of the sick and wounded. It also was awarded to individuals who had played a role in the preparations for deploying the armed forces, as well as to crew members of ships belonging to German shipping companies that transported troops and war materiel to and from the conflict.

Recipients of the award also included Boers and imperial British forces who participated in part of the conflict. The original qualifying period was from January 1904 through March 1907. In 1908, the pool of eligible recipients was expanded to include participants in an 1908 expedition to the Kalahari Desert in the British Bechuanaland Protectorate.

== Description ==
- The medal was a nearly round 32 mm disc with a metal loop at the top, designed to hold a suspension ring. For combatants, the medal was made of bronze; for non-combatants, it was made of steel.
- The obverse depicted an image of the head of Germania wearing a winged helmet and gorget, facing left. Around the edge was the inscription SUEDWEST AFRIKA 1904-06.
- The reverse featured at its center the imperial monogram W II in Gothic script, surmounted by an image of the German State Crown with two wafting ribbons. At the bottom, there were two crossed antique swords. The inscription DEN SIEGREICHEN STREITERN (To the Victorious Warriors) ran around the edge. The version for non-combatants bore the inscription VERDIENST UM DIE EXPEDITION (Service to the Expedition), and a laurel branch was depicted in place of the crossed swords.

== Ribbon and placement ==
The medal was worn on the left breast, suspended from a 32-mm-wide white ribbon featuring two longitudinal black marginal stripes (each 5 mm wide) and vermilion transverse ribs (15 mm long) in the center.

== Medal bars ==
For combatants, any of 16 medal bars could be awarded with the medal, providing the name(s) of the engagement(s) in which they had participated. For recipients who had taken part in multiple engagements, the bars were affixed one below the other in chronological order. The bars were made of gilt brass and were attached to the ribbon by means of pins on the back. They measured 7 mm in height and 33 mm in length, were bordered by a raised, polished edge, and bore the inscriptions in raised letters against a stippled background. The names are as follows:

- Herero-Land
- Omaruru
- Onganjira
- Waterberg
- Omaheke
- Groß-Namaland
- Fahlgras
- Toasis
- Karas-Berge
- Groß-Nabas
- Auob
- Nurudas
- Nossob
- Oranje
- Kalahari 1907
- Kalahari 1908

== Selected recipients ==
- Franz Ritter von Epp
- Hermann von François
- Joachim von Heydebreck
- Wilhelm Heye
- Heinrich Kirchheim
- Friedrich Sixt von Armin
- Maximilian von Speidel

== Sources ==
- Hessenthal, Waldemar von; Schreiber, Georg (2001). Honours and Awards of the German States (in German). Naval & Military Press. ISBN 978-1-843-42144-3.
- McGregor, Gordon (2007): German Medals, British Soldiers, and the Kalahari Desert: The South West Africa Commemorative Medal with the 'Kalahari' Bars Awarded to Imperial British Forces. Namibia Scientific Society. ISBN 978-9-991-64074-7
- Imperial Germany. South West Africa Commemorative Medal for Combatants, 1907 in Militaria Barcelona
