= Colonial Medal (German Empire) =

German Empire campaign medal

Colonial Commemorative Medal German: Kolonial-Denkmünze
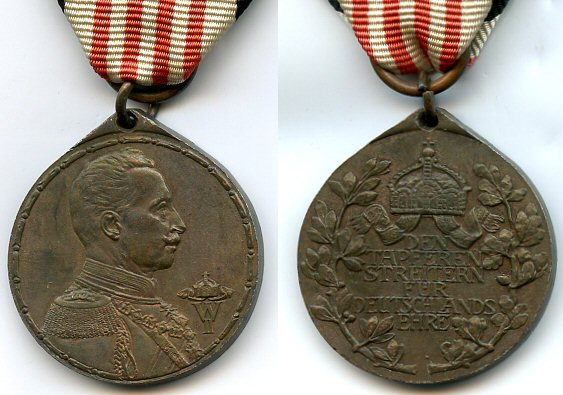
- Obverse and reverse views
- Type: Campaign medal
- Description: Round bronze medal
- Presented by: German Empire
- Eligibility: Participation in combat operations in the German colonial empire
- Clasps: 89
- Status: No longer awarded
- Established: 13 June 1912

Highlights
- Total recipients: 4,222
- Ribbon bar of the medal
- Related: China Commemorative Medal; South West Africa Commemorative Medal

The Colonial Medal, officially the Colonial Commemorative Medal (German: Kolonial-Denkmünze), was a medal of the German Empire established on 13 June 1912 by Kaiser Wilhelm II. It was awarded retroactively for participation in military operations in the German colonial empire, beginning with campaigns that took place as early as 1884.

== Eligibility ==
The medal was instituted to recognize the contribution of Imperial German Army and Imperial German Navy personnel, as well as both German and indigenous members of the Schutztruppe (protection force) and police forces who had participated in one or more military campaigns against indigenous insurgents in the various German colonies. Individuals who took part in combat outside the colonies, in defense of German nationals or German interests, were also eligible. Exceptions were participants in the Boxer Rebellion during 1900 and 1901, and the Herero and Nama War in the years 1904–1908. Participants in those large conflicts had already been awarded their own specific commemorative medals, the China Commemorative Medal and the South West Africa Commemorative Medal, respectively. A total of 4,222 Colonial Medals were awarded, of which 3,057 were issued to members of the navy.

== Description ==
- The medal was produced by the royal mint, and consisted of a nearly round bronze disc that tapered to a point at the top featuring a hole, through which passed a small, elongated ring that attached to a larger round suspension ring. There were two variants: the one for German combatants was 32-mm-wide, and the one for indigenous personnel measured 28-mm-wide. Apart from the difference in size, they were identical in their construction and embossing.
- The obverse depicted a right-facing bust-length image of Wilhelm II in military uniform by the Viennese sculptor Rudolf Marschall. On the right side was a small image of the kaiser's imperial monogram "W II", surmounted by an image of the German State Crown with a fluttering ribbon on each side. All were encircled by a decorative edging.
- The reverse contained a larger depiction of the crown and ribbons in the upper center. Below this was an inscription in capital letters on six lines, with one word on each: DEN TAPFEREN STREITERN FÜR DEUTSCHLANDS EHRE (To the brave warriors for Germany's honor). This was encircled by a branch of oak leaves on the right and laurel leaves on the left.

== Ribbon and placement ==
- The medal was won on the left breast, suspended from a ribbon. For German recipients, the white ribbon was 30 mm wide with four central red stripes, each 1.5-mm-wide, spaced 2 mm apart from one another and 4 mm from a black stripe on each edge. For indigenous recipients, the color scheme was the same but the ribbon was only 28 mm wide, with a corresponding reduction in the width of the stripes.

== Medal bars ==
Any of 89 official medal bars could be awarded with the medal, providing the name and year(s) of the campaign in which the recipient had participated. For combatants who had taken part in multiple campaigns, the bars were affixed one below the other in chronological order. The bars had to be purchased at the expense of the recipient. They were made of gilt brass and were attached to the ribbon by means of two soldered pins on the back. They measured 7 mm in height and 33 mm in width, were bordered by a narrow, raised, polished edge, and bore the inscriptions in raised capital Latin script against a stippled background. The names are as follows:

- DEUTSCH-NEUGUINEA 1893
- DEUTSCH-NEUGUINEA 1897
- DEUTSCH-NEUGUINEA 1899
- DEUTSCH-NEUGUINEA 1900
- DEUTSCH-NEUGUINEA 1901
- DEUTSCH-NEUGUINEA 1902
- DEUTSCH-NEUGUINEA 1903
- DEUTSCH-NEUGUINEA 1904
- DEUTSCH-NEUGUINEA 1905
- DEUTSCH-NEUGUINEA 1906
- DEUTSCH-NEUGUINEA 1907
- DEUTSCH-NEUGUINEA 1908
- DEUTSCH-NEUGUINEA 1909
- DEUTSCH-NEUGUINEA 1910
- DEUTSCH-NEUGUINEA 1911
- DEUTSCH-NEUGUINEA 1912
- DEUTSCH-NEUGUINEA 1913
- DEUTSCH-NEUGUINEA 1913/14
- DEUTSCH-OSTAFRIKA 1888/89
- DEUTSCH-OSTAFRIKA 1889/90
- DEUTSCH-OSTAFRIKA 1889/91
- DEUTSCH-OSTAFRIKA 1892
- DEUTSCH-OSTAFRIKA 1893
- DEUTSCH-OSTAFRIKA 1894
- DEUTSCH-OSTAFRIKA 1895
- DEUTSCH-OSTAFRIKA 1896
- DEUTSCH-OSTAFRIKA 1897
- DEUTSCH-OSTAFRIKA 1898
- DEUTSCH-OSTAFRIKA 1899
- DEUTSCH-OSTAFRIKA 1900
- DEUTSCH-OSTAFRIKA 1901
- DEUTSCH-OSTAFRIKA 1902
- DEUTSCH-OSTAFRIKA 1903
- DEUTSCH-OSTAFRIKA 1905/07
- DEUTSCH-OSTAFRIKA 1911
- DEUTSCH-OSTAFRIKA 1912
- KAMERUN 1884
- KAMERUN 1886/91
- KAMERUN 1889
- KAMERUN 1890
- KAMERUN 1891
- KAMERUN 1891/94
- KAMERUN 1893
- KAMERUN 1895/96
- KAMERUN 1897
- KAMERUN 1898
- KAMERUN 1898/99
- KAMERUN 1899
- KAMERUN 1899/1900
- KAMERUN 1900
- KAMERUN 1900/01
- KAMERUN 1901
- KAMERUN 1901/02
- KAMERUN 1902
- KAMERUN 1902/03
- KAMERUN 1903
- KAMERUN 1904
- KAMERUN 1904/05
- KAMERUN 1905
- KAMERUN 1906
- KAMERUN 1905/07
- KAMERUN 1906/07
- KAMERUN 1907/08
- KAMERUN 1909/09
- KAMERUN 1911
- KAMERUN 1912
- PONAPE 1910/11
- SAMOA 1888
- SÜDWEST-AFRIKA 1893/95
- SÜDWEST-AFRIKA 1896
- SÜDWEST-AFRIKA 1897
- SÜDWEST-AFRIKA 1897/98
- SÜDWEST-AFRIKA 1901
- SÜDWEST-AFRIKA 1903/04
- TOGO 1894/95
- TOGO 1895
- TOGO 1896
- TOGO 1896/97
- TOGO 1897
- TOGO 1897/98
- TOGO 1898
- TOGO 1898/99
- TOGO 1899
- TOGO 1900
- TOGO 1900/01
- TOGO 1901
- TOGO 1902
- TOGO 1903
- VENEZUELA 1902/03

== Selected recipients ==
- Friedrich Wilhelm von Lindeiner-Wildau
- Max Looff

== Sources ==
- Hessenthal, Waldemar von; Schreiber, Georg (2001). Honours and Awards of the German States. Naval & Military Press. ISBN 978-1-843-42144-3.
- André Hüsken: Katalog der Orden, Ehrenzeichen und Auszeichnungen des Kurfürstentums Brandenburg, der Markgrafschaften Brandenburg-Ansbach und Brandenburg-Bayreuth, des Königreiches Preußen, der Republik Preußen unter Berücksichtigung des Deutschen Reiches, Band 3, Hamburg 2001, ISBN 3-89757-138-2
- Kolonialdenkmunze in the Ehrenzeichen-Orden website
