= Hermann von François =

German army commander (1856–1933)

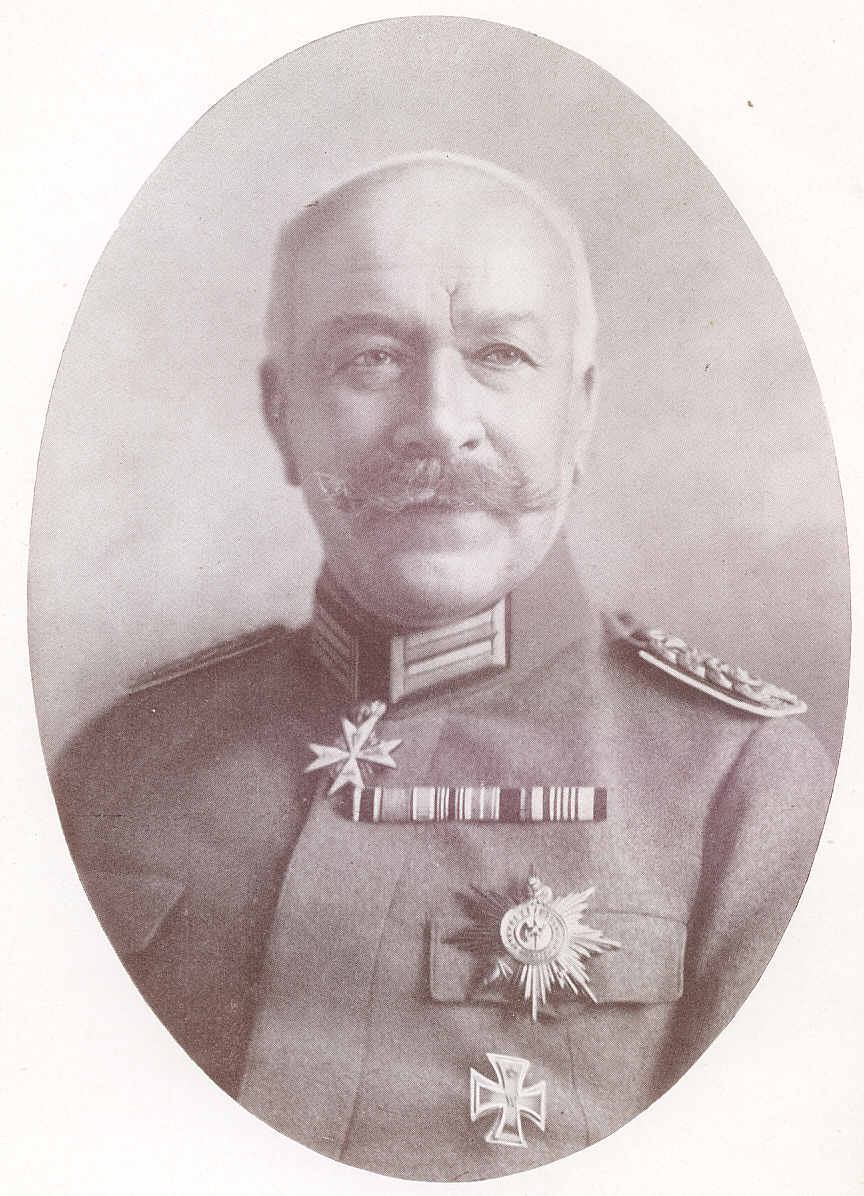
- Born: 31 January 1856; Luxembourg City, Grand Duchy of Luxembourg, German Confederation
- Died: 15 May 1933 (aged 77); Berlin, Province of Brandenburg, Nazi Germany
- Relatives: Curt von François (brother); Louise von François (aunt)
- Military career
- Allegiance: German Empire
- Branch: Imperial German Army
- Service years: 1875–1918
- Rank: General der Infanterie
- Commands: 49th (Hessian) Brigade; 13th Division; I Corps; 8th Army; XXXXI Reserve Corps; VII (Westphalian) Corps
- Conflicts: World War I: Battle of Stallupönen; Battle of Gumbinnen; Battle of Tannenberg
- Awards: see below
- Other work: memoirist, historian

Hermann Karl Bruno von François (31 January 1856 – 15 May 1933) was a German General der Infanterie during World War I, and is best known for his key role in several German victories on the Eastern Front in 1914.

== Early life and military career ==
Born in Luxembourg to a noble family of partial Huguenot extraction, François was exposed to a military life from an early age. His father Bruno von François was a Prussian major general and commander of the 27th Prussian Infantry Brigade who was killed in action leading his men during the Battle of Spicheren on 6 August 1870.

After attending cadet schools in Wahlstatt and in Berlin, François entered the Prussian Army on 15 April 1875 as a Seconde-Lieutenant (2nd Lieutenant) in the 1st Regiment of Foot Guards (1. Garde-Regiment zu Fuß) in Potsdam. On 25 March 1884, he was transferred to Schwerin as a company officer in the Grand Ducal Mecklenburg Grenadier Regiment No. 89 (Großherzoglich Mecklenburgisches Grenadier-Regiment Nr 89), with a predated patent of 16 October 1874. On 14 August 1884, he was promoted to Premier-Lieutenant (1st Lieutenant).

From 14 October 1884 to 21 July 1887, he attended the War Academy (Kriegsakademie) in Berlin. On 1 April 1888, he was commanded to the Great General Staff and on his promotion to Hauptmann (Captain) on 22 March 1889 transferred to the general staff. On 23 April 1889, François was posted as a general staff officer to the XV Corps based in Strasbourg (Imperial Territory of Alsace–Lorraine). On 27 January 1891, he was assigned as general staff officer on the staff of the 31st Division. On 29 March 1892, François was appointed commander of the 6th Company of the 2nd Lorraine Infantry Regiment (2. Lothringisches Infanterie-Regiment Nr. 131) in Metz.

On 1 February 1894, François was transferred to the general staff of the 8th Division in Mannheim as the chief of operations (1. Generalstabsoffizier or Ia). He was promoted to Major on 18 October 1894. On 17 December 1896, he was appointed Ia on the general staff of the IV Corps, based in Magdeburg. He returned to troop command on 25 March 1899 as commander of the I. Battalion of the 2nd Baden Grenadier Regiment "Kaiser Wilhelm I" No. 110 (2. Badisches Grenadier-Regiment "Kaiser Wilhelm I.“ Nr. 110) in Mannheim in the Grand Duchy of Baden.

On 25 June 1900, François returned to Magdeburg as Chief of the General Staff of the IV Corps, which from 27 January 1903 was commanded by General der Infanterie Paul von Hindenburg. On 18 April 1901, François was promoted to Oberstleutnant (lieutenant colonel) and on 18 April 1903 to Oberst (colonel). In 1901, François's mother, Marie took the family to German South-West Africa to follow her youngest son, Hugo von François who was a Hauptmann (captain) in the Schutztruppe. The family was based in the region during the Herero Wars, in which Hugo fought and was killed in action 13 March 1904 near Owikokorero. François' other brother, Curt von François, was a Prussian Major in the General Staff, later a well-known scientist and researcher specialising in Africa.

On 24 August 1904, François was seconded as acting commander to the 3rd Guards Grenadier Regiment "Queen Elisabeth" (Königin Elisabeth Garde-Grenadier-Regiment Nr. 3) in Charlottenburg and on 15 September 1904 he was named commander of the regiment. On 18 November 1907, he was named acting commander of the 49th Infantry Brigade in Darmstadt and with his promotion to Generalmajor on 27 January 1908 he was named commander of the brigade.

François was promoted to Generalleutnant on 20 March 1911 and given command of the 13th Division. On 1 October 1913, he took command of the I Corps based in Königsberg in the province of East Prussia.

== World War I ==
François began the war in August 1914 as commander of the I Corps under the 8th Army and was soon promoted to General der Infanterie on 19 August 1914. His task was to defend the easternmost regions of East Prussia against a Russian attack directed at the key city of Königsberg. The 8th Army would be expected to hold out against significantly larger Russian forces until it could be reinforced by troops coming from the west after the expected quick defeat of France, in accordance with the Schlieffen Plan, which would guide German forces in the opening phase of a war in which Germany faced both France and Russia.

When war broke out, François' corps faced the right wing of a two-pronged Russian invasion of East Prussia, led by Paul von Rennenkampf's Russian First Army. On 17 August the overall German theater commander, General Maximilian von Prittwitz und Gaffron, nervously eying the advance of the Russian left wing far to the south, ordered François to retreat while under heavy attack from Rennenkampf.

François, reluctant to surrender any territory, and naturally pugnacious, also felt breaking off while engaged would be deadly, and so he ignored Prittwitz' order, responding with the famous reply "General von François will withdraw when he has defeated the Russians!" He counterattacked Rennenkampf's massive army, bringing on the Battle of Stalluponen, and won a surprising victory while inflicting 5,000 casualties and taking 3,000 prisoners.

After winning the battle, François obeyed Prittwitz's order and withdrew 15 miles (24 km) to the west, where three days later he fought Rennenkampf to a draw at the Battle of Gumbinnen. François' aggressiveness resulted in the cautious Rennenkampf halting his advance westward.

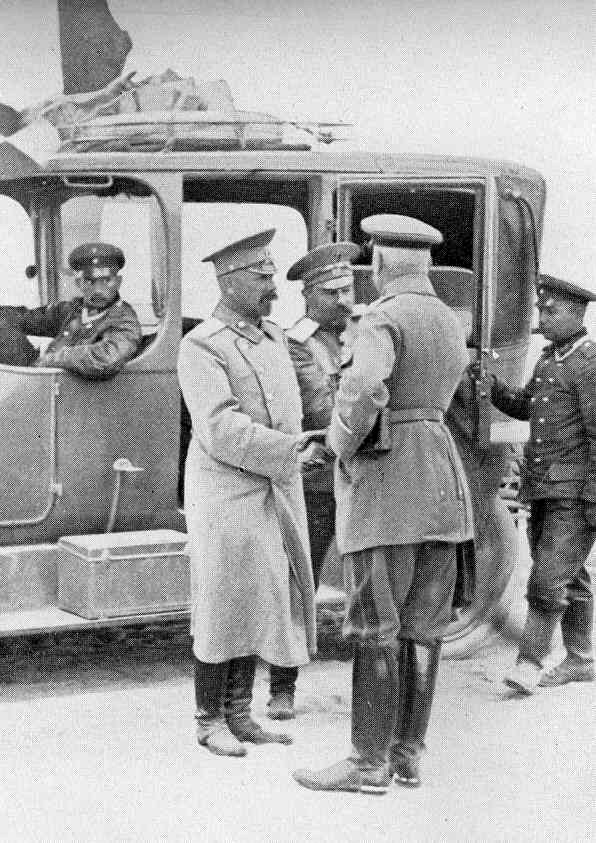
General von François (with his back to the camera) greets General Nikolai Klujev, commander of the Russian XIII Corps, who has been taken prisoner by Francois' troops, following the Battle of Tannenberg

Following that battle and a change of overall commanders (Prittwitz was judged to have lost his nerve by the German High Command), François' corps was transferred by rail to the southwest, to confront the Russian Second Army advancing into southern East Prussia under the command of General Alexander Samsonov. Although not trusted by the new German commanders Paul von Hindenburg and Erich Ludendorff due to his previous disobedience, François played the decisive role in the upcoming Battle of Tannenberg. On 27 August, François attacked the lead elements of Samsonov's army and began to make steady advances into their rear. Ludendorff, fearing a Russian counterattack by Rennenkampf, now ordered him to break off the advance. However, François twice ignored his direct orders and played a decisive role in the following encirclement and defeat of Samsonov's army.

When Hindenburg and Ludendorff went south to lead the 9th Army in Russian Poland, François remained with his corps in East Prussia and led it with much success in the First Battle of the Masurian Lakes the following month. When General Richard von Schubert, the new commander of the 8th Army, ordered him to retreat, he dispatched a telegram to the Supreme Army Command (Oberste Heeresleitung or OHL) describing his success and stating "the commander is badly counselled." The telegram impressed the Kaiser so much that he immediately relieved Schubert and, on 3 October, gave François temporary command of the 8th Army. He did not hold it for long. When Hindenburg and Ludendorff prepared their counter-attack from Thorn in the direction of Łódź, François was reluctant to send the requested I Corps, sending the badly trained and ill-equipped XXV Reserve Corps instead. That was too much for his superiors. In early November 1914 von François was removed and replaced by General Otto von Below.

After some time spent "on the shelf", François received the command of the XXXXI Reserve Corps (Note: In German military nomenclature, "41" is expressed as "XXXXI" rather than "XLI".) on 20 December 1914, and after a spell in the West, he returned to the Eastern Front in April 1915 where he took part in the Spring Offensive that conquered Russian Poland. He continued to distinguish himself. He was awarded the Pour le Mérite, Germany's highest military decoration, on 14 May 1915 for his performance in the breakthrough at Gorlice. On 30 June 1915 he was transferred back to the Western Front to take command of the Westphalian VII Corps in France, and in July 1916 a task force known as Meuse Group West (Maasgruppe West) in the Verdun sector. He added the Oak Leaves to his Pour le Mérite on 27 July 1917, for outstanding performance during the Battle of Verdun. During the German spring offensive of 1918, in the Third Battle of the Aisne, he led another task force, the Attack Group on the Oise (Angriffsgruppe an der Oise). Due to a conflict with Ludendorff, François was on 6 July 1918 placed on the standby list until 14 October 1918 when he retired.

== Post-war ==
After the war ended, François returned home and wrote several books on military history, including the best-seller (in Germany) Marneschlacht und Tannenberg in 1920. He was awarded an honorary doctorate by the University of Tübingen on 20 May 1925 for his scholarship in military history. He died on 15 May 1933 in Berlin of a kidney infection.

== Decorations and awards ==
Note: (Note: Dates are primarily from the award documents in François's Nachlass in the German Federal Archives.)

- Kingdom of Prussia:
  - Order Pour le Mérite (14 May 1915)
  - Oakleaves to the Order Pour le Mérite (27 July 1917)
  - Order of the Black Eagle
  - Order of the Red Eagle
    - Grand Cross with Oakleaves and Swords (14 October 1918)
    - 1st Class with Oakleaves and Swords (8 June 1918)
    - 2nd Class with Star, Oakleaves and the Royal Crown (Note: When awarded with the Royal Crown, lower classes of the Red Eagle continued to be worn after a higher class was awarded.)
      - 2nd Class with Oakleaves (19 August 1909)
      - Crown to the 2nd Class with Oakleaves (25 April 1910)
      - Star to the 2nd Class with Oakleaves and the Royal Crown (18 January 1913)
  - Order of the Crown, 1st Class (18 January 1914)
  - Iron Cross, 1st and 2nd Class
  - Officer's Service Decoration Cross for 25 years' service (18 June 1900)
  - Kaiser Wilhelm I Memorial Medal (Centenary Medal) (22 March 1897)
  - China Commemorative Medal in Steel (25 July 1902)
  - South West Africa Commemorative Medal in Steel (2 September 1907)
  - Commemorative Badge for the Silver Anniversary of the Imperial Couple (27 February 1906)
- Hohenzollern: Princely House Order of Hohenzollern, Commander's Cross of Honor (26 March 1908)
- Duchy of Anhalt: Order of Albert the Bear, Commander 2nd Class (3 May 1899)
- Grand Duchy of Baden: Order of the Zähringer Lion, Commander 1st Class (5 May 1909)
- Bavaria:
  - Military Merit Order, 2nd Class (17 May 1909)
  - Military Merit Order, 1st Class with Swords (6 November 1915)
- (Bremen (state)) Free and Hanseatic City of Bremen: Hanseatic Cross (25 January 1916)
- Free and Hanseatic City of Hamburg: Hanseatic Cross (Note: Shown on ribbon bar in photo in infobox.)
- Grand Duchy of Hesse: Order of Philip the Magnanimous, Commander 1st Class (12 September 1910)
- Principality of Lippe:
  - House Order of the Cross of Honor, 1st Class (9 February 1912)
  - House Order of the Cross of Honor, 1st Class with Swords (18 October 1915)
  - War Merit Cross (19 January 1915)
  - War Honor Cross for Heroic Deeds (15 April 1915)
- Free and Hanseatic City of Lübeck: Hanseatic Cross (Note: Shown on ribbon bar in photo in infobox.)
- Principality of Reuß jüngere Linie: Princely Reuss Honor Cross, 2nd Class (29 December 1896)
- (Duchy of Saxe-Altenburg) (Saxe-Coburg and Gotha) (Saxe-Meiningen) Saxon Duchies: Ducal Saxe-Ernestine House Order, Commander 2nd Class (29 December 1896)
- Duchy of Saxe-Altenburg: Jubilee Medal (3 August 1903)
- Principality of Schaumburg-Lippe: Cross for Loyal Service 1914 (1 March 1916) (Note: Shown on ribbon bar in photo in infobox.)
- Principality of Schwarzburg-Rudolstadt and Principality of Schwarzburg-Sondershausen: Princely Schwarzburg Honor Cross, 2nd Class (combined award from both principalities, 13 January 1897)
- Austria-Hungary: Order of the Iron Crown, 1st Class with War Decoration (21 May 1915)
- Republic of Chile: Order of Merit, 1st Class (28 September 1912)
- Kingdom of Greece: Order of the Redeemer, Commander's Cross
- Kingdom of Italy: Order of Saints Maurice and Lazarus, Commander's Cross (31 January 1903)

== Bibliography ==
- Hanns Möller-Witten: Geschichte der Ritter des "Ordens pour le mérite" im Weltkrieg, Band I: A–L, Verlag Bernard & Graefe, Berlin 1935.
- Ronald Pawly, Patrice Courcelle: The Kaiser's Warlords: German Commanders of World War I, 2003.

Military offices
Preceded by General der Artillerie Richard von Schubert	Commander, 8th Army; 9 October 1914 – 7 November 1914	Succeeded by General der Infanterie Otto von Below
