= Friedrich Sixt von Armin =

German general who participated in the Franco-Prussian War and the First World War

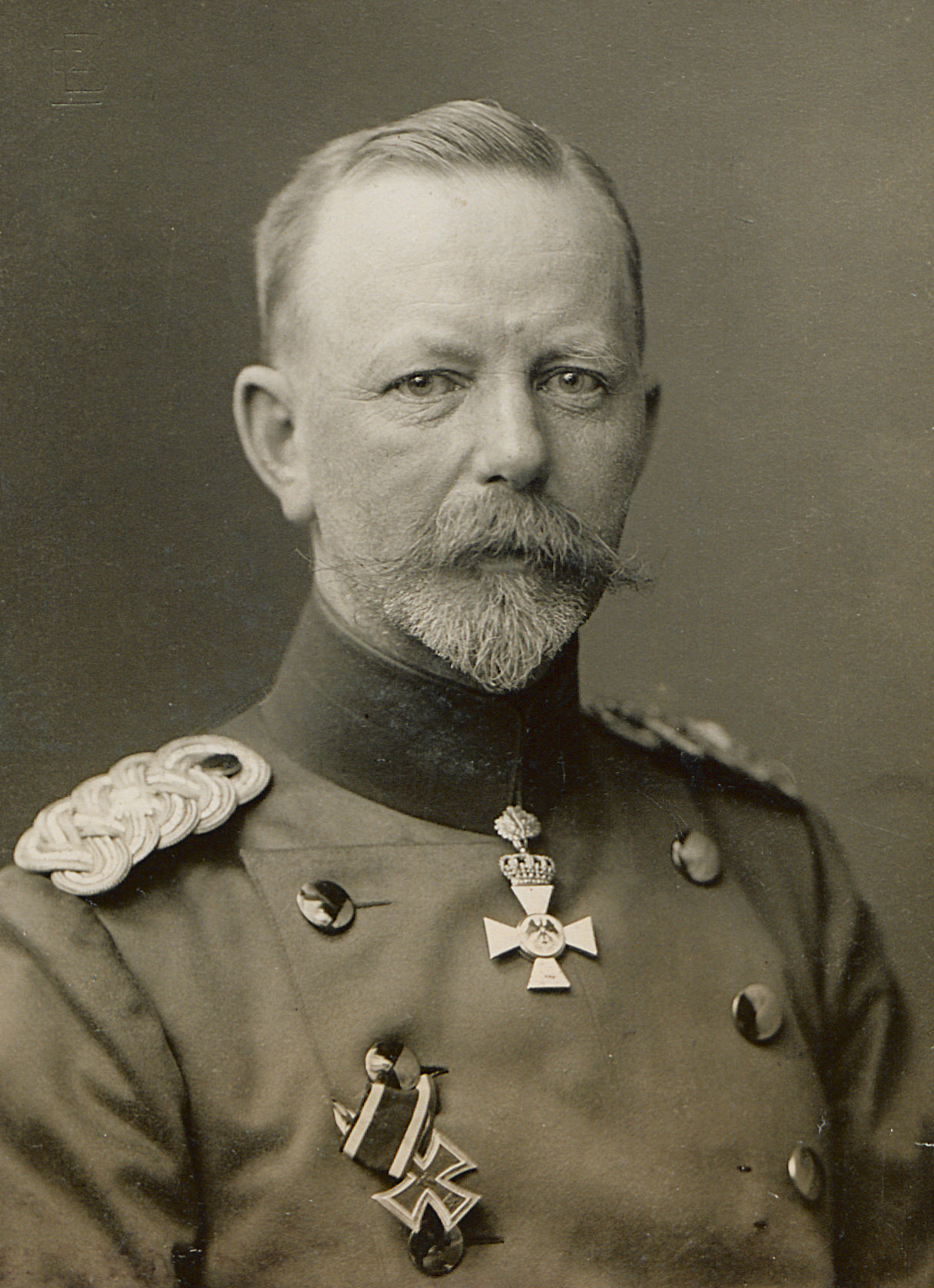
- Sixt von Armin in 1916
- Born: 27 November 1851; Wetzlar, Rhine Province, Prussia
- Died: 30 September 1936 (aged 84); Magdeburg, Saxony, Nazi Germany
- Relatives: Hans-Heinrich Sixt von Armin (son)
- Military career
- Allegiance: Prussia; German Empire
- Branch: Army
- Service years: 1870–1919
- Rank: General
- Commands: 13th Division; IV Corps; 4th Army
- Conflicts: Franco-Prussian War; Battle of Gravelotte (WIA); First World War; Western Front; Battle of Passchendale; Battle of Lys
- Awards: Pour le Mérite

Friedrich Bertram Sixt von Armin (27 November 1851 – 30 September 1936) was a Prussian and German general who participated in the Franco-Prussian War and was a senior commander in the First World War. In the latter he participated in many battles on the Western Front, including the Battles of Passchendaele and the Lys. He was the recipient of many decorations for his leadership, including the Order Pour le Mérite with Oakleaves, Prussia's highest military honor.

== Family ==
Friedrich Bertram Sixt von Armin was born on 27 November 1851 in Wetzlar, an exclave of the Rhine Province, Kingdom of Prussia, as the son of Heinrich Joseph Jacob Sixt von Armin (†1872), a career officer, and Amöne, née Hiepe (†1901). He was married on 11 June 1882 to Klara Pauline Auguste Henriette Karoline von Voigts-Rhetz (1 October 1859 - 28 November 1937), the daughter of General der Artillerie Julius von Voigts-Rhetz (1822-1904) The couple had two daughters and three sons. One son, Friedrich-Wilhelm (1889-1914), was killed in action in France as a Leutnant in Garde-Grenadier-Regiment Nr. 4. Another, Hans-Heinrich, was also career officer, reaching the rank of Generalleutnant (lieutenant general); he was taken a prisoner of war in 1942 and died in the Soviet Union in 1952.

== Military career ==
Sixt von Armin entered service as an Avantageur on 16 July 1870 in 4. Garde-Grenadier-Regiment „Königin“ (later renamed Königin Augusta Garde-Grenadier-Regiment Nr. 4). He was wounded by rifle rounds in both legs in the fighting near Saint-Privat-la-Montagne on 18 August 1870 while serving with the regiment's 11th Company. He was commissioned a Secondelieutenant on 9 March 1872 with a Patent of 12 January 1871. He served as regimental adjutant from 18 April 1876 to 21 March 1881 and was promoted to Premierlieutenant on 17 February 1880.

From 1 April 1881 to 15 April 1884, Sixt von Armin served as adjutant of the 3rd Guards Infantry Brigade. This was followed by a one-year assignment to the Great General Staff on 1 May 1884, which was then extended for a second year. On 17 April 1886, he was promoted to Hauptmann and transferred to the auxiliary establishment (Nebenetat) of the Great General Staff. On 7 February 1888, he was transferred to the Great General Staff and on 26 May 1888 to the general staff of the 22nd Division. On 12 January 1889 he was assigned to the Ministry of War in Berlin. He was transferred to Grenadier-Regiment König Friedrich Wilhelm IV. (1. Pommersches) Nr. 2 as a company commander on 15 July 1890.

On 22 March 1891, Sixt von Armin was promoted to Major, transferred back to the General Staff of the Army, and assigned to the general staff of the VII Army Corps. On 15 July 1893, he was transferred to the Great General Staff and on 18 August 1896, he was named a battalion commander in Magdeburgisches Füsilier-Regiment Nr. 36. On 22 March 1897, he was promoted to Oberstlieutenant and on 20 July 1897 he became Chief of the General Staff of the XIII (Württemberg) Army Corps in Stuttgart.

On 27 January 1900, Sixt von Armin was promoted to Oberst From 18 October 1900 to 14 November 1901, he commanded Infanterie-Regiment Graf Bülow von Dennewitz (6. Westfälisches) Nr. 55. He was then named Chief of the General Staff of the Guards Corps.

On 18 April 1903, Sixt von Armin was promoted to Generalmajor. He returned to the Ministry of War on 2 June 1903 and on 18 August was named director of the General War Department (Allgemeines Kriegsdepartment). In this capacity he also served as deputy plenipotentiary to the Bundesrat of the German Empire, chairman of the Reichs-Rayon-Kommission, and member of the Imperial Disciplinary Court (Reichsdisziplinarhof).

On 25 October 1906, Sixt von Armin was promoted to Generalleutnant. He was named commander of the 13th Division on 30 July 1908. On 20 March 1911, he took provisional command of the IV Army Corps in Magdeburg and on 7 April 1911, he was promoted to General der Infanterie and formally named commanding general of the corps.

== World War I ==
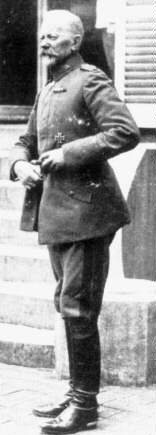

Sixt von Armin led the IV Army Corps into Brussels on 20 August 1914, and then engaged with the enemy in the Battle of Mons on 23 and 24 August 1914. On 26 August, the corps engaged the British at Le Cateau.

His corps then participated in the First Battle of the Marne. At the end of September 1914, as part of the Race to the Sea, the corps was transferred to the 6th Army in the Artois region, where it remained in trench warfare until mid-1916. Among the major battles were the Battle of Arras in early October 1914 and in the fighting by La Bassée and Arras, including at the Loretto Heights (Lorettoschlacht), followed by the Battle of Loos in the autumn of 1915, and the Battle of the Somme from 12 to 25 July 1916 and from mid-September to early October 1916. He was awarded the Order Pour le Mérite on 10 August 1916 for his leadership in the Battle of the Somme.

From 1 March 1917 to 29 November 1918, he was supreme commander of the 4th Army in Flanders. He led the army in the defensive battles in Flanders in 1917, especially from May to July 1917 in the Battle of Messines and at Wytschaete, and from July to early December 1917 in the Third Battle of Ypres or the Battle of Passchendaele. These battles included the Battle of Pilckem Ridge (31 July – 2 August), the Battle of Langemarck (16–18 August), the Battle of the Menin Road Ridge (20–25 September), the Battle of Polygon Wood (26 September – 3 October), the Battle of Poelcappelle (9 October), the First Battle of Passchendaele (12 October) and the Second Battle of Passchendaele (26 October – 10 November). For his leadership in the heavy fighting, he would be decorated with the Oakleaves to the Pour le Mérite on 3 August 1917.

From 10 to 25 April 1918, during the Battle of the Lys (Fourth Battle of Ypres), the army captured Messines, Wytschaete and the Ypres bend and stormed the Kemmel. However, the German offensive then lost momentum, and the Germans went back on the defensive. The 4th Army was forced to give more ground in the Fifth Battle of Ypres, including losing control of the Flanders coast and the key submarine bases there. After the Allies defeated his forces on the Lys on 25 October, Sixt von Armin was forced to pull the 4th Army back to the Antwerp–Maas defensive position, where it remained until the Armistice.

On 29 November 1918, Sixt von Armin took command of Army Group Crown Prince Rupprecht from its namesake, Field Marshal Crown Prince Rupprecht of Bavaria, and led the formation, redesignated Army Group A, in the withdrawal from Allied territory back to Paderborn, where Sixt von Armin's command was demobilized. He retired from the army on 2 January 1919.

== Later life ==
After the war, Sixt von Armin lived in Magdeburg, Province of Saxony, where he was a popular speaker and made frequent appearances at public events. When he died in 1936, he was buried with full military honors.

== Decorations and awards ==
- Kingdom of Prussia:
  - Order of the Black Eagle (25 December 1917)
  - Order Pour le Mérite (10 August 1916) with Oakleaves (3 August 1917)
  - Order of the Red Eagle
    - Grand Cross with Oakleaves and Swords
    - 2nd Class with Oakleaves and the Royal Crown
  - Order of the Crown, 1st Class (1911)
  - Iron Cross 2nd Class (1870)
  - Iron Cross 1st Class (3 September 1914)
  - Officer's Service Decoration Cross for 25 years' service
  - Kaiser Wilhelm Memorial Medal (Centenary Medal) (22 March 1897)
- German Empire:
  - China Commemorative Medal in Steel
  - South West Africa Commemorative Medal in Steel
- Hohenzollern Principalities: Princely House Order of Hohenzollern, Cross of Honor 1st Class with Swords (30 November 1917)
- Duchy of Anhalt:
  - Order of Albert the Bear
    - Grand Cross (1912)
    - Swords to the Grand Cross
  - Friedrich Cross
- Bavaria:
  - Military Merit Order
    - 1st Class (3 September 1908)
    - 1st Class with Swords (30 October 1914)
    - Grand Cross with Swords
  - Military Order of Max Joseph, Grand Cross (9 March 1918)
- Duchy of Brunswick: War Merit Cross, 2nd Class
- (Bremen (state)) Free and Hanseatic City of Bremen: Hanseatic Cross (29 June 1918)
- Free and Hanseatic City of Hamburg: Hanseatic Cross (16 May 1916)
- Grand Duchy of Hesse: Order of Philip the Magnanimous, Commander's Cross
- Principality of Lippe: House Order of the Cross of Honor, 1st Class
- Kingdom of Saxony:
  - Military Order of St. Henry
    - Commander 2nd Class (23 September 1917)
    - Commander 1st Class (7 October 1918)
  - Albert Order
    - Grand Cross with the Golden Star (1912)
    - Swords to the Grand Cross with the Golden Star
- (Duchy of Saxe-Altenburg) (Saxe-Coburg and Gotha) (Saxe-Meiningen) Saxon Duchies: Ducal Saxe-Ernestine House Order
  - Grand Cross (1912)
  - Swords to the Grand Cross (9 December 1914)
- Duchy of Saxe-Altenburg: Duke Ernst Medal 1st Class with Swords
- Kingdom of Württemberg:
  - Order of the Württemberg Crown
    - Officer's Cross
    - Grand Cross with Swords
  - Friedrich Order, Commander 1st Class
- Austria-Hungary: Order of Franz Joseph, Commander
- Kingdom of Italy: Order of the Crown of Italy, Grand Commander
- Empire of Persia: Order of the Lion and the Sun, Grand Officer
- Kingdom of Sweden: Order of the Sword, Commander 2nd Class (1903)
- Ottoman Empire:
  - Order of Osmanieh, 1st Class with Sabers (13 November 1917)
  - Liakat Medal in Silver with Sabers (6 November 1917)
  - War Medal (6 November 1917)

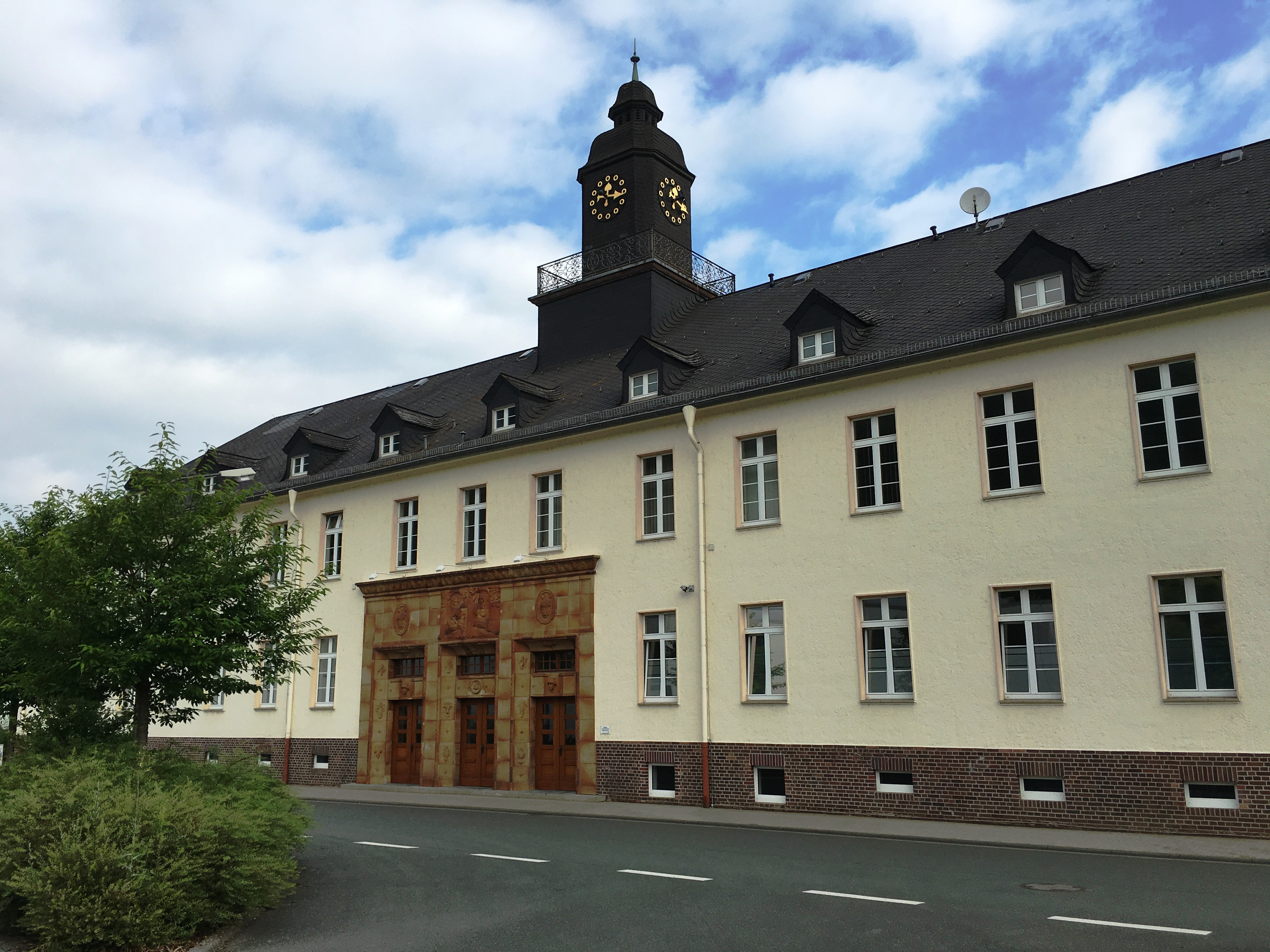
Staff building of the former Sixt-von-Armin-Kaserne in Wetzlar

=== Additional honours ===
- The honorary title "Lion of Flanders" (Der Löwe von Flandern) was given to Sixt von Armin, his Chief of the General Staff Fritz von Loßberg, and Admiral Ludwig von Schröder, the commander of the Marinekorps Flandern.
- A Kaserne (barracks) (1928) and Sixt-von-Armin-Weg (1933), both in Magdeburg, were named after him, although both were subsequently renamed.
- A Bundeswehr barracks in Wetzlar was renamed the Sixt-von-Armin-Kaserne in 1964. It was closed in 1993 and converted to commercial and residential properties.

== Notes ==
Military offices
Preceded by Generalfeldmarschall Albrecht, Duke of Württemberg	Commander, 4th Army; 25 February 1917–28 January 1919	Succeeded by Dissolved
