= Hugo Meurer =

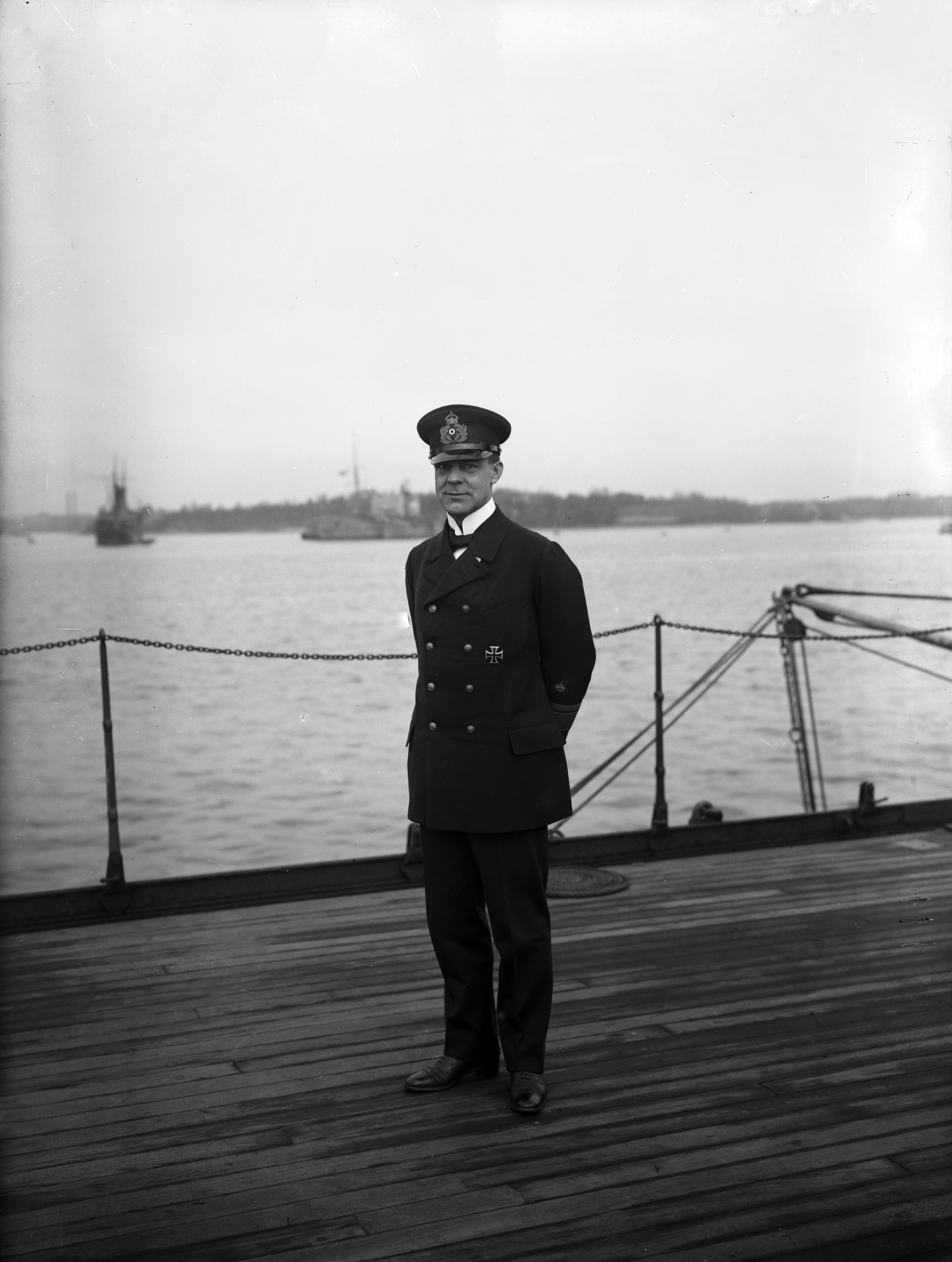
- Hugo Meurer on April 19, 1918 on board SMS Prinzregent Luitpold in Helsinki
- Born: 28 May 1869; Sallach, Carinthia, Austria-Hungary
- Died: 4 January 1960 (aged 90); Kiel, Germany
- Military career
- Allegiance: German Empire
- Branch: Imperial German Navy
- Service years: 1886–1920
- Rank: Vice Admiral
- Commands: 4th Battle Squadron; Baltic Sea Division
- Conflicts: First World War; Finnish Civil War
- Awards: Iron Cross 1914 (2nd and 1st class); Bavarian Military Merit Order III Class With Crown and Swords; Saxon Albrecht Order II Class Commanders Cross; Prussian Lifesaving Medal; Crowned Order of the Red Eagle (3rd class); Prussian Long Service Cross (25 Years); Oldenburg Friedrich August Cross; Mecklenburg-Schwerin Military Merit Cross (1914, 2nd class); China Commemorative Medal; Wilhelm I Centenary Medal; Order of the Cross of Liberty (1st clss, Finland); Qing Dynasty Order of the Double Dragon III Class, I Grade; Commander of the Order of Saints Maurice and Lazarus

Hugo Meurer (28 May 1869 – 4 January 1960) was a vice-admiral of the Kaiserliche Marine (German Imperial Navy). Meurer was the German naval officer who handled the negotiations of the internment of the German fleet in November 1918 at the end of the First World War.

== Life ==
Meurer was born in Sallach in Carinthia. On 16 April 1886 he joined the Kaiserliche Marine.

During the First World War he served as commander of SMS Deutschland at the Battle of Jutland, and from 1916 to 1917 as captain of the battleship SMS König. In 1917 he was promoted to the rank of rear-admiral (Konteradmiral), as the second Admiral of the 4th Battle Squadron of the High Seas Fleet, which he remained until the end of the war.

From 21 February to 2 May 1918, as commander of the special unit (Sonderverband) of the Baltic Sea, he led the naval expedition for the German intervention in the ongoing civil war in Finland. In November 1918 Meurer negotiated as representative of Admiral Franz von Hipper with Admiral David Beatty the details of the surrender of the German fleet.

Meurer was also the naval station commander of the Baltic, based in Kiel. He was dismissed on 8 January 1920, after derogatory remarks against the government, but still received the character (an unpaid honorary title) of vice-admiral.

He died in 1960 in Kiel, where he was buried at the Nordfriedhof in Kiel.

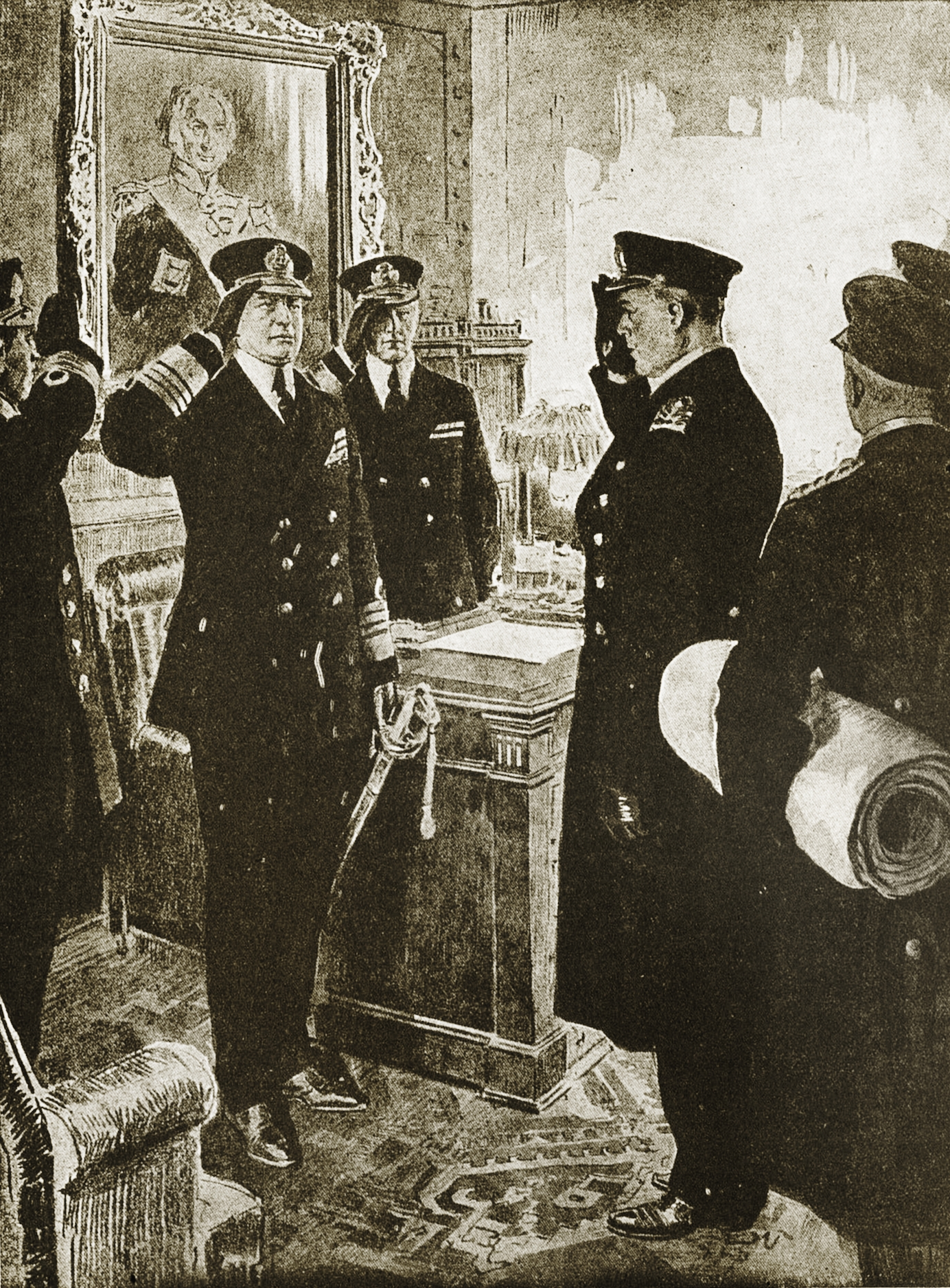
Admiral Meurer reports to Admiral Beatty on HMS Queen Elizabeth about the transfer negotiations for the High Seas Fleet.
