= Friedrich Wilhelm von Lindeiner-Wildau =

German Military Wehrmacht Luftwaffe officer

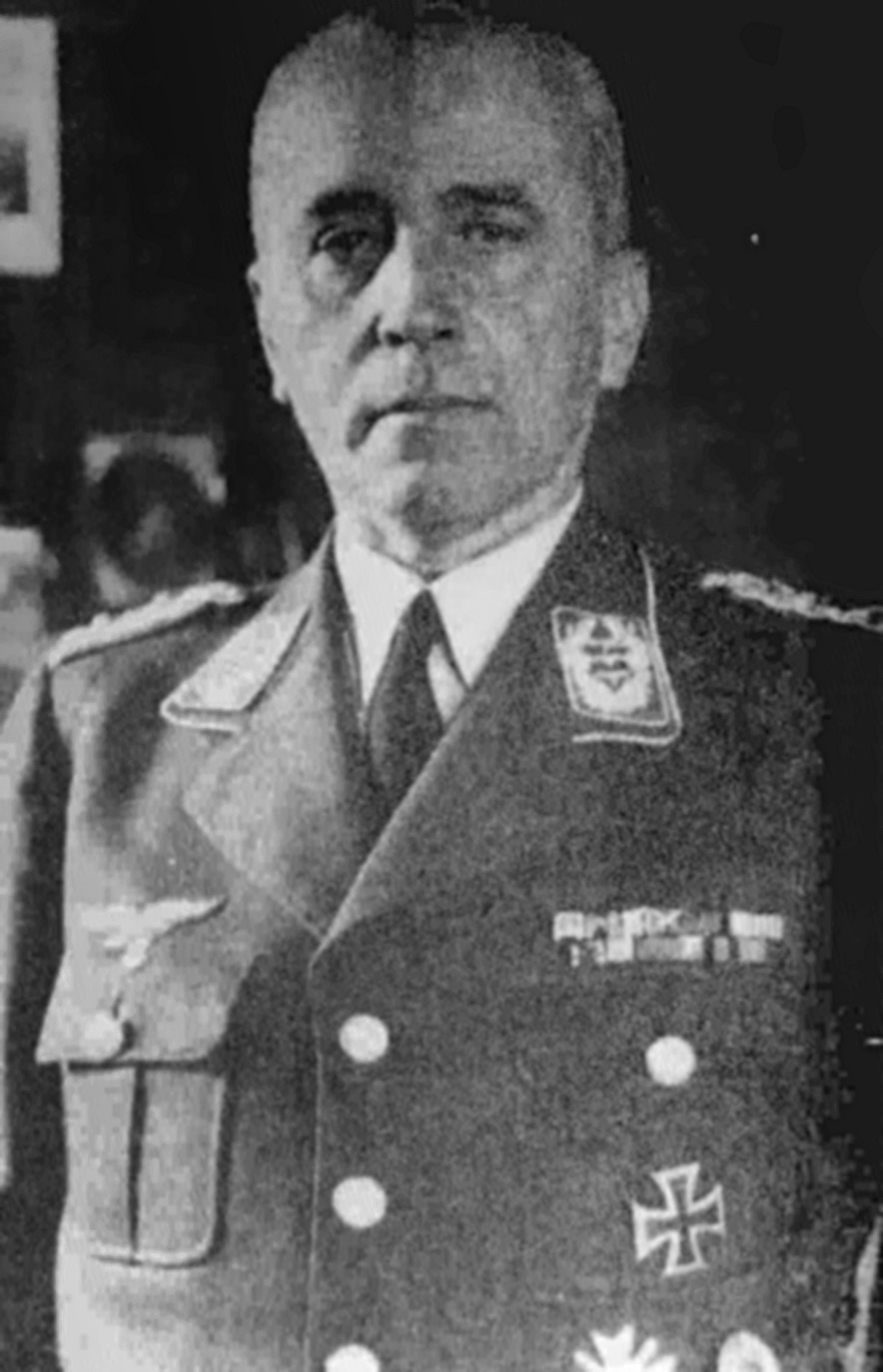
- Friedrich Wilhelm von Lindeiner-Wildau c. 1940s
- Born: 12 December 1880; Glatz, Province of Silesia, German Empire (present-day Kłodzko, Poland)
- Died: 22 May 1963 (aged 82); Frankfurt am Main, Hessen, West Germany
- Military career
- Allegiance: German Empire (to 1918); Weimar Republic (to 1933); Nazi Germany (to 1945)
- Branch: Prussian Army (1898–1902, 1908–19); Schutztruppe (1902–08); Luftwaffe (1937–45)
- Service years: 1898–1919; 1937–1945
- Rank: Oberst
- Commands: Stalag Luft III; Fusilier Battalion, 1st Foot Guards; 2nd Battalion, 1st Foot Guards
- Conflicts: Maji Maji Rebellion; World War I: First Battle of Ypres; World War II
- Awards: Knight 1st Class with Swords of the Saxe-Ernestine House Order; Honor Cross 3rd Class with Swords of the Princely Order of Hohenzollern; Order of the Crown, 4th Class; Iron Cross, 1st Class; Iron Cross, 2nd Class

Friedrich-Wilhelm Franz Max Erdmann Gustav von Lindeiner genannt von Wildau (12 December 1880 – 22 May 1963) was a German Staff Officer of the Luftwaffe during World War II. He is best known today for having been the commandant of Stalag Luft III, which is famous for the 'great escape' which took place in 1944.

== Military career ==
Friedrich Wilhelm von Lindeiner genannt von Wildau was born at Glatz (Kłodzko, Poland) in 1880. He entered the 3. Garde-Regiment zu Fuß as a second lieutenant on graduating from the Corps of Cadets on 15 March 1898. On 1 May 1902 he left the Prussian Army and the following day entered the Schutztruppe for German East Africa. Here, von Lindeiner-Wildau served as the Adjutant of Gustav Adolf von Götzen, the Governor of German East Africa, from 20 June to 13 September 1905 and as the Headquarters Adjutant of the Schutztruppe for German East Africa from 7 September to 11 October 1906. Von Lindeiner was awarded the Prussian Order of the Crown for his role in helping to put down the Maji Maji Rebellion against the German colonialists. He left Schutztruppe service on 31 July 1908 and rejoined the Prussian Army on 1 August 1908 with a simultaneous promotion to Oberleutnant and was assigned to the 4. Garde-Regiment zu Fuß. On 20 July 1912, on promotion to captain, von Lindeiner-Wildau was assigned as the Commander of the 11th company of 1. Garde-Regiment zu Fuß.

=== World War I ===
On 10 August 1914, he was assigned as the Commander of the Infanterie-Stabswache ("Infantry Staff Guard") at the Kaiser's General Field Headquarters. On 19 September he returned to his regiment as Commander of the 11th company, where he was wounded during the First Battle of Ypres on 17 November 1914. Returning to duty on 13 April 1915 he assumed command of the regiment's 5th company, and then of its second battalion on 27 May 1915. He was again wounded during the pursuit between the Bug River and Jasiolda on 29 August 1915. On returning to duty von Lindeiner-Wildau assumed command of the Füsilier battalion of 1. Garde-Regiment zu Fuß and was again severely wounded on 5 December 1915 in fighting around Roye-Noyon.

On 24 September 1914 von Lindeiner-Wildau was assigned to Etappen-Inspektion 5 (Lines of Communication Inspectorate) and on 4 October 1916 he was assigned as the Personal Adjutant of Prince Joachim of Prussia. After his return to his Regiment on 30 October 1917 he became the Adjutant to the Governor of Riga-Dünamünde. Appointed as Adjutant to the Garde-Reserve-Korps on 23 April 1918 he was promoted to major on 15 July 1918. His final wartime appointment was as Adjutant of the 4th Army, a post he assumed on 8 November 1918.

=== World War II ===
Following the Armistice von Lindeiner-Wildau was leader of the collecting point in Potsdam of the Volunteer Border Protection Unit East and Ober Ost (Grenzschutz Ost / Ober Ost) from 18 January 1919. He retired on 20 September 1919 with permission to wear the uniform of the 1. Garde-Regiment zu Fuß. He worked in several civilian posts, and married a Dutch baroness.

He spent several years in business, and travelled extensively around Europe and the Americas. As he was based in the Netherlands, von Lindeiner was able to watch the growth of Nazism from afar, and he had little time for it. When he and his wife moved to Germany in 1932, they refused to join the Nazi Party, despite the deleterious effect this had on his business and social connections. Von Lindeiner was a staunch supporter of Germany but held anti-Nazi views. Nevertheless, despite his manifest anti-Nazism, von Lindeiner felt obliged to accept a position in the Luftwaffe in 1937 as one of Hermann Göring's personal staff. He unsuccessfully tried to retire on the grounds of ill health, and his appointment to be the Kommandant of Stalag Luft III at Sagan (today Żagań in Poland) in the spring of 1942 during World War II therefore represented an opportunity to serve his country without directly serving the regime he so despised.

He installed himself and his family at the Jeschkendorf Manor, some 3 miles (4.8 km) west of Sagan. Deputy Commandant Major Gustav Simoleit described von Lindeiner as an "honest, open-minded, liberal man [who] influenced and formed with his plans, ideas and orders the whole spirit in the relations between the prisoners and the German personnel". He was universally respected by both his staff and the POWs. There were rumours that German captives were being mistreated by the Allies, and there was an appetite for reprisal. One day, von Lindeiner summoned Simoleit for a confidential discussion. Lindeiner said, "Major Simoleit, you know our last information about bad treatment and even killing of German soldiers in England. We have to face a grave situation. What have we do if Hitler wants more reprisals and sends us a strict order to shoot a number of our prisoners?" Simoleit answered immediately, "If I should receive such a dreadful order I would refuse to obey. I prefer in this case to be executed myself for military insubordination and would not try to save my miserable life by obeying." Von Lindeiner shook Simoleit's hand, "We both know what we have to do."

The Gestapo investigated the escape and, whilst this uncovered no significant new information, von Lindeiner was removed and threatened with court martial. He feigned mental illness to avoid imprisonment.

In February 1945, he was wounded by Russian troops advancing towards Berlin while acting as second in command of an infantry unit defending Sagan. He later surrendered to advancing British forces as the war ended. Von Lindeiner donated material and a stone for the memorial to the murdered fifty escapees down the road toward Sagan.

Von Lindeiner was imprisoned for two years at the British prisoner of war camp known as the "London Cage". He testified during the British SIB investigation concerning the Stalag Luft III murders. Allied former prisoners at Stalag Luft III testified that he had followed the Geneva Conventions concerning the treatment of POWs and had won the respect of the senior prisoners. He was repatriated in 1947.

He died in 1963 at the age of 82, less than two months before the film The Great Escape was released.

== Awards ==
Friedrich von Lindeiner-Wildau received the Prussian Order of the Crown 4th Class with Swords for the brutal fighting in the German East Africa campaign of 1905–07. He was also awarded the Colonial Commemorative Medal with that medal bar. During World War I he was awarded the Saxe-Ernestine House Order – Knight 1st Class with Swords (1 May 1918) as Hauptmann and 1st Adjutant of the Government of Riga and the Mouth of the Düna, and the House Order of Hohenzollern Knight's Cross with Swords on 5 February 1915. He was also awarded the Iron Cross First and Second Class.

== Legacy ==
Von Lindeiner was the basis for the character "Colonel von Luger" in the film The Great Escape, played by actor Hannes Messemer.

He has been portrayed by Manfred Andrae in the made-for-TV film The Great Escape II: The Untold Story (1988). He is depicted as being executed by firing squad for his failure to prevent the breakout.
