= Kinjikitile Ngwale =

Tanzanian freedom fighter

Kinjikitile "Bokero" Ngwale, also spelled Kinjeketile, (died 4 August 1905) was a spiritual medium and leader of the 1904–1905 Maji Maji Rebellion against colonial rule in German East Africa (present-day Tanzania).

== Biography ==
Kinjikitile was a member of the Matumbi people, living in what is now Kilwa District of Lindi Region in Tanzania (then German East Africa, later Tanganyika). The Matumbi practiced religious forms of folk Islam. In 1904, the then relatively unknown Kinjikitile disappeared from his home in Ngarambe. He returned after a few days and claimed that he had been possessed by a spirit medium called Hongo, believed to take the form of a snake. Kinjikitile claimed to have communicated with the deity Bokera through the spirit Hongo. He encouraged his followers to overlook tribal differences and unite against the Germans. Kinjitkile's reputation grew rapidly, drawing followers from the 100,000 square kilometers the territory encompassed. He told his followers that their ancestors had commanded him to lead a rebellion against the German colonial empire. This helped start the Maji Maji Rebellion. His leadership was successful in uniting peoples of separate ethnic groups in German East Africa in a single movement against colonial rule, which is claimed as the first predecessor of a shared Tanzanian national identity. Kinjikitile gave his people 'holy water' (Swahili: maji) – consisting of water mixed with millet and castor oil – claiming that it would protect them from German bullets. His followers wore millet stalks around their foreheads, and were equipped with an arsenal that included cap guns, spears and arrows. The rebellion is considered to have begun on 20 July 1905, with the symbolic destruction of a cotton field worked with forced labour. After a group of Matumbi people attacked the home of a local official in July 1905, Kinjikitile was arrested by German troops.

He was hanged for treason on 4 August 1905. His brother continued Kinjikitile's work and the rebellion continued until 1907, with over 100,000 or 200,000–300,000 Africans killed in the German suppression of the revolt. Present-day Tanzanians consider the failed rebellion to have been the first stirring of nationalism, and Kinjikitile "Bokero" Ngwale a proto-national hero.

== Reception ==
In 1969, Tanzanian playwright Ebrahim Hussein wrote a popular play in Swahili language entitled Kinjeketile, based on the Maji Maji Rebellion.
