= Max Looff =

German naval officer

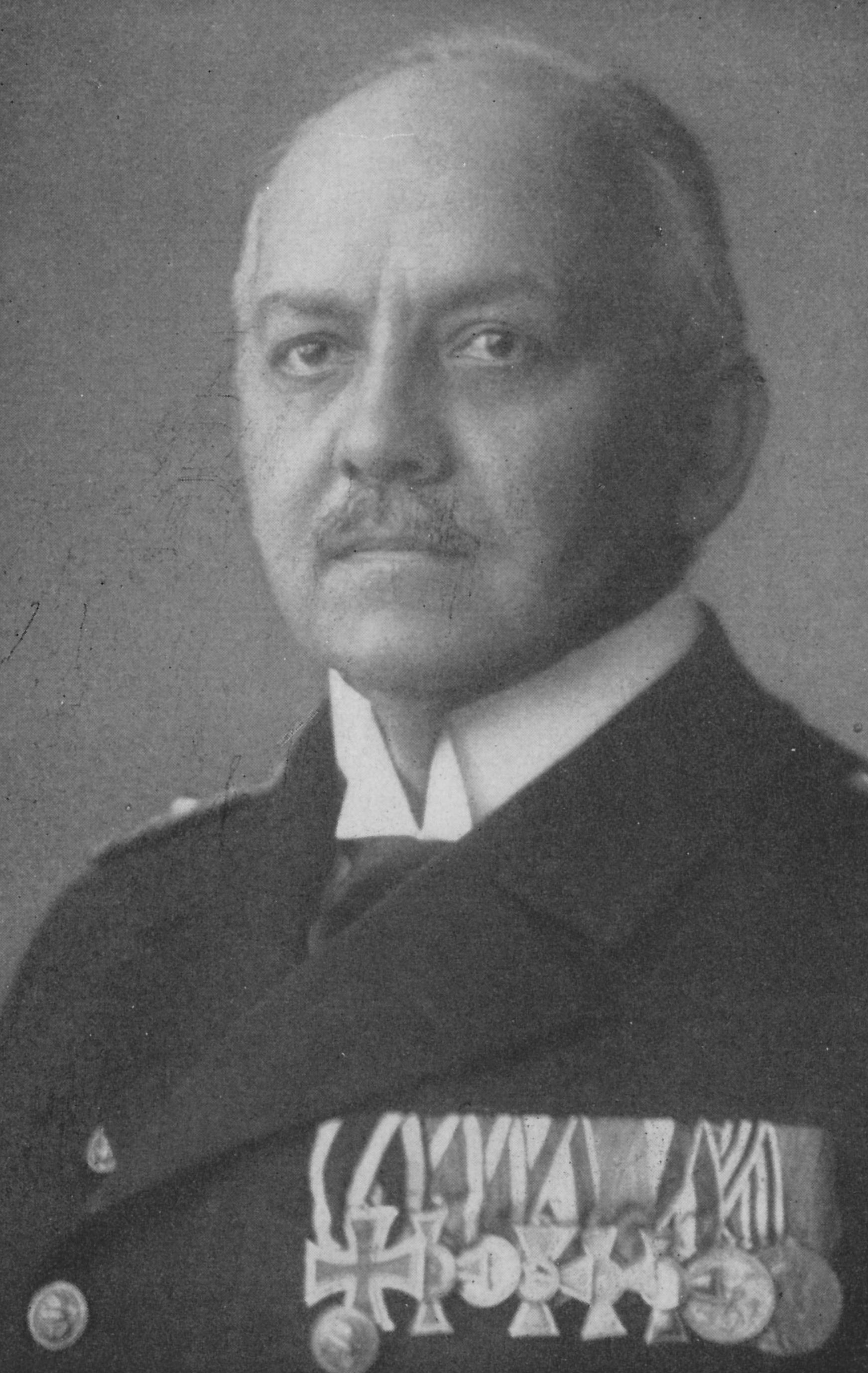
- Born: 2 May 1874; Strasbourg, German Empire
- Died: 20 September 1954 (aged 80); Berlin, East Germany
- Military career
- Allegiance: German Empire (1891–1918); Weimar Republic (1918-1922); Nazi Germany (1939)
- Branch: Imperial German Navy; Reichsmarine (to 1922); Kriegsmarine
- Service years: 1891–1922, 1939
- Rank: Vizeadmiral
- Commands: SMS Königsberg
- Conflicts: World War I East African Campaign Battle of Zanzibar Battle of Rufiji Delta
- Awards: Order of the Red Eagle; Order of the Crown; Iron Cross
- Other work: Military writer

Max Looff (2 May 1874 – 20 September 1954) was a naval officer of the Imperial German Navy, who reached the rank of Vizeadmiral and later a military writer. Looff commanded the cruiser SMS Königsberg during the Battle of Rufiji Delta before it was sunk by two Royal Navy monitors, HMS Mersey and Severn on 11 July 1915.

== Early career ==
Looff was born on 2 May 1874 in Strasbourg. He entered the Imperial German Navy on 10 April 1891 and was assigned to the Bismarck-class corvette SMS Stosch, where he attended basic training. He was subsequently transferred to the Naval Academy in Kiel, where he finished his training on 11 April 1892 and was promoted to the rank Seekadett on the same date.

== World War I ==
Looff was appointed in command of Königsberg on 1 April 1914 and remained in command until the ship was scuttled in the Rufiji Delta in July 1915 after protracted artillery exchanges with British monitors. He later joined Paul von Lettow-Vorbeck in his guerilla campaign, and after the Battle of Mahiwa, was put in command of the German wounded and surrendered to the British when instructed to do so.

== Later life ==
Max Looff was recalled to the Kriegsmarine service with the rank of Vizeadmiral on 24 May 1939, but remained in the reserve status for the duration of the War. Looff continued in his work and published the book about the combats in German East Africa, "Tufani" in 1941.

After the end of World War II, Looff remained in the Soviet occupation zone of the Berlin and thus his published work had been placed on the list of forbidden literature by the Communist regime.

Vizeadmiral Max Looff died on 20 September 1954 in Berlin, East Germany aged 80 years.

== Military decorations ==
- Prussian Order of the Red Eagle 4th Class
- Prussian Order of the Crown 4th Class
- Prussian Centenary Medal
- Prussian Lifesaving Medal
- Prussian Service Cross
- Prussian Iron Cross (1914) 1st and 2nd Class
- Hanseatic Cross of Hamburg
- Colonial Medal
- China Commemorative Medal with Clasps for Yaku, Peitang-Forts and Liang-Hsiang-Hsien
- The Honour Cross of the World War 1914/1918
- Iron Cross First and Second class
