= 13th Division (German Empire) =

13th Division (13. Division); in 1870-71 and from August 2, 1914, 13th Infantry Division (13. Infanterie-Division)
- Active: 1818-1919
- Country: Prussia/Germany
- Branch: Army
- Type: Infantry (in peacetime included cavalry)
- Size: Approx. 15,000
- Part of: VII. Army Corps (VII. Armeekorps)
- Garrison/HQ: Münster in Westphalia
- Engagements: Second Schleswig War: Dybbøl, Als Austro-Prussian War: Main River campaign Franco-Prussian War: Colombey, Gravelotte, Metz World War I: 1st Marne, Verdun, Somme (1916), German spring offensive, Somme (1918), Meuse-Argonne Offensive

Commanders
- Notable commanders: Friedrich Graf von Wrangel, August Karl von Goeben, Friedrich Sixt von Armin, Hermann von François, Kurt von dem Borne, Rudolf von Borries, Peter von Kameke

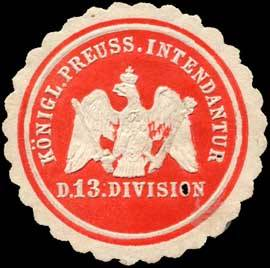
Sealing stamp, Royal Prussian Intendancy of the 13th Division

The 13th Division (13. Division) was a unit of the Prussian/German Army. It was formed in November 1816 in Münster in Westphalia as a troop brigade and became the 13th Division on September 5, 1818. The division was subordinated in peacetime to the VII Army Corps (VII. Armeekorps). The division was disbanded in 1919 during the demobilization of the German Army after World War I. The division was recruited primarily in the Prussian Province of Westphalia and two small principalities in the Westphalian region, Lippe-Detmold and Schaumburg-Lippe.

== Combat chronicle ==
The 13th Division served in the Second Schleswig War against Denmark in 1864, seeing action in the war's major battles: the Battle of Dybbøl (also called the Battle of the Düppeler Heights) and the Battle of Als. The division then fought in the Austro-Prussian War in 1866, where it was part of the Army of the Main (Main-Armee) and saw action in the engagements against Austria's south German allies, including the siege of the Bavarian fortress at Würzburg. In the Franco-Prussian War of 1870–71, the division fought in several battles and engagements, including the Battle of Borny-Colombey, also called the Battle of Colombey-Nouilly, and the Gravelotte, or Gravelotte-St. Privat, and the Siege of Metz.

In World War I, the division served on the Western Front. It participated in the initial German drive through Belgium and France, culminating in the First Battle of the Marne. After a period of trench warfare in various parts of the line, the division went to Verdun in 1916. Later that year, beginning in September, the division saw action in the later phases of the Battle of the Somme. During the 1918 German spring offensive, the division fought in the Second Battle of the Somme. The division bore the brunt of later Allied offensives, including the Meuse-Argonne Offensive. Allied intelligence rated it a first class division.

== Order of battle in the Franco-Prussian War ==
During wartime, the 13th Division, like other regular German divisions, was redesignated an infantry division. The organization of the 13th Infantry Division in 1870 at the beginning of the Franco-Prussian War was as follows:

- 25. Infanterie Brigade
  - Infanterie-Regiment Nr. 13
  - Füsilier-Regiment Nr. 73
- 26. Infanterie Brigade
  - Infanterie-Regiment Nr. 15
  - Infanterie-Regiment Nr. 55
- Jäger-Bataillon Nr. 7
- Husaren-Regiment Nr. 8

== Pre-World War I organization ==
German divisions underwent various organizational changes after the Franco-Prussian War. The organization of the 13th Division in 1914, shortly before the outbreak of World War I, was as follows:

- 25. Infanterie Brigade
  - Infanterie-Regiment Herwath von Bittenfeld (1. Westfälisches) Nr. 13
  - 7. Lothringisches Infanterie-Regiment Nr. 158
- 26. Infanterie Brigade
  - Infanterie-Regiment Prinz Friedrich der Niederlande (2. Westfälisches) Nr. 15
  - Infanterie-Regiment Graf Bülow von Dennewitz (6. Westfälisches) Nr. 55
- 13. Kavallerie-Brigade
  - Kürassier-Regiment von Driesen (Westfälisches) Nr. 4
  - Husaren-Regiment Kaiser Nikolaus II. von Rußland (1. Westfälisches) Nr. 8
- 13. Feldartillerie-Brigade
  - 2. Westfälisches Feldartillerie-Regiment Nr. 22
  - Mindensches Feldartillerie-Regiment Nr. 58
- Landwehr-Inspektion Dortmund

== Order of battle on mobilization ==
On mobilization in August 1914 at the beginning of World War I, most divisional cavalry, including brigade headquarters, was withdrawn to form cavalry divisions or split up among divisions as reconnaissance units. Divisions received engineer companies and other support units from their higher headquarters. The 13th Division was again renamed the 13th Infantry Division. Its initial wartime organization was as follows:

- 25. Infanterie-Brigade:
  - Infanterie-Regiment Herwarth von Bittenfeld (1. Westfälisches) Nr. 13
  - 7. Lothringisches Infanterie-Regiment Nr. 158
- 26.Infanterie-Brigade:
  - Infanterie-Regiment Prinz Friedrich der Niederlande (2. Westfälisches) Nr. 15
  - Infanterie-Regiment Graf Bülow von Dennewitz (6. Westfälisches) Nr. 55
  - Westfälisches Jäger-Bataillon Nr. 7
- Stab u. 3.Eskadron/Ulanen-Regiment Hennigs von Treffenfeld (Altmärkisches) Nr. 16
- 13. Feldartillerie-Brigade:
  - 2. Westfälisches Feldartillerie-Regiment Nr. 22
  - Mindensches Feldartillerie-Regiment Nr. 58
- 1. Kompanie/Westfälisches Pionier-Bataillon Nr. 7

== Late World War I organization ==
Divisions underwent many changes during the war, with regiments moving from division to division, and some being destroyed and rebuilt. During the war, most divisions became triangular - one infantry brigade with three infantry regiments rather than two infantry brigades of two regiments (a "square division"). An artillery commander replaced the artillery brigade headquarters, the cavalry was further reduced, the engineer contingent was increased, and a divisional signals command was created. The 13th Infantry Division's order of battle on March 8, 1918, was as follows:

- 26. Infanterie-Brigade:
  - Infanterie-Regiment Herwarth von Bittenfeld (1. Westfälisches) Nr. 13
  - Infanterie-Regiment Prinz Friedrich der Niederlande (2. Westfälisches) Nr. 15
  - Infanterie-Regiment Graf Bülow von Dennewitz (6. Westfälisches) Nr. 55
  - Maschinengewehr-Scharfschützen-Abteilung Nr. 22
- 3.Eskadron/Ulanen-Regiment Hennigs von Treffenfeld (Altmärkisches) Nr. 16
- Artillerie-Kommandeur 13:
  - Mindensches Feldartillerie-Regiment Nr. 58
  - Fußartillerie-Bataillon Nr. 157
- Westfälisches Pionier-Bataillon Nr. 7
- Divisions-Nachrichten-Kommandeur 13
