= Maji Maji Rebellion =

Uprising in the south and east of German East Africa, 1905–1907

- Part of Scramble for Africa
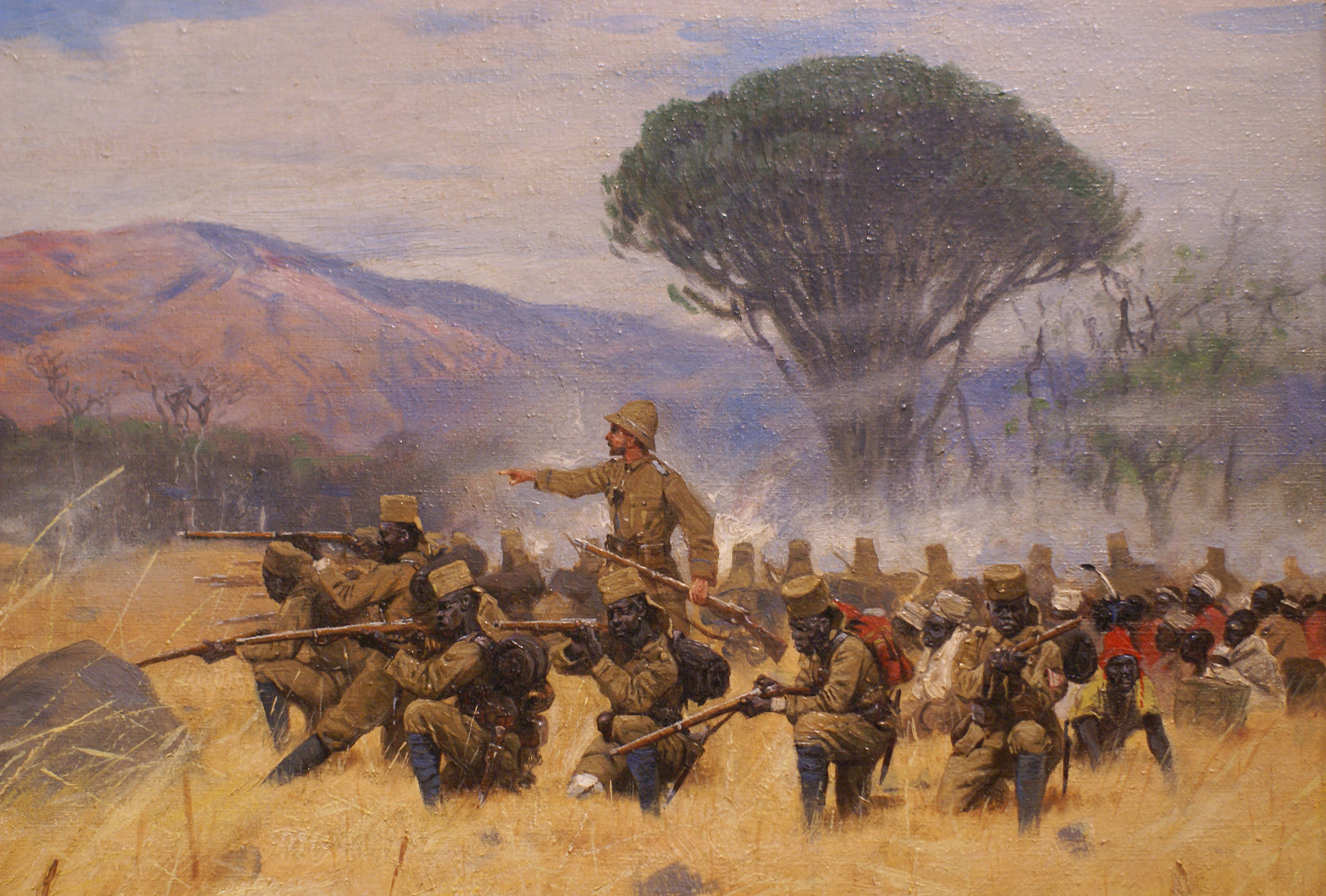
- Battle of Mahenge; Wilhelm Kuhnert, 1908
Date	July 1905 – August 1907
Location	German East Africa (modern-day Tanzania)
Result	German victory

Belligerents
(German Empire) Germany: German East Africa	Qadiriyya Brotherhood Matumbi, Ngindo, Ngoni, Yao tribes other Tanganyikans

Commanders and leaders
(German Empire) G.A. von Götzen; (German Empire) Kurt Johannes; (German Empire) F. W. von Lindeiner-Wildau	Kinjekitile Ngwale (executed); Nasr Khalfan; Hemedi Muhammad

Strength
c. 2,000	c. 90,000

Casualties and losses
15 Germans, 73 askari, and 316 ruga ruga	75,000–300,000 total dead by famine, disease, and violence

The Maji Maji Rebellion (German: Maji-Maji-Aufstand, Swahili: Vita vya Maji Maji) was an armed rebellion of Africans against German colonial rule in German East Africa (modern-day Tanzania). The war was triggered by German colonial policies designed to force the indigenous population to grow cotton for export. The war lasted from 1905 to 1907, during which 75,000 to 300,000 died, overwhelmingly from famine. The end of the war was followed by a period of famine, known as the Great Hunger (ukame), caused in large part by the scorched-earth policies used by governor Gustav Adolf von Götzen to suppress the rebellion. These tactics have been described by scholars as genocidal. The name may have been the origin of the term for the 'Mau Mau rebellion' in Kenya five decades later.

== Causes ==
After the Scramble for Africa among the major European powers in the 1880s, Germany reinforced its hold on several formal African colonies. These were German East Africa (Tanzania, Rwanda, Burundi, and part of Mozambique), German Southwest Africa (present-day Namibia), Cameroon, and Togoland (today split between Ghana and Togo).

The Germans had a relatively weak hold on German East Africa. However, they maintained a system of forts throughout the interior of the territory and were able to exert some control over it. Since their hold on the colony was weak, they resorted to using violently repressive tactics to control the population.

Germany levied head taxes in 1898 and relied heavily on forced labour to build roads and accomplish various other tasks. In 1902, governor of German East Africa, Gustav Adolf von Götzen ordered villages to grow cotton as a cash crop for export. Each village was charged with producing a quota of cotton, despite the fact that the high water requirements of cotton made it impossible to grow in most of the country. The headmen of the village were put in charge of overseeing the production, which set them against the rest of the population. The German government also introduced laws to protect forests and wildlife. While these measures may have been desirable in theory, they led to great hardship for the African population, not least because of an increase in wild pigs, which did enormous damage to food crops.

The German policies were very unpopular, as they had serious effects on the lives of local peoples. The social fabric of society was rapidly changing: as the roles of men and women were being changed, they had to adapt for the communities. Since men were forced away from their homes to work, women had to take on some of the traditional male roles. Also, the men's absence strained the resources of the village, and the people's ability to deal with their environment and remain self sufficient. In 1905, a drought threatened the region. All that, as well as opposition to the government's agricultural and labour policies, led to open rebellion against the Germans in July.

In the aftermath of the rebellion, Governor von Götzen initiated an inquiry into the causes of the rebellion. Sunseri has summarised the results of the inquiry as follows:

Ultimately members of the commission disagreed on the nature of the uprising, dividing between those who saw it as an irrational movement spawned by sorcerers and headmen making use of maji water medicine, disgruntled because they had been steadily losing influence since the advent of colonial rule, and those who dismissed the role of spirit mediums and emphasized the burdens created by German administration. The governor's circle cultivated the image of an atavistic, superstitious movement rooted in traditional beliefs so as to insulate their policies from close scrutiny.

In 1909 Götzen published a history of the rebellion. John Iliffe has said of this work that it is "remarkable for containing no reference whatever to the cotton scheme which the author had initiated," and he calls it "an account of atavistic conspiracy."

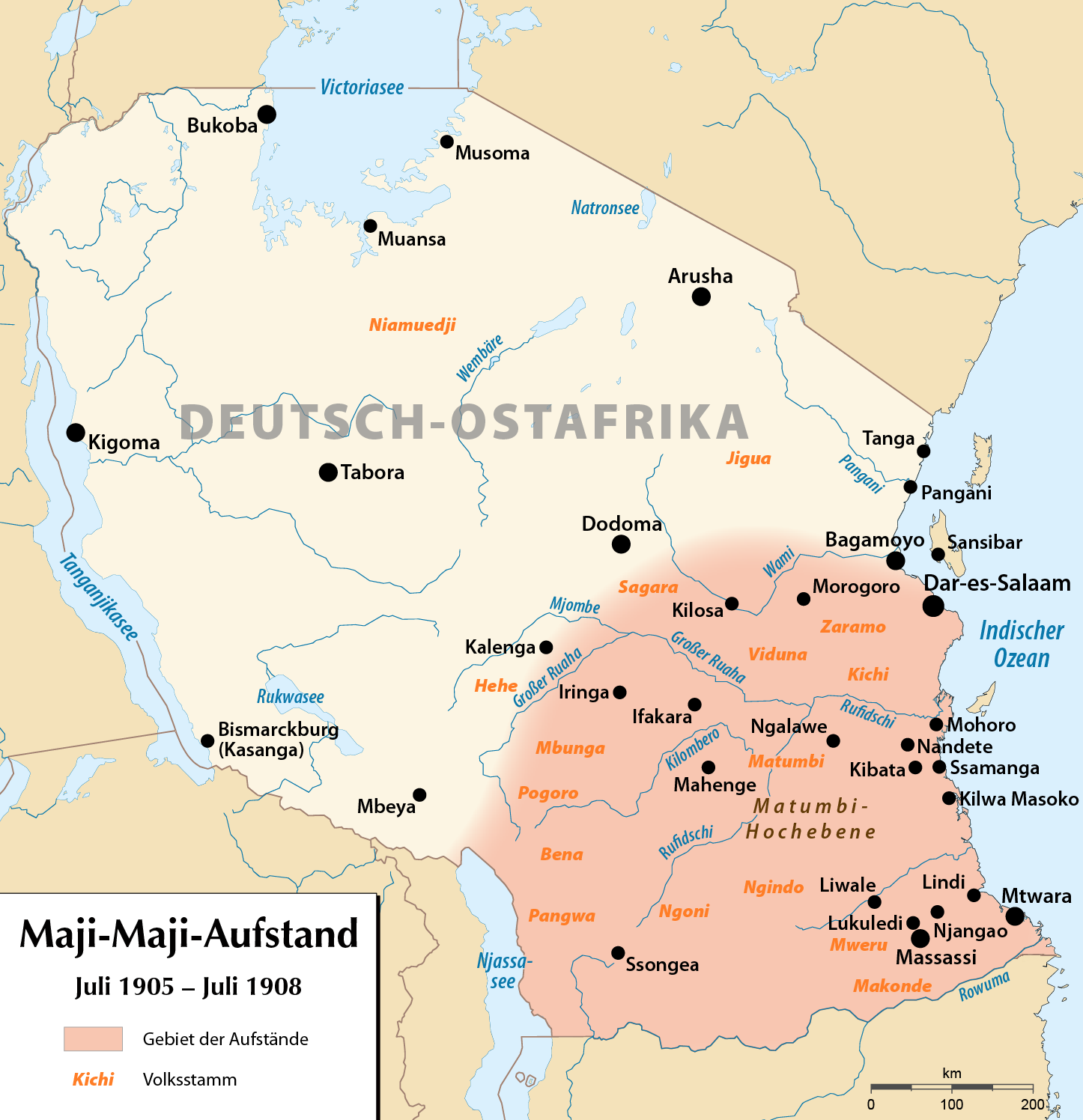
Map of German East Africa with the areas affected by the rebellion highlighted in red.

== Uprising ==
The insurgents turned to magic to drive out the German colonizers and used it as a unifying force in the rebellion. A spirit medium named Kinjikitile Ngwale, who practiced folk Islam that incorporated animist beliefs, claimed to be possessed by a snake spirit called Hongo. Ngwale began calling himself Bokero and developed a belief that the people of East Africa had been called upon to eliminate the Germans. German anthropologists recorded that he gave his followers war medicine that would turn German bullets into water. This "war medicine" was in fact water (maji in Kiswahili) mixed with castor oil and millet seeds. Emboldened with this new liquid, Bokero's followers began what would become known as the Maji Maji Rebellion.

The followers of Bokero's movement were poorly armed with spears and arrows, sometimes poisoned. However, they were numerous and believed that they could not be harmed because the Germans' bullets would turn to water. They marched from their villages wearing millet stalks around their foreheads. Initially, they attacked small outposts and damaged cotton plants. On 31 July 1905, Matumbi tribesmen marched on Samanga and destroyed the cotton crop as well as a trading post. Kinjikitile was arrested and hanged for treason. Before his execution, he declared that he had spread the medicine of the rebellion throughout the region. On 14 August 1905, Ngindo tribesmen attacked a small party of missionaries on a safari; all five, including Bishop Spiss (the Roman Catholic Bishop of Dar es Salaam) were speared to death.

Soon the Yao tribes started participating and throughout August the rebels moved from the Matumbi Hills in the southern part of what is now Tanzania and attacked German garrisons throughout the colony. The attack on Ifakara, on 16 August, destroyed the small German garrison and opened the way to the key fortification at Mahenge. Though the southern garrison was quite small (there were but 458 European and 588 native soldiers in the entire area), their fortifications and modern weapons gave them an advantage. At Mahenge, several thousand Maji Maji warriors (led by another spirit medium; not Bokero) marched on the German cantonment, which was defended by Lieutenant Theodor von Hassel with sixty native soldiers, a few hundred loyal tribesmen, and two machine guns. The two attacking tribes disagreed on when to attack and were unable to co-ordinate. The first attack was met with gunfire from 1000 meters; the tribesmen stood firm for about fifteen minutes, then broke and retreated. After the first attack, a second column of 1,200 men advanced from the east. Some of these attackers were able to get within three paces of the firing line before they were killed.

While this was the apex of the uprising, the Ngoni people decided to join in the revolt with a force of 5,000. The Gwangara Ngoni were relatively recent arrivals in the region, descendants of a remnant of the Ndwandwe confederation defeated by the Zulus in 1818 (other Ngoni states were formed in Malawi, Zambia, and north-central Tanzania). German troops, armed with machine guns, departed from Mahenge to the Ngoni camp, which they attacked on 21 October. The Ngoni soldiers retreated, throwing away their bottles of war medicine and crying, "The maji is a lie!" Upon the outbreak of the fighting, Count Gustav Adolf von Götzen, governor of German East Africa, had requested reinforcements from the German government. Kaiser Wilhelm immediately ordered two cruisers with their Marine complements to the troubled colony. Reinforcements also arrived from as far away as New Guinea. When 1,000 regular soldiers from Germany arrived in October, Götzen felt he could go on the offensive and restore order in the south.

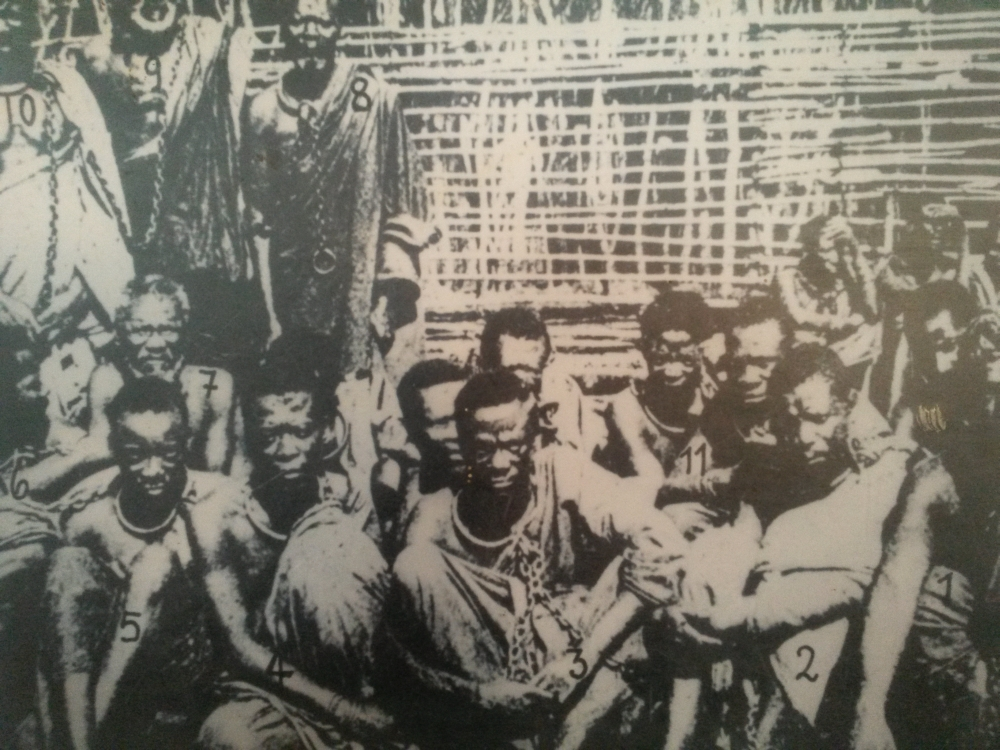
Maji Maji warriors before hanging in February 1906

Three columns moved into the rebellious South. They destroyed villages, crops, and other food sources used by the rebels. They made effective use of their firepower to break up rebel attacks. A successful ambush of a German column crossing the Rufiji River by the Bena kept the rebellion alive in the southwest, but the Germans were not denied for long. By April 1906, the southwest had been pacified. However, elsewhere the fighting was bitter. A column under Lieutenant Gustav von Blumenthal (1879–1913, buried at Lindi) consisting of himself, one other European and 46 Askaris fell under continuous attack as it marched in early May 1906, from Songea to Mahenge. The Germans decided to concentrate at Kitanda, where Major Kurt Johannes, Lieutenants von Blumenthal and Friedrich Wilhelm von Lindeiner-Wildau eventually gathered. Von Blumenthal was then sent along the Luwegu River, partly by boat. The southeast campaign degenerated into a guerrilla war that brought with it a devastating famine.

The German scorched earth policy deliberately caused famine among the population. Von Götzen was willing to pardon the common soldiers who gave up their weapons, leaders and traditional healers. However, he also needed to flush out the remaining rebels and so chose famine. In 1905, one of the leaders of German troops in the colony, Captain Wangenheim, wrote to von Götzen, "Only hunger and want can bring about a final submission. Military actions alone will remain more or less a drop in the ocean." Germany's tactics have been described as genocidal by scholars such as A. Dirk Moses and Klaus Bachmann.

Not until August 1907 were the last embers of rebellion extinguished. In its wake, the rebellion had left 15 Germans, 73 askaris, 316 ruga ruga, and tens or even hundreds of thousands of insurgents and local civilians dead.

== Aftermath and interpretation ==
The Abushiri revolt of 1888–1889 and the Wahehe Rebellion of 1891–1898 are viewed by historians as precursors of the Maji Maji uprising. The suppression of the Maji Maji people changed the history of southern Tanzania. Tens, perhaps hundreds, of thousands of people died or were displaced from their homes. In the wake of the war, the imperial government instituted administrative reforms under the governorship of Albrecht von Rechenberg. The rebellion became a focal point in the history of the region. Journalist John Gunther noted in 1953 that "even today the Southern Province of Tanganyika, the 'Cinderella Province,' has not fully recovered from the German terror half a century ago. The economy of the region has never been successfully rebuilt." Later Tanzanian nationalists used it as an example of the first stirrings of Tanzanian nationalism, a unifying experience that brought together all the different peoples of Tanzania under one leader, in an attempt to establish a nation free from foreign domination.

Later historians have challenged that view and claimed that the rebellion cannot be seen as a unified movement but rather a series of revolts conducted for a wide range of reasons, including religion. The Ngoni chiefs were offered Christian baptism before execution. Many people in the area itself saw the revolt as one part of a longer series of wars continuing since long before the arrival of Germans in the region. They cite the alliance of some groups with the Germans to further their own agendas.

The role of Islam in the rebellion is a matter for debate. In a recent review of the evidence, Jörg Haustein concludes that the contention that Islam was a factor "is not warranted by historical sources and established scholarship about the Maji Maji War."

John Iliffe interprets the rebellion as a "mass movement [which] originated in peasant grievances, was then sanctified and extended by prophetic religion, and finally crumbled as crisis compelled reliance on fundamental loyalties to kin and tribe". Patrick Redmond describes the rebellion as "Tanzania's most spectacular manifestation of the rejection of colonial rule" but which had only a "slight chance of success".

=== Reception in the 21st century ===
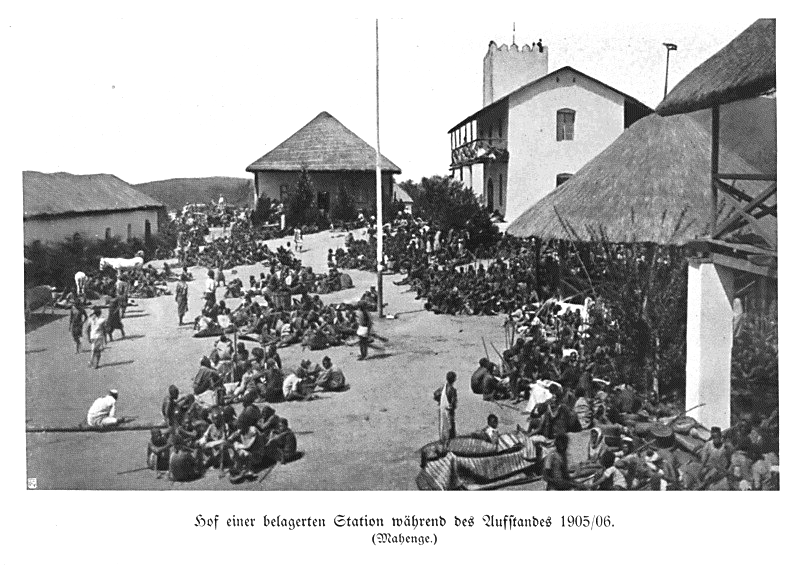
Courtyard of the beleaguered Mahenge Boma during the Majimaji War 1905/1906

The Majimaji War was extensively studied by Tanzanian historians at Dar es Salaam University College in the late 1960s and 1970s. In the 21st century, historical and archaeological studies have been conducted with new questions and methods relating to this colonial war. These new approaches have been critical of previous studies for neglecting groups outside of male leadership, and have sought to pay more attention to groups such as "women, the majority of men who lacked political power, so-called ‘loyalists’ such as Christians, askari [African policemen or soldiers] in German military and their rugaruga auxiliaries, and the many uncommitted villagers, who knew only terror and victimization during the war." In particular, such studies have used historical photographs such as the portrait of Chief Songea Lwafu Mbano exhibited in the Majimaji Memorial Museum, Songea, and a beleaguered German fortification as documents of visual history to provide new information about the war.

Thus, the 2018 scholarly study Look at Majimaji! A plea for historical photographs in Tanzania examined the role of historical photographs in commemorating the Majimaji rebellion: Historical images of the Majimaji War are widely used in museums, books, websites, and family collections to visually convey the war’s history. Despite their prominence in public commemoration, Majimaji photographs remain largely unexplored as historical sources. The authors argue that analyzing these photographs can yield fresh insights and raise new research questions about the war and its remembrance. Some of these insights referred to the visual information in images that highlight aspects of the conflict often ignored in written records, such as daily life, preparations for resistance, and the visual strategies of colonial rule. Further, the study argued that photographs capture the roles of individuals and communities, shedding light on leaders, fighters, and civilians whose experiences are rarely documented in official reports.

== See also ==
- Chief Mkwawa
- Herero Wars
  - Herero and Nama genocide
