= Looff Hippodrome =

A Looff Hippodrome was a building that housed one of the hand-carved carousels created by Charles I. D. Looff or his heirs. A hippodrome was a horse or chariot race course in Ancient Greece, from the Greek words hippos (ἵππος; "horse") and dromos (δρόμος; "course").

- Looff Hippodrome in Long Beach, California
- Looff Hippodrome in San Francisco, California
- Looff Hippodrome in Santa Monica, California
