= Centenary Medal (Prussia) =

Centenary Medal Zentenarmedaille
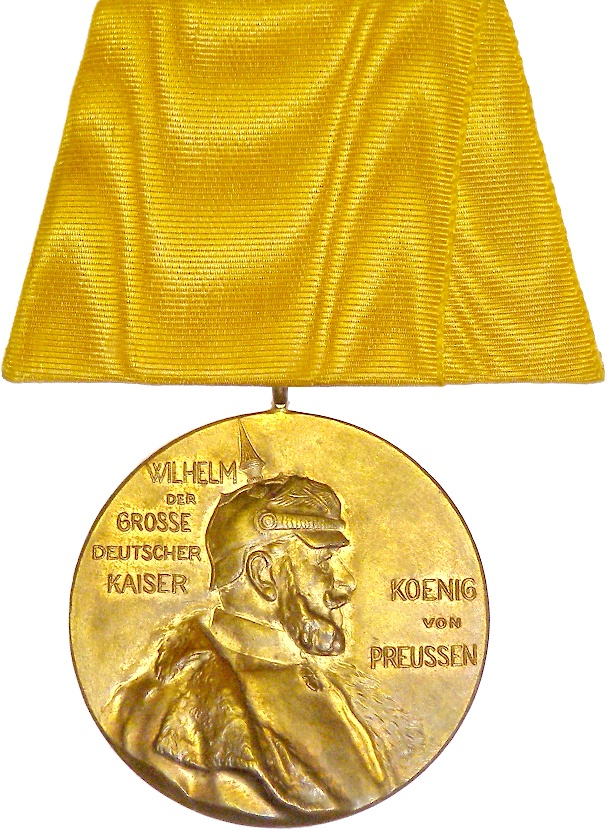
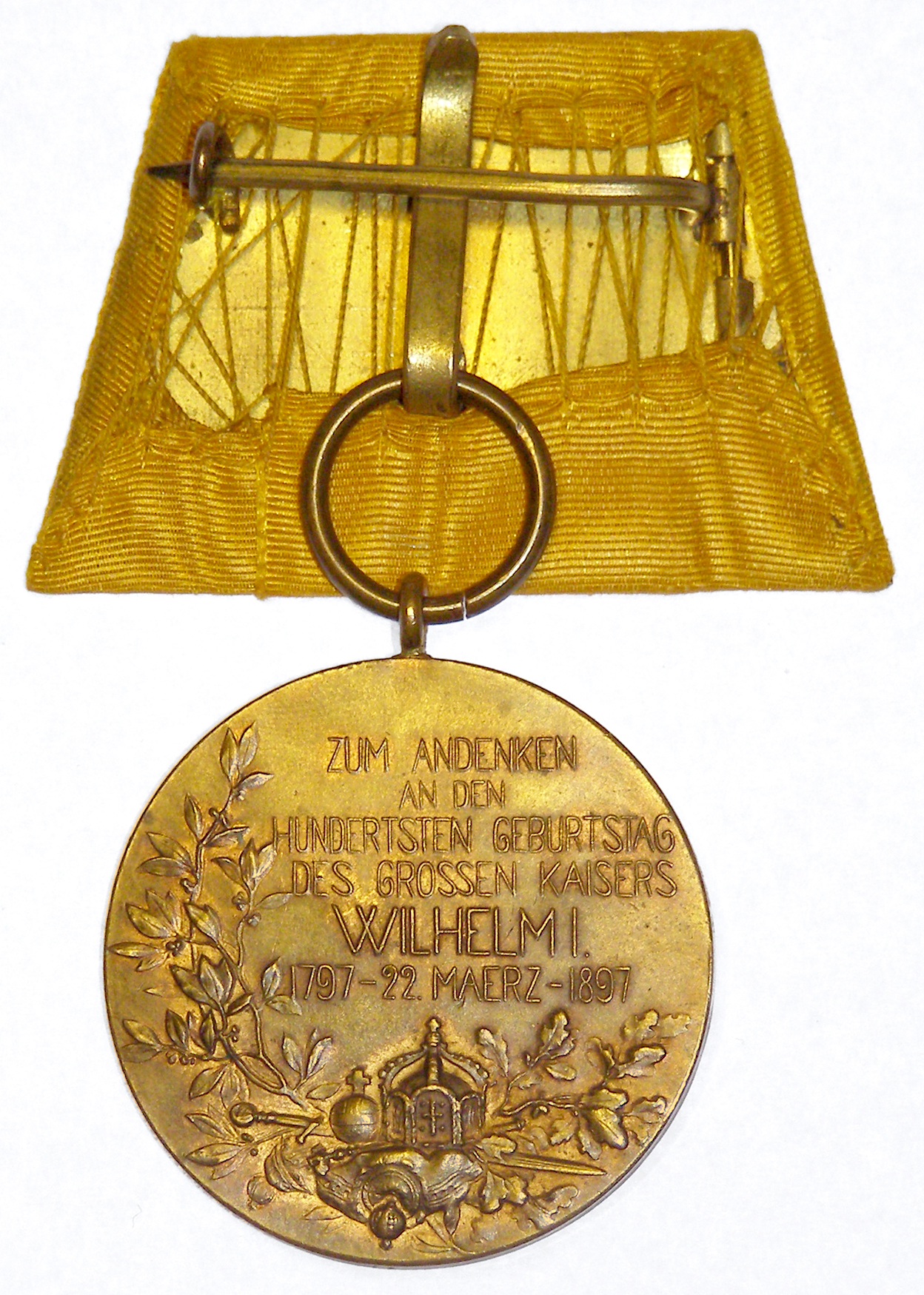
- Obverse and reverse of the medal
- Type: Commemorative medal
- Awarded for: To commemorate the hundredth anniversary of the birth of Wilhelm I
- Presented by: Prussia
- Eligibility: Prussian military and civilian personnel, as well as living veterans of past unification wars
- Established: 22 March 1897

Order of Wear 1916
- Next (higher): 1861 Coronation Medal
- Next (lower): Electoral Hesse Jubilee Medals

The Kaiser Wilhelm Memorial Medal also known as the Centenary Medal (German: Kaiser-Wilhelm-Erinnerungsmedaille Zentenarmedaille) was established on March 22, 1897, by Wilhelm II on the occasion of the 100th Birthday of his grandfather, Emperor Wilhelm I.

The medal was awarded by Prussia to state and university officials, as well as all military officers, non-commissioned officers and enlisted personnel, which were actively serving in army, navy and Schutztruppe. Medals were also awarded to the surviving veterans of the First Schleswig War, Second Schleswig War, Austro-Prussian War, and the Franco-Prussian War.

== Appearance ==
The medal is made of bronze gunmetal from captured cannon. It is 40 mm in diameter and was suspended from a ribbon 36 mm wide.

The obverse is a right facing effigy of Wilhelm I in military uniform wearing a mantle and Pickelhaube. To the left of the effigy is the inscription WILHELM / DER / GROSSE / DEUTSCHER / KAISER (William the Great German Emperor). To the right is KOENIG / VON / PREUSSEN (King of Prussia).

The reverse depicts symbols of royal authority including the German State Crown, an orb, sword, and scepter placed upon a pillow surrounded by oak leaves, in the lower half of the medal. To the left is an upward climbing laurel branch. In the upper half is the inscription in six lines ZUM ANDENKEN AN DEN HUNDERTSTEN GEBURTSTAG DES GROSSEN KAISERS WILHELM I. 1797 22.MAERZ 1897 (IN MEMORY OF THE HUNDREDTH BIRTHDAY THE GREAT EMPEROR WILHELM I. 1797–MARCH 22–1897).
