= German State Crown =

Model of a crown for the German Empire

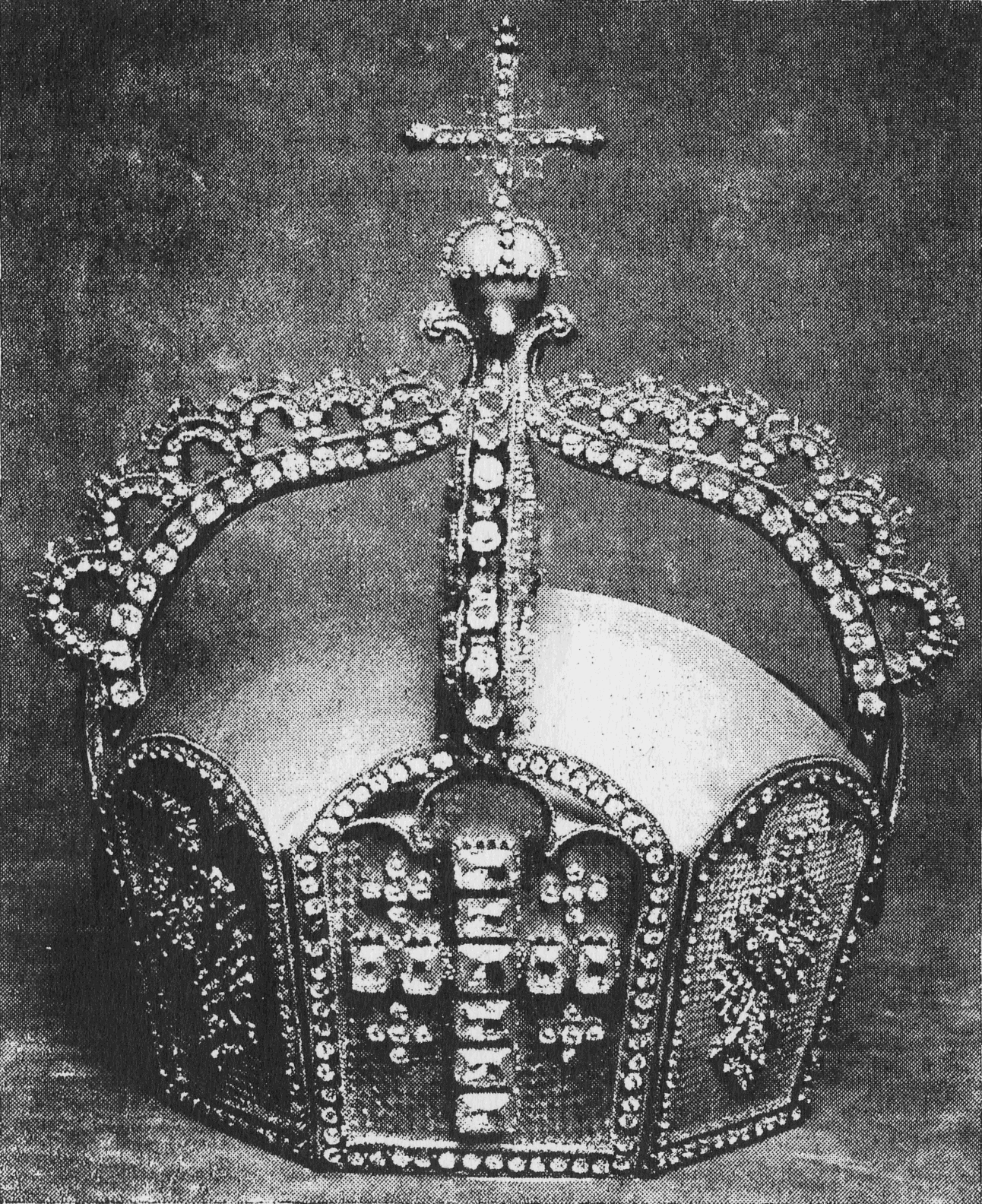
Wooden model of the Imperial Crown

In 1871 a design and a model for a new state crown (German: Staatskrone) were created to reflect the new German Empire. The model was based upon the Crown of the Holy Roman Empire and was kept in the Hohenzollern museum at Schloss Monbijou in Berlin, until it disappeared during World War II. It has never re-surfaced. No final crown was ever made. However, the design was used as a heraldic device for the German Kaisers from 1871 until Kaiser Wilhelm's abdication in 1918. The crown was most used as an heraldic symbol, in the German coat of arms and the Emperor's personal standard.

A drawing of the crown is used as an emblem by a German monarchist group called "Tradition und Leben" ("tradition and life").

Crowns for the Empress and Crown Prince were also designed and wooden models made.

The Imperial Crown in heraldic representation

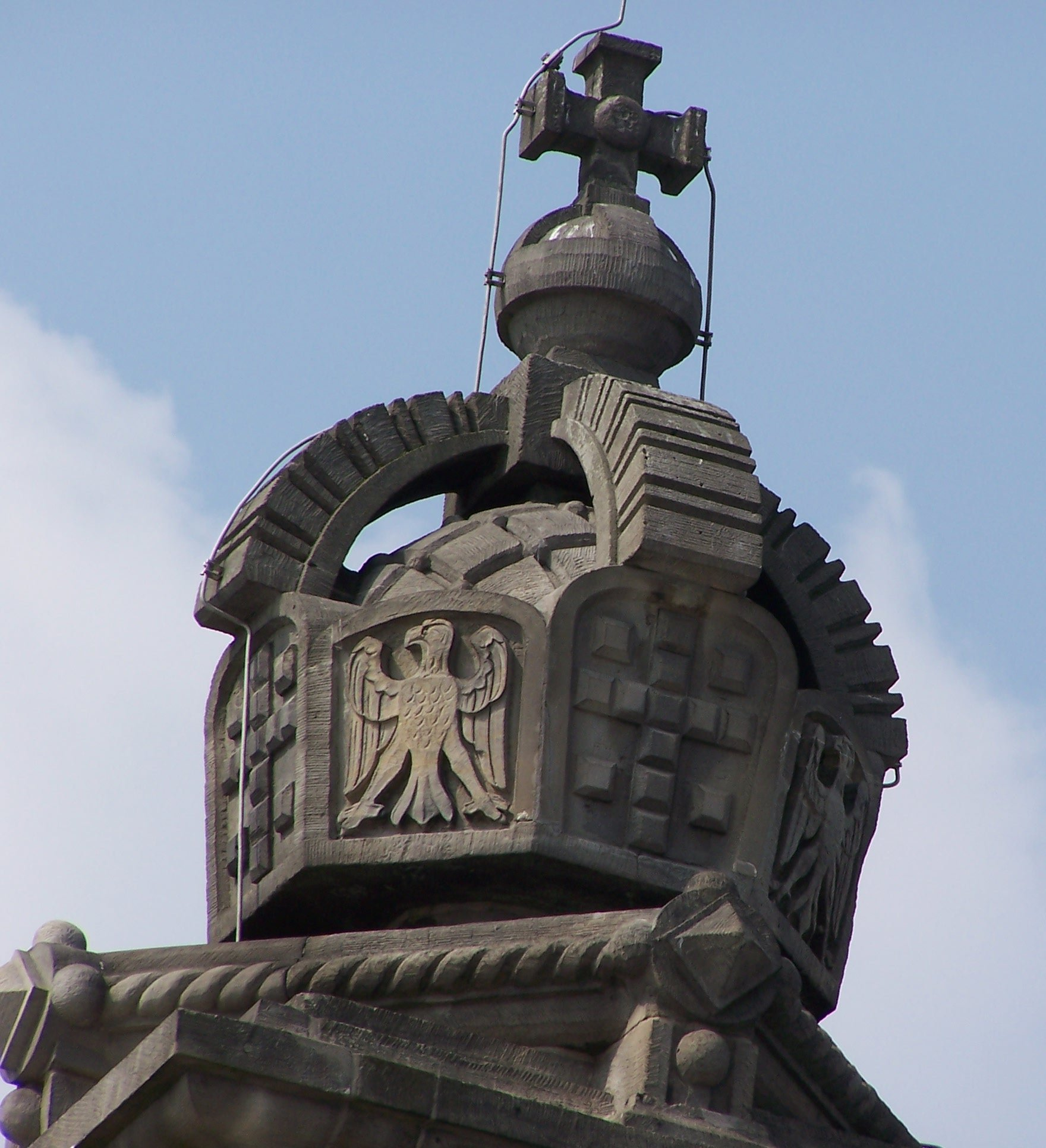
Model on the roof of the Reichstag Building

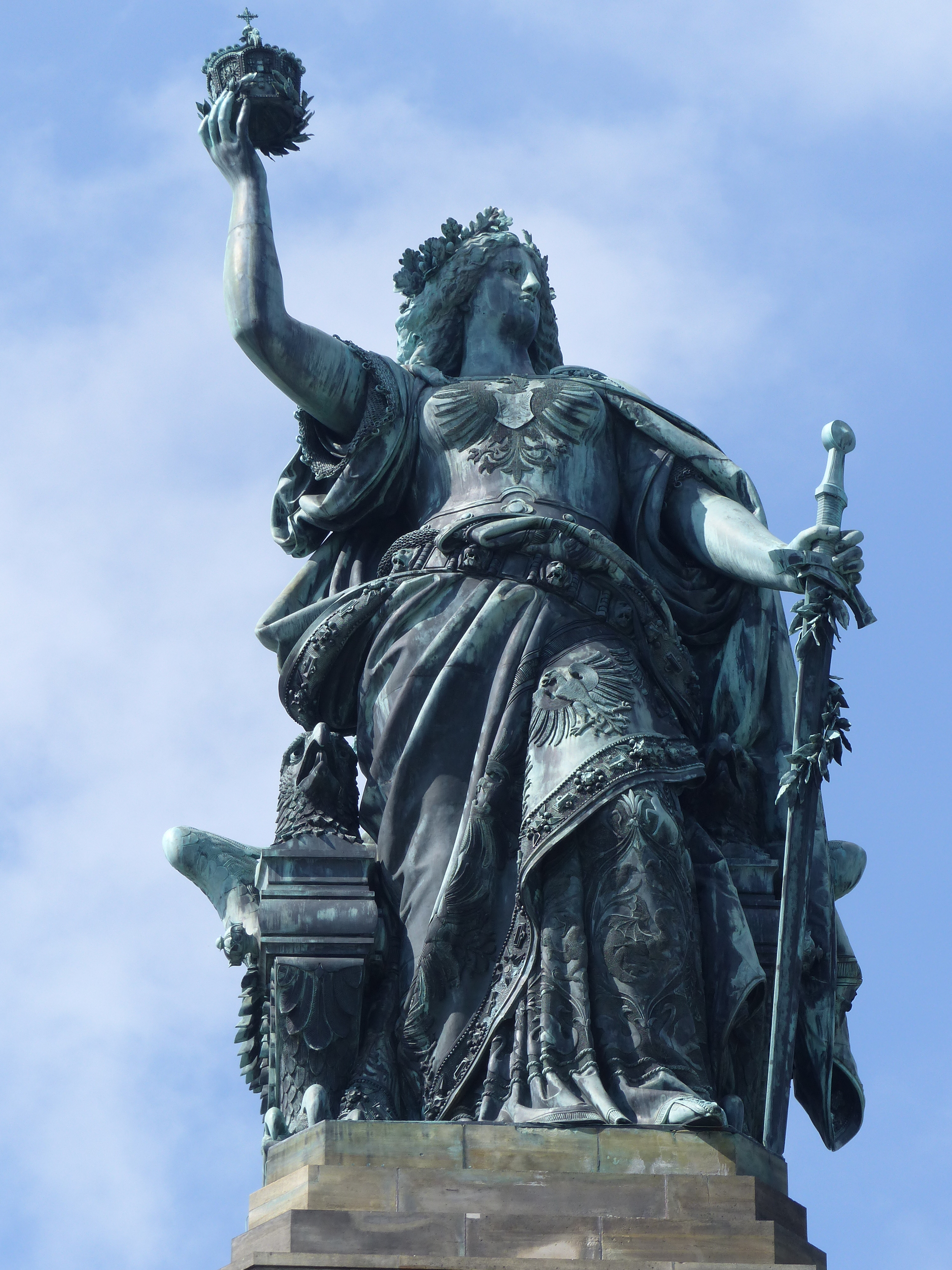
Germania holding the Imperial Crown atop the Niederwald monument

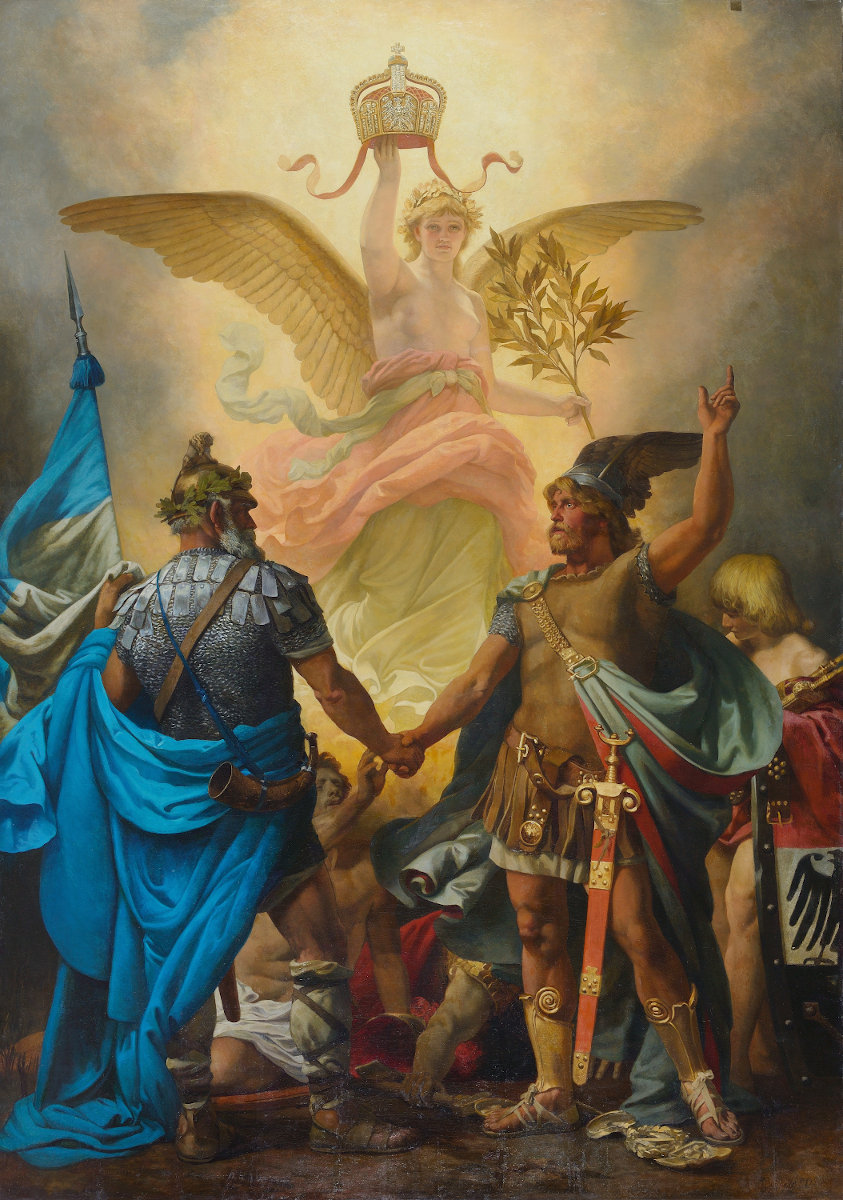
Victoria holding the Imperial Crown in a painting by Anton von Werner

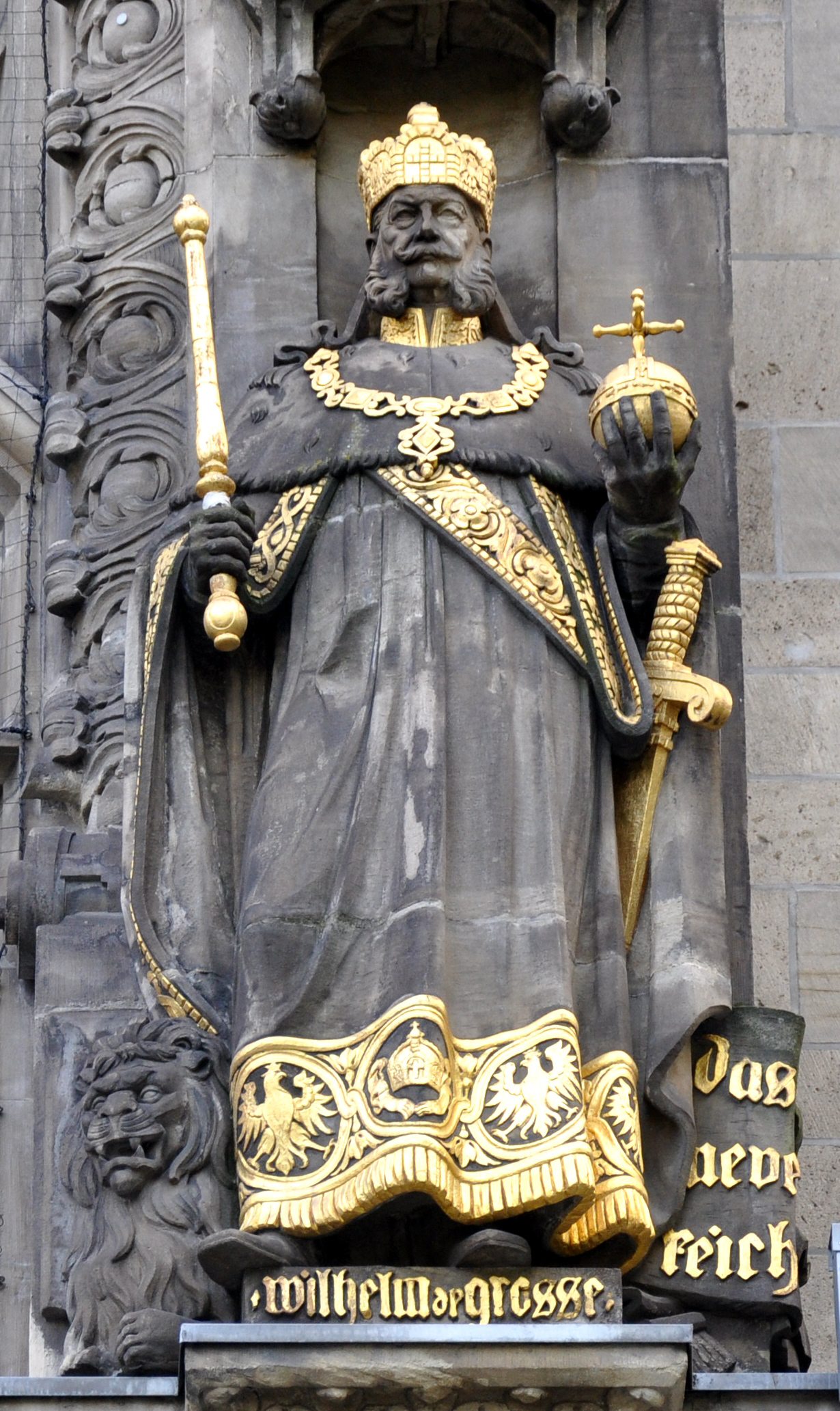
A statue of Kaiser Wilhelm I in Duisburg
