= Orders, decorations, and medals of the German Empire =

Orders, decorations, and medals of the German Empire lists many of the decorations awarded by the states which joined to form the German Empire under the leadership of Prussia in 1871. Also included are decorations of various German states which were no longer in existence in 1871, mainly because they had been annexed by Prussia before or during the wars of unification.

== German Empire ==
The German Empire consisted of 25 member states: four kingdoms, six grand duchies, five duchies, seven principalities and three Hanseatic cities. Each of these states awarded decorations for civil or military merit. In addition, the house order of the two former Hohenzollern principalities (Hohenzollern-Hechingen and Hohenzollern-Sigmaringen) continued to be awarded during the imperial era, although the states themselves had been annexed by Prussia.

Following the overthrow of the German monarchies during the German revolution of 1918–1919 after Germany's defeat in the First World War, the decorations ceased to be issued. However, as late as the Second World War (1939–1945), it was not uncommon for some recipients of imperial decorations earned in the earlier war to continue to wear them on Wehrmacht and Nazi Party uniforms, along with the more recent awards and decorations of Nazi Germany. The following is a list of the principal civil and military decorations issued by each imperial German state.

=== Kingdom of Prussia ===
Orders

- Order of the Black Eagle
- Order of Merit of the Prussian Crown
- Order of the Red Eagle
- Order of the Crown
- Royal House Order of Hohenzollern
- Pour le Mérite
- Order of Saint John (Bailiwick of Brandenburg)
- Order of Louise
- Wilhelm-Orden

Civil decorations

- General Honor Decoration
- Life Saving Medal
- Red Cross Medal
- Merit Cross in Gold or Silver
- Jerusalem Cross
- Cross of the Mount of Olives

Military and war decorations

- Military Merit Cross
- Iron Cross
- Military Honor Medal
- Merit Cross for War Aid
- Duppel Storm Cross
- Alsen Cross
- Warrior Merit Medal
- War Commemorative Medal for 1813/15
- War Commemorative Medal for 1864
- Commemorative Cross for 1866
- War Commemorative Medal of 1870/71
- Colonial Medal
- China Commemorative Medal
- South West Africa Commemorative Medal
- Centenary Medal

=== Kingdom of Bavaria ===
Orders

- Order of St. Hubertus
- Royal Order of Saint George for the Defense of the Immaculate Conception
- Military Order of Max Joseph
- Merit Order of the Bavarian Crown
- Merit Order of St. Michael
- Maximilian Order for Science and Art
- Military Merit Order
- Military Medical Order
- Ludwig Order
- Order of Saint Elizabeth (for women)
- Order of Theresa (for women)

Civil decorations

- Civil Merit Medal
- Ludwig Medal for Science and Art
- Ludwig Medal for Industry
- Prince Regent Luitpold Medal

Military and war decorations

- Golden and Silver Military Merit Medals
- Military Merit Cross
- Military Medical Decoration
- Merit Cross for Volunteer Nursing
- Jubilee Medal for the Bavarian Army
- King Ludwig Cross

=== Kingdom of Saxony ===
Orders

- Order of the Rue Crown
- Military Order of St. Henry
- Civil Order of Saxony (also called the Civil Merit Order)
- Albert Order
- Order of Sidonia (for women)
- Order of Maria-Anna (for women)

Civil decorations

- Honor Cross (formerly, General Honor Decoration)
- Lifesaving Medal
- Medal Virtuti et Ingenio
- Medal Bene Merentibus

Military and war decorations

- War Merit Cross
- Friedrich August Medal

=== Kingdom of Württemberg ===
Orders

- Order of the Württemberg Crown
- Military Merit Order
- Friedrich Order
- Order of Olga (for women)

Civil decorations

- Merit Medal
- Merit Cross
- Gold Medal for Art and Science
- Lifesaving Medal

Military and war decorations

- Military Merit Medal
- Merit Cross with Swords
- Wilhelm Cross
- Charlotte Cross

=== Grand Duchy of Baden ===
Orders

- House Order of Fidelity
- Military Karl-Friedrich Merit Order
- Order of Berthold the First
- Order of the Zähringer Lion

Civil decorations

- Medal of Merit
- 1902 Jubilee Medal
- Friedrich-Luisen Medal
- 1906 Commemorative Medal
- Lifesaving Medal
- Medals for Art and Science

Military and war decorations

- War Merit Cross
- Karl Friedrich Military Medal of Merit
- Commemorative Cross for the Campaign of 1870–71
- Cross for Volunteer War Aid
- Field Service Decoration

=== Grand Duchy of Hesse ===
Orders

- House Order of the Golden Lion
- Ludwig Order
- Order of Philip the Magnanimous
- Order of the Star of Brabant

Civil decorations

- General Honor Decoration
- Lifesaving Medal
- Merit Medals for Science, Art, Industry, and Agriculture

Military and war decorations

- General Honor Decoration for Bravery or for War Merit
- Military Merit Cross of 1870/71
- Warrior Honor Decoration in Iron
- Military Medical Cross, 1870/71 and 1914
- Honor Decoration for War Welfare Service
- War Honor Decoration

=== Grand Duchy of Mecklenburg-Schwerin ===
Orders

- House Order of the Wendish Crown
- Order of the Griffon

Civil decorations

- Merit Medal
- Medal For Arts and Sciences

Military and war decorations

- Military Merit Cross
- Friedrich Franz Cross
- Friedrich Franz Alexandra Cross

=== Grand Duchy of Mecklenburg-Strelitz ===
Orders

- House Order of the Wendish Crown
- Order of the Griffon

Civil decorations

- Merit Medal
- Order for Art and Science

Military and war decorations

- Cross for Distinction in War
- Adolf Friedrich Cross

=== Grand Duchy of Oldenburg ===
Orders

- House and Merit Order of Peter Frederick Louis

Civil decorations

- Civil Merit Medal
- Medal of Merit for Rescue from Danger
- Red Cross Medal
- Medal for Merit in the Arts

Military and war decorations

- Friedrich August Cross
- War Merit Medal

=== Grand Duchy of Saxe-Weimar-Eisenach ===
Orders

- House Order of Vigilance or the White Falcon

Civil decorations

- Merit Medal (to 1902)
- General Honor Decoration (from 1902)
- Lifesaving Medal

Military and war decorations

- Wilhelm Ernst War Cross
- General Honor Decoration with Swords
- Honor Cross for Homeland Merit

=== Duchy of Anhalt ===
Orders

- Order of Albert the Bear
- Order of Merit for Science and Art

Civil decorations

- Meritorious Honor Decoration for Rescue from Danger
- 1896 Jubilee Medal

Military and war decorations

- Friedrich Cross
- Marian Cross (for women and girls)

=== Duchy of Brunswick ===
Orders

- House Order of Henry the Lion

Civil decorations

- Lifesaving Medal

Military and war decorations

- War Merit Cross
- Waterloo Medal
- War Merit Cross for Women and Girls

=== Duchies of Saxe-Altenburg, Saxe-Coburg-Gotha and Saxe-Meiningen ===
Orders

- Saxe-Ernestine House Order (associated medals were different for each duchy)

Civil decorations

- Medal for Art and Science (each duchy had its own version)
- Lifesaving Medal (each duchy had its own version)
- Duke Carl Eduard Medal (Saxe-Coburg-Gotha)

Military and war decorations

- Duke Ernst Medal (Saxe-Altenburg)
- Oval Silver Duke Carl Eduard Medal with Crown (Saxe-Coburg-Gotha)
- Carl Eduard War Cross (Saxe-Coburg-Gotha)
- Cross for Merit in War (Saxe-Meiningen)
- Medal for Merit in War (Saxe-Meiningen)
- Cross for Merit for Women and Maidens in War Welfare Work (Saxe-Meiningen)

=== Principality of Lippe ===
Orders

- House Order of the Honour Cross
- Order of Leopold
- Bertha Order
- Lippe Rose Order for Art and Science

Civil decorations

- Merit Medal
- Lifesaving Medal

Military and war decorations

- War Honor Cross for Heroic Deeds
- War Merit Cross
- Military Merit Medal
- War Honor Medal

=== Principalities of Reuss Elder Line and Reuss Younger Line ===
Orders

- Princely Reuss Honour Cross

Civil decorations

- Merit Cross
- Merit Cross for Art and Science
- Merit Medal
- Merit Medal for Art and Science
- Lifesaving Medal

Military and war decorations

- War Merit Cross
- Medal for Self-Sacrificing Activity in Wartime

=== Principality of Schaumburg-Lippe ===
Orders

- House Order of the Honour Cross
- Order for Art and Science

Civil decorations

- Merit Medal
- Lifesaving Medal
- Prince Adolf Medal

Military and war decorations

- Military Merit Cross
- Military Merit Medal
- Cross for Loyal Service

=== Principalities of Schwarzburg-Rudolstadt and Schwarzburg-Sondershausen ===
Orders

- Princely Schwarzburg Honor Cross

Civil decorations

- Merit Medals for Art and Science, Trade and Industry, and Agriculture
- Medal for Rescue from Danger
- Honor Decoration for Servants and Workers

Military and war decorations

- Medal for Merit in War
- Honor Medal
- Merit Medal

=== Principality of Waldeck and Pyrmont ===
Orders

- Order of Merit

Civil decorations

- Honor Cross
- Merit Medal
- Medal for Art and Science

Military and war decorations

- Honor Cross with Swords
- Merit Medal with Swords
- Friedrich-Bathildis Medal

=== Free and Hanseatic Cities of Bremen, Hamburg and Lübeck ===
Civil decorations

- Lifesaving Medal (Lübeck)

Military and war decorations

- Joint War Commemorative Medal for the Hanseatic Legion
- Hanseatic Cross (each city-state had its own version)

=== Imperial German badges ===
In addition to decorations and honors for valor or other military or civilian merit, imperial Germany issued several badges during the First World War recognizing soldiers, sailors and airmen for being members of specialized combat components, such as submarine or aircraft crews, or for having been wounded in the conflict.

- Aerial Observer Badge
- Commemorative Badge for Airship Crews
- Naval Seaplane Pilot Badge
- Prussian Military Pilot Badge
- U-Boat War Badge
- Wound Badge (1918)

== Former German states ==
Prussia annexed two small Hohenzollern principalities in 1850. After Prussia's victory in the Austro-Prussian War in 1866, it annexed several German states that had been allied with Austria-Hungary. These included the Kingdom of Hanover, the Duchy of Nassau, the Electorate of Hesse and the Free City of Frankfurt, in addition to Hesse-Homburg, a former Landgraviate ceded by the Grand Duchy of Hesse. The following is a list of the principal civil and military decorations of these states.

=== Kingdom of Hanover ===
Orders

- Order of St. George
- Royal Guelphic Order
- Order of Ernst August

Civil decorations

- Merit Medal
- General Honor Decoration for Civil Merit
- Golden Honor Medal for Art and Science
- Merit Medal for Rescue from Danger

Military and war decorations

- General Honor Decoration for Military Merit
- Waterloo Medal
- Langensalza Medal

=== Electorate of Hesse ===
Orders

- House Order of the Golden Lion
- Wilhelm Order
- Pour la Vertu Militaire
- Order of the Iron Helmet

Civil decorations

- Civil Merit Medal and Civil Merit Cross

Military and war decorations

- Military Merit Medal and Military Merit Cross

=== Duchy of Nassau ===
Orders

- Order of the Gold Lion of the House of Nassau
- Civil and Military Order of Adolph of Nassau

Civil decorations

- Civil Merit Medal
- Lifesaving Medal
- Medal for Art and Science

Military and war decorations

- Medal of Valor
- Waterloo Medal
- Medal for the Campaign of 1866

=== Landgraviate of Hesse-Homburg ===
Military and war decorations

- Cross with Swords 1814–1815
- Field Service Decoration for the 1849 Campaign

=== Principalities of Hohenzollern-Hechingen and Hohenzollern-Sigmaringen ===
Orders

- Princely House Order of Hohenzollern

=== Free City of Frankfurt ===
Military and war decorations

- War Commemorative Medal for 1813/1814
- War Commemorative Medal for 1814
- War Commemorative Medal for 1815
- War Commemorative Medal 1848–1849

== Sources ==
- Hessenthal, Waldemar von; Schreiber, Georg (2001). Honours and Awards of the German States. Naval & Military Press. ISBN 978-1-843-42144-3.
- Neville, Donald G. (1974): Medals, Ribbons & Orders of Imperial Germany & Austria. Balfour Publications. ISBN 978-0-859-44009-7
