= Waterloo Medal (disambiguation) =

The Waterloo Medal was a medal given to British Army members who served on the Battle of Waterloo.

The Waterloo Medal may also refer to:

- Waterloo Medal (Brunswick), given by the Duchy of Brunswick
- Waterloo Medal (Nassau), given by the Duchy of Nassau
- Waterloo Medal (Pistrucci), designed by Benedetto Pistrucci
