= Wilhelm von Dörnberg =

German general (1768–1850)

Wilhelm Caspar Ferdinand von Dörnberg KCB GCH HEGL HEIH KSA KSG KW POM RANO
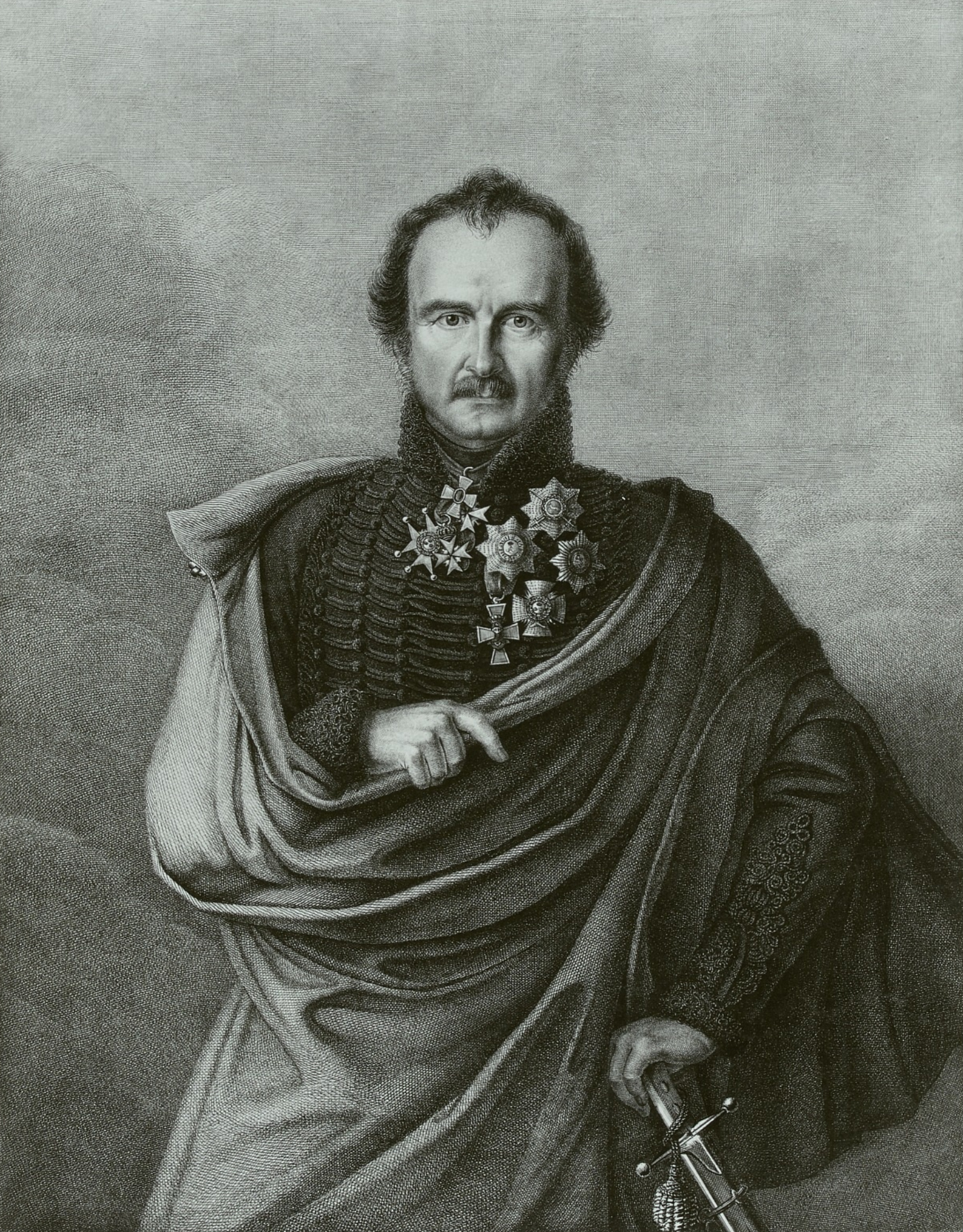
- Wilhelm von Dörnberg by Ludwig Emil Grimm
- Born: 14 April 1768; Schloss Hausen, Hesse-Kassel
- Died: 19 March 1850 (aged 81); Münster, Prussia
- Other name: Sir William de Dornberg
- Spouse: Julie von Münster-Meinhövel
- Children: 8
- Relatives: Johann Friedrich von und zu Mansbach (uncle)
- Military career
- Allegiance: Hesse-Kassel; Prussia; Westphalia; Brunswick; United Kingdom; Hanover
- Branch: Various armies
- Service years: 1783–1796 (Hesse-Kassel); 1796–1807 (Prussia); 1809 (Westphalia); 1809 (Brunswick); 1809–1816 (United Kingdom); 1816–1831 (Hanover)
- Rank: Captain (Hessel-Kassel/Prussia); Colonel (Westphalia); Major-General (United Kingdom); Lieutenant-General (Hanover)
- Commands: Westphalian Guard Jaeger Battalion; Black Legion cavalry Brunswick Oels Hussars; Russian–German Legion; 1st Cavalry Brigade (KGL); 3rd Cavalry Brigade; 1st Hanoverian Cavalry Brigade
- Conflicts: French Revolutionary Wars; Flanders campaign; Napoleonic Wars; Battle of Lübeck; Siege of Hamburg; Battle of the Göhrde; Battle of Quatre Bras; Battle of Waterloo (WIA)
- Awards: Waterloo Medal; Hanseatic Medal for the Campaign of 1813–1814; Medal "For the Capture of Paris"

Wilhelm Caspar Ferdinand Freiherr von Dörnberg KCB KCH (14 April 1768 – 19 March 1850) was a German army officer who served in the French Revolutionary and Napoleonic Wars.

== Life ==
=== Family ===
The family of Freiherrs of Dörnberg derived from the Protestant Hessian nobility and was a member of the Old-Hessian 'Ritterschaft'. Since 1732, it had held the office of Erbküchenmeister (Erbhofmeister) of Hesse-Kassel.

=== Early career ===
Dörnberg joined the First Guard Battalion of Hesse-Kassel in January 1783 and was appointed First Lieutenant on 22 January 1785. His first war experience was gained in the 1792 in campaign against France in the Champagne Region. On 6 December 1792, he received his patent as a Staff Captain.

=== Dörnberg's Uprising (22–24 April 1809) ===
Dörnberg was involved with various anti-French plotters and agitators both locally in Westphalia and likely within Berlin. He accepted a commission in the Westphalian Guards in December 1807 and rose quickly in rank, apparently gaining King Jérôme's trust.

He was promoted to Royal Adjutant and Commander of the Garde-Jäger of Marburg in late February 1809. The uprising itself was preceded by many secret meetings, centered at Wallenstein Abbey and the "Dörnberg Temple" in Homberg. Abbess Marianne von und zum Stein, Canoness Karoline von Baumbach and Dörnberg met there. The plan was to incite the military against their monarch. Armed men were to gather in Homberg, Wolfhagen, Münden, Gudensberg, and Hofgeismar, and capture the King with the soldiers in Kassel.

With an imminent war between France and Austria in the spring of 1809, it must have seemed to the plotters that the time was right. A separate early April insurrection by former Lieutenant Katte was apparently planned to seize the important fortress of Magdeburg. Despite Katte's rebellion quick collapse by the 5th of April, Dörnberg and his followers continued with their own plans around the capital of Westphalia, Kassel.

By the morning of 22 April 1809, several different groups began moves originally designed to seize King Jérôme and secure the capital. But coordination was difficult and the lack of discipline was fatal to the cause. By the morning of April 23, a small yet organized French and Westphalian force (most of the 1st Cuirassiers under Oberst Marschall) led by GD Jean-Jacques Reubell opposed the southern mob of rebels that eventually gathered at the tiny hamlet of Knallhütte (now Kirchbauna) 10 kilometers south of Kassel and quickly dispersed them.

Colonel Dörnberg, then staying in Kassel, was accused by Jérôme of instigating a rebellion, and hurried to Homberg to lead armed peasants toward Kassel, where royal troops were already waiting for them. With this action, he lost control of trained soldiers and the chance to quickly capture the King. In the aftermath, Dörnberg fled south in civilian disguise and eventually made it to Bohemia, and then to England, where he re-entered military service.

Another force of about 1,200 rebels and rebels of the 1st Cuirassier heavy cavalrymen to the west met a similar fate at Wolfhagen where they were opposed by GB Philippe de Rivet Comte d'Albignac and the 1st Squadron of Garde Chevauxlegers largely of Polish soldiers. In the aftermath, the leader of the rebel Cuirassiers claimed to have only been pretending to join the rebels to avoid being captured by them. He also later fled.

A final group of about 4,000 was approaching the capital from the northwest and halted about 8 kilometers outside the city. When news of Dörnberg's defeat and disappearance reached them, this mob also began to disperse. Despite some of the leaders heading east and trying again, these few were seized by the local authorities and sent to the capital as prisoners. As evening closed on the 23rd of April, the uprising had collapsed and its leadership had either fled or been captured. For his part, Dörnberg was sentenced to death in absentia in Kassel for high treason.

=== Later career ===
He entered Russian service in 1812 and Hanoverian service in 1815, where he was promoted to Lieutenant General. Prior to the Battle of Waterloo, Dörnberg detained a British scout who was bringing news of Napoleon’s troop movements to Wellington. As a result of the delay of this intelligence, Wellington was unable to concentrate his forces in time to support Blucher at the Battle of Ligny. British Senior Intelligence Officer Colquhoun Grant attributed the subsequent loss at Ligny to the “stupidity of a Hanoverian cavalry brigadier”. Wilhelm von Dörnberg was stationed as the Hannoverian envoy at the court of the Tsar in St. Petersburg from 1825 to 1830.
