= Military Merit Medal =

Military Merit Medal or Medal of Military Merit may refer to:

- Argentine Army Military Merit Medal
- Military Merit Medal (Austria–Hungary)
- Military Merit Medal (Bavaria), see Orders, decorations, and medals of the German Empire
- Medal of Military Merit (Greece)
- Military Merit Medal (Lippe)
- Military Merit Medal (Philippines)
- Medal for Military Merit (Republika Srpska)
- Military Merit Medal (South Africa)
- Medal of Military Merit (Uruguay)
- Military Merit Medal (Vietnam)

== See also ==
- Military Merit Cross (disambiguation)
- Military Merit Order (disambiguation)
- Order of Military Merit (disambiguation)
