= Military Merit Cross =

Military Merit Cross is the name for a military decoration in various states, including:

- Military Merit Cross (Austria–Hungary) (Militärverdienstkreuz) (in three classes)
- Several orders, decorations, and medals of the German Empire, including the German States of Hesse and Waldeck
  - Military Merit Cross (Prussia) (Militär-Verdienstkreuz), also called the Golden Military Merit Cross (Goldenes Militär-Verdienstkreuz)
  - Military Merit Cross (Bavaria) (Militär-Verdienstkreuz) (in three classes)
  - Military Merit Cross (Mecklenburg-Schwerin) (Militärverdienstkreuz) (in two classes)

== See also ==
- Military Merit Medal (disambiguation)
- Military Merit Order (disambiguation)
- Order of Military Merit (disambiguation)
- Military Cross of Merit (Poland)
- Cross of Military Merit (Spain)

Orders, decorations, and medals of the German Empire
