= General Honor Decoration =

General Honor Decoration may refer to:

- General Honor Decoration (Hesse)
- General Honor Decoration (Prussia)
