= Oberaula =

- Municipality
- Coat of arms

- Location of Oberaula within Schwalm-Eder-Kreis district
- Interactive map of Oberaula
- Location within Germany Location within Hesse
- Coordinates: 50°51′N 09°28′E
- Country: Germany
- State: Hesse
- Admin. region: Kassel
- District: Schwalm-Eder-Kreis
- Subdivisions: 6 Ortsteile

Government
  - Mayor (2021–27): Klaus Wagner (CDU)

Area
  - Total: 43.95 km^{2} (16.97 sq mi)
- Elevation: 280–590 m (920–1,940 ft)

Population (2025-12-31)
  - Total: 3,235
  - Density: 73.61/km^{2} (190.6/sq mi)
- Time zone: UTC+01:00 (CET)
  - Summer (DST): UTC+02:00 (CEST)
- Postal codes: 36280
- Dialling codes: 06628
- Vehicle registration: HR
- Website: www.oberaula.de

Oberaula is a municipality in the Schwalm-Eder district in Hesse, Germany.

== Geography ==
=== Location ===
Oberaula lies in the Knüllgebirge, a low mountain range, in the Aula river valley and its neighbouring valleys.

The nearest towns are Bad Hersfeld (about 20 km to the east), Schwalmstadt (about 25 km to the west), and Homberg (about 27 km to the north).

=== Constituent communities ===
The community consists of the six centres of Hausen, Friedigerode, Ibra, Oberaula (administrative seat), Olberode and Wahlshausen.

== History ==
Oberaula was first mentioned in 856 as Ovilaha (roughly "the place in a moist river floodplain" or "the place at the owl water") and the constituent community of Hausen was first mentioned in 1160. Quite early on, the Fulda Abbey had a castle with a moat in Hausen, upon whose remains the Barons of Dörnberg built their Renaissance stately home in 1674.

=== Amalgamations ===
As part of municipal reforms, the two communities of Oberaula and Hausen merged on 1 April 1972. On 1 January 1974 came the formation of the Greater Community of Oberaula with the amalgamation of the other above-named communities with Oberaula.

== Politics ==
=== Municipal council ===
The council is made up of 23 members. As of the last municipal elections held on 26 March 2006, the seats are apportioned thus:

SPD	: 11 seats
CDU	: 12 seats

The community executive consists of 7 members. Four of these seats are held by the CDU and three by the SPD.

The mayor Klaus Wagner (CDU) was elected in 2009, and re-elected in 2016.

=== Coat of arms ===
Oberaula's civic coat of arms might heraldically be described thus: Azure an owl argent armed gules flanked by six mullets of six of the second and standing on a mount of three Or surmounted by a three-leafed oak sprig vert.

The blue background has its roots in a traditional story that mentions a blue flag. The owl stands for Oberaula and the six stars for the six constituent communities. The stars were chosen as the Counts of Ziegenhain, who held sway in the area for centuries, bore the star in their arms. The three-knolled hill – called a Dreiberg in German heraldry – stands for the Knüllgebirge in which the community lies, and the oak sprig refers to the community's membership in the former Kurhessen-Waldeck Tourist Association.

=== Municipal partnerships ===
- Marsanne, France since 1996.

== Culture and sightseeing ==
=== Buildings ===
- Schloss Hausen (stately home), from 1674
- Steinmühle ("Stone Mill", a still-working old watermill)

== Economy and infrastructure ==
=== Transport ===
Oberaula lies on Federal Highway (Bundesstraße) B 454 (Kirchhain – Niederaula).

The community belongs to the North Hesse Transport Network.

Through the railway stations at Bad Hersfeld and Treysa, the community is connected to the railway network. The former Knüllwaldbahn railway between Bad Hersfeld and Treysa is out of service.

== Personalities ==
=== Sons and daughters of the community ===
- Wilhelm Caspar Ferdinand Freiherr von Dörnberg (born 14 April 1768 in Schloss Hausen, died 19 March 1850 in Münster) was a German general and freedom fighter.

== Sundry ==
Oberaula shares its name with nearby Niederaula (Ober = "upper"; Nieder = "lower") in the neighbouring Hersfeld-Rotenburg district.
