= Wolfgang Muff =

German general (1880–1947)

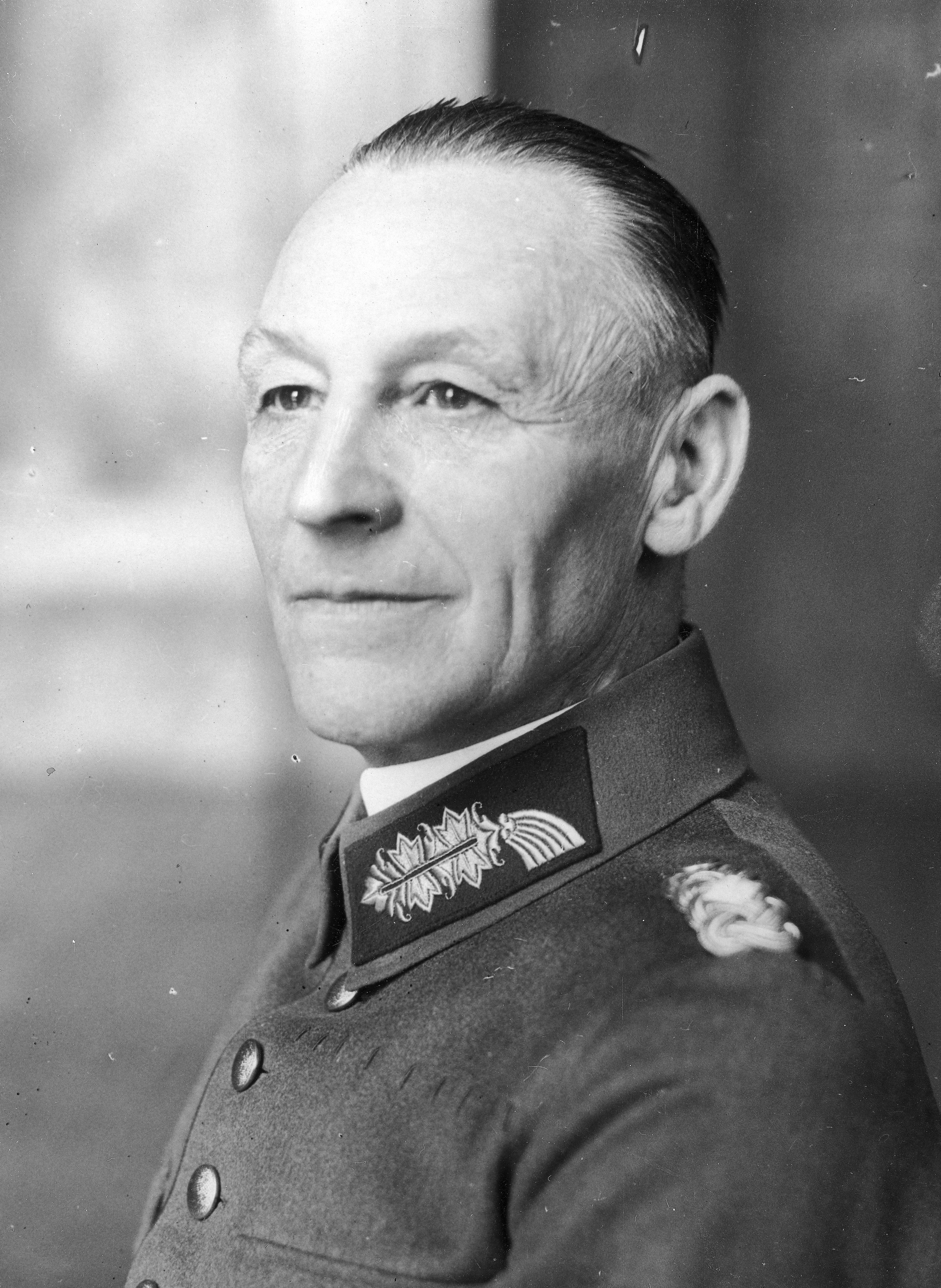
- Muff in 1933
- Born: 15 March 1880; Ulm, Kingdom of Württemberg, German Empire
- Died: 17 May 1947 (aged 67); Hämelschenburg, Lower Saxony, Germany
- Military career
- Allegiance: German Empire (to 1918); Weimar Republic (to 1933); Nazi Germany
- Branch: Imperial German Army; Reichswehr; Army (Wehrmacht)
- Service years: 1899–1943
- Rank: General of the Infantry
- Commands: 13th Infantry Regiment; Wehrkreis XI
- Conflicts: World War I World War II
- Awards: German Cross, in silver War Merit Cross, 1st and 2nd class

Wolfgang Muff (15 March 1880 – 17 May 1947) was a German career military officer who fought in both world wars. Beginning in 1899, he served successively in the Imperial German Army, the Reichswehr and the Wehrmacht, attaining the rank of General of the Infantry during World War II and retiring in 1943.

== Service in the German Empire and the Weimar Republic ==
Born in 1880 at Ulm to Generalleutnant Karl von Muff, Wolfgang Muff attended the Karlsgymnasium in Stuttgart and joined the Army of Württemberg, a component of the Imperial German Army, as an officer cadet in 1899. Assigned to the 126th (8th Württemberg) Infantry Regiment in Strasbourg, he was commissioned as a Leutnant in 1900. He served as a battalion adjutant and was seconded to the Prussian Staff College in Berlin in 1908. Rising through the ranks, he fought in World War I and served in several staff positions, including that of the Chief of Field Railways, and he also was attached for a time to the Great General Staff. He participated in the 2nd Army's 1918 spring offensive in France as a battalion commander with the 120th (2nd Württemberg) Infantry Regiment, and was severely wounded. Muff was heavily decorated, including earning both classes of the Iron Cross. At the end of the war, he was a Major on the staff of Army Group Gallwitz.

Muff remained in the post-war Reichswehr during the Weimar Republic and was assigned to Wehrkreis (military district) V in Stuttgart. From April 1924, he commanded the 2nd Battalion of the 14th Infantry Regiment in Tübingen and was promoted to Oberstleutnant in 1925. Starting in December 1926, he served in the League of Nations Department of the Ministry of the Reichswehr, attaining the rank of Oberst in 1928. Muff commanded the 13th Infantry Regiment stationed at Ludwigsburg from 1 March 1930 until 20 September 1931. He was promoted to Generalmajor on 1 October 1931 and became the infantry commander in Wehrkreis V. The following year, he was named commander of all army units in Württemberg. In September 1932, Muff left the Reichswehr and took up teaching posts in military science at the University of Tübingen and the Technische Hochschule Stuttgart.

== Military attaché and involvement in the Anschluss ==
On 1 April 1933, Muff returned to active duty as the military attaché in Vienna to Franz von Papen, the German ambassador to Austria. He held this post from 1934 to 1938, and was promoted to Generalleutnant on 1 August 1936. According to Papen, documents approved by Rudolf Hess indicate that Adolf Hitler considered having Papen or Muff murdered in early 1938; Hitler would then blame the deaths on Austrians to provide an excuse for Germany to intervene in Austrian affairs. On 11 March 1938, Muff delivered the German ultimatum threatening an invasion to Wilhelm Miklas, but the Austrian president refused to yield. Arthur Seyss-Inquart, however, forged a telegram requesting German intervention in Austria which led to the Anschluss of Austria into Nazi Germany the following day. Muff then headed the so-called "Muff Commission", which determined which Austrian military officers would be allowed to transfer from the Bundesheer into the Wehrmacht.

== World War II ==
Muff was promoted to General of the Infantry on 1 December 1940 while he was serving as the deputy commander of XI Army Corps in Wehrkreis XI, headquartered in Hanover. From the mobilization on 1 September 1939 until 28 February 1943, he was also the military commander in the Wehrkreis. Upon his retirement from the army on 30 April 1943, he was awarded the German Cross in silver. Muff died on 17 May 1947 in Hämelschenburg in Lower Saxony.

== Awards and decorations ==
- Order of the Crown 4th Class
- Knight's Cross of the House Order of Hohenzollern
- Iron Cross (1914) 2nd and 1st class
- Wound Badge in black
- Order of Military Merit of Bavaria 4th class with swords
- War Merit Cross of Saxony
- Knight's Cross of the Military Merit Order of Württemberg
- Knight's Cross 1st class of the Friedrich Order with swords
- Knight's Cross 1st class of the Order of the Zähringen Lion
- Hanseatic Cross (Hamburg)
- Military Merit Cross of Mecklenburg-Schwerin 1st class
- Order of the Iron Crown 3rd class
- Military Merit Cross, 3rd class with war decoration
- Gallipoli Star
- Honour Cross of the World War 1914/1918
- German Cross in silver (30 April 1943)
- War Merit Cross 1st and 2nd class with swords

== Sources ==
- Hammerich, Helmut R.: Muff, Wolfgang in the Deutsche Biographie (in German)
- Infanterie-Regiment 13 in Lexikon der Wehrmacht. (in German)
- Muff, Wolfgang in Lexikon der Wehrmacht. (in German)
- Shirer, William L. (1960). The Rise and Fall of the Third Reich. New York: Simon & Schuster. LCCN 60-6729.
- Webb, James Jack (2024). Generals and Admirals of the Third Reich: For Country or Fuehrer. Vol. 2: H–O. Havertown, PA: Casemate Publishers. ISBN 978-1-952-71517-4.
