= James Frederick Lyon =

British army officer and colonial administrator

Lieutenant-General Sir James Frederick Lyon GCH KCB

Governor of Barbados
- In office 1829–1833
- Monarchs: George IV; William IV
- Preceded by: Sir Henry Warde
- Succeeded by: Sir Lionel Smith, 1st Baronet

Personal details
- Born: 1775 Atlantic Ocean
- Died: 16 October 1842 (aged 66–67) Brighton, Sussex
- Awards: Army Gold Medal; Order of the Sword (Sweden); Military Order of Max Joseph (Bavaria)

Military service
- Allegiance: United Kingdom
- Branch/service: British Army
- Years of service: 1791–1844
- Rank: Lieutenant-General
- Battles/wars: French Revolutionary Wars; Glorious First of June; West Indies campaign; Fédon's rebellion; Egypt campaign; Battle of Alexandria; Napoleonic Wars; Peninsular War; Battle of Vimeiro; Battle of Talavera; Battle of Bussaco; Siege of Badajoz; German campaign; Battle of the Göhrde; Hundred Days

Lieutenant-General Sir James Frederick Lyon GCH KCB (1775 – 16 October 1842) was a British army officer and colonial administrator who served as the governor of Barbados from 1829 to 1833.

== Biography ==
James Frederick Lyon was a descendant of the Lyons family, from whom the Lords Glamis were also descended. James Frederick was son of Captain James Lyon, of the 35th Regiment of Foot, and his wife, who was the daughter of James Hamilton.

James Frederick was born in 1775, on board a transport-ship that was homeward bound from America, subsequent to the Battle of Bunker's Hill, at which his father was killed.

On 4 August 1791, James Frederick was appointed an ensign to the 25th Regiment of Foot. He was promoted to lieutenant on 26 April 1793; to captain on 5 April 1795; to major on 21 February 1799; to lieutenant-colonel on 13 May 1802; to brevet-colonel in 1811; to major-general in 1814; and to lieutenant-general in 1830.

Lyon served with detachments of his regiment, which embarked as marines on board HMS Gibraltar, 80 guns, Captain Mackenzie, and HMS Marlborough, 74 guns, Captain Hon. George Berkeley, in the Channel fleet under Lord Howe. He was thus present in the actions of 27 and 29 May, and the victory on the Glorious First of June 1794 Lyon next served with his regiment in the island of Grenada during the reign of terror there, when Governor Home and all the principal white inhabitants were massacred by Fédon's rebellion.

Lyon was on Lord George Lennox's staff at Plymouth in 1797–1798, and subsequently aide-de-camp to Sir Charles Stuart at Minorca. In 1799 he was appointed to a foreign corps, originally known as "Stuart's", or the Minorca Regiment, raised in that island by Sir John Stuart afterwards Count of Maida, with Lyon and Nicholas Trant as majors. The corps was successively known as the queen's German regiment and the 97th (queen's), and was disbanded as the 96th (queen's) in 1818. Lyon was with it in 1801 in Egypt, where it was engaged with Bonaparte's "invincibles" at the Battle of Alexandria on 21 March 1801, and was highly distinguished.

Lyon subsequently commanded the regiment in the Peninsula from 1808 to 1811 at the battles of Vimeiro, Talavera, Busaco, and the first siege of Badajoz. In June 1813 he was sent to Germany to assist in organising the new Hanoverian levies (distinct from the King's German Legion), and was present at the operations in the north of Germany in 1813–14, under the prince royal of Sweden. He commanded a division of Hanoverians at the battle of Göhrde in Hanover, 13 September 1813, and afterwards commanded a mixed force of Russians, Hanoverians, and Hanseatics, under Count von Benningsen, which blockaded Hamburg. Lyon commanded the 6th Hanoverian brigade during the Waterloo Campaign and the advance to Paris. The brigade was with the reserve near Hal on 18 June, and did not engage in the battle.

Lyon commanded the inland district in 1817, became Lieutenant-Governor of Portsmouth and General Officer Commanding South-West District in 1821 and was given command of the troops in the Windward and Leeward islands, with headquarters at Barbados, in 1828. He was promised the government of Gibraltar, but was disappointed. Lyon was a Knight Grand Cross of the Order of the Bath (20 January 1815), a Knight Grand Cross of the Royal Guelphic Order, and had the decorations of the Order of the Sword in Sweden and the Order of Max Joseph of Bavaria, with gold medals for Egypt, Vimeiro and Talavera, and the Hanoverian and Waterloo medals. In 1829 he was made colonel of the 24th (2nd Warwickshire) Regiment of Foot and equerry to Prince Adolphus, Duke of Cambridge.

He died at Brighton on 16 October 1842.

== Family ==
In 1820 Lyon married Anna, the 21-year-old daughter of Edward Coxe, brother of Archdeacon William Coxe the historian.

== See also ==
- Lyons family

Military offices
Preceded by Sir George Cooke	GOC South-West District; 1821–1828	Succeeded by Sir Colin Campbell
Preceded by Sir David Baird	Colonel of the 24th (The 2nd Warwickshire) Regiment of Foot; 1829–1842	Succeeded by Robert Ellice
Preceded by New regiment	Colonel of the 97th (The Earl of Ulster's) Regiment of Foot; 1824–1829	Succeeded by Sir Robert William O'Callaghan
Government offices
Preceded by Sir Henry Warde, 1821–29	Governor of Barbados; 1829–1833	Succeeded by Sir Lionel Smith (& Windward Isles)
