= Order of Military Merit =

Order of Military Merit may refer to:

- Order of Military Merit (Brazil) Ordem do Mérito Militar
- Order of Military Merit (Bulgaria), National Order "For Military Merit"
- Order of Military Merit (Canada)
- Order of Military Merit (Cuba)
- Order of Military Merit (Dominican Republic)
- Order of Military Merit (France)
- Ordre du Mérite militaire (France)
- German States:
  - Military Merit Order (Bavaria)
  - Military Merit Order (Württemberg)
  - Karl-Friedrich Order of Military Merit (Baden)
- Military Order of Merit (Iran)
- Order of Military Merit (Jordan)
- Order of Military Merit (South Korea)
- Order of Military Merit (Mexico)
- Order of Military Merit (Morocco)
- Order of Military Merit (Paraguay)
- Order of Military Merit (Romania)
- Order of Military Merit (Spain) (Orden del Mérito Militar)
- Order of Military Merit (Russia)
- Order of Military Merit (Yugoslavia)
- Order of Military Merit (Bangladesh)

== See also ==
- Military Merit Cross (disambiguation)
- Military Merit Medal (disambiguation)
- Military Merit Order (disambiguation)
- Order of merit
