= Thomas James (soldier) =

British soldier (1789–1827)

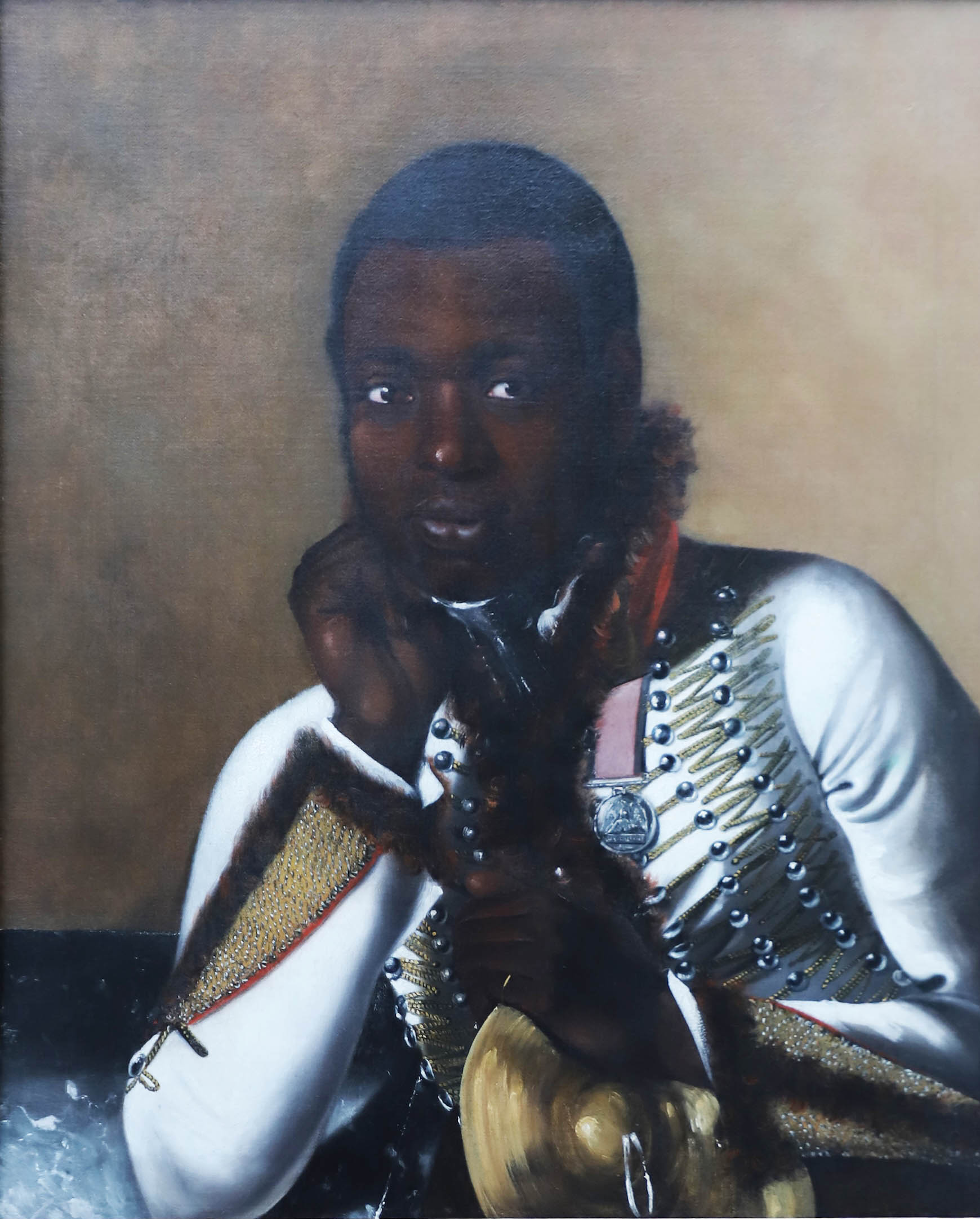
- Possible portrait attributed to Thomas Phillips, 1821
- Born: c. 1789; Montserrat, British West Indies
- Died: c. 1827 (aged 37–38)
- Military career
- Allegiance: United Kingdom
- Branch: British Army
- Service years: 1809–1821
- Rank: Private
- Units: 18th Hussars; 3rd Regiment of Foot Guards
- Conflicts: Napoleonic Wars; Peninsular War; War of the Seventh Coalition; Waterloo campaign

Private Thomas James (c. 1789–1827) was a British soldier who served in the Napoleonic Wars. Born in Montserrat, James eventually made his way to England and began working as a domestic servant in Surrey. In 1809, he enlisted in the British Army's 18th Hussars as a bandsman and served in the Peninsular War. James subsequently served in the 1815 Waterloo campaign, and though missing the Battle of Waterloo he was injured defending the baggage of his regiment's officers from Hanoverian Army deserters.

In 1816, James was awarded the Waterloo Medal, one of only nine Black soldiers known to have received it. He left the British army at some point, but re-enlisted in the 18th Hussars in 1819. The regiment was disbanded in 1821 while James was in Ireland, and he went to London and enlisted in the 3rd Regiment of Foot Guards as a bandsman, but was discharged in the same year. His further fate is unknown, but he possibly died in 1827. In 2025, the National Army Museum identified James as a likely sitter in a newly-acquired portrait attributed to Thomas Phillips; publicity around the painting raised awareness about the presence of Black soldiers in the Georgian British Army.

== Early life ==
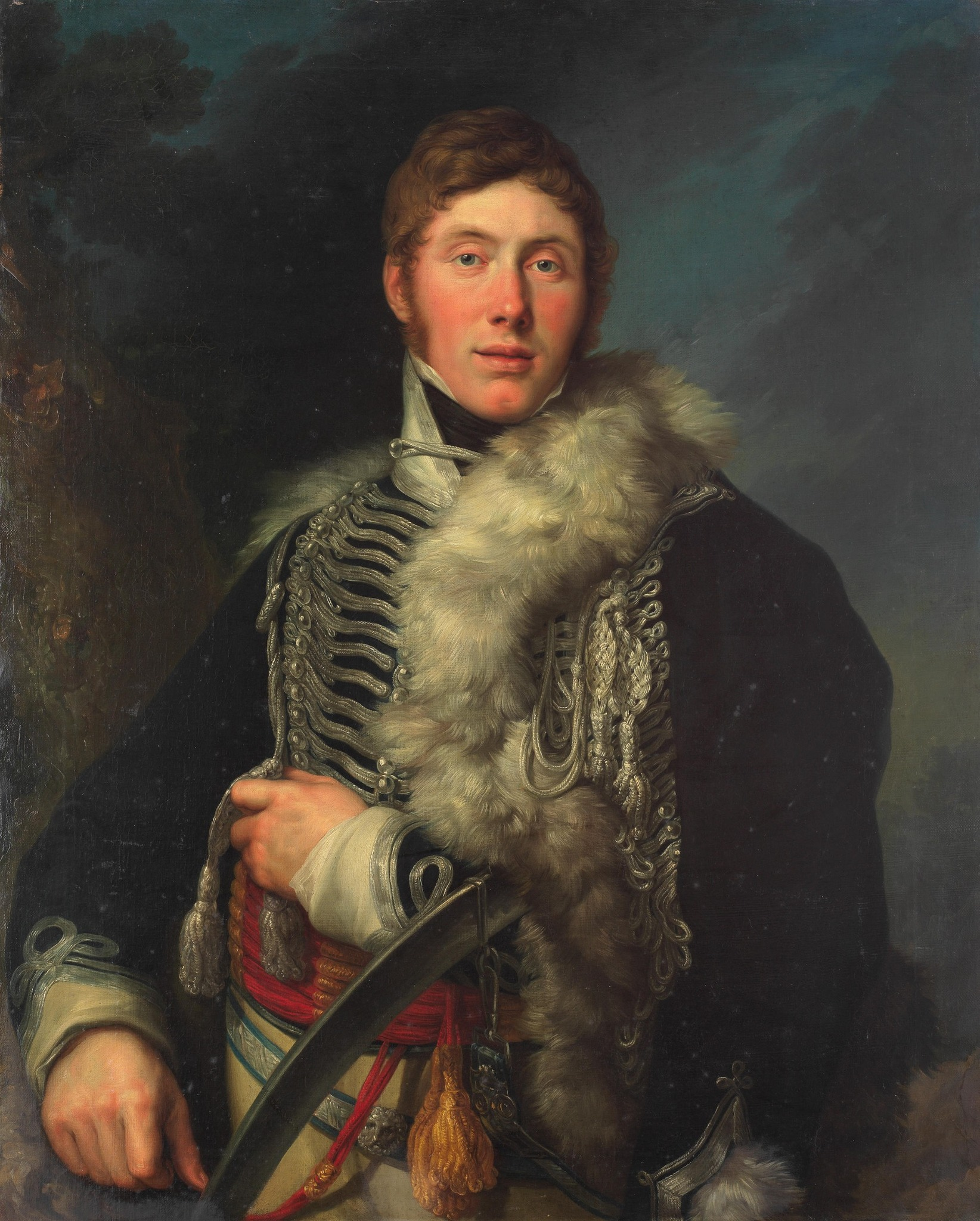
An officer of the 18th Hussars. James served in the regiment for most of his military career

Details of Thomas James' early life are not certain, but army records note that he was born in c. 1789 in Montserrat, possibly into slavery. By 1809, James had made his way to England and had effectively become a free man, working in Sussex as a domestic servant. In June 1809, he enlisted in the British Army's 18th Hussars at Arundel for "unlimited service" at the rank of private. His enlistment records describe James as being 5 foot 7 tall.

At the time of James' enlistment, career options for Black men in Britain were limited, and those who did not wish to work as domestic servants often enlisted in the British army as musicians. As historians including John Ellis and Peter Fryer have documented, service in the army was attractive for potential black recruits due to its racial equality, including equal wages, pensions and treatment with white soldiers. James served as a bandsman in the 18th's regimental band, and was sent to Spain as part of the Peninsular War.

== Waterloo campaign ==
In 1815, James served in the Waterloo campaign of the War of the Seventh Coalition. The 18th Hussars left Britain and landed at Ostend in April 1815. Though he was not present at the Battle of Waterloo, on 18 June, the day the battle was fought, James was badly injured while brawling with soldiers of the Hanoverian Army's Duke of Cumberland’s Hussars (Brunswickers) who had deserted and were attempting to loot the baggage of the 18th Hussar's officers. Though there were 20 British soldiers protecting the baggage, he was the only one who was severely wounded in the brawl.

In 1816, James was awarded the Waterloo Medal along with the rest of his regiment that had served in the Waterloo campaign. The medal was the first British medal to be awarded to army personnel regardless of rank. Approximately 38,500 Waterloo Medals were issued in total, and James was one of only nine Black soldiers known to have been awarded it.

== Later life and death ==
James left the British army at some point, though he re-enlisted in the 18th Hussars in Newcastle in March 1819. As Black bandsmen were sought out by British regimental bands, they formed a small community and almost always re-enlisted after their regiments were disbanded. In 1821, James may have been the subject of a portrait attributed to Thomas Phillips which was possibly commissioned by officers of the 18th Hussars to commemorate James' courage during the brawl. Given the high cost of portraits, James could not have afforded to commission it himself on a private's salary.

In the same year the portrait was painted, the 18th was disbanded in Ireland. James proceeded to travel from Dublin to London where he was discharged with a daily pension of 5d on September 1821; his conduct was noted in records as being "very good". He re-enlisted in the 3rd Regiment of Foot Guards as a bandsman in the same month, with his enlistment records noting that James was single. However, he was discharged on 24 December 1821 when the regimental band was reduced in size. As James marked rather than signed his records, he was possibly illiterate. His final fate remains unknown, although annotations in his records suggest that he may have died in 1827.

== Legacy ==
In 2025, the National Army Museum (NAM) in Chelsea, London announced that it had identified James as the "likely" subject of a Georgian portrait attributed to Thomas Phillips. James may have been commemorated for his role in defending officers' luggage from Hanoverian deserters. The NAM purchased the portrait for £30,000 in 2024 and analysed and restored it with the assistance of experts from the University of Lincoln. On 21 October, the portrait was unveiled to the public at the museum's "Army at Home" gallery. Anna Lavelle, the NAM's art curator, noted the existence of the misconception that no Black soldiers fought at Waterloo and argued his life should be better known. The museum's director Justin Maciejewski argued the "remarkable" portrait served as a reminder of the British army's reliance on "personnel from many different backgrounds coming together for a 'common cause'".

Artnet News noted that the NAM's announcement formed part of a broader trend of Black people in British and American portraiture being identified due to new research. The historian Michael Rowe situated James' enlistment in the 18th Hussars in a broader context of previously marginalised groups using the Napoleonic Wars as an opportunity to improve their status. Rowe pointed out that Black enlistment in the British army mirrored Jews enlisting in the Prussian and Austrian armies, with veterans using their newfound status to demand greater political rights, describing James' experience as "therefore far from unusual." However, Rowe also noted that "while Napoleonic-era armies provided unusual, if not unique, opportunities for those otherwise on the margins, they also reinforced notions of difference that were fairly common at the time."
