= Max Ludwig (general) =

German general (1871–1961)

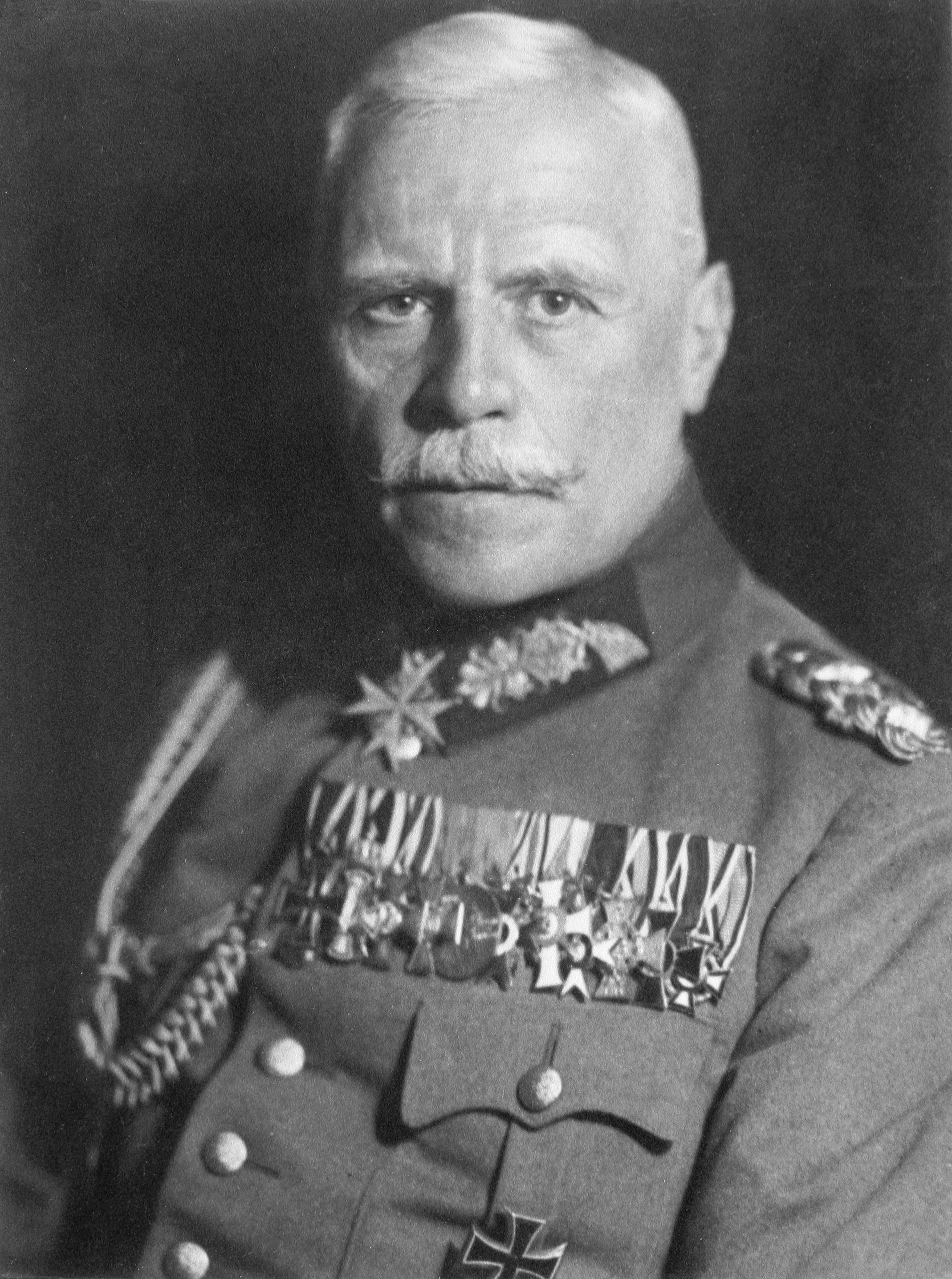
Max Ludwig after his appointment as General of the Artillery (1929)

Max Heinrich Ludwig (26 March 1871 – 28 January 1961) was a German General of the Artillery and served from 1926 to 1929 as chief of the Waffenamt.

== Life ==
Ludwig was born on 26 March 1871 in Sangerhausen. Ludwig joined the Lower Saxony Foot Artillery Regiment No. 10 of the Prussian Army in Strasbourg on 1 April 1891 as a flag cadet and was promoted to lieutenant on 18 June 1892. On 18 October 1892 he was transferred to the Hohenzollern Foot Artillery Regiment No. 13 in Ulm. In October 1894 he was assigned to the artillery school in Berlin for further training. He remained here until 31 July 1896, after which he was employed as an adjutant in his regiment. From 1 October 1898 to 20 July 1901, Ludwig was commanded to the Prussian Staff College and promoted to lieutenant on 16 June 1901. From 1 April 1903, he was initially assigned to the General Staff and was transferred here on 20 March 1906, while being promoted to captain. He then moved on 27 January 1907 to the General Staff of the Governorate of Metz, and became a battery commander back in his regiment on 3 April 1909. On 1 April 1912, he was transferred once more to the General Staff, promoted to Major on 1 October 1912, and assigned to the General Staff of the 33rd Division on 10 March 1914.

With the outbreak of World War I, he took part in the border battles on the western front with the division. On 24 December 1914 he was named Ia (Chief of Operations) of the XXXIX Reserve Corps. On 1 June 1916, Ludwig was assigned to the Army Group Prince Leopold of Bavaria in the same function on the Eastern Front and was also deployed here after his transfer to Army Group Woyrsch on September 5, 1916. He was appointed chief of staff of the XXXVIII Reserve Corps on 6 January 1917, then filled the same post for Army Group G on 23 April 1917, and from 11 December headed the staff of General Command 59. He ended World War I as Chief of Staff of the XXI Army Corps.

Afterwards, Ludwig was initially Chief of the General Staff of the Governorate of Graudenz and, from 1 October 1919, Chief of the General Staff of the Military District Command II in Stettin, before being appointed Chief of the General Staff of the Fortress of Königsberg on 28 March 1920. Here he was promoted to colonel on 18 December 1920 and, after joining the Reichswehr, was appointed commander of the Königsberg Fortress on 1 May 1921. Ludwig moved to the Reichswehr Ministry in Berlin on 1 July 1923, where he took on the post of Inspector of Engineers and Fortresses (In 5). As such, he became a major general on 1 February 1925. On 1 March 1926, he was appointed Chief of the Army Weapons Office in the Reich Ministry of Defense and on 1 November 1927, he was promoted to Lieutenant General.

Ludwig was retired from the army on 31 May 1929, while he was promoted to General of the Artillery. During his retirement, he worked as a military writer e.g. as chief editor of the Wehrtechnischen Monatshefte Bulletin in the publishing house E.S. Agent & son active. From 1932 he lived in Thal (Thuringia), where his tomb is located in the park of the "Haus Felseneck". Ludwig was a member of the Christian Democratic Union of Germany in the GDR.

The politician and career officer Günther Ludwig was his son.

He died in Gotha on 28 January 1961.

== Awards ==
- Order of the Red Eagle IV Class on 21 January 1912
- Iron Cross (1914) II Class on 10 September 1914
- Iron Cross (1914) I Class on 15 November 1914
- House Order of Hohenzollern with swords on 27 September 1916
- Order of the Crown (Württemberg) with swords on 15 October 1916
- Military Merit Order (Bavaria) III Class on 29 January 1917
- War Merit Cross (Lippe) on 1 April 1917
- Hanseatic Cross Hamburg on 16 May 1917
- Knight's Cross 1st Class of the Order of Albrecht with Swords on 20 June 1917
- Military Merit Cross (Austria-Hungary) III Class with the war decoration in September 1917
- Pour le Mérite on 5 July 1918
- Preußisches Dienstverdienstkreuz on 22 June 1920

== Publications (Selections) ==
- Die Strategie Moltkes – ein System der Aushülfen. In: Militär-Wochenblatt. 1901, 86. Jhg., Nr. 114.
- Taktische Betrachtungen über den Angriff auf befestigte Feldstellungen., Beiheft zum Militär-Wochenblatt. 8. Jhg., Heft 1903.
- Die Festung in den Kriegen Napoleons und der Neuzeit. In: Militär-Wochenblatt. 1905, 90. Jhg., Nr. 23.
- Geschichte des Hohenzollernschen Fußartillerieregiments Nr. 13., 1905, im Eigenverlag des Regiments
- Vorposten im Festungskriege. In: Militär-Wochenblatt. 1910, 95. Jhg., Nr. 71 und 72.
- Der Balkankrieg 1912/13. 1914, Kriegsgeschichtliche Einzelschriften, Sonderabdruck in den Vierteljahresheften für Truppenführung und Heereskunde, herausgegeben vom Großen Generalstab, Heft 50 (160 Seiten, 6 Karten, 8 Ansichtsskizzen)
- Ein Rückblick auf die Munitionsversorgung des Feldheeres im Weltkriege. Sonderabdruck in Militärwissenschaftliche Rundschau. 1941, Heft 4.
