= Military Merit Order =

Military Merit Order may refer to:

- Military Merit Order (Bavaria)
- Military Merit Order (Württemberg)

== See also ==
- Military Merit Cross (disambiguation)
- Military Merit Medal (disambiguation)
- Order of Military Merit (disambiguation)
