= Schloss Hausen (Oberaula) =

German castle and stately home in Oberaula

Coordinates: 50°50′38″N 9°27′28″E

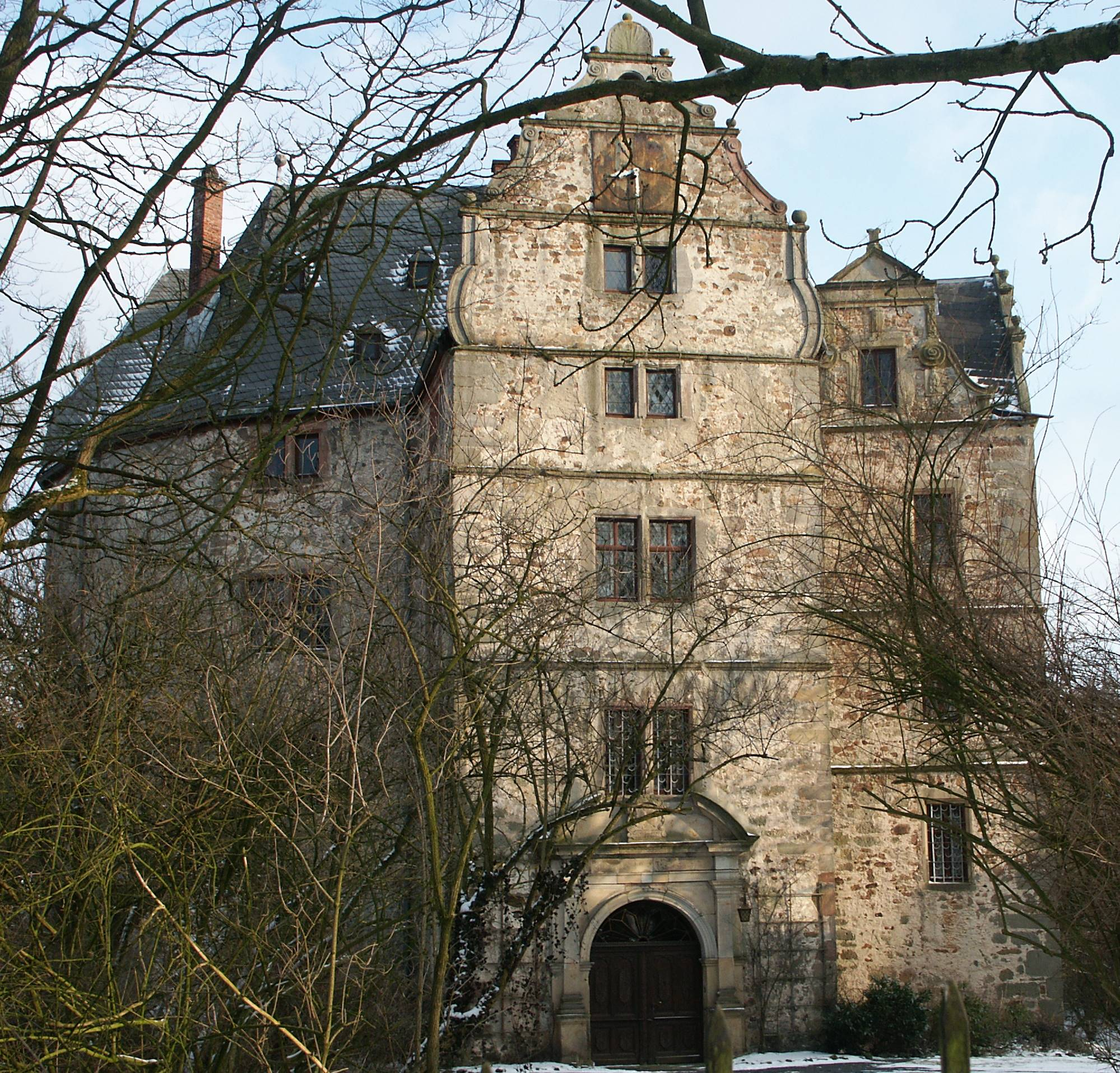
The Renaissance north gate of the Schloss.

Schloss Hausen is a German castle and stately home in Oberaula.
