= Merit Cross for War Aid =

Merit Cross for War Aid Verdienstkreuz für Kriegshilfe
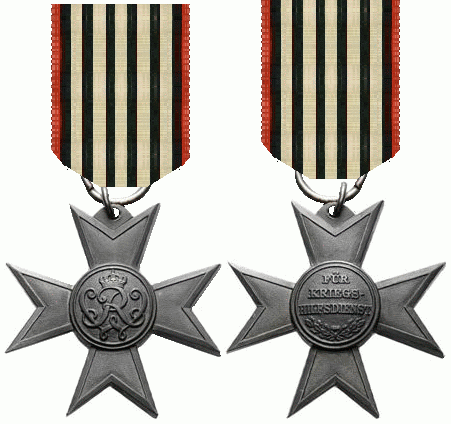
- Obverse and reverse of the Merit Cross for War Aid
- Type: Military and civil decoration
- Awarded for: Act contributing to the war effort
- Presented by: Prussia
- Campaign: World War I
- Status: Suppressed 1924
- Established: 5 December 1916
- Ribbon of the cross

Order of Wear 1916
- Next (higher): Life Saving Medal
- Next (lower): Peacetime awards of the Orders of Hohenzollern, Red Eagle, and Crown

The Merit Cross for War Aid (German: Verdienstkreuz für Kriegshilfe) was a war decoration of Prussia awarded during World War I. Instituted 5 December 1916, the cross was awarded for patriotic war aid service, without regard to status or rank.

== Appearance ==
The Merit Cross for War Aid is in the shape of a Maltese cross, typically found made of blackened Kriegsmetall alloy. The obverse of the cross bears a circular central medallion with the crowned cipher of King Wilhelm II. On the reverse the central medallion is inscribed FÜR KRIEGS-HILFSDIENST (For War Aid Merit) above an oak wreath. To the upper arm is attached a loop for suspension from its ribbon.
