= Warrior Merit Medal =

Warrior Merit Medal Krieger-Verdienstmedaille
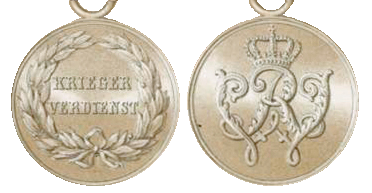
- Warrior Merit Medal, 1872 version
- Type: Military decoration
- Awarded for: Military merit
- Description: 25 millimeters diameter silver medal
- Country: Prussia
- Presented by: Prussia
- Eligibility: Troops not in Prussian Army military service
- Motto: Krieger Verdienst
- Status: Obsolete
- Established: 1835
- First award: 1835
- Final award: 1918
- Original ribbon (1835-1872) Combatant's ribbon (1872-1918) Non-combatant's ribbon (1888-1918)

The Warrior Merit Medal (German: Krieger-Verdienstmedaille) was a military decoration of Prussia. Established by Friedrich Wilhelm III, it was primarily awarded to troops not in Prussian Army military service. The first recipients were members of the Imperial Guard grenadier company guarding the Russian imperial residence during Friedrich Whilhelm's visit to St. Petersburg in 1835.

== Appearance ==
Both versions of the medal are circular and silver, 25 mm in diameter. The first version medal 1835 for Russian soldiers had depicts the crowned cypher of Friedrich Wilhelm III on the obverse of the medal. The reverse bears the inscription KRIEGER VERDIENST (Warrior Merit) surrounded by a wreath of two laurel sprigs, tied at its base with a bow. The medal is suspended by a ring suspension and hangs from the ribbon of the Order of the Red Eagle.

The later version of the medal 1873 depicts the crowned cipher of King Wilhelm I on the obverse. The reverse is also inscribed KRIEGER VERDIENST and surrounded by a thicker laurel wreath than the early version. The medal is suspended by a ring suspension and hangs from the black with white stripes kämpferband (combatants ribbon) or the white with black stripe nichtkämpferband (non-combatants ribbon).
