= Merit Cross =

Merit Cross Verdienstkreuz
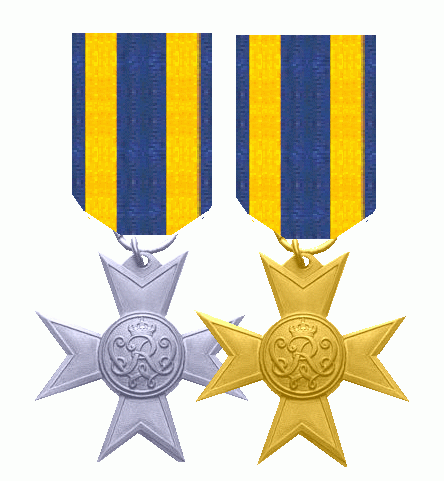
- Awarded for: Meritorious service to the Kingdom of Prussia
- Presented by: Prussia
- Eligibility: Military personnel or civilians
- Established: 27 January 1912
- Ribbon of the cross

Order of Wear
- Next (higher): Prussian Red Cross Medal 2nd Class or Orders of non-Prussian States subordinate to Prussia if officers wore that state’s cockade (Merit Cross in Gold)
- Next (lower): Cross of the General Honor Decoration (Merit Cross in Silver)

The Merit Cross (German: Verdienstkreuz) was a meritorious service decoration of Prussia. Established 27 January 1912, by Wilhelm II in his capacity as King of Prussia, it recognized general merit to Prussia. The cross could be awarded to civilians as well as members of the military. The cross was awarded in two classes a gold cross and a silver cross.

== Classes ==
The Merit Cross was awarded as a Gold Merit Cross or Silver Merit Cross, the gold being ranked the higher of the two. For exceptional service each class could be awarded with a crown, meaning that the cross would be surmounted by a crown and the ribbon attached through it. Awards which commemorated a long period of service could be awarded with a circular shield bearing a jubilee number attached at the top of the cross, and holding the suspension ring.

The Merit Cross was to be returned to the state upon the award of a higher level decoration. An exception to this was if the Silver Cross of Merit was awarded with crown, it did not have to be returned if the recipient was later awarded the Gold Cross of Merit. All awards of the Merit Cross were to be returned to the state upon the death of the recipient.

== Appearance ==
The Merit Cross is a 41 mm wide Maltese cross with smooth edges and pebbled texture on the arms. In the center is a circular medallion with the stylized crowned cypher WR for King Wilhelm II. The obverse and reverse designs are identical. The Gold Merit Cross is gilded silver, while the Silver Merit Cross was made of silver or silver-plated bronze.

The crosses were hung with a ring suspension attached at the top arm of the cross. When awarded with the Crown or jubilee numbers shield, those were attached at the top arm of the cross and the suspension ring attached to the crown or shield. The cross was worn suspended from a ribbon of blue with yellow stripes.
