= Military Honor Medal =

Military Honor Medal Militär-Ehrenzeichen
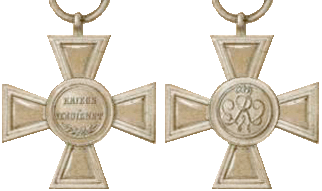
- 1864 version of the Military Honor Medal, 1st Class
- Type: Two class military decoration
- Awarded for: Merit in wartime
- Presented by: Prussia
- Status: No longer awarded
- Established: 1814
- Final award: 1918
- Combatants ribbon 1814-1918 Non-combatants ribbon 1864-1918

Order of Wear 1916
- Next (higher): Military Merit Cross
- Next (lower): Russian Order of St. George, 4th Class

The Military Honor Medal (German: Militär-Ehrenzeichen) was a two-class military decoration awarded by the Kingdom of Prussia. The medal was awarded to military personnel from the rank of sergeant and below. Established in 1814, it replaced the Gold Military Merit Medal of 1806 (Goldene Militär-Verdienstmedaille), with a medal in the shape of a cross silver cross for the 1st class while the Silver Military Medal of 1806 (Silberne Militär-Verdienstmedaille) became the 2nd class with minor changes in design.

Initial award criteria meant that in order to be awarded the 1st Class cross a recipient must have been awarded the 2nd Class medal first, much like the requirements for the General Honor Decoration. The Military Honor Medal and General Honor Decoration developed in a side-by-side manner in their first years of award. They utilized the same cross and medal for their first few years until the General Honor Decoration, 1st Class became the 4th Class of the Order of the Red Eagle in 1830. Even after this change the General Honor Decoration, 2nd Class and Military Honor Medal, 2nd Class utilized the same medal until 1864 when the Military Honor Medal, 2nd Class was redesigned at the same time as the Military Honor Medal, 1st Class.

The Military Honor Medal was typically awarded during wars when the Iron Cross was not. These conflicts included the wars of German Unification such as the Revolutions of 1848 in the German states, Second Schleswig War in 1864, and Austro-Prussian War in 1866. Awards for military conflicts in the German colonial empire were made from 1896-1906. The Military Honor Medal could also be awarded to foreign troops, an example being 52 awards to Russian soldiers for service in China in 1902.

== 1814 version ==
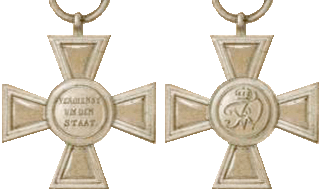
Military Honor Medal, 1st Class 1814

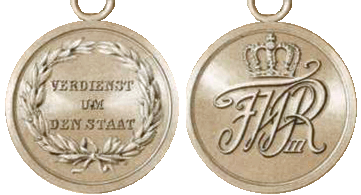
Military Honor Medal, 2nd Class 1814

The 1814 version of the cross and medal shared the same design as the Honor Decoration, the only difference between the awards at that time was the color of ribbon suspending the cross. The General Honor Decoration for civil merit was suspended from a white with orange striped ribbon, while the Military Honor Medal was suspended from a black ribbon with white stripes.

The 1st class was a silver 36 mm cross pattée with a center medallion. The obverse of the medallion bore the inscription VERDIENST UM DEN STAAT (Merit for the State) in three lines, while the reverse bore the crowned cypher of Friedrich Wilhelm III, the founder of the award. The 2nd class was a 39 mm circular silver medal also bearing the inscription VERDIENST UM DEN STAAT on its obverse, surrounded by a laurel wreath, with the reverse depicting a large crowned cypher of Friedrich Wilhelm III.

In 1830, the General Honor Decoration, 1st class, became the Fourth Class of the Order of the Red Eagle, with the medallion in the center of the cross being replaced by an enamelled insignia of the Order of the Red Eagle. This design change ended the identical paralleling of the designs of the General Honor Decoration and Military Honor Medal.

== 1864 version ==
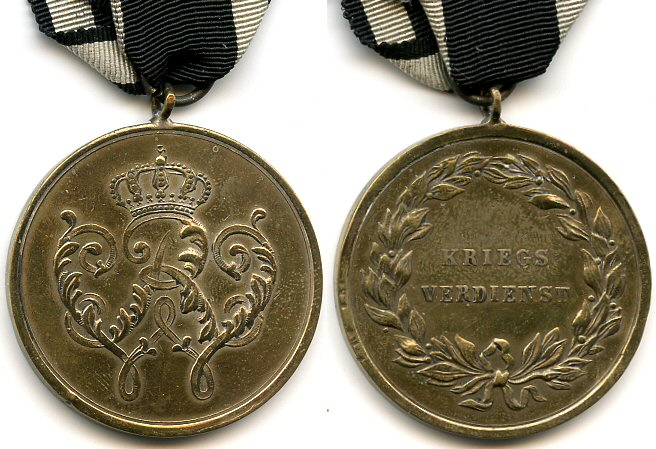
1864 version of the Military Honor Medal, 2nd Class

In 1864, King Wilhelm I reauthorized the Military Honor Medal for award with a redesign of the 1st class cross and a 2nd class medal. This came about at the same time as the higher ranking Military Merit Cross, a gold or silver gilt version of the same cross. This new authorization also changed the criteria of the medal, meaning it was no longer necessary to be awarded the 2nd class medal before the 1st class cross.

The 1st class cross was still in the form of a silver cross pattée, but the design of the obverse and reverse medallion changed. The obverse now bore the inscription KRIEGS VERDIENST (War Merit) above a spray of laurel leaves, while the reverse bore the crowned cypher of King Wilhelm.

The 2nd class medal was still in the form of a circular medal but also gained the updated obverse inscription KRIEGS VERDIENST, with its obverse bearing the crowned cypher of King Wilhelm.
