= Lifesaving Medal (Prussia) =

Lifesaving Medal Rettungsmedaille
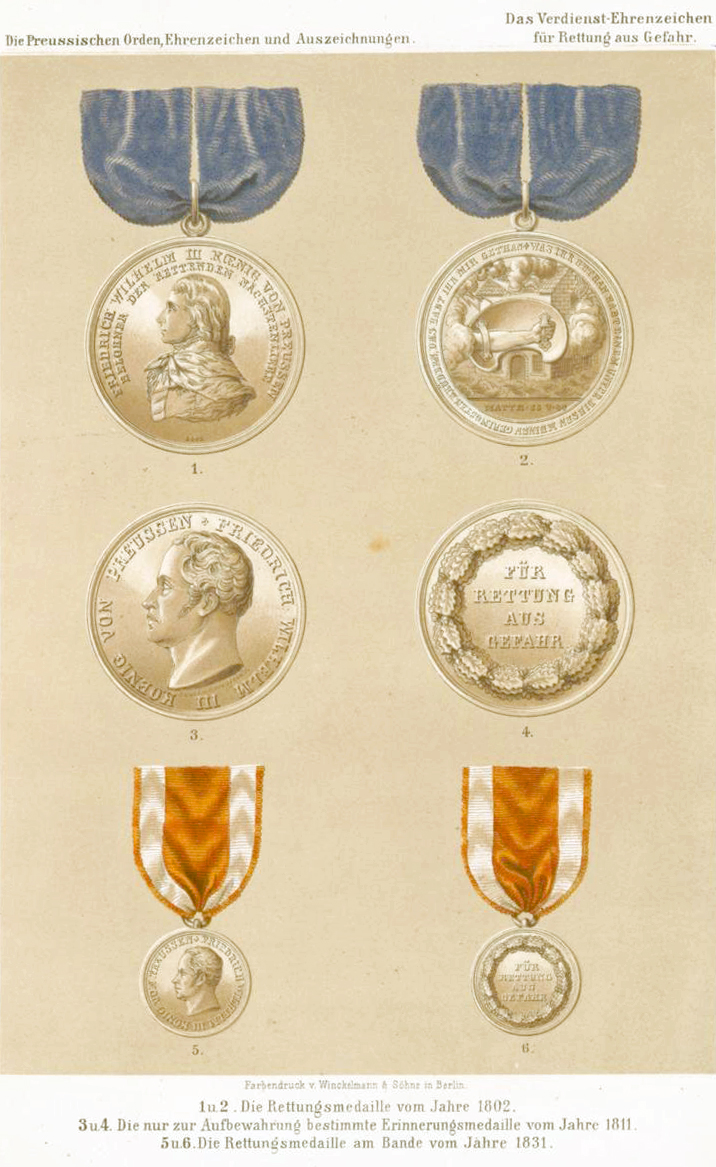
- Versions of the Kingdom of Prussia's Lifesaving Medals
- Type: Civil decoration
- Awarded for: Saving a life
- Presented by: Kingdom of Prussia; Free State of Prussia
- Status: No longer awarded
- Established: 1 February 1833
- Final award: 1925/1936
- Ribbon of the medal

Order of Wear 1916
- Next (lower): Merit Cross for War Aid

The Lifesaving Medal (German: Rettungsmedaille am Band) was a civil decoration of the Kingdom of Prussia. The medal was worn on an orange ribbon with white side stripes on the left side of the chest.

== History ==
Established 1 February 1833, it was awarded to individuals who had saved another person's life, at risk to their own. This medal is referred to as the Lifesaving Medal on Band to differentiate it from a previous non-portable award established in 1802. Otto von Bismarck received it for rescuing a drowning man.

An early recipient was Prince Friedrich Karl Nikolaus of Prussia, who received the medal in 1847 for rescuing a child from the Rhine near Bonn. Other notable recipients include Helmuth Karl Bernhard von Moltke, Siegfried Thomaschki, Ernst Zinna, and the fighter pilot Oswald Boelcke, who rescued a French boy from a canal. Hans Pfundtner received it in 1899 as a first-semester student at the University of Königsberg. Victor Caillé received it three times.

=== Free State of Prussia ===
In the Free State of Prussia, a successor model was established by the Ministry of the Interior on 9 June 1925, which was awarded until 1936. It consisted of a rescue medal (wearable) and a commemorative medal for rescue from danger (non-wearable). The establishment of a rescue medal for the German Reich had failed during the Weimar Republic.

=== National Socialist Germany ===
In the Third Reich, following the Prussian model, a rescue medal on a ribbon (wearable) and a commemorative medal for rescue from danger (non-wearable) were established by the Reich President on 22 June 1933.
