= Hanoverian Waterloo Medal =

Medal for Hanoverian Veterans of the Battle of Waterloo

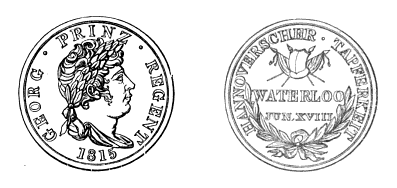
Hanoverian Waterloo Medal

The Hanoverian Waterloo Medal was issued to all members of the Hanoverian Army who served during the Waterloo campaign, between 16–18 June 1815.

== History ==
The Hanoverian Waterloo Medal, like the British Waterloo Medal, has a profile and laureate head of the Prince Regent to the right, with the legend "GEORG. PRINZ. REGENT, 1815", around it.

On the reverse are two branches of laurel and a breastplate, with two spears and two colours crossed on either side; underneath is the date, "WATERLOO JUN. XVIII.", and, above, in Roman letters, "HANNOVERSCHER TAPFERKEIT" (lit. 'Hanoverian Bravery'). The soldier's name and regiment are impressed on the rim.

It is suspended by a crimson ribbon with light blue borders. The recipient was permitted to wear the ribbon without the medal, contrary to the rule which prevailed in Britain at the time.

It was authorised by George, the Prince Regent in December 1817, and was awarded to every soldier in the Hanoverian Army who was present during the battles of Quatre Bras and Waterloo 16–18 June 1815, (Note: Like the British medal those stationed with in reserve at Hal, such as members of Lyons's 6th Hanoverian Infantry Brigade, were also entitled to it.) and survived. If the soldier left military service, he was still allowed to wear the medal. After the death of the recipient it was ordered that it should remain in his family as an heirloom.

The Hanoverian troops, excluding those of the King's German Legion, present on the 16, 17 and 18 June at Battle of Quatre Bras and Waterloo, under the command of General Charles Alten, amounted to almost 16,900 men, equivalent to 18% of Wellington's Allied Army.

== Gallery ==
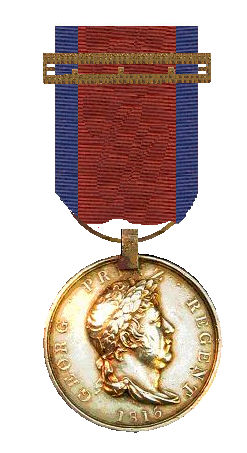
The medal with ribbon

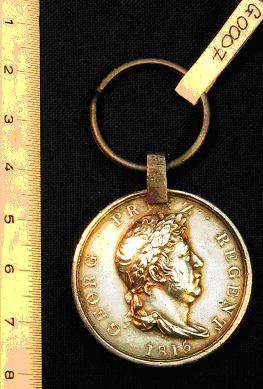
Front

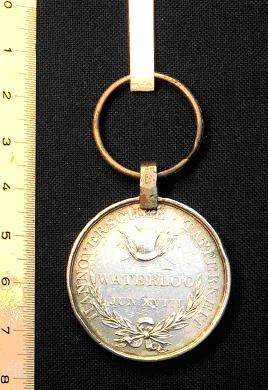
Reverse

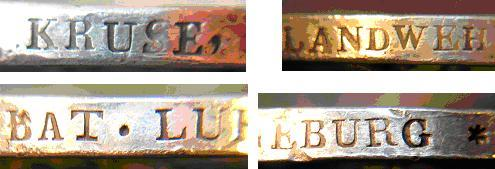
Rim

Ribbon

== Recipients ==
- James Frederick Lyon

== See also ==
Five nations of Seventh Coalition struck medals for soldiers who took part in the campaign:

1. British Waterloo Medal (British Army and King's German Legion)
2. Brunswick Waterloo Medal
3. Hanoverian Waterloo Medal
4. Nassau Waterloo Medal
5. Prussian Waterloo Medal
