= Cross of the Mount of Olives =

Cross of the Mount of Olives Ölberg-Kreuz
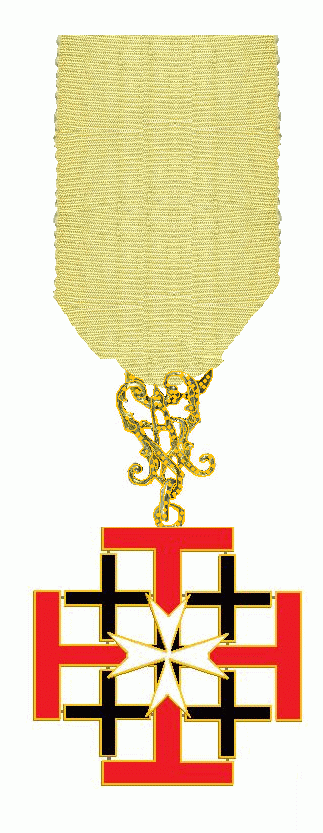
- Cross of the Mount of Olives
- Country: Prussia
- Established: 24 December 1909
- Ribbon of the cross

Order of Wear 1916
- Next (higher): Jerusalem Cross
- Next (lower): 1861 Coronation Medal

The Cross of the Mount of Olives (German: Ölberg-Kreuz) was a Prussian award which was founded on 24 December 1909, by the Prussian Prince Eitel Friedrich of Prussia as a decoration to commemorate the foundation of a hospital, the Kaiserin Auguste Victoria-Stiftung (literally, "Empress Augusta Victoria Foundation, better known today as Augusta Victoria Hospital) on the Biblical Mount of Olives in Jerusalem. His very devout mother, Augusta Victoria of Schleswig-Holstein, was fond of charitable works and built several churches.

Emperor Wilhelm II of Germany and his wife, Auguste Victoria, had visited Jerusalem in 1898. They had pledged to build a hospital for Christian pilgrims suffering from malaria.

On 27 January 1907, the entire imperial family, both parents and all their seven children, signed the charter of the Ölbergstiftung. The foundation stone was laid in that same year.

The Cross of the Mount of Olives was awarded to gentleman and ladies who contributed to the Foundation. The formidable sum of 2.5 million marks was pledged by the German population.

The Augusta Victoria Hospital opened its doors in 1910. The elaborate Protestant Ascension Church (Himmelfahrtkirche), usually subsumed under the hospital's name as "Augusta Victoria", was finished in 1914.

== The cross ==
The badge of the decoration is a red-and-black enamelled "Jerusalem cross", upon which is imposed the white cross of the Johanniterorden, the evangelical noblemen's society which Prince Eitel Friedrich then headed as grand master (Herrenmeister). The badge is suspended from a monogram of the Empress's initials, "AV". The ribbon is plain white. The deserving were awarded golden or silver-gilt Crosses.
