= Military Merit Medal (Lippe) =

Imperial German military decoration

Military Merit Medal (Lippe) (German: Militär-Verdienstmedaille)
- Type: Military decoration
- Awarded for: Meritorious service
- Description: Round bronze medal
- Country: German Empire
- Presented by: Principality of Lippe
- Eligibility: Military personnel
- Campaigns: Napoleonic wars World War I
- Status: No longer awarded
- Established: 16 May 1832
- First award: 1832
- Final award: 1918

Highlights
- Total: 147 of the 1832 design 1,946 of the 1914 redesign

Precedence
- Next (higher): War Merit Cross

The Military Merit Medal (Lippe) (German: Militär-Verdienstmedaille), later the Military Merit Medal with Swords (Militär-Verdienstmedaille mit Schwerten) was a military decoration for meritorious service by the military personnel of the Principality of Lippe, a member state of the German Confederation, the North German Confederation and the German Empire. The medal was issued in two different designs between 1832 and 1918. It ceased to be awarded after the fall of the Lippe monarchy at the end of World War I.

== Establishment and duration ==
On 16 May 1832, Prince Leopold II originally instituted the Military Merit Medal by a royal decree, to recognize meritorious service that had taken place during the Napoleonic wars. Issuance of the medal was suspended in 1888. The medal was revived on 25 October 1908 by Prince Leopold IV. On 17 December 1914, it underwent an alteration in design with the addition of the image of crossed swords, and it was issued in this form throughout the remainder of World War I. The monarchy of Lippe was overthrown on 11 November 1918 during the German revolution of 1918–1919 that followed Germany's defeat in the war, and the medal ceased to be issued.

== Eligibility ==
The medal was intended to reward individuals who, through a long and honorable period of service, distinction in campaigns, or in any other manner, rendered meritorious service to the military. The medal was initially awarded almost exclusively to military officers and other high-ranking officials. After the medal was revived in October 1908, eligibility was extended to non-commissioned officers and enlisted personnel as well. In October 1914, this was subsequently expanded to include those men of the second battalion of Infantry Regiment 55 (6th Westphalian) who, as citizens of the Principality of Lippe, had become unfit for service due to wounds or an illness contracted in the field, and who had not received — nor had been recommended for — the Iron Cross, 2nd class.

== Description ==
This was a circular bronze medal, 36 mm in diameter. It weighed just over 21 grams and was 3-mm-thick. It had a round ball eyelet soldered to the top for attachment of a ribbon ring.

Obverse: In the center, were the intertwined letters "PAL" in an ornate script, the monogram of the founder, Prince Paul Alexander Leopold (Leopold II). The monogram was surmounted by the image of the princely crown. Beneath the monogram, arranged in a semicircle, was the inscription DEM MILITAIR-VERDIENSTE (For Military Merit) in capital letters. The outer edge was framed by two oak branches, tied at the bottom with a ribbon. The design change of 17 December 1914 added the image of two crossed antique swords to the obverse, positioned within the oak branches, below the monogram and inscription. The medal now officially was referred to as the Military Merit Medal with Swords.

Reverse: The reverse side displayed the five-petaled Rose of Lippe, surrounded by two laurel branches tied at the bottom with a ribbon. The manufacturer's information "G. LOOS DIR." appeared in small print below the laurel's ribbon. With the 1914 design change, the manufacturer's information was no longer included.

The medal was originally produced by the company of medalist and mint master Gottfried Bernhard Loos in Berlin, and later by the company of goldsmith and jeweler Carl Büsch in Hanover. After the 1914 redesign, engraving and manufacture were handled by C.F. Zimmermann of Pforzheim.

== Ribbon and placement ==
The medal was worn on the left breast, suspended by a 41 mm silk ribbon. The ribbon was poppy red (ponceaurot) with a 1.5-mm-wide golden-yellow stripe on each edge.

== Provisions for return ==
The original Military Merit Medal was subject to return after the death of the recipient. The Military Merit Medal with Swords was not subject to return after death, but if the recipient was later awarded the higher-ranked War Merit Cross, the merit medal was required to be returned at the award ceremony.

== Number awarded ==
The original Military Merit Medal was awarded 147 times between 22 May 1832 and 15 April 1915. After the design change, 1,946 of the Military Merit Medal with Swords were awarded during World War I.

== Sources ==
- Hessenthal, Waldemar von; Schreiber, Georg (2001). Honours and Awards of the German States. Naval & Military Press. ISBN 978-1-843-42144-3.
- Militärverdienstmedaille in the Orden und Ehrenzeichen auf Lippe-Detmold website.
- Militär-Verdienstmedaille Ausgabe von 1832 in the Ehrenzeichen-Orden website.
- Militär-Verdienstmedaille mit Schwertern 1914 (2. Prägung) in the Ehrenzeichen-Orden website.
