= Jerusalem Cross (Prussia) =

1898 German decoration

Jerusalem Cross Jerusalem-Kreuz
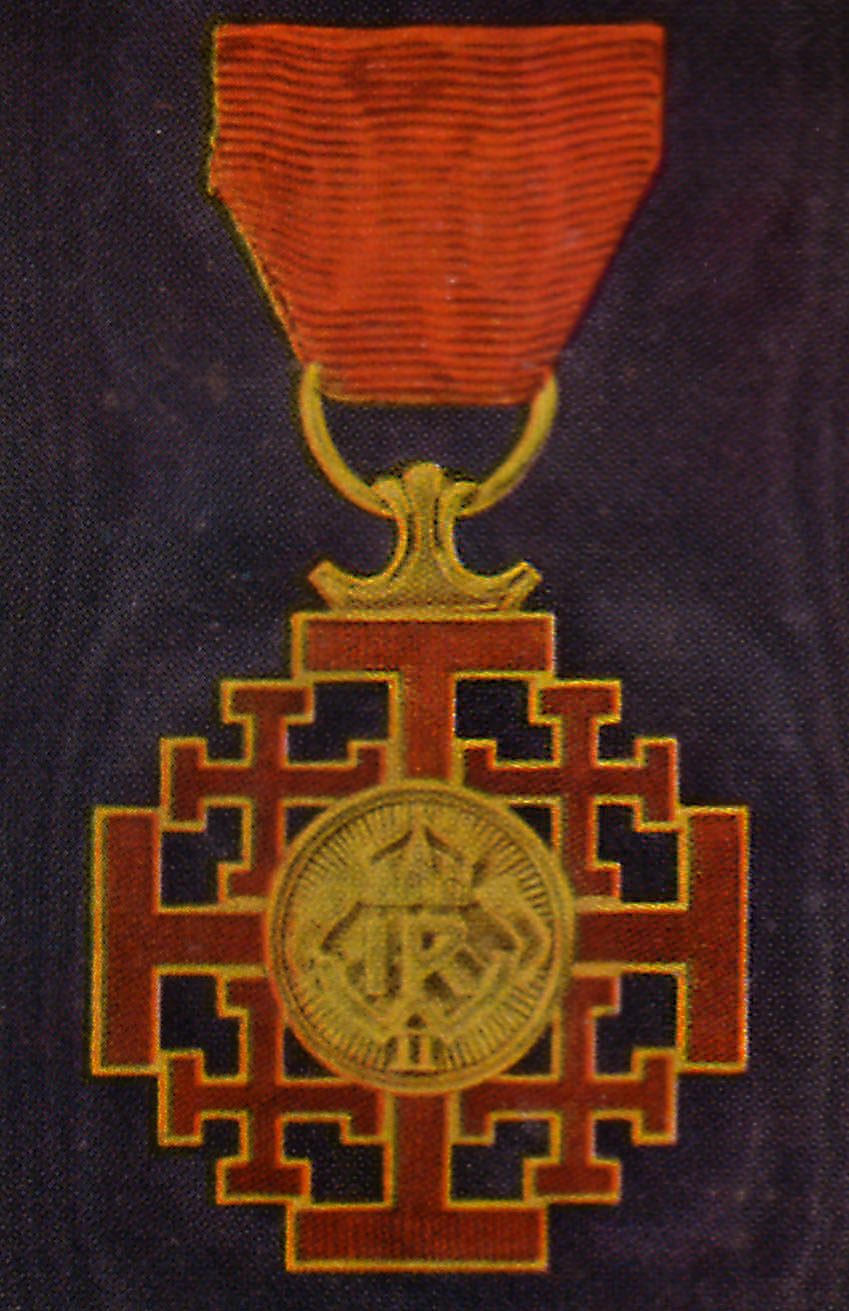
- The Jerusalem Cross
- Awarded for: The inauguration of the Lutheran Church of the Redeemer, Jerusalem
- Country: Prussia
- Eligibility: Those who traveled with Emperor Wilhelm II to Jerusalem in 1898
- Established: 31 October 1898
- Ribbon of the order

Order of Wear 1916
- Next (higher): Hohenzollern Commemorative Medal for Combatants
- Next (lower): Cross of the Mount of Olives

The Jerusalem Cross or Jerusalem Memorial Cross (German: Jerusalem-Kreuz; Jerusalem-Erinnerungskreuz) was a decoration of Prussia established 31 October 1898. The cross was awarded to those who traveled with Emperor Wilhelm II on his 1898 visit to the Levant and attended the inauguration of the Lutheran Church of the Redeemer, Jerusalem.

== Insignia ==
The Jerusalem Cross is made in the shape of the Jerusalem cross. The cross consists of a large cross portent with four plain crosslets between the arms. The crosses are red enameled with silver-gilt borders. In the center of the cross is a round gold colored medallion.

The obverse side, the medallion depicts the Imperial Crown of the Prussian German Emperor surmounting the letters IR (Imperator Rex) over the royal cypher of a stylized W II. The reverse of the medallion bears the date 31 October 1898. This date is depicted using a large Roman numeral X in the center for October, and a small Roman numeral XXXI at the top. To the left is MDCCC and to the right side IIC for the year 1898.

== See also ==
- Jerusalem Pilgrim's Cross
