= War Honor Medal =

Imperial German wartime decoration

War Honor Medal (German: Kriegs-Ehrenmedaille)
- War Honor Medal ribbon for battlefield service
- Type: Wartime decoration
- Awarded for: Meritorious wartime service
- Description: Octagonal gilded bronze medal
- Country: German Empire
- Presented by: Principality of Lippe
- Eligibility: Military and civilians
- Campaign: World War I
- Status: No longer awarded
- Established: 25 October 1915
- First award: 1915
- Final award: 1921

Highlights
- Total: 459 for battlefield service 1,249 for home front service

Precedence
- Next (higher): War Merit Cross

The War Honor Medal (German: Kriegs-Ehrenmedaille) was a wartime decoration of the Principality of Lippe, a member state of the German Empire. It was instituted in 1915 during World War I for meritorious service, rendered on either the battlefield or the home front, by either military personnel or civilians.

== Establishment and duration ==
The War Honor Medal was instituted on 25 October 1915 by a royal decree of Prince Leopold IV of Lippe. The monarchy of Lippe was overthrown on 12 November 1918 during the German revolution of 1918–1919 that followed Germany's defeat in the war. The last medals were issued in January 1921. The manufacturer of the medal was C.F. Zimmermann of Pforzheim in the Grand Duchy of Baden.

== Eligibility ==
The medal was awarded for meritorious service rendered either in enemy territory (Feindesland) or on the home front (Heimat). Recipients included men and women who had distinguished themselves in promoting the general welfare through loyal service, either in an official capacity or as volunteers, particularly through the care of wounded and sick soldiers or other work for the Red Cross.

== Description ==
The octagonal medal was made of gilded bronze. It was 3 mm thick and weighed 15.6 grams. It had a round ball eyelet soldered to the top for attachment of a ribbon ring. The medal measured 33.4 mm wide and 37.25 mm high with the eyelet.

Obverse: A depiction of the obverse of the War Merit Cross extended to the rim of the medal. (This was a stippled-textured cross pattée with the five-petaled Rose of Lippe in its center, surrounded by a laurel wreath that was tied at the bottom. The upper arm of the cross bore an ornate "L" in script, the monogram of Leopold IV, beneath the image of a crown; the lower arm bore the date 1914.) The fields between the arms of the depicted cross were recessed and smooth. There was a smooth, raised border around the edge.

Reverse: An inscription in raised capital letters was arranged in four lines: TREU BEWÄHRT / IN / SCHWERER ZEIT / 1915 (Faithfully Proven in Difficult Times 1915). A narrow beaded border ran along the edge.

== Ribbon and placement ==
The medal was worn on the left breast, suspended by a 35 mm ribbon. For service in enemy territory, the ribbon was golden-yellow with two 2-mm-wide poppy red side stripes and two 3-mm-wide white edge stripes. For service on the home front, the ribbon was white with poppy-red side stripes and golden-yellow edge stripes of the above dimensions. Women wore the medal on its ribbon formed in the shape of a bow.

== Number awarded ==
A total of 459 War Honor Medals were awarded for service in the face of the enemy, and 1,249 for service on the home front.

== Sources ==
- Hessenthal, Waldemar von; Schreiber, Georg (2001). Honours and Awards of the German States. Naval & Military Press. ISBN 978-1-843-42144-3.
- Kriegs-Ehrenmedaille in the Ehrenzeichen-Orden website.
- Kriegsehrenmedaille Lippe-Detmold in Orden und Ehrenzeichen aus Lippe-Detmold.
