= Wilhelmsorden =

Wilhelm Order Wilhelmsorden
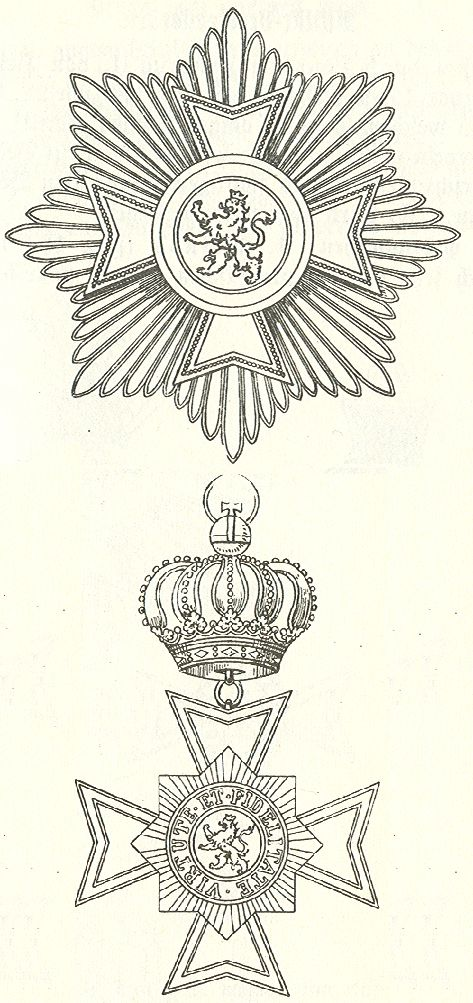
- Star and badge of the Wilhelmsorden of Hessen-Kassel

Awarded by Elector of Hesse
- Type: Order
- Motto: Virtuti et Fidelitate
- Grades: Grand Cross; Commander I Class; Commander II Class; Knight

Precedence
- Next (higher): House Order of the Golden Lion
- Next (lower): Order of the Iron Helmet
- Ribbon bar of the order

The Wilhelm Order ("Wilhelmsorden") of Hesse-Kassel (or Hesse-Cassel) was instituted by the Elector Friedrich Wilhelm I on 20 August 1851 as a civil and military Order of Merit. It was composed of the three lower grades of the Order of the Golden Lion and a Grand Cross was added. In total the order was awarded more than 450 times in the 16 years of its existence.

The motto of the Order was Virtuti et Fidelitate, and the ribbon was Carmine-red with red and white borders.

On 1 August 1866, Hesse-Kassel was annexed by Prussia and on 3 October of that same year the Hesse-Kassellian orders were incorporated into the Prussian system of honours. On 27 August 1875 the Order was abolished. Although there were no new awards by the Prussian Kings in the 1866–1875 era, the exiled Elector Friedrich Wilhelm I. awarded the order approximately 8 times until his death in 1875.

The Order is not to be confused with the exclusive

- Military Order of William of the Netherlands

or

- The Wilhelm-Orden of Prussia.
