= War Merit Cross (Saxony) =

War Merit Cross Kriegsverdienstkreuz
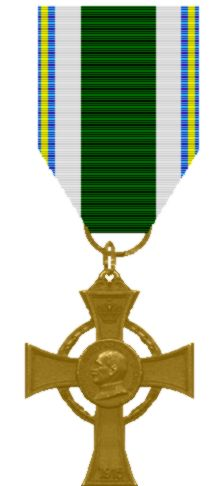
- Saxony War Merit Cross
- Type: Military decoration
- Presented by: Kingdom of Saxony
- Campaign: World War I
- Established: 30 October 1915
- Final award: 1918
- Ribbon of the Cross

The War Merit Cross (German: Kriegsverdienstkreuz) was a military decoration of the Kingdom of Saxony. Established 30 October 1915 by King Frederick Augustus III of Saxony, it was awarded for humanitarian and patriotic work towards the war effort.

== Appearance ==
The War Merit Cross is made of bronze and in the shape of a Latin cross pattée. Between the arms of the cross is a laurel wreath. The obverse bears a circular medallion in the center with the left facing effigy of King Friedrich August III. Circumscribed around the medallion is FRIEDRICH AUGUST KÖNIG V. SACHSEN. In the upper arm is the Saxon crown and the date 1915 on the lower arm. The reverse of the central medallion bears the crowned cipher of King Friedrich August III. The left arm is inscribed WELT- and the right arm inscribed KRIEG (World War).
