= Order of the Iron Helmet =

Order of the Hesse-Kassel

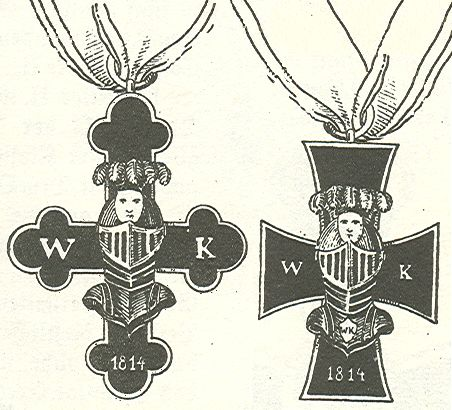
- The two editions of the cross. The one on the right is from 1815

Awarded by Elector of Hesse
- Type: Order
- Grades: Grand Cross; Knight I Class; Knight II Class

Precedence
- Next (higher): Wilhelmsorden
- Ribbon bar of the order

On 18 March 1814 Elector Wilhelm I of Hesse-Kassel (or Hesse-Cassel) founded the Order of the Iron Helmet (German: Orden vom Eisernen Helm).

Maximilian Gritzner describes the model and the statutes of the order as "influenced by the example of the Iron Cross".

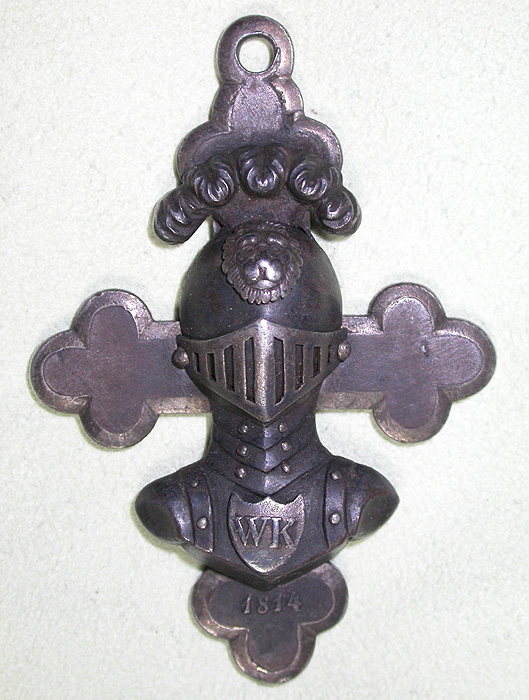
Order of the Iron Helmet
