= Waterloo Medal (Nassau) =

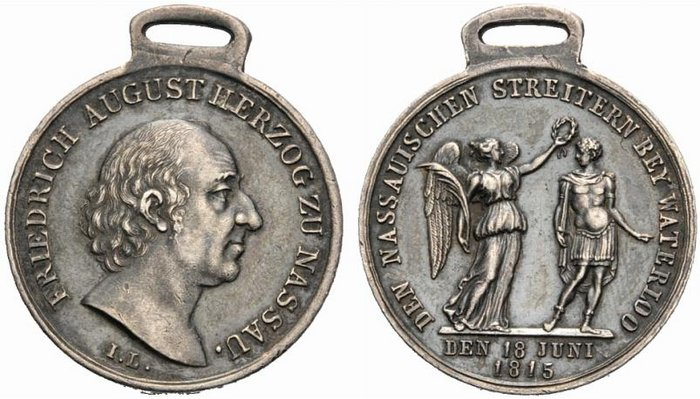
- Obverse and reverse of the Nassau Waterloo Medal
- Awarded for: Service in the Battle of Waterloo
- Presented by: The Duchy of Nassau
- Eligibility: Troops in service to Nassau
- Established: 23 December 1815

The Waterloo Medal of the Duchy of Nassau was established by Frederick Augustus, Duke of Nassau on 23 December 1815.

== Other Waterloo Medals ==
Five nations of Seventh Coalition struck medals for soldiers who took part in the campaign:

1. This medal for the officers and men of Nassau
2. Waterloo Medal for British and King's German Legion troops
3. Brunswick Waterloo Medal
4. Hanoverian Waterloo Medal
5. Prussian Waterloo Medal
