= General Honor Decoration (Prussia) =

General Honor Decoration Allgemeines Ehrenzeichen
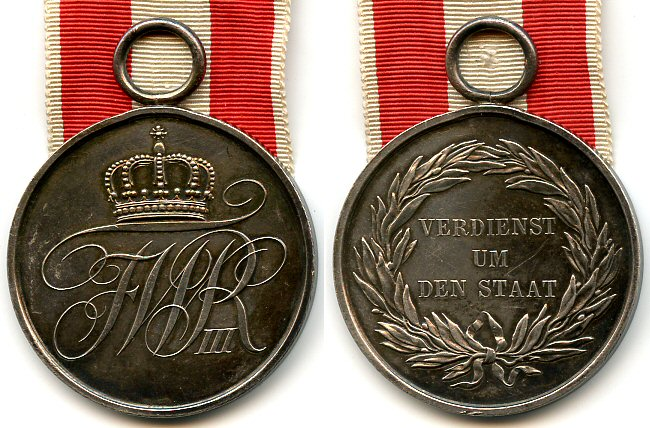
- General Honor Decoration, 2nd Class 1814 design
- Type: Civil decoration
- Awarded for: Merit in peacetime
- Presented by: Prussia
- Status: No longer awarded
- Established: 1810
- Final award: 1918
- General ribbon of the medal Ribbon of awards to Militär-Unterbeamter Ribbon of non-combat war merit and aid, Franco-Prussian War Ribbon of the Cross of the General Honor Decoration

Order of Wear 1916
- Next (higher): Merit Cross in Silver (Cross of the General Honor Decoration)
- Equivalent: Prussian XXV Service Cross (Cross of the General Honor Decoration)
- Related: Military Honor Medal

The General Honor Decoration (German: Allgemeines Ehrenzeichen) was a decoration of Prussia. The decoration can trace its origin back to awards established in 1793 by King Frederick William III of Prussia. The various levels of the decoration recognized peacetime merit to Prussia. These awards were often to commemorate long and particularly meritorious service or for special contributions from people who would not be considered for appointment to an order due to their rank. In general, recipients were lower and mid-level officials and officers.

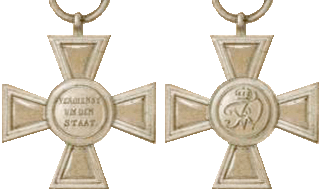
General Honor Decoration, 1st Class 1814 design

The General Honor Decoration originally consisted of a First Class medal in gold, and a Second Class medal in silver. After 1814, the gold medal was discontinued being replaced by a silver cross for the First Class. In January 1830, the cross was made into the Fourth Class of the Order of the Red Eagle, leaving only the silver medal for award. In 1890, a gold medal was reestablished as a higher level class. In 1900, the gold medal was replaced by the Cross of Honour of the General Honor Decoration, which was awarded along with the Second Class Medal, and a Third Class Medal in bronze established in 1912, until the fall Prussia in 1918.

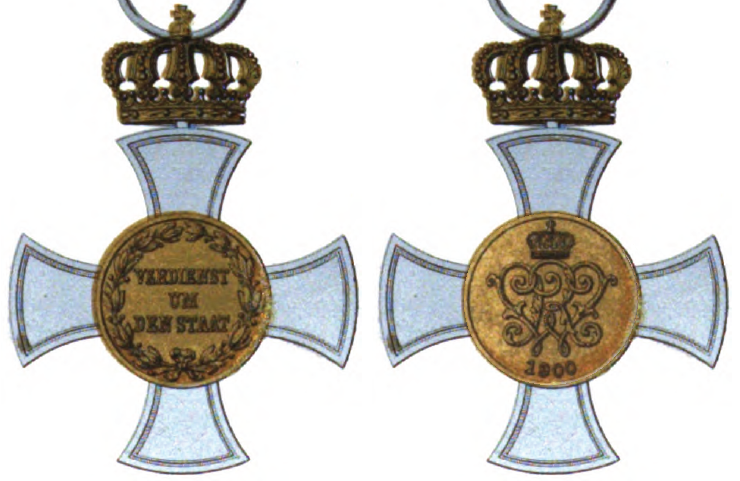
Cross of the General Honor Decoration, 1900

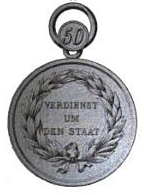
General Honor Decoration, 2nd Class with 50th anniversary shield
