= War Merit Cross (Lippe) =

War Merit Cross Kriegsverdienstkreuz
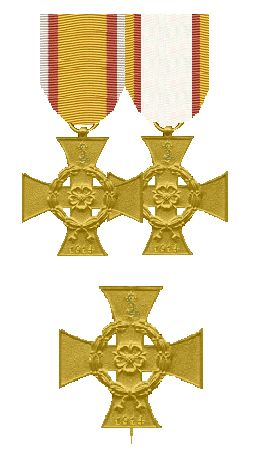
- Awarded for: Wartime combat and non-combat merit
- Presented by: Principality of Lippe
- Campaign: World War I
- Status: No longer awarded
- Established: 8 December 1914
- Final award: 1918

Highlights
- Total: approx. 18,000 combatant approx. 1,100 non-combatant

The War Merit Cross (German: Kriegsverdienstkreuz) was a military decoration of the Principality of Lippe. Established on 8 December 1914, by Leopold IV, Prince of Lippe, it could be awarded to combatants and to non-combatants for significant contributions to the war effort. The cross was awarded approximately 18,000 times to combatants and 1,100 times to non-combatants. An image depicting the War Merit Cross appeared on the obverse of Lippe's War Honor Medal.

== Appearance ==
The War Merit Cross is a gilded bronze cross pattée. On the obverse of the cross in the center is the Rose of Lippe surrounded by a laurel wreath. In the upper arm of the cross, at the top of the wreath is the crowned cipher of Leopold IV. The lower arm bears the date 1914. On the reverse are the words FÜR, AUSZEICHNUNG IM, KRIEGE (for distinction in wartime) inscribed in three lines respectively, on the upper, horizontal, and lower arms of the cross.

Awards to combatants have a yellow ribbon with red and white edges. Non-combat awards of the Cross hang from a white ribbon with edges of yellow and red.

== Notable recipients ==
- Leopold IV, Prince of Lippe
- Bernhard, Prince of Lippe
- Wilhelm II, German Emperor
- Wilhelm, German Crown Prince
- Prince Oskar of Prussia
- Rupprecht, Crown Prince of Bavaria
- Prince Leopold of Bavaria
- Prince Franz of Bavaria
- Archduke Friedrich, Duke of Teschen
- Joachim von Amsberg
- Georg Arnhold
- Werner von Blomberg
- Carl Clewing
- Theodor Duesterberg
- Wilhelm Heye
- Paul von Hindenburg
- Max Hoffmann
- Hermann von Kuhl
- Erich Ludendorff
- Max Ludwig
- Georg Alexander von Müller
- Manfred von Richthofen
- Gerd von Rundstedt
- Friedrich Graf von der Schulenburg
- Walter Stennes
- Rudolf Stöger-Steiner von Steinstätten
- Jürgen Stroop
