= Waterloo Medal (Brunswick) =

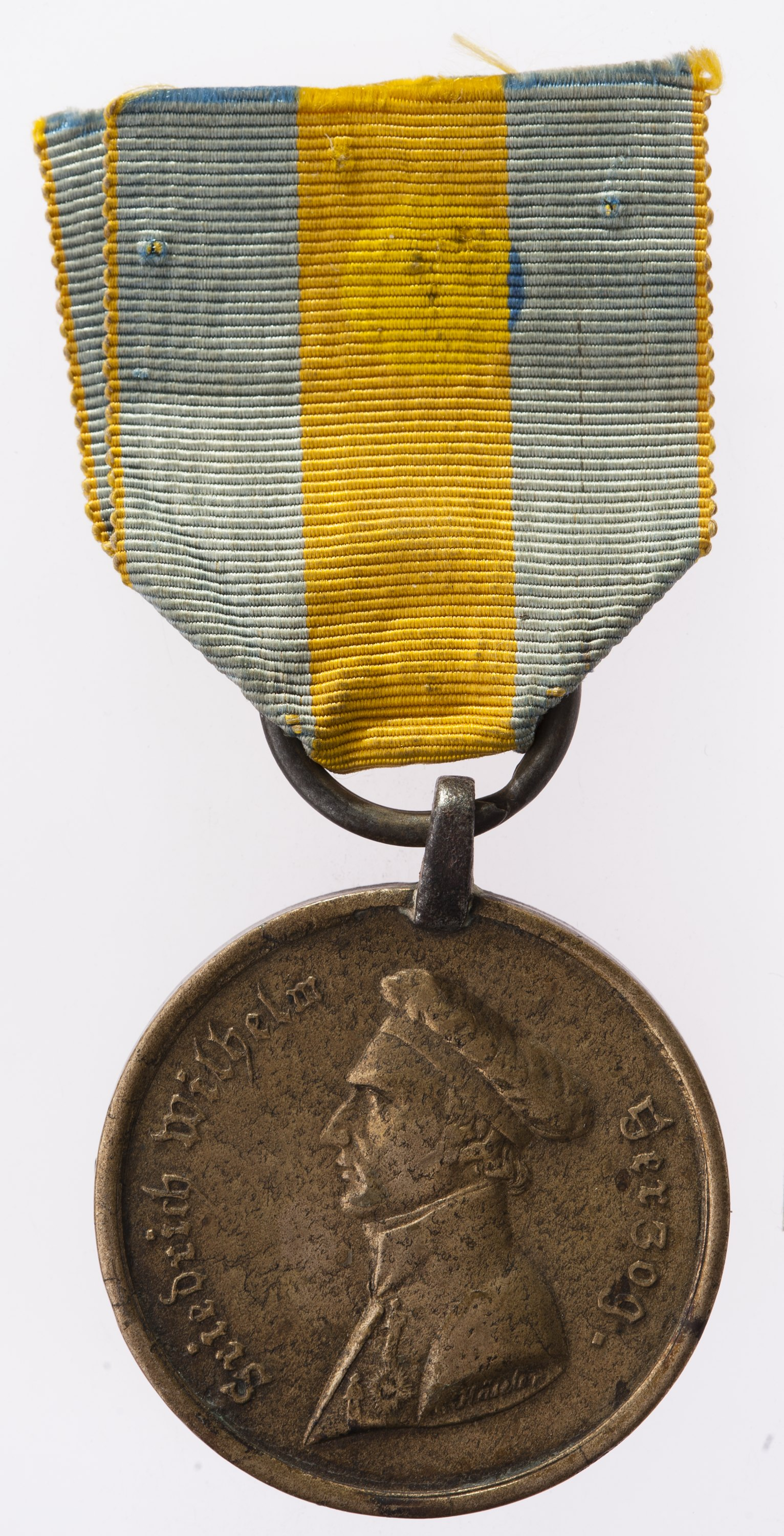
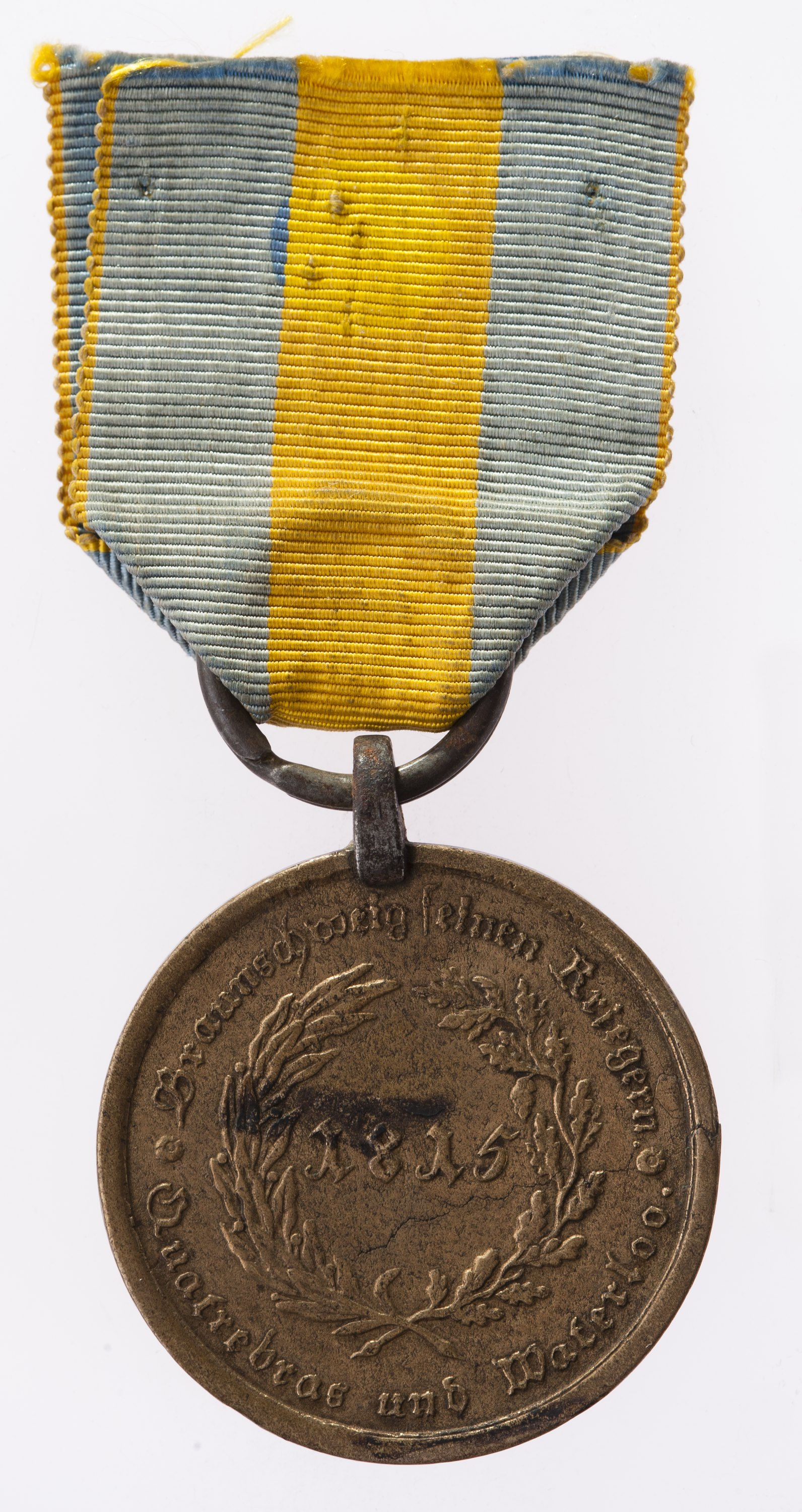
- Obverse (left) and reverse (right) of the Brunswick Waterloo Medal
- Type: Campaign medal
- Awarded for: Service in the Waterloo Campaign from 15 June to 7 July 1815.
- Presented by: Duchy of Brunswick
- Eligibility: Officers and soldiers of Brunswick
- Established: 11 June 1818

The Waterloo Medal was a campaign medal of the Duchy of Brunswick. The medal was awarded to troops and officers from Brunswick who participated in the Battles of Quatre Bras and Waterloo.

== Appearance ==
The medal is round and made of bronze from captured French cannons, medals for officers were gilded. The medal is 1 7/20 inches (34 mm) in diameter. The obverse depicts, in a left facing profile, the fallen Duke of Brunswick, Frederick William. Around the edge is the inscription, in German Script, FRIEDRICH WILHELM HERZOG. The reverse of the medal bears the date 1815 in the centre, surrounded by a wreath of oak and laurels. Around the outside of the wreath is the inscription, Braunschweig Seinen Kriegern (Brunswick to her Warriors) above, and Quatrebras und Waterloo below. The medal is suspended from a steel clip and ring attached to a ribbon 1 1/2 inches (38 mm) wide. The ribbon is yellow with blue edge stripes 3/8 inch (9.5 mm) wide.

== Other Waterloo Medals ==
Five nations of Seventh Coalition struck medals for soldiers who took part in the campaign:

1. This medal for the troops of Brunswick
2. Waterloo Medal for British and King's German Legion troops
3. Hanoverian Waterloo Medal
4. Nassau Waterloo Medal
5. Prussian Waterloo Medal
