= Waterloo Medal =

British Army decoration, 1816

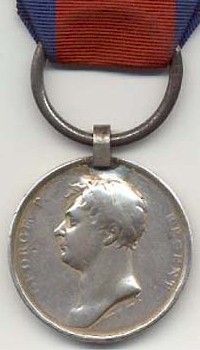
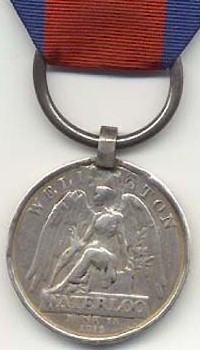
- Obverse and reverse of the medal.
- Type: Campaign medal
- Awarded for: Campaign service
- Description: Silver disk 35 mm wide
- Presented by: United Kingdom of Great Britain and Ireland
- Eligibility: British Army
- Campaigns: Battle of Ligny (16 June 1815); Battle of Quatre Bras (16 June 1815); Waterloo (18 June 1815)
- Clasps: None
- Established: 10 April 1816

Highlights
- Total: Circa 38,500
- Ribbon: crimson with dark blue edges

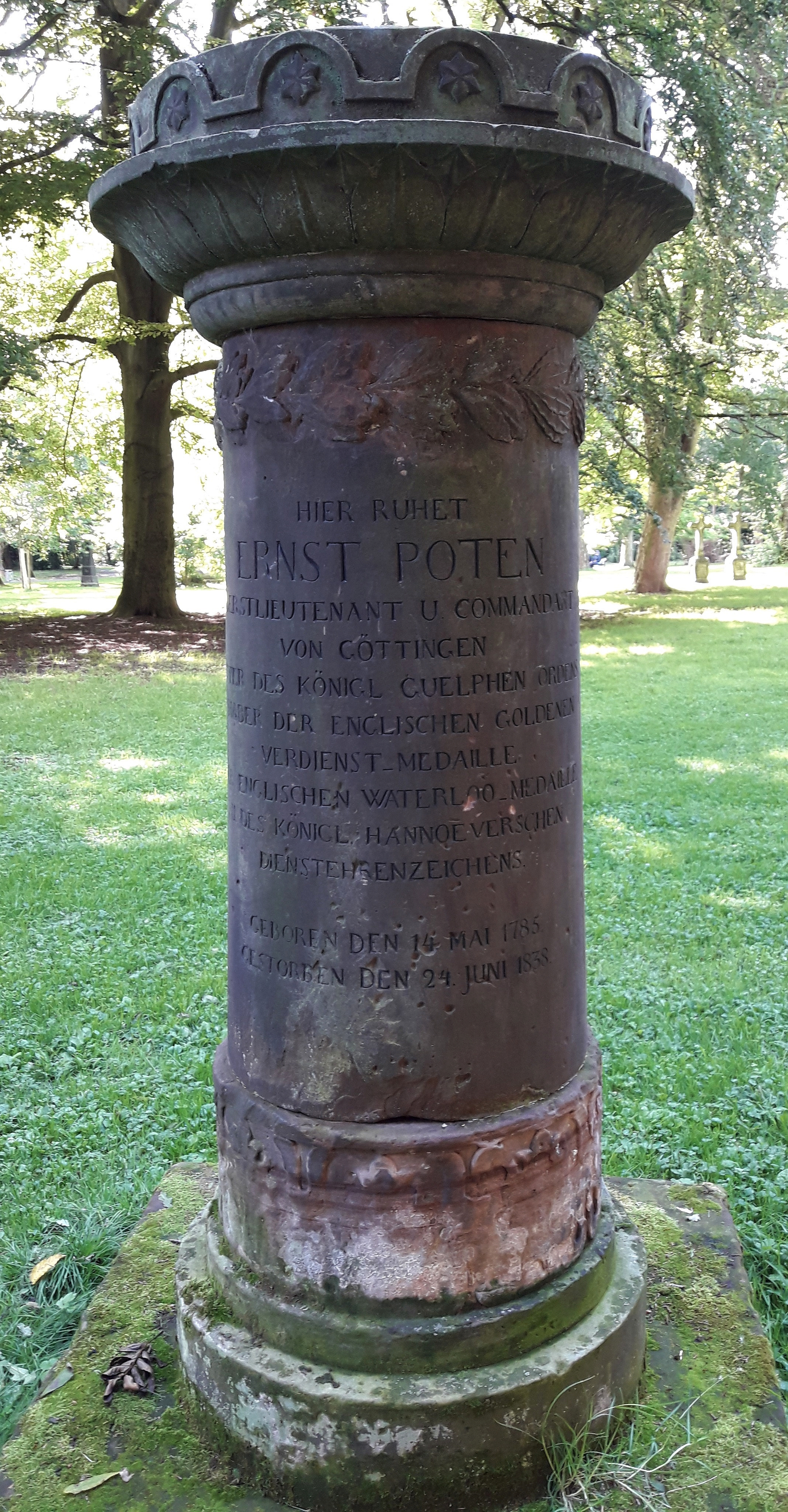
Göttingen, grave of Lieutenant Colonel Ernst Poten (1785–1838) of the Royal Hanoverian Army. The inscription lists the Royal Guelphic Order, Army Gold Medal, British Waterloo Medal and Royal Hanoverian Service Decoration.

The Waterloo Medal is a military decoration that was conferred upon every officer, non-commissioned officer and soldier of the British Army (including members of the King's German Legion) who took part in one or more of the following battles: Ligny (16 June 1815), Quatre Bras (16 June 1815) and Waterloo (18 June 1815). (Note: Those stationed with in reserve under Sir Charles Colville at Hal were also entitled to the medal if they were members of the following regiments, or portions of regiments: 35th Foot, 2nd Battalion; 54th Foot, 1st Battalion; 59th Foot, 2nd Battalion; 91st Foot, 1st Battalion. These regiments were not, however, allowed to assume the word "Waterloo" on their colours, as appears by a War-Office Order, dated 23 December 1815.)

== History ==
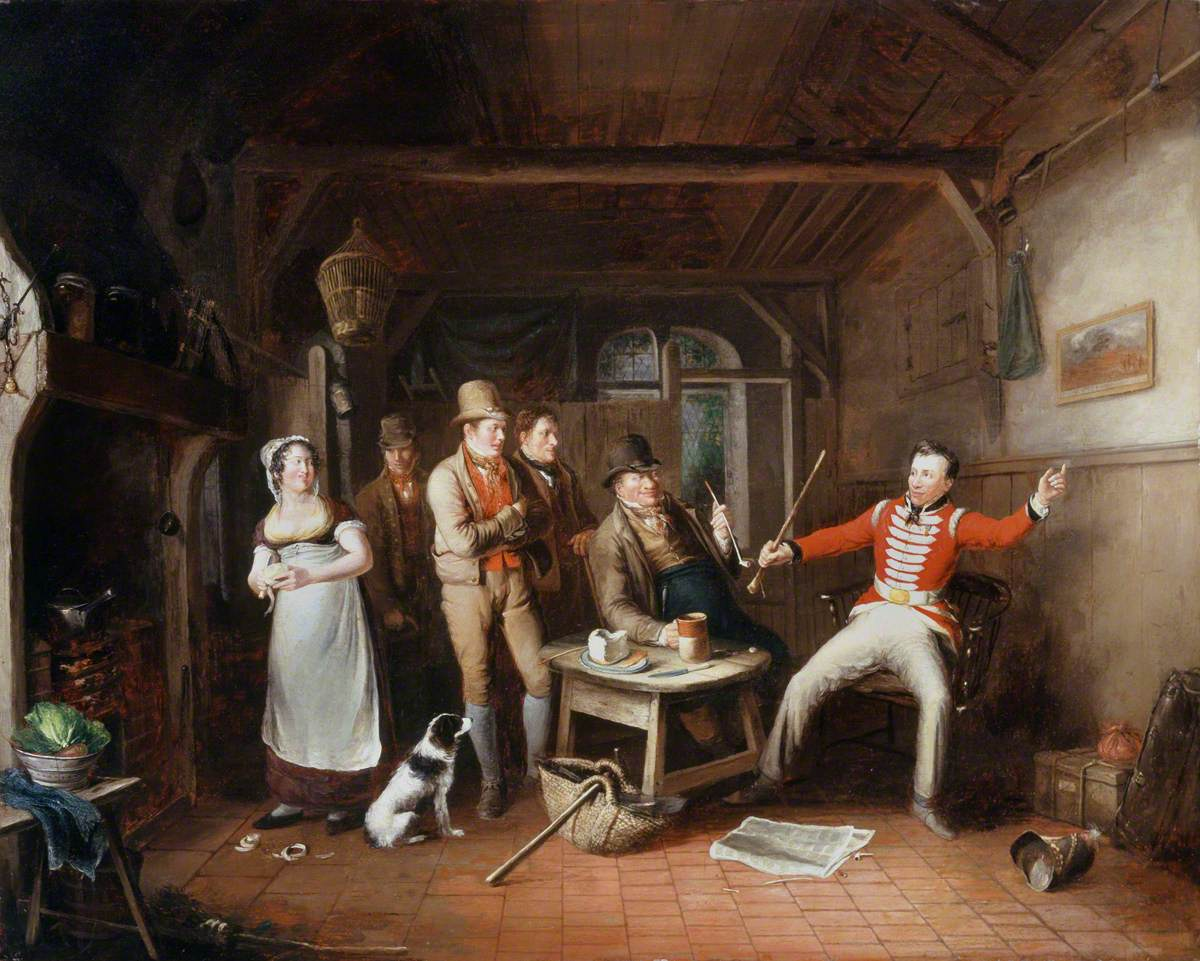
A Soldier Relating His Exploits in a Tavern by John Cawse, 1821. The soldier is shown wearing the Waterloo Medal.

After the victory at Waterloo, the House of Commons voted that a medal be struck for all those who participated in the campaign. The Duke of Wellington was supportive, and on 28 June 1815 he wrote to the Duke of York suggesting:

... the expediency of giving to the non commissioned officers and soldiers engaged in the Battle of Waterloo a medal. I am convinced it would have the best effect in the army, and if the battle should settle our concerns, they will well deserve it.

On 17 September 1815 Duke of Wellington wrote to the Secretary of State for War, stating:

I recommend that we should all have the same medal, hung to the same ribbon as that now used with the [Army Gold] Medal.

The medal was issued in 1816–1817 to every soldier present at one or more of the battles of Ligny, Quatre Bras and Waterloo. Each soldier was also credited with two years extra service and pay, to count for seniority and pension purposes, and were to be known as "Waterloo Men". The medal was announced in the London Gazette on 23 April 1816.

This was the first medal issued by the British Government to all soldiers present during an action. The Military General Service Medal commemorates earlier battles, but was not issued until 1848. The Waterloo Medal was also the first campaign medal awarded to the next-of-kin of men killed in action.

At the time the medal was granted, when such things were not at all the norm, it was very popular with its recipients, though veterans of the Peninsular War may have felt aggrieved that those present only at Waterloo – many of them raw recruits – should receive such a public acknowledgement of their achievements. Meanwhile, those who had undergone the labours and privations of the whole war, had had no recognition of their services beyond the thirteen votes of thanks awarded to them in Parliament. There was no doubt some truth in this discontent on the part of the old soldiers; at the same time British military pride had hitherto rebelled against the practice common in Continental armies, of conferring medals and distinctions on every man, or every regiment, who had simply done their duty in their respective services. The medal was as much a symbol of the importance of the victory as it was of a desire to give general campaign medals to soldiers.

== Number awarded ==
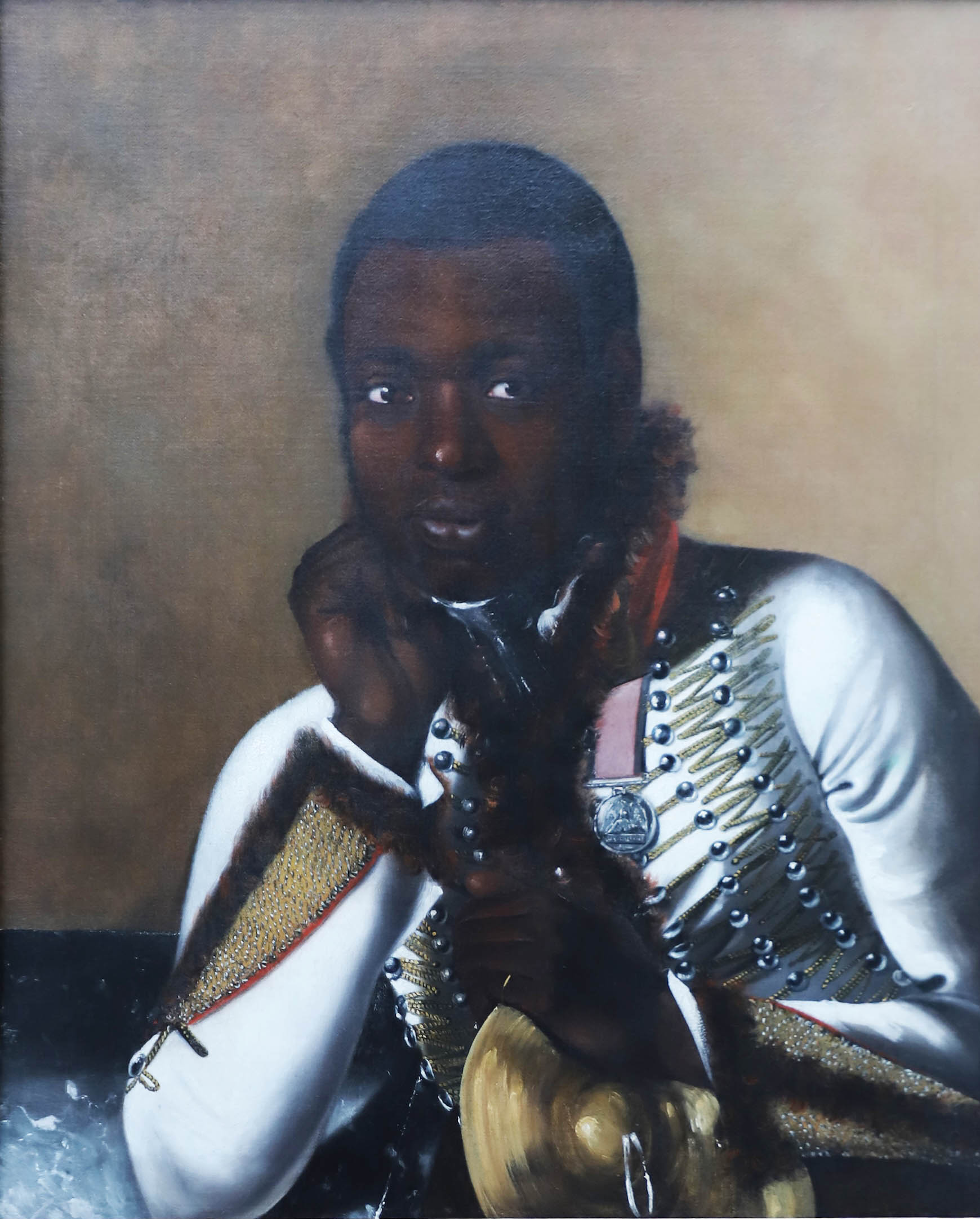
1821 portrait of Thomas James wearing the medal

A total of 39,000 medals were produced, not all of which were awarded. About 6,000 were issued to cavalry; 4,000 to Foot Guards; 16,000 to infantry line regiments; 5,000 to artillery and 6,500 to the King's German Legion. With staff, Sappers and Miners and eight companies of the Royal Waggon Train, approximately 38,500 medals were awarded in total.

Nine of the recipients were black.

== Appearance ==
The medal is made of silver and is 37 mm (1.5 in) in diameter. Thomas Wyon, recently appointed Chief Engraver to the Royal Mint was selected to design the medal. Originally the medals were to be awarded in bronze, but the decision was made at a late stage to produce them in fine silver. (Note: The specification for fine silver is 99.9% pure silver. This is softer, and more susceptible to wear, than sterling silver (92.5% pure silver), used for later campaign medals. See Orders & Medals Research Society Journal, June 2015, page 117.)
The medal's design was as follows:

Obverse: A left facing effigy of the Prince Regent with the inscription "GEORGE P. REGENT".

Reverse: A figure of Victory seated on a plinth with the words "WELLINGTON" above, and "WATERLOO" and the date "JUNE 18 1815" below. The design was modelled on an ancient Greek coin from Elis, now in the British Museum collection.

Suspension: The ribbon passes through a large iron ring on top of the medal, attached to the medal by way of a steel clip. Many recipients replaced this with a more ornate silver suspension.

Ribbon: The 37 mm (1.5 in) wide ribbon is crimson with dark blue edges, each approximately 7 mm (0.28 in) wide. This is the 'military ribbon' also used for the Army Gold Medal and later the Military General Service Medal. There was no provision for a ribbon bar, with the medal itself worn in uniform at all times.

Naming: This was the first medal on which the recipient's rank, name and regiment were inscribed around the edge. The machine for impressing the names was designed and made by two Royal Mint workmen, Thomas Jerome and Charles Harrison. It impressed, somewhat heavily, large serifed capitals into the rim with the space at each end filled by a series of star shaped stamps. Any engraved Waterloo Medal is renamed and any unnamed example has either had the name erased or is a specimen which has been mounted.

The design of the medal, including size, metal and naming, set the pattern for most future British campaign medals.

== Other Waterloo medals ==
Seven nations of the Seventh Coalition struck medals for soldiers who took part in the campaign:

1. This medal for British and King's German Legion troops
2. Brunswick Waterloo Medal
3. Hanoverian Waterloo Medal
4. Nassau Waterloo Medal
5. Netherlands Silver Memorial Cross, 1813–1815 (Zilveren Herdenkingskruis), awarded in 1865
6. Prussian Campaign Medal, 1813–15 (Kriegsdenkmünze)
7. Saxe-Gotha-Altenburg Medal, 1814–15

== See also ==
- St. Helena Medal issued to French veterans
