= Flag officers of the Kriegsmarine =

List of Flag Officers

Flag officers of the Kriegsmarine were the leadership of the German Navy (known then as the "Kriegsmarine") from 1935 to 1945. Most flag officers had also served as officers of the Reichsmarine, as well as the Imperial German Navy during World War I. German naval flag officers were divided into five Admiralty ranks while a senior captain rank, known as Kommodore also existed. The Kriegsmarine flag officers were responsible for holding the senior most naval positions within the organization of the Kriegsmarine.

== Grand admirals ==
Rank	Name	Born	Naval service	Major positions	Post war fate	Died
Großadmiral	Karl Dönitz	16 Sep 1891 (Grünau)	1910 - 1945 (35 years)	* Supreme Commander of the German Armed Forces (1945) (Note: As President of Germany) * Commander-in-Chief of the German Navy (1943-1945) * Commander of Submarines (1939-1943) * Leader of Submarines (1936-1939)	Sentenced to ten years imprisonment by the Nuremberg trials. Released in October 1956.	24 Dec 1980 (Aumühle); Aged 89
Großadmiral	Erich Raeder	24 Apr 1876 (Wandsbek)	1894 - 1943 (49 years)	* Commander-in-Chief of the German Navy (1935-1943) (Note: Previously had served as Commander-in-Chief of the Reichsmarine from 1928 to 1935)	Sentenced to life imprisonment at the Nuremberg trials. Released 1955 and died five years later	6 Nov 1960 (Kiel); Aged 84

== General admirals ==
General admirals of the Kriegsmarine

Rank	Name	Born	Naval service	Major positions	Post war fate	Died
Generaladmiral	Conrad Albrecht	7 Oct 1880 (Bremen)	1899 - 1939 (40 years)	* Commander, Navy Group East (1938-1939) * Baltic Sea Regional Commander (1935-1938)	Retired shortly after the beginning of World War II; Was not investigated by the allied occupation forces after the war.	18 Aug 1969 (Hamburg); Aged 88
Generaladmiral	Hermann Boehm	18 Jan 1884 (Rybnik)	1903 - 1945 (42 years)	* Inspector of Naval education (1944-1945) * Commander, Norwegian Naval Area (1940-1943) * Fleet commander of the German Navy (1938-1939) * Commander, Naval Region North Sea (1937-1938) * Commander German naval forces, Spanish Civil War (1936-1937) * Commander of Surface Craft (1935-1937) (Note: Also held this position in the Reichsmarine with date of appointment from 25 September 1934)	Testified in defense of Erich Raeder at the Nuremberg trials	11 Apr 1972 (Kiel); Aged 88
Generaladmiral	Rolf Carls	29 May 1885 (Rostock)	1903 - 1943 (40 years)	* Commander, Navy Group North (1940-1943) * Commander Navy Group East (1939-1940) * Commander, Naval Region Baltic Sea (1938-1939) * Fleet commander of the German Navy (1936-1938) * Commander German naval forces, Spanish Civil War (1936-1937) * Commander of Liners (1935-1936) (Note: Also held this position in the Reichsmarine with date of appointment from 29 September 1934)	Contender for the position of Navy Commander-in-Chief. After the post went to Karl Dönitz, retired from the Navy in May 1943. Killed in an allied air raid in 1945	24 Apr 1945 (Bad Oldesloe); Aged 59
Generaladmiral	Hans-Georg von Friedeburg	15 Jul 1895 (Strasbourg)	1914 - 1945 (31 years)	* Commander-in-Chief of the German Navy (1945) * Commander of Submarines (1943-1945) * Deputy commander of submarines (1941-1943)	Surrendered German forces to the western allies in May 1945. Afterwards committed suicide.	23 May 1945 (Flensburg); Aged 49
Generaladmiral	Oskar Kummetz	21 Jul 1891 (Illowo)	1910 - 1945 (35 years)	* Baltic Sea Regional Commander (1944-1945) * Commander of Surface Forces (1944) * Commander of Cruisers (1942-1943) * Inspector of Torpedoes (1939-1942) * Staff officer, Navy Fleet & Baltic Sea commands (1937-1939) * Leader of Torpedo-boats (1935-1937)	Held as a prisoner of war until November 30, 1946	17 Dec 1980 (Neustadt); Aged 89
Generaladmiral	Wilhelm Marschall	30 Sep 1886 (Augsburg)	1906 - 1945 (39 years)	* Commander, Navy Group West (1943) * Commanding Admiral of France (1942) * Commander, Navy Group South (1941-1942) * Inspector of Naval education (1940-1941) * Fleet commander of the German Navy (1939-1940) * Commander of Battleships (1938-1939) * Commander German naval forces, Spanish Civil War (1937-1938)	Placed on the inactive officer list in 1943; Recalled twice for special duty (1944-1945); Held as a prisoner of war (1945-1947)	20 Mar 1976 (Mölln); Aged 89
Generaladmiral	Alfred Saalwächter	10 Jan 1883 (Neusalz)	1901 - 1942 (41 years)	* Commander, Navy Group West (1939-1942) * Commander, Naval Region North Sea (1938-1939)	Captured by the Red Army in June 1945; Executed by firing squad after a show trial Exonerated in the late 1990s by a Russian court	6 Dec 1945 (Moscow); Aged 62
Generaladmiral	Otto Schniewind	14 Dec 1887 (Saarlouis)	1907 - 1944 (37 years)	* Commander, Navy Group North (1943-1944) * Fleet commander of the German Navy (1941-1944) * Chief of Staff, Navy War Office (1938-1941)	Placed on inactive list in July 1944; Acquitted of war crimes at the High Command Trial; Served on Naval Historical Team (1949-1952)	26 Mar 1964 (Linz am Rhein); Aged 76
Generaladmiral	Otto Schultze	11 May 1884 (Oldenburg)	1900 - 1937; 1939 - 1942 (40 years)	* Commanding Admiral of France (1941-1942) * Commander Naval Region North Sea (1939) * Commander, Naval Station North Sea (1935-1937)	Retired from the Kriegsmarine in 1937; Recalled for three months in 1939 and then again in 1941; Final retirement on 31 August 1942	22 Jan 1966 (Hamburg); Aged 81
Generaladmiral	Walter Warzecha	23 May 1891 (Schwiebus)	1909 - 1945 (36 years)	* Commander-in-Chief of the Germany Navy (1945) * Chief of the Navy War Office (1944-1945) * Chief of the Navy General Headquarters (1939-1944)	Served as Commander-in-Chief of the Navy for one month (May - June 1945); Released as a prisoner-of-war in 1947	3 Aug 1956 (Hamburg); Aged 65
Generaladmiral	Karl Witzell	18 Oct 1884 (Hiersfeld)	1902 - 1942 (40 years)	* Chief of Naval Armaments (1939-1942)	Retired from active service in 1942; Soviet prisoner-of-war for ten years, released in 1955	31 May 1976 (Berlin); Aged 91

== Admirals ==
Admirals of the Kriegsmarine

Rank	Name	Born	Naval service	Major positions	Post war fate	Died
Admiral	Wilhelm Canaris	1 Jan 1887 (Aplerbeck)	1905 - 1944 (39 years)	* Chief of Military Intelligence (1935-1944)	Implicated in the 20 July Plot and imprisoned by the Gestapo executed by the SS in 1945	9 Apr 1945 (Flossenbürg); Aged 58
Admiral	Otto Ciliax	30 Oct 1891 (Neudietendorf)	1910 - 1945 (35 years)	* Commander, Naval Forces Norway (1943-1945) * Commander of Battleships (1941-1943) * Chief of Staff, Navy Group West (1939-1941) * Commanding Officer, Scharnhorst (1939)	Father of Flottillenadmiral Otto Hermann Ciliax	12 Dec 1964 (Travemünde); Aged 73
Admiral	Günther Lütjens	25 May 1889 (Wiesbaden)	1907 - 1941 (34 years)	* Fleet commander of the German Navy (1940-1941) (Note: While serving as fleet commander, embarked onboard the battleship Bismarck in order to serve as the operational flag officer while Captain Ernst Lindemann served as the ship's commander. Lütjens was subsequently killed during the battle of the Denmark Strait, making him the only Kriegsmarine fleet commander to die in active combat against an enemy) * Battleship force commander, Operation Weserübung (1940) * Commander of Surface Craft (1939-1940) * Leader of Torpedo Boats (1937-1939)	Killed in action on board the battleship Bismarck in 1941.	27 May 1941 (Atlantic Ocean); Aged 52

== Vice admirals ==
Vice admirals of the Kriegsmarine

Rank	Name	Born	Naval service	Major positions	Post war fate	Died
Vizeadmiral	Lothar von Arnauld de la Perière	18 Mar 1886 (Posen)	1903 - 1932; 1939 - 1941 (31 years)	* Naval Commander of the Netherlands (1940-1941)	Transferred to command Navy Group South; Killed en route in a plane crash	24 Feb 1941 (Le Bourget); Aged 54
Vizeadmiral	Hellmuth Heye	9 Aug 1895 (Beckingen)	1914 - 1945 (31 years)	* Chief of Naval Special Operations (1944-1945)	Released after one year of captivity as a prisoner-of-war Elected to the Bundestag of West Germany (1953-1961)	10 Nov 1970 (Mittelheim); Aged 75
Vizeadmiral	Wilhelm Meendsen-Bohlken	25 Jun 1897 (Brake)	1915 - 1945 (30 years)	* Fleet commander of the German Navy (1944-1945) * Commander, Italian Naval Region (1943-1944)	Arrested at the war's end as a member of the Navy High Command; Later released without charge	20 Aug 1985 (Cologne); Aged 88
Vizeadmiral	Leopold Siemens	17 May 1889 (Berlin)	1910 - 1945 (35 years)	* Staff Officer, Naval Region Baltic Sea (1944-1945) * Commander, Norwegian coastal region (1943-1944) * Deputy fleet commander, German Navy (1940-1941)	Placed on inactive duty January 1945 with no further assignments before the end of World War II	7 Dec 1979 (Cologne); Aged 90

== Rear admirals ==
Rear admirals of the Kriegsmarine

Rank	Name	Born	Naval service	Major positions	Post war fate	Died
Konteradmiral	Erich Bey	23 Mar 1898 (Hamburg)	1916 - 1943 (27 years)	* Commander of Cruisers (1943) * Commander of Destroyers (1940-1943)	Led a battleship-destroyer task force to attack a British convoy on Christmas Day 1943. Killed in the subsequent engagement with the Royal Navy	26 Dec 1943 (North Cape, Norway); Aged 45
Konteradmiral	Kurt Böhmer	31 Dec 1892 (Magdeburg)	1914 - 1944 (30 years)	* Commander, 9th Naval Security Division (1942-1944) * Leader of Minesweepers "North" (1941-1942) * Leader of Special Craft "West" (1940-1941)	Killed by Latvian partisans while hunting	1 Oct 1944 (Ventspils); Aged 51
Konteradmiral	Robert Eyssen	2 Apr 1892 (Frankfurt)	1912 - 1945 (33 years)	* Chief of Vienna Military District III (1944-1945)		31 Mar 1960 (Baden-Baden); Aged 67
Konteradmiral	Werner Fürbringer	2 Oct 1888 (Braunschweig)	1907 - 1920; 1927 - 1943 (29 years)	* Tactical officer, Office of Submarines (1939-1945)	Obtained flag rank towards the end of World War II.	8 Feb 1982 (Braunschweig); Aged 93
Konteradmiral	Eberhard Godt	15 Aug 1900 (Lübeck)	1918 - 1945 (27 years)	* Chief of Operations of Submarines (1939-1945)	Advisor to the Naval Historical Team regarding U-boat operations during World War II	13 Sep 1995 (Lübeck); Aged 95
Konteradmiral	Karl-Jesko von Puttkamer	24 Mar 1900 (Frankfurt)	1917 - 1945 (28 years)	* Naval adjutant to Adolf Hitler (1943-1945) (Note: Present during the 20 July plot, award the Wound Badge of 20 July 1944)	Held as a prisoner of war from 1945 to 1947	4 Mar 1981 (Munich); Aged 80
Konteradmiral	Gerhard Wagner	23 Nov 1898 (Schwerin)	1916 - 1945 (29 years)	* Operations officer, Naval war command (1942-1945)	Accompanied Admiral von Friedeburg for the surrender of German forces to Bernard Montgomery. Later served as a rear admiral in the West German Navy	26 Jun 1987 (Altenkirchen); Aged 88

== See also ==
- List of German admirals
