= Naval regions and districts of the Kriegsmarine =

Naval regions and districts were the official shore establishment of Nazi Germany's Kriegsmarine during World War II. The Kriegsmarine shore establishment was divided into four senior regional commands, who were in turn subordinated to the operational Navy Group commanders who commanded all sea and shore naval forces within a particular geographical region. Within each naval region were several subordinate naval districts who were responsible for all navy shore activities within their area of responsibility, most significantly were the various German ports of occupied Europe.

== Naval regions ==
The naval regions (Marineoberkommando) were the senior most shore command in a given geographical area and were subordinate to the Navy Group commanders. A total of four naval regions were eventually established in occupied Europe during the Second World War. A deputy commander, known as the "2. Admiral" commanded staff units and oversaw regional administrative matters. Specifically, the deputy region commander oversaw the Schiffs–Stamm-Abteilung (Ship's Administration Department) which was a liaison for port commands and also served as the ultimate authority for personnel in transit or stationed in shore naval garrisons. For those permanent assigned to the ship's department, a subordinate Schiffs–Stamm-Regiment existed as an intermediary command.

Other major subordinates to the regional command were the Befehlshaber der Sicherung (Commander of Security), Inspektion des Schiffsmaschinewesens (Naval engineering inspector), Artilleriearsenalinspektionen (Inspector of arsenals and artillery), and the Sanitätsamt der Marinestation (Medical department). A regional signals detachment (Marine–Nachrichten–Abteilung) also existed to coordinate orders and messages between the various subordinate commands.

All naval regions were permanently assigned at least one navy shore combat unit. In most cases this was known as the Marine–Schützen–Bataillon; a larger formation known as a Marine–Bordflak–Brigade also existed. Engineering and pioneer naval units were typically grouped into a Marine–Festungspionier–Bataillon. Regional commands were also responsible for the operation of all naval prisons. Naval prisoner-of-war camps were under the jurisdiction of a senior officer known as the Kommandantur des Marine–Kriegsgefangenen– und Interniertenlagers.

All naval regions further maintained a legal office as well as a war correspondence company (Marinekriegsberichterkompanie). All induction and recruiting centers operated through an office known as the Marine–Abrechnungs– und Vorprüfungsamt while the Dienststelle für Eignungsprüfung administrated certification examinations for the various naval rates. Each naval region also maintained a billeting and housing office, known as the Abwicklungsamt.

=== Naval Region North Sea ===
The North Sea naval region was the first to be established and was originally known as Der Kommandierende Admiral der Marinestation der Nordsee. The command was formed from an existing unit of the Reichsmarine, known as the Marinestation der Nordsee. In the spring of 1943, the title was renamed as the Marineoberkommando der Nordsee. Major subordinate districts were the Deutsches Marinekommando Italien (this command eventually became Naval Region South) and the Admiral in den Niederlanden which oversaw all German naval matters in the occupied Netherlands.

The following officers held the title of regional commander during the years of Naval region North Sea's existence.

- Admiral Otto Schultze July 1935 – October 1937
- Admiral Hermann Boehm October 1937 – October 1938
- Admiral Alfred Saalwächter October 1938 – August 1939
- Admiral Otto Schultze August – November 1939
- Vice admiral Hermann Densch November 1939 – March 1943
- Admiral Erich Förste March 1943 – May 1945

Major port cities under the control of Naval Region North Sea were Wilhelmshaven, Hamburg, and Bremen. The regional command was also the authority for all naval observatories in the area. A central administrative office, known as the Heimatverwaltung West coordinated all shore activities while the Heimatverwaltung Ausland oversaw region personnel deployed to other areas of the Kriegsmarine. The Troßschiffverband Nord was the department responsible for the maintenance and upkeep of all troop ships on call for deployment into the North Sea.

=== Naval Region Baltic Sea ===
Germany had maintained a naval presence in the Baltic Sea since the 19th century, and in 1865 the earliest continuous command in the area, the Marinestation der Ostsee, was established in Kiel. By June 1935, the Reichsmarine had established a position known as Der Chef der Marinestation der Ostsee. In November 1938, the Kriegsmarine created the post of Der Kommandierende General der Marinestation der Ostsee, also headquartered at Kiel. The region was commanded by a full admiral (or general admiral) with a deputy known as the 2. Admiral der Ostseestation.

Subordinated to the Baltic Sea regional commander were three "coastal commanders" (Küstenbefehlshaber) who oversaw various harbor and coastal defense units. The port superintendent of Kiel (Marineintendantur Kiel) also reported directly to the regional command as well as several inspection units for naval weapons, artillery, torpedoes, and well as an Inspector for Training and Education (Inspektion des Bildungswesens der Marine). The naval region also contained a signals unit, medical department, and personnel branch. The commander of U-boats was originally administratively subordinated to the Baltic regional commander, but became an independent separate command after 1938.

In mid 1942, the name of the command was shortened to Kommando der Marinestation der Ostsee and in 1943 adopted its final name as Marineoberkommando Ostsee. The two primary subordinate naval districts were the Admiral Dänemark (controlling all shore based German naval forces in Denmark) and the Admiral Ostland which controlled naval shore forces east of Kiel, including those stationed in Poland.

The following Kriegsmarine officers held the position as Baltic Sea regional commander:

- Admiral Conrad Albrecht: Jul 1935 - Nov 1938
- Admiral Rolf Carls: Nov 1938 - Jan 1940
- Admiral Günther Guse: Jan 1940 - Mar 1943
- Admiral Hubert Schmundt: Mar 1943 - Mar 1944
- General admiral Oskar Kummetz: Mar 1944 - May 1945

=== Naval Region South ===
Shore activities in the Mediterranean Sea were originally overseen by an office, known as the Chef des Deutschen Marineverbindungsstabes, headed by Rear Admiral Eberhard Weichold and established in June 1940. The following year, the office adopted the lengthy title Deutscher Admiral beim Admiralstab der königlich italienischen Marine. In November 1941, the office was re-designated as the Befehlshaber des Deutschen Marinekommandos Italien. In March 1943, the command was assumed by Rear Admiral Wilhelm Meendsen-Bohlken. Meedsen-Bohlken was briefly replaced by Vice Admiral Friedrich Ruge, in May 1943, before Meedsen-Bohlken returned to the same post that August. In July 1944, command was assumed by Vice Admiral Werner Löwisch. In January 1945 the Italian naval shore command was renamed as the Oberbefehlshaber Marineoberkommando Süd.

=== Naval Region Norway ===
The final Navy regional command established during the Second World War was the Marineoberkommando in Norwegen, established in late 1943 to deal specifically with German naval forces in Norway. Admiral Otto Ciliax served as regional commander until the last month of the war when he was replaced by Admiral Theodor Krancke.

The headquarters of the Norwegian naval region was at Oslo where was maintained a headquarters staff, signals company, and war correspondence unit. A naval weapons office, known as the Torpedoarsenal Norwegen oversaw all logistics for naval arms, in particular submarine torpedoes, for Kriegsmarine units stationed in Norway. The region also operationally controlled a submarine netting group known as Netzsperrgruppe Nord. In addition to regular naval shore commands, the Norwegian Naval Region also hosted four naval construction brigades (Bauaufsicht der Kriegsmarine) which were stationed in Horten, Bergen, Trondheim, and Tromsø

== Naval districts ==
Naval districts were the direct operational forces for all shore units of the Kriegsmarine and were assigned coastal areas of responsibility as well as operational command of any permanently assigned submarine or ship flotillas (although administratively, these units were under the various type commanders). Most naval regions also maintained a staff headquarters unit, signals unit, war correspondence company, as well as a regional medical clinic.

Navy districts were operationally subordinated to Navy group commanders and were organized by either geographical region or country of occupation. The "Admiral Deutsche Bucht" was headquartered in Wilhelmshaven and commanded German ports along the North Sea. The "Admiral z.b.V. Südost" was in command of inland waterways, river units, and was headquartered at Traunstein.

=== France and the Low Countries ===
After the occupation of France and the Low Countries, the Kriegsmarine established a single regional command for these areas which was known as "Admiral West". The command was first stood up in May 1940, while the Battle of France was still ongoing, with its first commander Admiral Karlgeorg Schuster. In June 1940, following the surrender of France, the command's name changed to Kommandierender Admiral Frankreich and was headquartered in Paris. In May 1941, command as "Admiral Frankreich" was passed to Otto Schultze. In August 1942, the final commander, Wilhelm Marschall was appointed and would hold the command until that November. At that time the naval region of France was broken up into smaller areas as a result of Case Anton when Germany occupied the entirety of France.

The three late war naval districts of France were:

- Admiral Atlantikküste (Western France)
- Admiral Kanalküste (English Channel)
- Admiral französischen Südküste (Southern France)

Friedrich Rieve commanded the English channel district during the Invasion of Normandy while Ernst Scheurlen commanded southern France during Operation Dragoon. In both these cases, the commands were disbanded shortly thereafter due to an overrun of the districts by Allied forces. The "Atlantic Coast" command, overseeing the majority of naval forces in western France, remained active until early 1945 under its final commander, Admiral Johannes Bachmann.

A special naval area was also established for the city of Paris and was known as the Höheres Kommando der Marinedienststellen in Groß-Paris (Supreme Command for Naval Services in the Greater Paris Area). The command contained a headquarters staff, several transport units, a signals and communications division, legal office, and medical staff. Werner Lindenau served as naval commander of Paris from June 1943 until the Germans evacuated the city the following year.

German port facilities in occupied Belgium were never formed into an independent command and were subordinated to other regions and naval districts. Naval shore authority in the Netherlands was originally a subordinate officer to Admiral West and was known as the Marinebefehlshaber in den Niederlanden. The original commander was Lothar von Arnauld de la Perière who briefly held the post for a one month in May 1940 before command was assumed by Helmuth Kienast. In June 1943, the post was past to Vizeadmiral Kurt Caesar Hoffmann who was in turn relieved by Gustav Kleikamp in March 1943. the following month, the Netherlands district became an independent command known as the Kommandierender Admiral in den Niederlanden. The final command of the district was Vice Admiral Rudolf Stange, who held command in January 1945 until the Germans evacuated the country in the face of advancing Allied forces.

=== Denmark and Norway ===
When German occupied Denmark in April 1940, the Kriegsmarine established a naval command for the entire country known as the Marinebefehlshaber Dänemark. The command was first held by Admiral Raul Mewis and maintained two subordinate naval districts known as the Abschnitt Nordjütland and the Abschnitt Südjütland und dänische Inseln. In March 1943 the name of the command was changed to the Kommandierender Admiral Dänemark, frequently shortened to simply "Admiral Dänemark". The command was then assumed by Vice Admiral Hans-Heinrich Wurmbach, who held the post until the end of World War II. In April 1944, after Germany had placed all of Denmark under military occupation the previous fall, the command name was again changed to Kommandierender Admiral Skagerak.

The German occupation of Norway, with its direct access to the North Sea, required the Kriegsmarine to form a major naval command to deal with the vastness of the Norwegian coastline, along with its many ports and harbors. The original Norwegian naval command was known as the Kommandierender Admiral Norwegen and the post was held by Hermann Böhm between 1940 and 1943. By the end of 1940, the Norwegian naval area had been elevated to the status of a naval region (the region name would formally change in February 1943), with the following subordinate Norwegian naval regions established.

- Admiral norwegische Nordküste (Northern Norway)
- Admiral norwegische Westküste (Central Norway)
- Admiral norwegische Südküste (Southern Norway)
- Admiral norwegische Polarküste (Polar Norway)

The Norwegian naval region and areas would continue in full operation until the end of World War II and consisted of the largest number of Kriegsmarine forces which remained intact upon Germany's surrender in May 1945.

=== Baltic Sea Naval District ===
The Baltic Sea naval area was first formed in November 1941, headquartered at Danzig, and responsible for German port and harbors east of the main naval region out of Kiel. The geographical area of the command was relatively small and the posted commander never held a higher rank than Kapitän zur See. After Germany invaded the Soviet Union, and occupied the Baltic states, the command's responsibility increased and eventually held authority over several naval shore facilities, including medical units, arsenals, and communication commands in Libau, Reval, and Riga.

Two of the more unique units assigned to the Baltic area were a Pathologische Abteilung, consisting of naval medical personnel conducting pathology research, as well as an island station at Tütters. The area command also oversaw several coastal monitoring stations (Küstenüberwachungsstellen) which were incorporated into the Kriegsmarine system of sea defense zones.

In 1944, as the Baltic countries came under danger of liberation by Soviet forces, the Baltic Sea area was divided into two geographical regions (east and west) with Vice Admiral Werner Lange assuming command in the west (as Admiral Westliche Ostsee) while Theodor Burchardi assumed command as Admiral östliche Ostsee in the east. Following liberation by Soviet forces, the naval commands in Riga were accused of war crimes for utilizing Slavic and Jewish slave labor for hard labor on German controlled docks.

=== North and Black Seas ===
The Kriegsmarine maintained four smaller naval commands to deal with various shore facilities not covered under another major naval area. The largest was the "Admiral Nordmeer", formed in October 1941 as a direct subordinate to the Naval regional commander for the North Sea. Hubert Schmundt served as the North Sea area commander until 1942 when he was replaced by August Thiele. Otto Klüber then held the post until command was assumed by a deputy in 1944.

An independent naval region was the "Admiral Schwarzes Meer", responsible for shore operations in the Black Sea. The command had originally been established as a navy expeditionary group before being renamed as the Deutsche Marinemission Rumänien in 1942. The name of the command was changed the following year to "Admiral Schwarzes Meer" before adopting its final name as the Kommandierender Admiral Schwarzes Meer in 1944. Several officers held this posting until Germany finally withdrew from the area in the face of Red Army advance.

Black Sea area commanders

- Vizeadmiral Friedrich-Wilhelm Fleischer: Feb 1941 – Apr 1942
- Vizeadmiral Hans-Heinrich Wurmbach: May 1942 – Aug 1942
- Konteradmiral Hellmuth Heye (acting commander): Sep 1942 – Oct 1942
- Vizeadmiral Robert Witthoeft-Emden: Nov 1942 – Jan 1943
- Vizeadmiral Gustav Kieseritzky: Feb 1943 – Oct 1943
- Vizeadmiral Helmuth Brinkmann: Nov 1943 – Oct 1944

The Black Sea area command held the same authority as a naval region and possessed a headquarters staff at Konstanza with an attached signals unit and naval pioneer battalion. The area command also held operational control over the deployment of two assigned submarine chaser flotillas as well as a flotilla of auxiliary minesweepers and patrol-sentry boats. The 30th U-boat Flotilla was also deployed to the area, however operational control was held by the Befehlshaber der U-Boote. Later in the war, the Black sea area gained a submarine netting unit known as Netzsperrgruppe Schwarzes Meer.

In addition to standard ports and harbors, the Black Sea area maintained a number of commands for smaller inlet naval stations, known as Seetransportstelle. Around the Black Sea area were also interspersed naval directorate stations (Marine-Intendanturdienststelle) which coordinated all activities across the geographical region.

=== Aegean and Adriatic Seas ===
Following the German conquest of Yugoslavia and the invasion of Greece, the Kriegsmarine set up two naval commands for regional operations in the Aegean and Adriatic Seas. The Aegean naval command was first established in February 1941, under Rear Admiral Hans-Hubertus von Stosch. Command was then assumed in the fall of that year by Erich Förste, who held it until February 1943, when command was past to Werner Lange.

The Aegean naval command consisted of a headquarters staff as well as an attached signals unit and pioneer battalion. A naval garrison (Wachkompanie) was stationed at Salamis while the shipyards in Athens also fell under the regional command. The region further maintained a transportation company, two war correspondence companies, and was the administrative senior authority for the third destroyer flotilla and the 23rd U-boat Flotilla. Later in the war, the region added a legal office, quartermaster command, as well as a submarine netting squadron (Netzsperrgruppe Süd). The region was also the reporting senior for two German hospital ships.

The Adriatic naval region ("Admiral Adria") was established in September 1943 under Vizeadmiral Joachim Lietzmann. The command originally consisted of a headquarters staff in Trieste accompanied by a communications unit and pioneer command. By 1944, smaller offices of the region, dealing with logistics, operations, torpedo armament, and naval artillery placements, had been established in Pula, Dubrovnik (Ragusa), Spalato, and Durrës. In July 1944, command was assumed by Vice Admiral Werner Löwisch.

== Naval areas ==
In larger Naval regions, an intermediary command between the regions and local forces was the "Navy Area" (Marine–Abschnitt) of which the Kriegsmarine established seventeen such areas during the Second World War. In occupied territories, as well as some major German ports, these areas were known as Kriegsmarinedienststellen (Navy War Service Areas) with fourteen established between 1941 and 1945. Navy areas were typically commanded by a senior naval officer, most often a Kapitän zur See or Korvettenkapitän, who was known as Der Kommandant im Abschnitt..

=== Navy Area Headquarters ===
- Borkum
- Brunsbüttel
- Cuxhaven
- Emden
- Friedrichstadt
- Gotenhafen
- Helgoland
- Memel
- Norderney
- Pillau
- Rügen
- Stralsund
- Swinemünde
- Sylt
- Wangerooge
- Wesermünde
- Wilhelmshaven

=== Navy War Service Areas ===
- Aalborg
- Bordeaux
- Boulogne
- Bremen
- Danzig
- Dünkirchen
- Hamburg
- Königsberg
- Kopenhagen
- Le Havre
- Marseille
- Oslo
- Ostende
- Stettin

== Sea defense zones ==
Sea defense zones were tactical naval areas, along the coastline of occupied Europe, intended to provide an operational command chain in the event of an actual enemy attack. The zones were commanded by an officer normally ranked as either Kapitän zur See or Konteradmiral. The sea defense zone commander (Kommandant der Seeverteidigung) answered to the Navy regional commanders and would take tactical control over all shore forces in a given area should an enemy launch an actual attack against a segment of German coastline.

In practice, the sea defense zones became well tested when the Allies invaded western Europe, in particular at the battle of Normandy. Sea Defense zone forces also fought fiercely to avoid losing Germany's submarine bases in France, in one case holding out for several months under Allied siege before surrendering.
