= Type commander (Kriegsmarine) =

German naval administrative officer

A type commander in the Kriegsmarine was a permanently assigned administrative officer in the organization of the Kriegsmarine which oversaw the development, deployment, and in some cases operational activities of the various classes of German naval vessels. Due to cross jurisdiction with the Navy group commanders, who tactically commanded all vessels at sea, some type commanders were little more than ceremonial officers who held a title with little authority. Others, such as Karl Dönitz who commanded the German U-boat force, exercised near total independence and held enormous authority, both operationally and administrative.

The type commands of minesweepers and patrol boats were under direct control of the Harbor Security Command (Sicherungsstreitkräfte) and thus were not considered as regular type commanders in comparison to other classes of vessels.

== Battleships and Cruisers ==
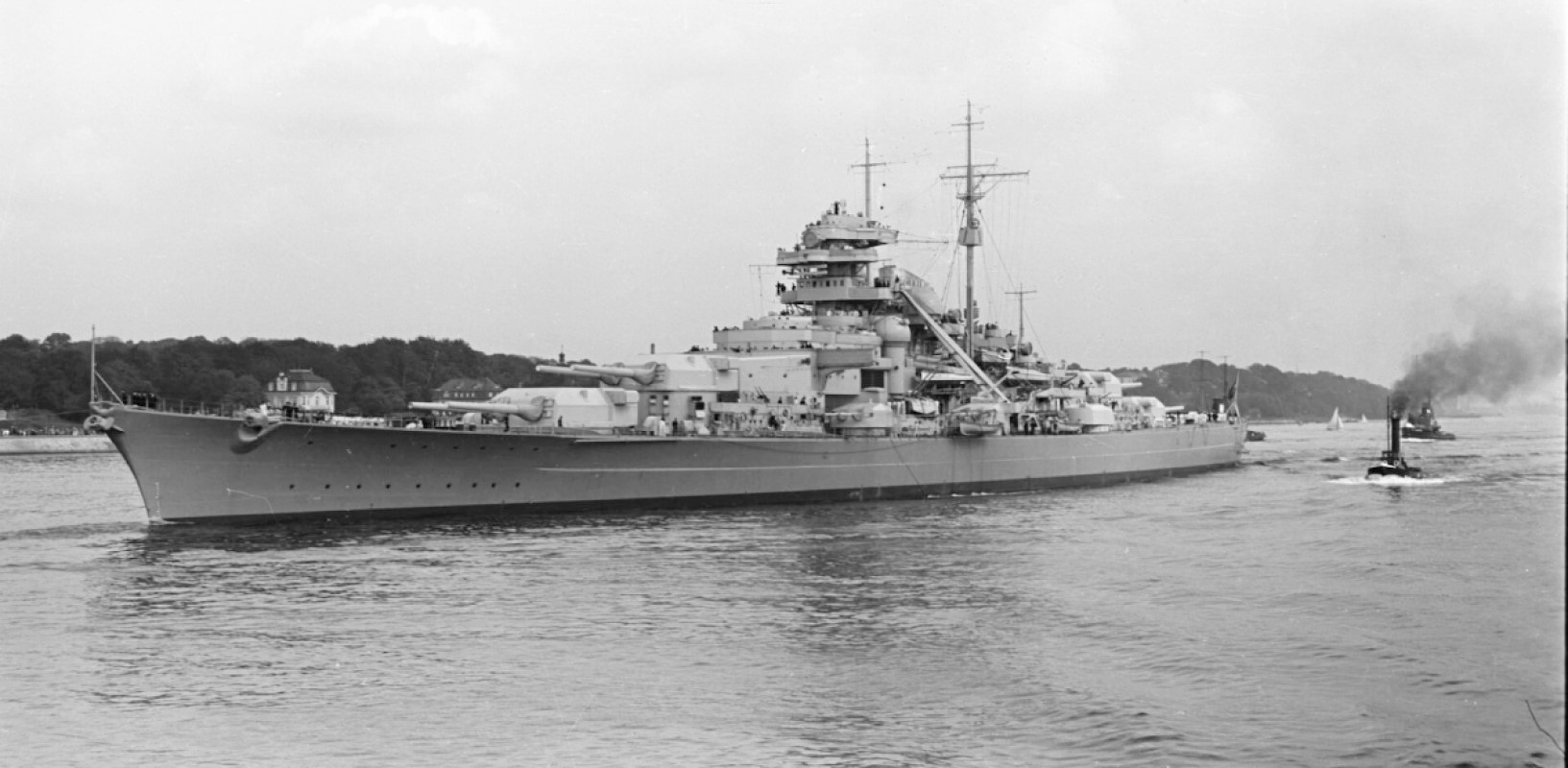
German battleships were originally under their own type command until merger with the cruiser command

The battleship and cruiser type commands were originally separate offices, beginning with an office inherited from the Reichsmarine known as the Befehlshaber der Linienschiffe (Commander of Liners). In November 1936, the command was renamed as Befehlshaber der Panzerschiffe. Rolf Carls was the first commander under the new title until 1938 when the post was assigned to Vizeadmiral Wilhelm Marschall. The following year, Marschall was named as the new Kriegsmarine fleet commander, and no successor was appointed to lead the battleship branch. The post remained vacant until June 1941 when it was merged with the cruiser type command to form the Befehlshaber der Schlachtschiffe (B.d.S) (Commander of Battleships).

Otto Ciliax served as commander of battleships until May 1942 when the command was abolished completely and thereafter battleship type affairs were placed back under the authority of the cruiser type commander. The cruiser type command had originally begun as an umbrella senior position, known as the Befehlshaber der Aufklärungsstreitkräfte (B.d.A.), which commanded all cruiser type vessels as well as serving as the superior officer for the type commanders of torpedo boats and minesweepers. This position was held by four Kriegsmarine officers between 1935 and 1941, when the title was disbanded and merged with the Befehlshaber der Schlachtschiffe (B.d.S).

=== Commander of Surface Craft (1935–1941) ===
- Vice admiral Hermann Boehm (Inaugural holder - carried over position from Reichsmarine since September 1934)
- Vice admiral Hermann Densch (September 1937 - October 1939)
- Vice admiral Günther Lütjens (October 1939 - April 1940)
- Vice admiral Hubert Schmundt (April 1940 - October 1941)

=== Commander of Cruisers (1942–1944) ===
Between April and May 1942, the German surface fleet was reorganized with the torpedo boat and battleship type commands discontinued and placed under the authority of a new cruiser command known as the Befehlshaber der Kreuzer (B.d.K.). Vice Admiral Oskar Kummetz then became the first cruiser type commander serving until November 1943 when he was succeeded by Konteradmiral Erich Bey. In June 1944, the cruiser type command was renamed as the Befehlshaber der Kampfgruppe (B.d.K.) and the position assumed by Rear Admiral Rudolf Peters, who held the title until the end of the war.

The Kriegsmarine had in commission a total of sixteen battleship and cruiser type vessels during the Second World War.

- Battleships
  - Bismarck (sunk May 1941)
  - Tirpitz (sunk November 1944)
  - Gneisenau
  - Scharnhorst (sunk December 1943)
- Heavy Cruisers
  - Lützow
  - Admiral Scheer
  - Admiral Graf Spee (sunk December 1939)
  - Admiral Hipper
  - Blücher (sunk April 1940)
  - Prinz Eugen
- Light cruisers
  - Emden
  - Königsberg (sunk April 1940)
  - Karlsruhe (sunk April 1940)
  - Köln
  - Leipzig
  - Nürnberg

== Destroyers ==
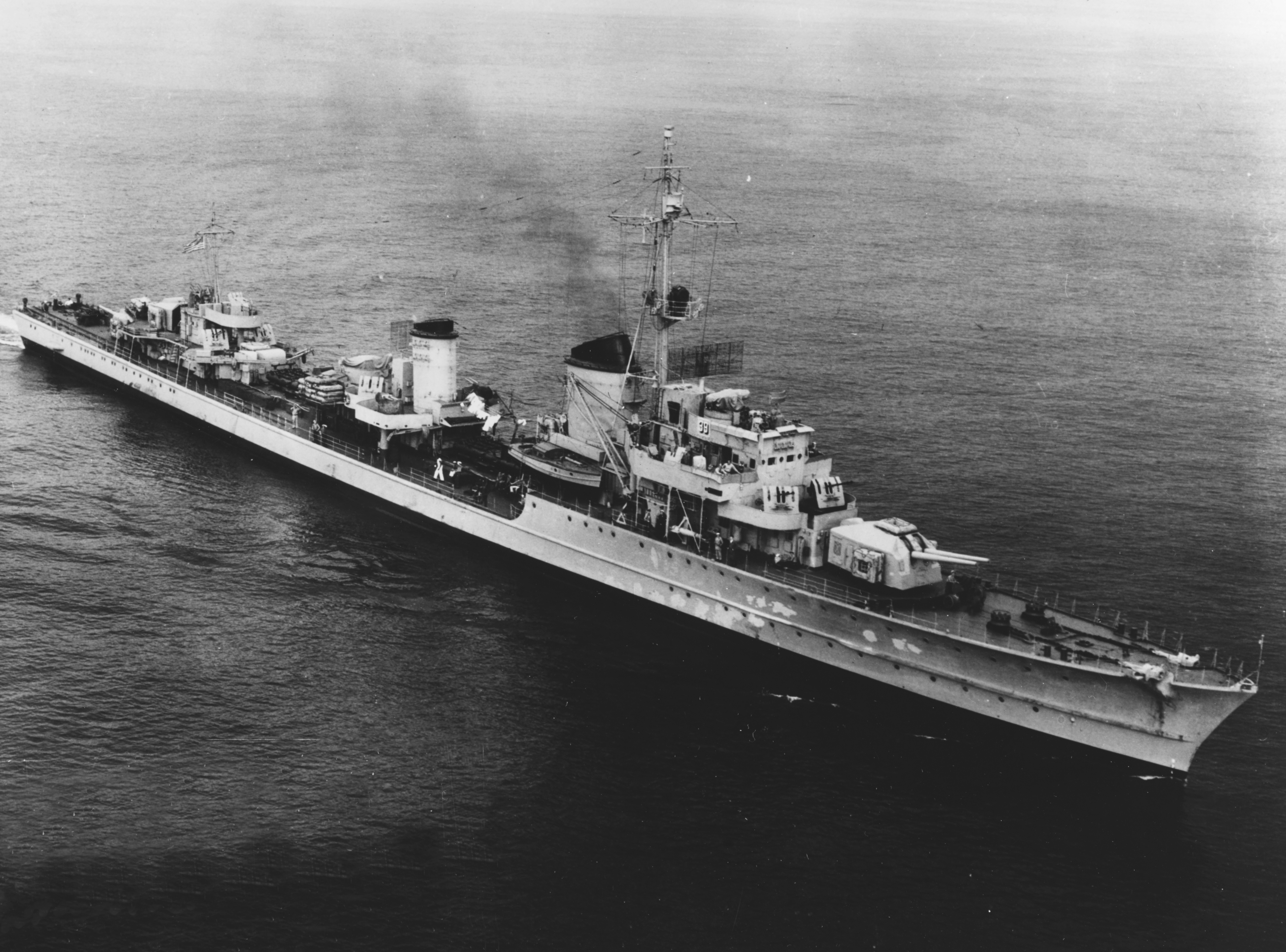
German destroyers were administratively under the authority of a type commander, but deployed operationally under Navy Group commands

The posting of commander of destroyers (Führer der Zerstörer) was first created in November 1939; prior to that time, all destroyer development and deployment had been under the authority of the commander of torpedo boats. All German destroyers were further divided into eight administrative flotillas (Z-Flotille), each contained between four and five destroyer with its own flotilla commander and flagship. Operationally, destroyers were deployed under the authority of the naval group commanders, leaving the commander of destroyers as little more than administrative head with little tactical control. In April 1942, the position was increased in its responsibility when all German torpedo boats were placed under the administrative control of the leader of destroyers.

The following officers served as commander of destroyers during the Second World War.

- Kommodore Friedrich Bonte (November 1939 – April 1940)
  - Duties assumed by deputy, Korvettenkapitän Schemmel, April–May 1940
- Kapitan zur See Erich Bey (May 1940 – December 1943)
- Kapitan zur See Max-Eckart Wolff (December 1943 – February 1944)
- Vizeadmiral Leo Kreisch (February 1944 – May 1945)

Ten destroyer escorts were also constructed by the Kriegsmarine for use in convoy protection duties. These ships were interspersed among five escort flotillas augmented by converted civilian craft and torpedo boats of the Torpedoboot Ausland program. A type commander for escort ships was never established with these vessels administratively under the command of the commander of destroyers.

== Submarines ==
The commander of submarines held the most authority and independence of any type commander and possessed direct operational and deployment ability. This was in contrast to other vessel class commanders which were administratively assigned with deployment and tactical operations usually under a Navy group commander. Karl Dönitz was the first and longest serving commander of submarines, a title which he inaugurated in January 1936 as the Führer der Unterseeboote. In the early days of Dönitz's tenure, his submarine force consisted of a single flotilla which he also commanded. At the height of World War II, the submarine force consisted of several U-boat regional commands within which were interspersed over thirty U-boat flotillas.

The submarine force would see its greatest amount of combat in the Battle of the Atlantic. Dönitz himself personally directed the movement of individual submarines from his headquarters and also invented the "wolfpack" concept where submarines would group together to attack multiple targets. The wolf packs were temporary tactical formations and were not permanently maintained as the U-boat flotillas were. U-boat flotillas and regions also did not maintain flagships on a particular U-boat, but instead operated from an established shore headquarters.

In January 1943, Dönitz succeeded Erich Raeder as Commander-in-Chief of the German Navy. In his new position, Dönitz channeled most of the remaining resources of the Kriegsmarine into the submarine force, leading to a neglect and downsizing of the surface fleet. Dönitz also retained his title as commander of submarines, but left the day-to-day operations to his deputy Eberhard Godt.

== Torpedo and Attack boats ==
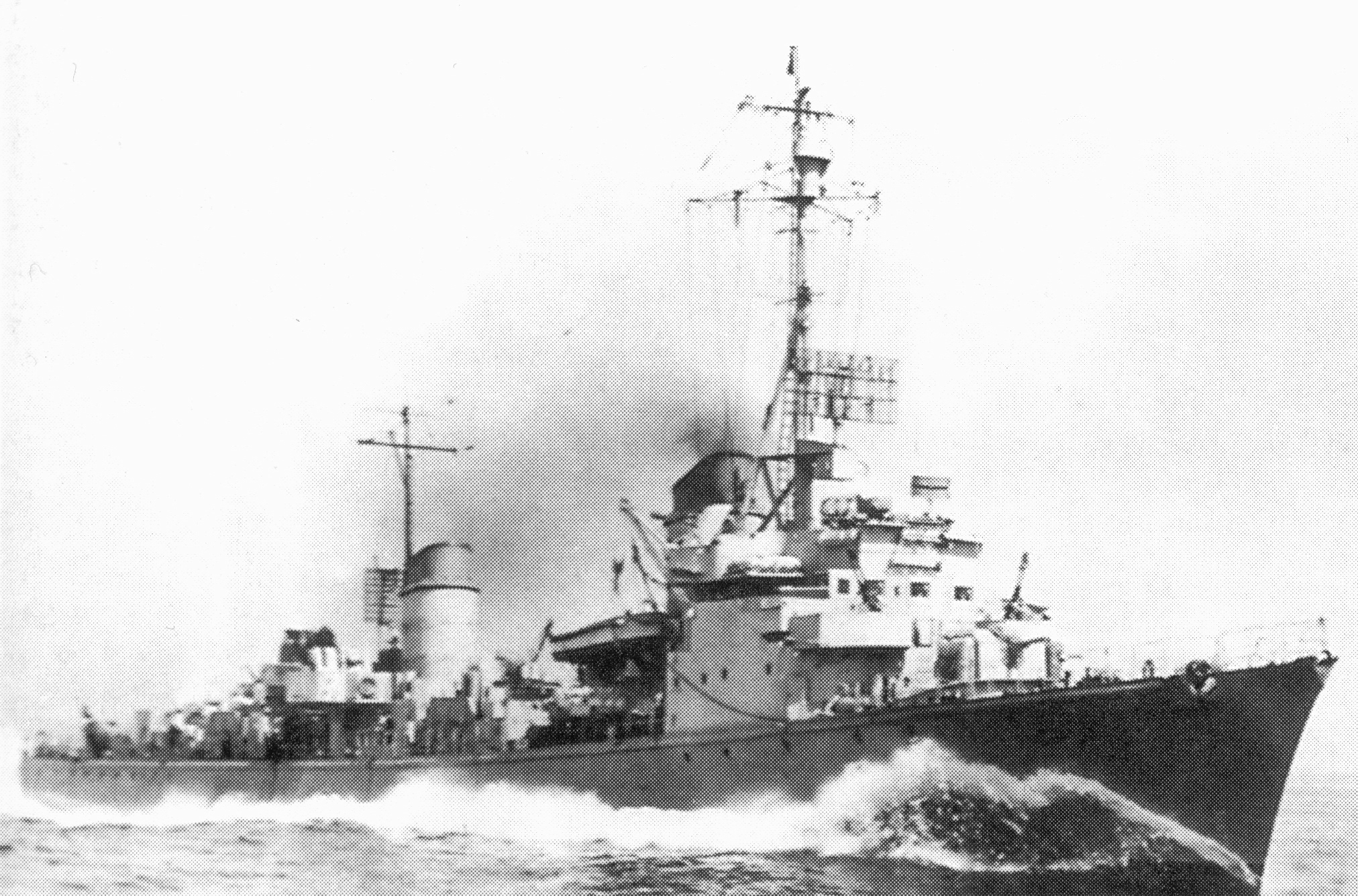
A German torpedo boat in 1945

The position Führer der Torpedoboote dated in the German Navy from before the First World War and had existed as a command for all German surface craft during the inter-war years of the 1930s. By the outbreak of World War II, torpedo boats were organized into ten separate Torpedobootsflottille, mostly consisting of between ten and twelve torpedo destroyers. During the first years of the war, the Leader of Torpedo-boats was administratively assigned as a subordinate to the Befehlshaber der Aufklärungsstreitkräfte. The torpedo boat leader postilion carried little operational authority; in April 1942, the position was disbanded with all torpedo boats placed under the administrative command of the Leader of Destroyers.

=== Leader of Torpedo-boats (1935–1942) ===
- Oskar Kummetz: (inaugural holder - carried over position from Reichsmarine)
- Günther Lütjens: (October 1937 – October 1939)
- Friedrich Bonte: (October–November 1939)
- Hans Bütow: (November 1939 – April 1942)

=== Leader of Attack Boats ===
German Navy fast attack boats, also known as S-boats or E-boats, were organized into twenty four Schnellbootsflottille, collectively known as the Schnellbootseinheiten. These attack boats were operationally controlled by various commands of the German Navy and administratively had originally been under the command of the Leader of Torpedo-boats. In April 1942, the attack boats were separated to become their own type class and placed under the command of the Führer der Schnellboote. Kommodore Rudolf Petersen was the only officer to hold this title during World War II.

== Motorboats and Auxiliary craft ==
A command for German motorboats, mainly consisting of inland waterway craft as well as small support vessels, was established in January 1941 as a subordinate to the Netherlands Navy Regional Command. The command was known as Der Führer der Motorbootsverbände. There were three flotillas of motor craft originally attached, these being the Donauflottille, Rheinflottille, and Flußräumflottille Niederlande. In 1942, the Donauflottille was renamed as the Maasflottille

=== Leader of Motorboats (1941–1945) ===
- Korvettenkapitän Hans Stubbendorff (January–April 1941)
- Korvettenkapitän Gustav Strempel (April 1941 – January 1942)
- Kapitänleutnant Hanns Mitzka (January–March 1942)
- Korvettenkapitän Alfred Griesinger (March 1942 – December 1943)
- Korvettenkapitän Erich Schimmelpfennig (December 1943 – March 1944)
- Korvettenkapitän Alfred Griesinger (March–September 1944)
- Korvettenkapitän der Reserve Heinrich Engel (September 1944 – March 1945)
