= Leopold Siemens =

- Vice admiral Siemens in 1942
- Born: 17 May 1889; Berlin
- Died: 7 December 1979 (aged 90); Cologne
- Military career
- Allegiance: German Empire (to 1919); Weimar Republic (to 1933); Nazi Germany
- Branch: Imperial German Navy; Reichsmarine; Kriegsmarine
- Service years: 1911–45
- Rank: Vizeadmiral
- Commands: Cruiser Karlsruhe
- Conflicts: World War I World War II

Leopold Siemens (17 May 1889 - 7 December 1979) was a Vice admiral in the Kriegsmarine during World War II. He served as captain of the cruiser Karlsruhe in the mid-1930s and held the short lived position of Deputy fleet commander of the German Navy (2. Admiral der Flotte) in 1941.

== Early life and career ==
Siemens was born 1889 in Berlin and joined the Imperial German Navy in 1911 as a Midshipman. During World War I he held junior officer billets, including a tour on board the cruiser Victoria Louise. He continued his career after the surrender of Germany, serving in the Reichsmarine, and when the Nazi Party came to power in Germany, and established the Nazi state, Siemens was a lieutenant commander serving as a mid-level staff officer.

On September 23, 1935, as a naval commander, Siemens was given command of the cruiser Karlsruhe. He was promoted to captain the following year and held this command until September 1937.

== Second World War ==
Siemens was a senior captain upon the outbreak of World War II and was promoted to flag rank in January 1940. A year later, he was selected to serve under Günther Lütjens as deputy fleet commander of the German Navy. The position did not entail at-sea command, but was an administrative posting overseeing the type commanders within the organization of the Kriegsmarine. After Lütjens was killed on board the battleship Bismarck, Siemens continued his post briefly under Otto Schniewind before the position was disbanded in June 1941.

Promoted to Vizeadmiral in 1942, Siemens was appointed as naval commander of the Norwegian coast in 1943. The following year he was posted to the staff of the naval region Baltic Sea and was released to inactive duty in January 1945.

== Post war ==
Leopold Siemens died 7 December 1979 in Cologne, Germany.

== Summary of Career ==
Dates of rank

- Fähnrich zur See: 15 April 1911
- Leutnant zur See: 27 September 1913
- Oberleutnant zur See: 22 March 1916
- Kapitänleutnant: 1 January 1921
- Korvettenkapitän: 1 March 1929
- Fregattenkapitän: 1 October 1934
- Kapitän zur See: 1 April 1936
- Konteradmiral: 1 January 1940
- Vizeadmiral: 1 April 1942
