= Surface flotillas of the Kriegsmarine =

German surface vessels at anchor in 1942

Surface flotillas of the Kriegsmarine were organizational groupings of German naval vessels during World War II based on class of vessel and geographical location. Surface flotillas were not operationally deployed units, but functioned through the administrative command chain of the Kriegsmarine.

== Overview and higher command ==
Surface flotillas were first formed in 1938 from preexisting surface divisions, some of which had existed since before the First World War. The surface flotillas were primarily used for mid to smaller class vessels, such as destroyers and minesweepers, while capital ships and heavy cruisers were considered "stand alone" vessels answering directly to a vessel type commander. Surface flotilla commanders reported to a type commander for their particular class of vessel. The Fleet commander of the Kriegsmarine, to which the vessel type commanders answered, was the highest authority for all flotillas.

Submarine flotillas were unique in that they were considered operationally deployed commands and answered directly to the Commander of Submarines, oftentimes bypassing other chains of command, including the Fleet commander of the Kriegsmarine. Intermediary regional commands also existed for most U-boat flotillas. Miniature submarines were under the command of the German Navy's special operations branch.

Late in World War II, the German Navy began consolidating several types of harbor defense units, along with their associated flotillas, into a series of naval security divisions. In most cases, the original surface flotillas were then placed as subordinate units to the security divisions.

== Destroyer flotillas ==
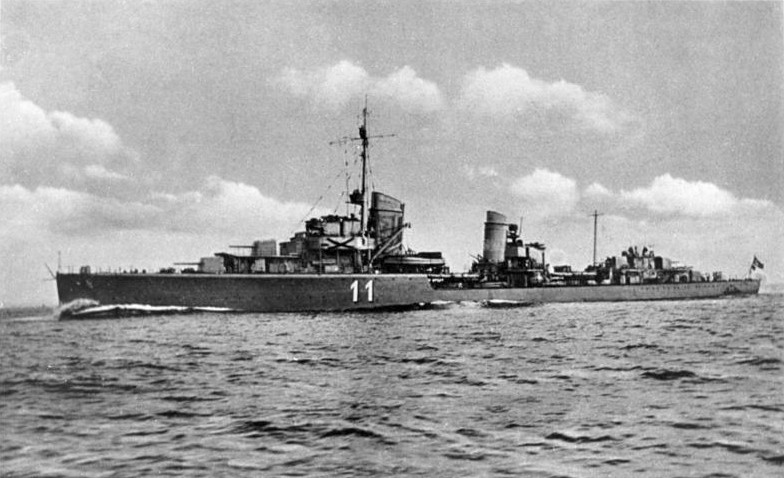
German destroyer Z4 Richard Beitzen underway before World War II

German destroyer flotillas were the most recognizable surface units as they were organized along classic naval lines with a designated flotilla flagship and commander. Unlike most of the other surface flotilla commands, which operated out of shore offices, destroyer flotillas commanders were embarked onboard flagship vessels (known as Die Führerzerstörer) and would occasionally put to sea along with the vessels of their command. The destroyer Leberecht Maass (Z1) was the first flotilla's designated flagship in 1939, later replaced by the Wilhelm Heidkamp (Z21) and then the Z28 in 1943.

There were eight destroyer flotillas authorized by the Kriegsmarine during the Second World War, of which seven were eventually established. The standard rank for a destroyer flotilla commander (Flottillenchef) was Kapitän zur See, although some flotillas were commanded by officers ranked as Fregattenkapitän. Each flotilla staff also contained an engineering officer (Die Flottilleningenieure) who was normally a Korvettenkapitän. In tactical situations, destroyer flotillas commanders were often designated as small group leaders, as was the case during the invasion of Norway.

List of Destroyer flotillas

Flotilla	Formed/Predecessor Unit	Assigned vessels
1. Zerstörer-Flottille	July 1939 (1st & 3rd Destroyer Divisions)	Georg Thiele (Z2), Max Schultz (Z3), Richard Beitzen (Z4), Friedrich Ihn (Z14), Erich Steinbrinck (Z15), Friedrich Eckoldt (Z16)
2. Zerstörer-Flottille	October 1939 (2nd Destroyer Division)	Paul Jacobi (Z5), Theodor Riedel (Z6), Hermann Schoemann (Z7), Bruno Heinemann (Z8)
3. Zerstörer-Flottille	December 1939 (5th Destroyer Division)	Diether von Roeder (Z17), Hans Lüdemann (Z18), Hermann Künne (Z19), Karl Galster (Z20), Anton Schmitt (Z22)
4. Zerstörer-Flottille	April 1939 (6th & 8th Destroyer Division)	Wolfgang Zenker (Z9), Hans Lody (Z10), Bernd von Arnim (Z11), Erich Koellner (Z13)
4. Zerstörer-Flottille	Reformed in 1942	Z31, Z32, Z33, Z34, Z37, Z38, Z39
5. Zerstörer-Flottille	May 1940 (1st Destroyer Flotilla)	Paul Jacobi (Z5), Theodor Riedel (Z6), Erich Steinbrinck (Z15), Friedrich Eckoldt (Z16)
5. Zerstörer-Flottille	Reformed in 1942	Richard Beitzen (Z4), Hermann Schoemann (Z7), Friedrich Ihn (Z14), Z25, Z29
6. Zerstörer-Flottille	May 1940 (2nd, 3rd, & 4th Destroyer Flotillas)	Paul Jacobi (Z5), Theodor Riedel (Z6), Hermann Schoemann (Z7), Bruno Heinemann (Z8), Hans Lody (Z10), Karl Galster (Z20), Z33, Z36, Z43
8. Zerstörer-Flottille	December 1940	Z23, Z24, Z25, Z26, Z27, Z28, Z29, Z30

=== Torpedo-boat flotillas ===
During the Second World War, the Kriegsmarine authorized the formation of ten flotillas for the "auxiliary destroyers", or German torpedo boats. The torpedo boat flotillas were formed from preexisting commands of the Reichsmarine, known as Torpedobootsflottille, several of which had been founded during or before World War I. Of the ten authorized World War II torpedo boat flotillas, nine were commissioned (8.Torpedobootsflottille was authorized but never formed).

List of Torpedo-boat flotillas

Flotilla	Formed	Assigned vessels	Primary Class
1. Torpedobootsflottille	1935	T1, T2, T3, T4, T9, T10	Type 35 torpedo boat
2. Torpedobootsflottille	1935	T5, T6, T7, T8, T11, T12	Type 35 torpedo boat
3. Torpedobootsflottille	1937	T13, T14, T15, T16, T17, T18, T19, T20, T21	Type 37 torpedo boat
4. Torpedobootsflottille	1937	T22, T23, T24, T25, T26, T27	Elbing-class torpedo boat
5. Torpedobootsflottille	1938	TB Albatross, TB Greif, TB Falke, TB Kondor, TB Möwe	Type 23 torpedo boat
5. Torpedobootsflottille	1938	TB Tiger	Sleipner-class destroyer
5. Torpedobootsflottille	1938	T34, T35, T36	Elbing-class torpedo boat
6. Torpedobootsflottille	1937	T28, T29, T30, T31, T32, T33	Elbing-class torpedo boat
7. Torpedobootsflottille	1940	TB Panther, TB Löwe	Sleipner-class destroyer
7. Torpedobootsflottille	1940	TB Leopard	Type 24 torpedo boat
9. Torpedobootsflottille	1943	TA14, TA15, TA16, TA17, TA18, TA19, TA37, TA38, TA39	Torpedoboot Ausland
10. Torpedobootsflottille	1944	TA23, TA24, TA27, TA28, TA29, TA30, TA31, TA32, TA33	Torpedoboot Ausland

=== Escort flotillas ===
Escort flotillas were the smallest number of surface units to be created, due in part to the Kriegsmarine limited use of the destroyer escort type vessel. The Kriegsmarine would only construct ten F-class escort ships which were originally grouped into two escort flotillas (1. und 2. Geleitflottille) formed in 1937 and 1938 respectively. In September 1942, the Kriegsmarine authorized two additional escort flotillas and formed the 31. Geleitflottille to which were assigned fifteen "auxiliary patrol ships", with hull numbers G-3101 through G-3115. In the summer of 1943, the Kriegsmarine further formed the 30. Geleitflottille to which were assigned thirteen auxiliary escort ships (mostly converted civilian craft) with hull designations "D", "FZ", and "MR".

In March 1943, the Kriegsmarine overhauled the escort flotillas and ordered the formation of five new flotillas (1 through 5 Geleitflottille) utilizing foreign boats of the Torpedoboot Ausland program, "G class" auxiliary patrol ships, as well as auxiliary cutter ships designated by hull number "SG". The original F class escort ships were interspersed into the new flotillas, with the bulk of these ships assigned to the 5. Geleitflottille.

The final order of battle for the escort flotillas was:

- 1. Geleitflottille (March 1944 - March 1945): 13 Torpedoboot Ausland (TA) torpedo boats.
- 2. Geleitflottille (March 1944 - May 1945): 5 TA boats and 10 G type auxiliary patrol boats
- 3. Geleitflottille (March 1943 - June 1944): 7 TA boats and three SG type auxiliary cutters
- 4. Geleitflottille (March 1943 - August 1943): 5 TA boats
- 5. Geleitflottille (April 1945 - May 1945): 4 F-class escorts and 4 TF class auxiliary torpedo-boats

== Minesweeper flotillas ==
Minesweeper flotillas were organized into over forty flotillas for the regular minesweepers, as well as thirty five auxiliary minesweeper units. A third category of flotilla existed for the Sperrbrecher "mine barrage" craft. The first minesweeper flotilla of the Kriegsmarine was formed in 1936 from pre-existing units of the Reichsmarine which had maintained two minesweeper and one auxiliary minesweeper flotilla during the inter-war years. The first auxiliary minesweeper flotilla was formed shortly afterwards in October 1937.

Minesweeper flotillas were considered administrative units, operating from shore offices, and did not maintain a standard flagship as was the case with the destroyer flotillas. The standard rank for a minesweeper flotillas commander was that of Korvettenkapitän.

== Attack boat flotillas ==
The Kriegsmarine authorized twenty five Schnellboot flotillas for formation during the Second World War, of which fourteen were eventually established. The German Navy also maintained an attack boat training division (Schnellboots-Lehr-Division) consisting of four training flotillas. In November 1943, the 3rd, 7th, 21st, 22nd, and 24th S-boat flotillas were consolidated into the 1st S-Boat Division (1. Schnellbootsdivision).

The standard S-boat flotilla consisted of eight boats in 1939-40 (established strength often exceeding operational strength through maintenance or attrition), although some flotillas later in the war operated as few as six or in excess of twelve. Flotillas were commanded by officers ranked as Kapitänleutnant while S-boat divisions were commanded by those ranked Fregattenkapitän.

=== Patrol boat flotillas ===
Vorpostenboote were auxiliary naval vessels, often converted civilian craft for use as harbor patrol and sentry vessels. These patrol boats were organized into thirty five primary flotillas covering the various German naval ports. An additional two "security flotillas" (the 7th and 13th Sicherungsflotille) were formed in early 1943 for general port security duties.

Patrol boat flotillas were strictly administrative and operated from shore offices, most often commanded by an officer ranked as either Kapitänleutnant or Korvettenkapitän.

=== Submarine chaser flotillas ===
Submarine chasers were designated as "UJ" class vessels (U-Bootjäger) and were augmented by "service war craft" (KT class vessels) which were usually smaller converted ships used as ASW trawlers. Beginning in 1940, German minelayers (Minenschiffe) were also administratively attached to the submarine chaser flotillas. The standard rank for a submarine chaser flotilla commander was Korvettenkapitän.

List of submarine chaser flotillas

- 1st UJ-Flottille (Baltic Sea)
- 2nd UJ-Flottille (Adriatic Sea)
- 3rd UJ-Flottille (Black Sea)
- 11th UJ-Flottille (Norway)
- 12th UJ-Flottille (North Sea)
- 14th UJ-Flottille (Atlantic Coast)
- 17th UJ-Flottille (Norway)
- 21st UJ-Flottille (Aegean Sea)
- 22nd UJ-Flottille (Tyrrhenian Sea)
- 23rd UJ.-Flottille (Black Sea)

In 1943, a "13th UJ Group" (13. UJ-Gruppe) had also been formed from vessels of the smaller flotilla units.

Minelayers attached to submarine chaser units

- Hansestadt Danzig - (11. UJ-Flottille)
- Cobra - (12. UJ-Flottille)
- Kaiser - (12. UJ-Flottille)
- Roland - (12. UJ-Flottille)
- Königin Louise - (13. UJ-Gruppe)
- Preussen - (17. UJ-Flottille)
- Tannenberg - (17. UJ-Flottille)
- Schiff 23 - (17. UJ-Flottille)

=== Submarine net flotillas ===
Known as Netzsperrflottille, these units were composed of small craft designed to mount submarine netting within German harbors. Submarine net flotillas were typically commanded by an officer ranked as Korvettenkapitän. A typical flotilla would be composited of between three and five "net layer" vessels and upwards of twelve to fifteen "net tender" vessels. Submarine net flotillas were designated by geographical regions; for larger regions, flotillas could be sub-divided into smaller submarine net groups (Netzsperrgruppe). Some of the large submarine netting groups were further subdivided into Arbeitsgebiet (Working Areas) to cover smaller ports and harbors.

List of submarine net flotillas

- Netzsperrflottille Nord
  - Group 1 - Kirkenes (Arbeitsgebiet "Petsamo" and "Kraftwerk Jäniskowski")
  - Group 2 - Narvik (Arbeitsgebiet "Kaafjord" and "Langfjord bis Oftenfjord")
  - Group 3 - Trondheim (Arbeitsgebiet "Oftenfjord")
  - Group 4 - Bergen (Arbeitsgebiet "Kristiansund-Nord" and "Kristiansund-Süd")
  - Group 5 - Drammen (Arbeitsgebiet "Olsofjord")
- Netzsperrflottille Italien
  - Group 1 - La Spezia (Arbeitsgebiet "Westküste Italiens" and "Bucht von Genua")
  - Group 2 - Pola (Arbeitsgebiet "Adria")
- Netzsperrflottille West - (Atlantic Coast)
  - Group 1 - English Channel
  - Group 2 - French Atlantic Coast
  - Group 3 - Southern French Coast
- Netzsperrflottille Schwarzes Meer
- Netzsperrflottille Mitte
- Netzsperrflottille Süd
- Netzsperrflottille Nordsee

In March 1943, a new unit known as Netzsperrgruppe Dänemark was formed strictly for submarine netting activities in Denmark. Units of the command were reallocated from Netzsperrflottille Mitte.

== Transport flotillas ==
Transport flotillas were administrative units designed to oversee the maintenance and deployment of German Navy water transport craft, such as ferries and barges. The standard rank for a transport flotilla commander was Kapitänleutnant.

List of Transport Flotillas

- 1. Transportflottille (1st Transport Flotilla): Established May 1943 in France and in July move to Italy with seventeen landing craft. Headquarters at Sanremo and later Imperia.
- 2. Transportflottille (2nd Transport Flotilla): Formed in September 1943 from units of the 1st Transport Flotilla. Headquartered in Venice, also oversaw transport operations in the Adriatic Sea.
- 3. Transportflottille (3rd Transport Flotilla): Formed in mid 1944 from various ad hoc transport units which had existed in France and the Low Countries. In August of that year, moved its headquarters to Simferopol and then Constanza. In October 1944, headquarters transferred to Niederrhein as a "ferry command" under Army Group B.
- 4. Transportflottille (4th Transport Flotilla): Established in early 1944 as an inland ferry and water transport command for transit through the Dardanelles into the Black Sea. Also oversaw transport activities in the Aegean Sea from its headquarters in Thessaloniki.
- 5. Transportflottille (5th Transport Flotilla): Established in March 1944 as an additional transport command for the Aegean Sea. Headquartered first at Salonica before relocating to Piraeus.
- 6. Transportflottille (6th Transport Flotilla): Formed from units of the 2nd Transport Flotilla for transit activities in the Adriatic, Ligurian, and Ionian Seas. Also operated service vessels through the Corinth Canal.

In 1944, three additional transport flotillas were formed to administrative waterborne transport and landing craft for specific geographic regions. Transportflottille Niederlande was the first to be formed in September 1944 for transport craft in the Netherlands. This was followed by Transportflottille Niederrhein and Transportflottille Ruhr. In the summer of 1944, the Kriegsmarine also formed a Baltic Sea transport unit known as Transportflottille der KMD Danzig. The final transport unit formed was Fährflottille Waal, created in September 1944, to oversee barges and ferries on the Waal River.

=== Landing craft flotillas ===
German Navy landing craft (Marinefährprahm) were grouped into twenty separate flotillas (Landungsflottillen) during the Second World War with the first landing craft flotilla established in November 1941 for operations in the Black Sea. In tactical situations, transport craft were deployed by the Navy groups as part of landing operations. Each landing craft flotilla was assigned between twenty and thirty separate craft (designated as "F" hull numbered vessels), although some early flotillas had as little as eight to ten assigned vessels. The standard landing craft flotilla commander rank was either Oberleutnant zur See or Kapitänleutnant.

== Service craft flotillas ==
German motorboats and inland waterway craft were placed under Kriegsmarine naval control in 1941 and formed into three flotillas. The original units were the Donauflottille, Rheinflottille, and the Flußräumflottille Niederlande. These units administrated German motorboats on the Danube, the Rhine and within the territorial waters of the Netherlands. The units were slightly reorganized in 1942 when the Danube flotilla was renamed as the Maasflottille. The standard rank for a service craft flotilla commander was Kapitänleutnant with the flotilla commanders answering to the Leader of Motorboats.

=== Artillery barge flotillas ===
German artillery craft, which were essentially manned artillery and anti-aircraft guns mounted on ocean and river barges, were grouped into eight separate flotillas (Artillerieträger-Flottillen) during the Second World War. These units had originally been formed in 1940 as two separate Flakjäger-Gruppe before being re-designated as Flakjäger-Flottille in 1941. The following year, the units were again reorganized into artillery barge flotillas.

The standard rank for an artillery barge flotilla commander was Kapitänleutnant with the flotilla command administrative in nature and operating from shore offices. The standard complement of an artillery barge flotilla was between fifteen and eighteen vessels, designated as "AF" craft.

In February 1943, a command for Black Sea artillery barges was formed in Konstanza known as the 3. Marineartillerieleichter-Flottille. The flotilla was attached eight "marine artillery ships", designated by the hull prefix MAL. By 1943, the command had been renamed as the Artillerieträger-Flottille Asowsches Meer (Artillery Barge Flotilla Sea of Azov) and now contained flak artillery vessels (designated hull number "F") as well as "security artillery vessels" designated with the hull prefix "SAT". In January 1945, the flotilla gained an additional water security craft listed as "Motorprahm D 154".

Black Sea Artillery Flotilla Vessels

- Original vessels: MAL 1, MAL 2, MAL 3, MAL 4, MAL 8, MAL 9, MAL 10, MAL 11
- Additional vessels assigned: MAL 51, MAL 52, MAL 53, MAL 54, MAL 55, MAL 56
- Flak artillery vessels: F 379, F 410, F 457, F 490, F 600, F 617, F 880, F 980, F 981, F 1048
- Security artillery vessels: SAT 5, SAT 6, SAT 7, SAT 8, SAT 10, SAT 11, SAT 13, SAT 14, SAT 15, SAT 16, SAT 17
