= Marinestation der Ostsee =

The Marinestation der Ostsee (Baltic Sea Naval Station) was a command of both the Imperial German Navy, and the Reichsmarine which served as a shore command for German naval units operating primarily in the Baltic Sea. The station was headquartered at Kiel and was a counterpart command to the Marinestation der Nordsee.

== History ==
The original founding of the Baltic Sea Naval Station predates the existence of the modern German state. The station was first established 1854 in Danzig and was relocated to Kiel in March 1865. During these early years, the station was operated by the Prussian Navy.

At the start of the Franco-Prussian War in July 1870, the command consisted of relatively minor forces: the flagship of Konteradmiral (Rear Admiral) Eduard Heldt was the aviso SMS Preussischer Adler, based in Kiel. Also in Kiel, he had the artillery training ship SMS Renown and the gunboats SMS Cyclop, SMS Camäleon, SMS Habicht, and SMS Scorpion. Based in Stralsund were the gunboats Blitz and Fuchs, and at Danzig was the screw corvette Nymphe.

The station was a major command during World War I and continued to exist, under the administration of the Weimar Republic, through the 1920s. After the Nazi Party took power in Germany, and established the Nazi state, the Reichsmarine continued to administer the Baltic station until the founding of the Kriegsmarine in 1935. At that time, the station command was renamed as the Kommandierender Admiral der Marinestation der Ostsee. This title remained until 1943 when the organizational name was changed to that of Marineoberkommando Ostsee.

== Commanders ==
Prussian Navy

- Konteradmiral Eduard Heldt: 1870

Imperial Navy

- Admiral Ludwig von Schröder: 1910-1912

Reichsmarine

- Vizeadmiral Otto Schultze: 1933-1935

Kriegsmarine

No.	Portrait	Name	Took office	Left office	Time in office
1	Conrad Albrecht	Admiral; Conrad Albrecht (1880–1969)	July 1935	November 1938	3 years, 4 months
2	Rolf Carls	Admiral; Rolf Carls (1885–1945)	November 1938	January 1940	1 year, 2 months
3	Günther Guse [de]	Admiral; Günther Guse (1886–1953)	January 1940	March 1943	3 years, 2 months
4	Hubert Schmundt	Admiral; Hubert Schmundt (1888–1984)	March 1943	March 1944	1 year
5	Oskar Kummetz	Generaladmiral; Oskar Kummetz (1891–1980)	March 1944	May 1945	1 year, 2 months
