= List of German naval ports during World War II =

The following is a list of German naval ports during World War II. Ports operated by the Kriegsmarine were divided into two classes - major and minor. For most major ports, a port commander (Hafenkommandanten) was the senior most officer in charge of the port. Ports in the same geographical area were grouped together under administrative units known as Hafenkommandanten im Bereich. Vessels assigned within German ports were organized into harbor defense flotillas.

Smaller ports were overseen by "Port captains" (Hafenkapitäne); however, in some larger ports this title was also used for the port commander. Both major and minor port commanders reported to a naval area commander (Der Kommandant im Abschnitt), who in turn administratively reported to a Navy district commander. For operational military defense, ports were also assigned to one of several sea defense zones.

== Major German Ports ==
For major ports within Germany, a position of "Naval Superintendent" (Marineintendantur) served as the port commander and answered directly to the commanders of the Navy regions. Naval superintendent positions established during World War II included Bremen, Wilhelmshaven, Kiel, and Hamburg. The superintendent at Kiel also possessed a deputy port captain.

Naval superintendents were allocated a staff of various department heads to oversee activities in the various German ports. These include a building superintendent (Marine-Baudirektion), naval arsenal (Kriegsmarinearsenal), personnel office (Kriegsmarinedienststelle), and communications unit (Marinenachrichtenabteilung). The larger German ports also typically maintained a naval brig (Prisenhof).

== North Sea and Baltic Sea ==
Kriegsmarine ports in the North and Baltic Seas were organized into the following two geographical areas.

Hafenkommandanten im Bereich der Nordsee

Port commanders

- Hafenkommandant Delfzijl
- Hafenkommandant Groningen
- Hafenkommandant Harlingen

Port captains

- Hafenkapitän Emden
- Hafenkapitän Helgoland

Hafenkommandanten im Bereich der Ostsee

Port commanders

- Hafenkommandant Eckernförde
- Hafenkommandant Mürwik
- Hafenkommandant Neustadt
- Hafenkommandant Stralsund
- Hafenkommandant Swinemünde

Port captains

- Hafenkapitän Danzig-Neufahrwasser
- Hafenkapitän Gotenhafen
- Hafenkapitän Hela
- Hafenkapitän Kiel
- Hafenkapitän Libau
- Hafenkapitän Memel
- Hafenkapitän Pillau
- Hafenkapitän Travemünde
- Hafenkapitän Warnemünde
- Hafenkapitän Windau

Hafenkommandanten im Bereich des Marinebefehlshabers Dänemark

Port commanders

- Hafenkommandant Esbjerg
- Hafenkommandant Tyborön

Port captains

- Hafenkapitän Aalborg
- Hafenkapitän Aarhus
- Hafenkapitän Esbjerg
- Hafenkapitän Frederica
- Hafenkapitän Frederikshavn
- Hafenkapitän Gjedser
- Hafenkapitän Helsingör
- Hafenkapitän Hirtshals
- Hafenkapitän Kalundborg
- Hafenkapitän Kopenhagen
- Hafenkapitän Korsör
- Hafenkapitän Nyborg (Ryborg)
- Hafenkapitän Skagen
- Hafenkapitän Tyborön

== Norway ==
German ports in occupied Norway were among the more numerous of sea ports outside of Germany's given Norway's direct access to the North Sea.

Hafenkommandanten im Bereich des Kommandierenden Admirals Norwegen

Port commanders

- Hafenkommandant Haugesund
- Hafenkommandant Kirkenes

Port captains

- Hafenkapitän Aalesund
- Hafenkapitän Alta
- Hafenkapitän Andalsnens
- Hafenkapitän Arendal
- Hafenkapitän Bergen
- Hafenkapitän Bodö
- Hafenkapitän Brevik
- Hafenkapitän Brönnöysund
- Hafenkapitän Drontheim
- Hafenkapitän Egersund
- Hafenkapitän Farsund
- Hafenkapitän Flatöy
- Hafenkapitän Hammerfest
- Hafenkapitän Hamnbukt (Kirkenes)
- Hafenkapitän Harstad
- Hafenkapitän Haugesund
- Hafenkapitän Honningsvaag
- Hafenkapitän Horten
- Hafenkapitän Kirkenes
- Hafenkapitän Knarrevik
- Hafenkapitän Kopervik
- Hafenkapitän Kristiansund-Nord
- Hafenkapitän Kristiansand-Süd
- Hafenkapitän Larvik
- Hafenkapitän Lervik
- Hafenkapitän Lödingen
- Hafenkapitän Maalöy
- Hafenkapitän Mo
- Hafenkapitän Molde
- Hafenkapitän Mosjöen
- Hafenkapitän Namsos
- Hafenkapitän Narvik
- Hafenkapitän Oslo
- Hafenkapitän Petsamo
- Hafenkapitän Rörvik
- Hafenkapitän Sandnessjöen
- Hafenkapitän Stavanger
- Hafenkapitän Svolvaer
- Hafenkapitän Tromsö
- Hafenkapitän Vadsö
- Hafenkapitän Vardö

== France and the Low Countries ==
German ports in the occupied Netherlands and France are listed below.

Hafenkommandanten im Bereich des Marinebefehlshabers der Niederlande

Port commanders

- Hafenkommandant Amsterdam
- Hafenkommandant Antwerpen
- Hafenkommandant Den Helder
- Hafenkommandant Hoek van Holland
- Hafenkommandant Ijmuiden
- Hafenkommandant Rotterdam
- Hafenkommandant Vlissingen

Port captains

- Hafenkapitän Harlingen
- Hafenkapitän Groningen

Hafenkommandanten im Bereich des Kommandierenden Admirals Frankreich bzw.

Port commanders

- Hafenkommandant Arcachon
- Hafenkommandant Bayonne
- Hafenkommandant Bordeaux
- Hafenkommandant Boulogne
- Hafenkommandant Brest
- Hafenkommandant Caen
- Hafenkommandant Calais
- Hafenkommandant Cherbourg
- Hafenkommandant Dieppe
- Hafenkommandant Dünkirchen
- Hafenkommandant Fécamp
- Hafenkommandant Granville
- Hafenkommandant Gravelines
- Hafenkommandant Honfleur
- Hafenkommandant La Pallice
- Hafenkommandant La Rochelle
- Hafenkommandant Le Havre
- Hafenkommandant Le Tréport
- Hafenkommandant Lorient
- Hafenkommandant Marseille
- Hafenkommandant Morlaix
- Hafenkommandant Nantes
- Hafenkommandant Port de Bouc
- Hafenkommandant Port Vendres
- Hafenkommandant Rochefort
- Hafenkommandant Rouen
- Hafenkommandant Sète
- Hafenkommandant St. Nazaire
- Hafenkommandant Trouville

Port captains

- Hafenkapitän Cannes
- Hafenkapitän La Ciotat
- Hafenkapitän Le Tréport
- Hafenkapitän Les Sables d'Olonne
- Hafenkapitän Lezardieux
- Hafenkapitän Nizza
- Hafenkapitän St. Louis de Rhone
- Hafenkapitän Royan
- Hafenkapitän St. Malo
- Hafenkapitän St. Tropez

=== Channel Islands ===
- Hafenkommandant Alderney
- Hafenkommandant Guernsey
- Hafenkommandant Jersey
- Hafenkommandant Kanalinseln or Channel Islands

=== Belgium ports ===
The following Belgium ports were overseen by the port authorities in occupied France

- Hafenkommandant Nieuport (Flanders)
- Hafenkommandant Ostende
- Hafenkommandant Zeebrügge

== Black Sea and Aegean sea ==
German ports in the Black Sea and the Aegean were organized into two geographical areas

Hafenkommandanten im Bereich des Admirals Schwarzes Meer

Port commanders

- Hafenkommandant Berdjansk
- Hafenkommandant Genitschesk
- Hafenkommandant Feodosia
- Hafenkommandant Jalta
- Hafenkommandant Kertsch
- Hafenkommandant Mariupol
- Hafenkommandant Nikolajew
- Hafenkommandant Odessa
- Hafenkommandant Otschakow
- Hafenkommandant Sewastopol
- Hafenkommandant Taganrog

Port captains

- Hafenkapitän Ak Metschet
- Hafenkapitän Balaklawa
- Hafenkapitän Cherson
- Hafenkapitän Eupatoria
- Hafenkapitän Nogaisk
- Hafenkapitän Nowo-Petrowskoje
- Hafenkapitän Otschakow-Nord
- Hafenkapitän Skadowsk

Hafenkommandanten im Bereich des Admirals Ägäis

Port commanders

- Hafenkommandant Canea
- Hafenkommandant Chalkis
- Hafenkommandant Chios
- Hafenkommandant Iraklion
- Hafenkommandant Kalamata
- Hafenkommandant Kephalonia
- Hafenkommandant Korfu
- Hafenkommandant Menemvasia
- Hafenkommandant Milos
- Hafenkommandant Mudros
- Hafenkommandant Mytilene
- Hafenkommandant Navarino
- Hafenkommandant Nauplia
- Hafenkommandant Nicolaos
- Hafenkommandant Patras
- Hafenkommandant Piräus
- Hafenkommandant Prevesa
- Hafenkommandant Rafina
- Hafenkommandant Rhodos
- Hafenkommandant Saloniki
- Hafenkommandant Suda
- Hafenkommandant Syra
- Hafenkommandant Vathi Karlovasi
- Hafenkommandant Volos

Port captains

- Hafenkapitän Skopelos
- Hafenkapitän Koupho

=== Baltic sea ports ===
The Baltic sea ports of Latvia, Lithuania, and Estonia were under the command of the Hafenkommandanten im Bereich des Admirals Ostland. Two more major harbors, under port commanders, were at Riga and Reval. Smaller harbors, under port captains, were as follows.

- Hafenkapitän Baltischport
- Hafenkapitän Krivorutschi
- Hafenkapitän Libau
- Hafenkapitän Lowkolowo (Saint Petersburg)
- Hafenkapitän Peipa
- Hafenkapitän Pernau
- Hafenkapitän Rutschi
- Hafenkapitän Windau

== Mediterranean Sea ==
German ports in the Mediterranean Sea were overseen by a single command encompassing all Italian, Albanian, and Dalmatian harbors. The Italian naval area was the only one of the three regions to maintain smaller harbors at the port captain level.

Hafenkommandanten im Bereich Italien, Dalmatien und Albanien

- Hafenkommandant Ajaccio
- Hafenkommandant Ancona
- Hafenkommandant Cattaro
- Hafenkommandant Cherso
- Hafenkommandant Dubrovnik
- Hafenkommandant Durazzo
- Hafenkommandant Fiume
- Hafenkommandant Genua
- Hafenkommandant Gravosa
- Hafenkommandant La Spezia
- Hafenkommandant Livorno
- Hafenkommandant Pola
- Hafenkommandant Ravenna
- Hafenkommandant Sebenico
- Hafenkommandant Senj
- Hafenkommandant Sestri Levante
- Hafenkommandant Split
- Hafenkommandant Triest
- Hafenkommandant Valona
- Hafenkommandant Venedig
- Hafenkommandant Viareggio
- Hafenkommandant Zara

Hafenkapitäne im Bereich Italien

- Hafenkapitän Bonifacio
- Hafenkapitän Burano
- Hafenkapitän Caorle
- Hafenkapitän Fano
- Hafenkapitän Imperia
- Hafenkapitän Pesaro
- Hafenkapitän Porto Ferraie
- Hafenkapitän Rimini
- Hafenkapitän San Remo
- Hafenkapitän Santa Margherita
- Hafenkapitän Savona
- Hafenkapitän Senigallia
- Hafenkapitän Senstri Lavante
- Hafenkapitän Ventimiglia
