= Sea defense zone =

Defensive areas used by Kriegsmarine in WW2

During World War II, a sea defense zone (Seeverteidigung) was a tactical area in the organization of the Kriegsmarine intended to provide operational command of all German naval forces, within a given geographical area, in the event of actual enemy attack on the coastline of occupied Europe.

== History ==
The first sea defense zones were established in the spring of 1940 to protect the large amount of coast line which Germany had acquired after invading the Low Countries, Denmark, Norway, and France. Originally, commanders of the sea defense zones were known as "coastal commanders" (Küstenbefehlshaber). In the summer of 1940, in preparation for Operation Sea Lion, the Kriegsmarine established seven "sea command sectors" (Seebefehlsstellen) which were commanded by officers ranked Kapitän zur See. All of the sea command sectors had been disestablished by the end of 1941.

Original Sea Command Sectors (1940)

- Seebefehlsstelle Antwerpen - Antwerp (Sep 1940 - May 1941)
- Seebefehlsstelle Boulogne - Boulogne-sur-Mer (Aug - Oct 1940)
- Seebefehlsstelle Dünkirchen - Dunkirk (Aug - Oct 1940)
- Seebefehlshaber Le Havre - Le Havre (Aug - Oct 1940)
- Seebefehlshaber Rotterdam - Rotterdam (Jun 1940 - Dec 1940)
- Seebefehlshaber Ostende - Ostend (Aug - Oct 1940)
- Seebefehlshaber West - Calais (Aug 1940 - Mar 1941)

In the spring 1940, the Kriegsmarine began to reorganize coastal defense under a new position known as Kommandant der Seeverteidigung (Sea Defense Zone Commander). Between 1941 and 1945, the sea defense zones were expanded and retracted, gaining and losing territory to other zones or to the advance of allied or Red Army (Soviet) forces. Logistically, the sea defense zones were strictly a Navy command, but were integrated into the Atlantic Wall which was generally overseen by the German Army.

== Command and control ==
Sea defense zones were normally commanded by an officer ranked as either Kapitän zur See or Konteradmiral. The sea defense zone commander answered to a Navy regional commander and would take tactical control over all shore forces in a given area should an enemy launch an attack against a segment of German coastline.

The only units permanently assigned to a sea defense zone were naval artillery batteries and anti-aircraft units. These units also maintained their own administrative chain of command in addition to falling under operational control of a sea defense zone. During an actual enemy attack, the sea defense commander became the direct superior for all Navy units in the zone's geographical area. This included all harbor defense units as well as naval infantry regiments. Typically, the sea defense zone commander would appoint as a deputy the commander of a major German port. The defense zone commander would himself report to a naval region commander who then acted in the capacity as a ground forces divisional commander. The ultimate command authority for all sea defense zones were the Navy Group commanders.

== List of sea defense zones ==
Defense zone	Established	Headquarters	Region	Group	Disestablished
"Albanien"	Sep 1943	Tirana	Adriatic	South	Jan 1945
"Attika"	Feb 1941	Corinth	Adriatic	South	Oct 1944
"Baltischen Inseln"	Sep 1944	Lithuania	Eastern Baltic	North	Nov 1944
"Bergen"	Apr 1940	Hardanger	Central Norway	North	Apr 1944
"Boulogne"	July 1940	Boulogne	France	West	Dec 1940
"Brest"	July 1940	Brest	France	West	Dec 1940
"Bretagne"	July 1940	Brest	France	West	Sep 1944
"Calais"	July 1940	Calais	France	West	Dec 1941
"Dänische Inseln"	Apr 1944	Copenhagen	Denmark	North	May 1945
"Dalmatien"	Sep 1943	Split	Adriatic	South	Apr 1944
"Dodekanes"	Dec 1943	Porto Lago	Adriatic	South	Oct 1944
"Drontheim"	Jul 1940	Trondheim	Northern Norway	North	May 1945
"Dünkirchen"	Jul 1940	Dunkirk	France	West	Dec 1941
"Elbe-Weser"	Nov 1944	Cuxhaven	German Bight	North	Jan 1945
"Estland"	Feb 1944	Lithuania	Eastern Baltic	North	Sep 1944
"Französische Riviera"	Sep 1943	Toulon	Southern France	West	Jan 1944
"Gascogne"	Jul 1941	Bordeaux	Atlantic Coast	West	Jan 1944
"Hammerfest"	Mar 1942	Nordkinnhalvøya	Polar Coast	North	Jan 1944
"Harstad"	Jan 1945	Narvik	Polar Coast	North	May 1945
"Istrien"	Sep 1943	Susak	Adriatic	South	Dec 1944
"Italienische Riviera"	Sep 1943	Nizza	Southern France	South	Dec 1944
"Kanalinseln"	Jul 1942	Channel Islands	Channel Coast	West	Jul 1944
"Kirkenes"	Mar 1941	Porsangerfjorden	Polar Coast	North	Mar 1942
"Kreta"	Jun 1941	Crete	Aegean Sea	South	Oct 1944
"Kristiansand-Süd"	May 1940	Langesund	Southern Norway	North	Aug 1940
"Languedoc"	Jan 1941	Toulon	Southern France	West	Jul 1944
"Lemnos"	Jul 1941	Lemnos	Aegean Sea	South	Apr 1944
"Lettland"	Jan 1942	Libau	Eastern Baltic	North	Sep 1944
"Libau"	Apr 1941	Libau	Eastern Baltic	North	Jan 1943
"Loire"	Dec 1940	Carnac	Atlantic Coast	West	Jun 1944
"Mecklenburg"	Apr 1945	Heiligendamm	Western Baltic	North	May 1945
"Mittelholland"	Nov 1944	Amsterdam	Netherlands	West	May 1945
"Molde"	May 1940	Stadtlandet	Central Norway	North	May 1945
"Narvik"	Jun 1940	Narvik	Polar Coast	North	May 1945
"Norddalmatien"	Apr 1944	Sebenico	Adriatic	South	Nov 1944
"Nordfriesland"	Nov 1944	Husum	German Bight	North	May 1945
"Nordgriechenland"	Apr 1944	Thessaloniki	Aegean Sea	South	Oct 1944
"Nordholland"	Jun 1940	Scheveningen	Netherlands	West	Feb 1945
"Nordjütland"	Apr 1940	Frederikshavn	Denmark	West	Nov 1944
"Normandie"	Feb 1941	Cherbourg	Channel Coast	West	Jun 1944
"Oslofjord"	Apr 1941	Larvik	Norway	North	May 1944
"Ostende	Aug 1940	Calais	Channel Coast	West	Dec 1941
"Ostfriesland"	Feb 1944	Tidofeld	German Bight	North	Apr 1945
"Ost und Westpreußen	Dec 1944	Gotenhafen	Eastern Baltic	North	Jan 1945
"Ostpreußen"	Jan 1945	Pillau	Eastern Baltic	North	May 1945
"Pas de Calais"	Dec 1941	Calais	Channel Coast	West	Oct 1944
"Peloponnes"	Sep 1943	Kalamata	Aegean Sea	South	Sep 1944
"Polarküste"	Jul 1940	Finnfjordbotn	Polar Coast	North	Apr 1945
"Pommern"	Nov 1944	Swinemünde	Western Baltic	North	Apr 1945
"Saloniki"	Feb 1941	Kevalla	Aegean Sea	South	Apr 1944
"Sandnessjöen"	Jul 1940	Rørvik	Northern Norway	North	May 1945
"Schleswig-Holstein und Mecklenburg"	Nov 1944	Kiel	Western Baltic	North	May 1945
"Seine-Somme"	Feb 1941	Le Havre	Channel Coast	West	Sep 1944
"Stavanger"	May 1940	Haugesund	Central Norway	North	May 1945
"Südddalmatien"	Apr 1944	Split	Adriatic	South	Nov 1944
"Südholland"	Jun 1940	Middelburg	Netherlands	West	Nov 1944
"Südjütland" (Note: From 1940 to 1944 the command was known in its full title as "Der Kommandant im Bereich Südjütland und Dänische Inseln". The name was shortened to simply "Südjütland" in April 1944.)	Apr 1940	Copenhagen	Netherlands	West	Nov 1944
"Tromsö"	Jul 1940	Finnfjordbotn	Polar Coast	North	May 1945
"Ukraine" (Note: Originally established as Seekommandant "V" before changing names in January 1942 to Seekommandant "U". By the summer of 1942 was known by the final name of Kommandant der Seeverteidigung Ukraine. Reestablished in May 1943 after being disbanded the previous winter.)	Nov 1941	Nikolajew	Black Sea	Independent	Dec 1942
"Ukraine"	May 1943	Nikolajew	Black Sea	Independent	Dec 1943
"Westkrim" (Note: Established in August 1942 as Seekommandant "X". By the start of 1943 was known as Seekommandant Kaspisches Meer. Shifted that summer to the command's final name of Kommandant der Seeverteidigung Westkrim. Merged with the Ukraine sea defense zone in May 1943.)	Aug 1942	Nikolajew	Black Sea	Independent	May 1943
"Westadria""	Sep 1943	Lido bei Venedig	Adriatic	South	Apr 1945
"Westgriechenland"	Aug 1943	Patras	Aegean Sea	South	Oct 1944
"Westpreußen"	Jan 1945	Gotenhafen	Eastern Baltic	North	Mar 1945
