= Max Bastian =

German admiral (1883-1958)

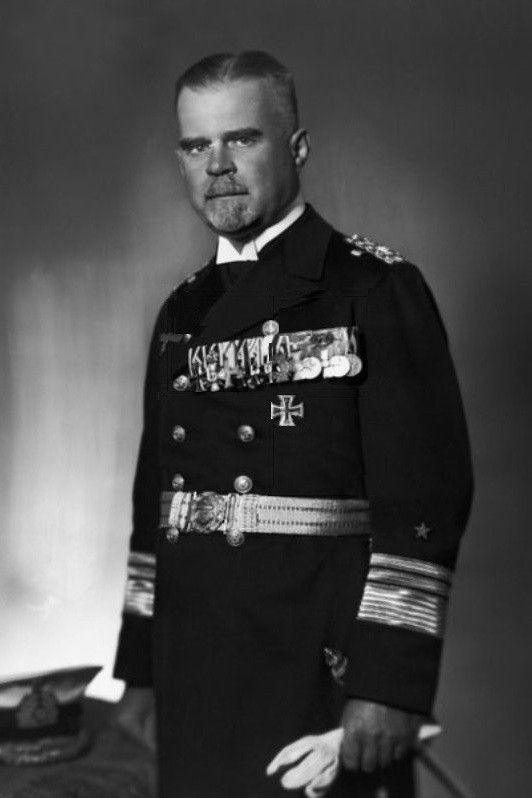
- Bastian in 1943

President of the Reichskriegsgericht
- In office 12 September 1939 – 30 November 1944
- Preceded by: Walter Heitz

Personal details
- Born: 28 August 1883 Berlin, German Empire
- Died: 11 March 1958 (aged 74) Wilhelmshaven, Germany

Military service
- Allegiance: German Empire (1902-1918); Weimar Republic (1918-1933); Nazi Germany (1933-1944)
- Branch/service: Imperial German Navy; Reichsmarine; Kriegsmarine
- Years of service: 1902–1944
- Rank: Admiral
- Commands: Reichskriegsgericht
- Battles/wars: World War I World War II
- Awards: Iron Cross, 1st and 2nd class Knight's Cross of the War Merit Cross

Max Bastian (28 August 1883 – 11 March 1958) was a German Admiral in the Kriegsmarine during World War II who served as president of the Reich Military Court until his retirement in 1944.

== Naval career ==
Bastian was born in Berlin in 1883 and entered the Imperial German Navy in 1902. He participated in World War I and, at the end of the war, he was a Kapitänleutnant and a second admiralty staff officer with the Baltic Sea reconnaissance force. He remained in the post-war Reichsmarine, and was promoted to Konteradmiral in January 1933, Vizeadmiral in January 1935 and Admiral in January 1938. He was the commander of line ships from October 1932 to September 1934. He then served as Admiral II of the Baltic Sea at Kiel until September 1935, and then was posted as a staff officer and department head at the Oberkommando der Marine (OKM), the naval high command.

In 1939, Bastian was made president of the Reich Military Court. While serving in this position, he oversaw the death penalties of multiple conscientious objectors within the Wehrmacht. He was briefly represented by Paul von Hase while ill in 1943. Bastian retired in November 1944.

== Awards and decorations ==
- Iron Cross, 1st and 2nd class
- Knight's Cross of the House Order of Hohenzollern with swords
- Military Merit Cross of Mecklenburg-Schwerin 2nd class
- Hanseatic Cross of Bremen
- Hanseatic Cross of Hamburg
- Hanseatic Cross of Lübeck
- Honour Cross of the World War 1914/1918
- Knight's Cross of the War Merit Cross

== See also ==
- Flag officers of the Kriegsmarine

== Sources ==
- Bastian, Max. Badhoevedorp, Netherlands: Traces of War.
- Dermot, Bradey (1988). Deutschlands Admirale 1849–1945. Die militärischen Werdegänge der See-, Ingenieur-, Sanitäts-, Waffen- und Verwaltungsoffiziere im Admiralsrang..
- Webb, James Jack (2024). Generals and Admirals of the Third Reich: For Country or Fuehrer. Vol. 1: A–G. Havertown, PA: Casemate Publishers. ISBN 978-1-952-71512-9.
