= Commander of Ships of the Line =

Naval command of the Reichsmarine

The Commander of Ships of the Line (Befehlshaber der Linienschiffe) was a naval command of the Reichsmarine, as well as briefly the Kriegsmarine, from 1930 through 1936. The commander of liners was an administrative posting assigned to oversee the development and deployment of German capital ships, but did not operationally control the ships once at sea (this function was reserved for naval station commands).

== History ==
The office of Commander of Ships of the Line was first established in the Reichsmarine in 1930 and was intended as a command to encompass larger vessels, such as the pocket battleships. Previously the Reichsmarine had administratively maintained these vessels under the Leader of Torpedo-boats. As Germany was prohibited from developing battleship technology by the Treaty of Versailles, the office of Commander of Ships of the Line was intentionally set up to avoid any references to larger battleship type vessels.

Under the Reichsmarine, four officers held the position of Commander of Ships of the Line

- Vizeadmiral Walther Franz: 1 Jan 1930 - 27 Feb 1930
- Konteradmiral Richard Foerster: 27 Feb 1930 - 27 Sep 1932
- Konteradmiral Max Bastian: 1 Oct 1932 - 28 Sep 1934
- Konteradmiral Rolf Carls: 29 Sep 1934 - 20 May 1935

== Transition to Kriegsmarine ==
On May 21, 1935, the German Navy was renamed as the Kriegsmarine with most of the former Reichsmarine offices carried over into the new organizational structure. The Commander of Ships of the Line remained under Rear Admiral Rolf Carls who held the position as a Kriegsmarine flag officer from 21 May 1935 to 30 September 1936. On October 1, 1936 the Kriegsmarine was reorganized and the position of Commander of Ships of the Line was disbanded.

On November 25, 1936, the command was reestablished as the Befehlshaber der Panzerschiffe (B.d.P.) (Commander of Armored Ships) with Rolf Carls reappointed to the position. The battleship command was in turn left vacant in 1939 until reestablished in 1941 and the following year merged with the type command for German cruisers.
