= Hans Bütow =

German admiral

- Born: 28 December 1894; Volpersdorf, Silesia
- Died: 9 May 1974 (aged 79); Hamburg-Langenhorn, Germany
- Military career
- Allegiance: Nazi Germany
- Branch: Kriegsmarine
- Rank: Konteradmiral
- Commands: Führer der Torpedoboote
- Conflicts: World War II
- Awards: Knight's Cross of the Iron Cross

Hans Ernst Arnold Felix Bütow (28 December 1894 – 9 May 1974) was a German admiral during World War II. He was a recipient of the Knight's Cross of the Iron Cross of Nazi Germany.

== Awards ==
- Wehrmacht Long Service Award 1st Class (1 April 1939)
- Sudetenland Medal (30 October 1939)
- Clasp to the Iron Cross (1939) 2nd Class (14 April 1940) & 1st Class (1 August 1940)
- Order of the Cross of Liberty 1st Class with Swords (12 October 1941)
- Knight's Cross of the Iron Cross on 12 March 1941 as Kapitän zur See and Führer der Torpedoboote (leader of torpedo boats)
