= Fleet commander (Kriegsmarine) =

Highest ranked administrative officer in the organization of the Kriegsmarine

The Fleet commander of the Kriegsmarine (Flottenchef) was the highest ranked administrative officer in the organization of the Kriegsmarine, and served as a member of the Oberkommando der Marine. The fleet commander did not actually serve as commander of an at-sea fleet, but instead was the senior officer to which the vessel type commanders reported. The position of fleet commander was created from an older position of the Reichsmarine known as Der Oberbefehlshaber der Seestreitkräfte.

In 1926, the position adopted the name Flottenchef, but was declared defunct one year later and left vacant with no assigned officer. The title became a position within the Kriegsmarine in 1936.

== Fleet commanders ==
The following naval officers served in the position as Fleet commander of the Kriegsmarine.

No.	Picture	Fleet commander	Took office	Left office	Time in office
1	Rolf Carls	Admiral; Rolf Carls (1885–1945)	21 December 1936	31 October 1938	1 year, 314 days
2	Hermann Böhm	Admiral; Hermann Böhm (1884–1972)	1 November 1938	21 October 1939	354 days
3	Wilhelm Marschall	Admiral; Wilhelm Marschall (1886–1976)	21 October 1939	7 July 1940	260 days
4	Günther Lütjens	Admiral; Günther Lütjens (1889–1941)	7 July 1940	27 May 1941 †	324 days
5	Otto Schniewind	Generaladmiral; Otto Schniewind (1887–1964)	12 June 1941	31 July 1944	3 years, 49 days
6	Wilhelm Meendsen-Bohlken	Vizeadmiral; Wilhelm Meendsen-Bohlken (1897–1985)	31 July 1944	8 May 1945	281 days

From December 1940 to June 1941, a deputy to the fleet commander was established known by the title 2. Admiral der Flotte. The only officer to hold this position was Konteradmiral Leopold Siemens.

== Relationships with other components ==
The fleet commander, by practice, was typically most closely associated with the German battleship branch. Most fleet commanders would make their flagship on-board one of Germany's larger capital ships. Günther Lütjens, while serving as fleet commander, embarked on board the battleship Bismarck and also tactically commanded the ship during the Battle of the Denmark Strait. Lütjens was later killed on the Bismarck, making him the only fleet commander to die in active combat.

The fleet commander was not, by design, an operational officer, and thus could only advise the Navy group commanders who served as the operational heads of the various at-sea German forces. For this reason, there was significant jurisdictional conflict between the fleet commander and the group commanders. In mid 1943, the Kriegsmarine leadership attempted to solve this problem by merging the office of fleet commander with that of a group commander. A new position, Marinegruppenkommando Nord und Flottenchef was then created giving the fleet commander operational control over deployed forces in the North Sea.

The fleet commander was also technically the senior officer to the commander of submarine forces (Befehlshaber der U-Boote); however, in this capacity Karl Dönitz operated with near total independence, including the tactical deployment of his U-boats with little regard for the wishes of either the fleet or group commanders.

== Disestablishment ==
The position of fleet commander was disbanded upon the defeat of Nazi Germany in May 1945. In the modern day German Navy, the position of Inspector of the Navy is somewhat equivalent to that of fleet commander.
