= Werner Lange =

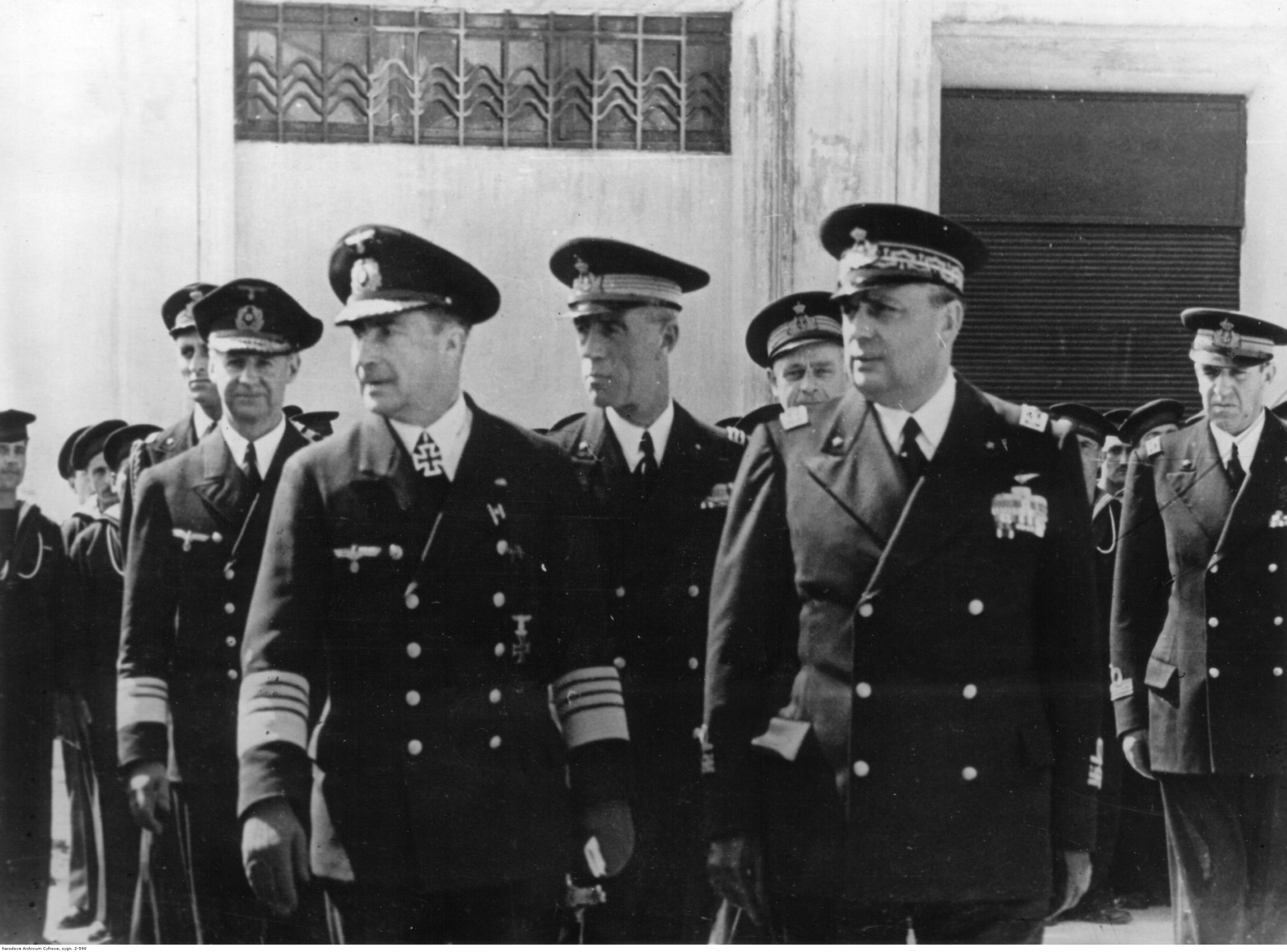
- Werner Lange (outer left, behind Kurt Fricke) in Athens 1943
- Born: 18 July 1893
- Died: 19 November 1965 (aged 72)
- Military career
- Allegiance: German Empire; Weimar Republic; Nazi Germany
- Branch: Kriegsmarine
- Service years: 1912–45
- Rank: Vizeadmiral
- Commands: Cruiser Emden
- Conflicts: World War II
- Awards: Knight's Cross of the Iron Cross

Werner Lange (18 July 1893 – 19 November 1965) was a Vizeadmiral with the Kriegsmarine during World War II and recipient of the Knight's Cross of the Iron Cross.

== Awards ==
- Iron Cross (1914) 2nd Class (15 May 1916) & 1st Class (1 February 1918)
- U-boat War Badge (1918) (14 December 1918)
- Hanseatic Cross of Hamburg (20 April 1918)
- The Honour Cross of the World War 1914/1918 (2 March 1935)
- Clasp to the Iron Cross (1939) 2nd Class (16 October 1939) & 1st Class (27 May 1940)
- German Cross in Gold on 8 January 1944 as Vizeadmiral and commanding admiral of the Aegean Sea
- Knight's Cross of the Iron Cross on 28 October 1944 as Vizeadmiral and commanding admiral of the Aegean Sea
