= Alfred Saalwächter =

German Navy Admiral (1883–1945)

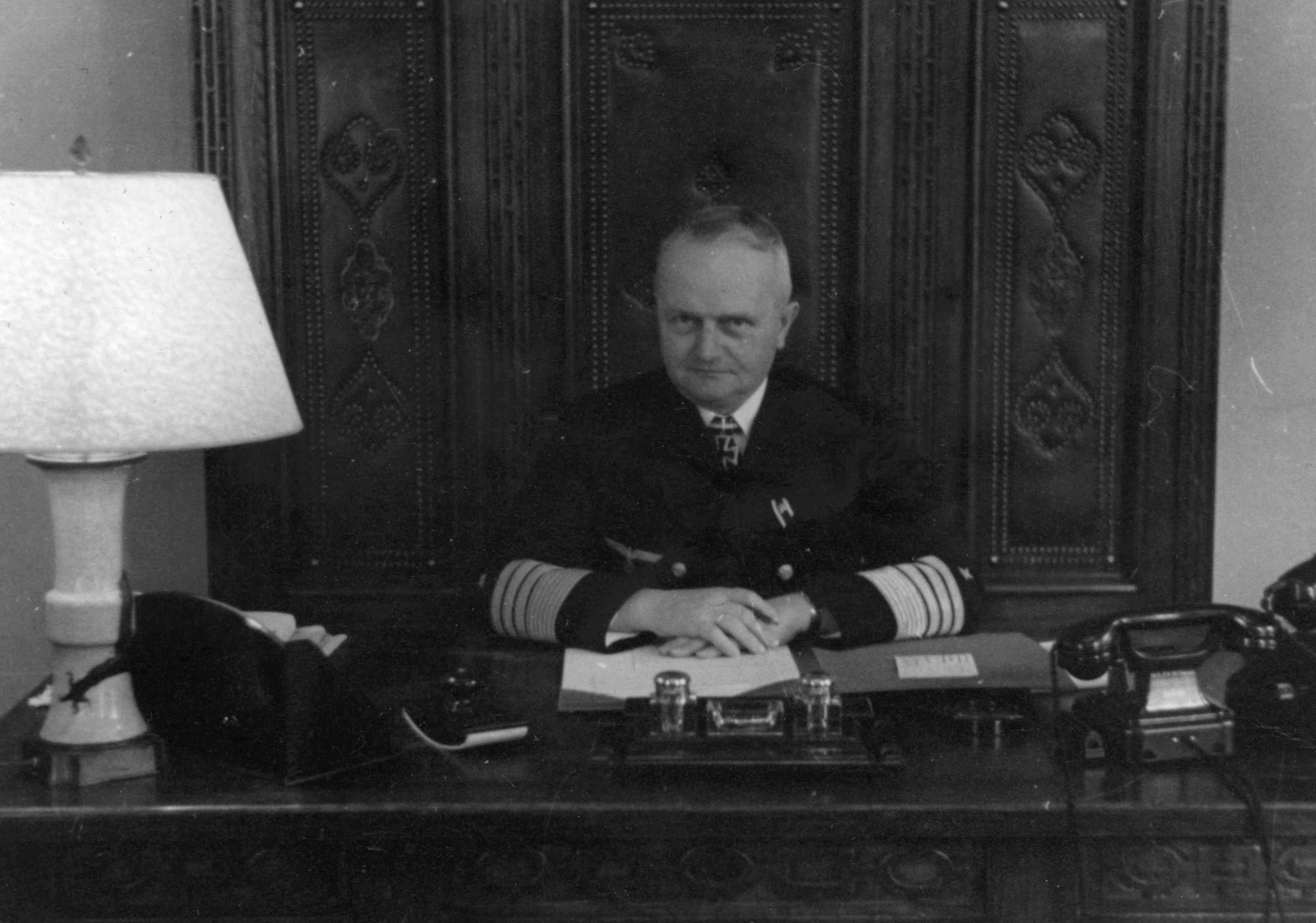
- Saalwächter in 1940
- Born: 10 January 1883; Neusalz an der Oder, German Empire
- Died: 6 December 1945 (aged 62); Moscow, Soviet Union
- Military career
- Allegiance: German Empire; Weimar Republic; Nazi Germany
- Branch: Imperial German Navy; Reichsmarine; Kriegsmarine
- Service years: 1901–1942
- Rank: Generaladmiral
- Units: Moltke; Hertha; Hessen; Friedrich der Grosse; Braunschweig; Gneisenau
- Commands: U-25; U-46; U-94; Schlesien
- Conflicts: World War I; World War II; Operation Cerberus
- Awards: Knight's Cross of the Iron Cross

Alfred Saalwächter (10 January 1883 – 6 December 1945) was a high-ranking German U-boat commander during World War I and General Admiral during World War II.

== Early life ==
Saalwächter was born in Neusalz an der Oder, Prussian Silesia, as the son of a factory manager. He entered the Kaiserliche Marine as a Seekadett on 10 April 1901, and was trained on SMS Moltke and Hertha. On 29 September 1904 he was promoted to Leutnant zur See. Saalwächter then served with Bordkommando units, first with the 2. Matrosen-Division, then on Hessen with the 2. Werft-Division. He was promoted to Oberleutnant zur See on 10 March 1906; until 1908, he served with the 2. Torpedo-Division as adjutant to the I. Abteilung. Saalwächter also served on Gneisenau.

Saalwächter served on Hannover in 1910 and later on Westfalen as Flaggleutnant to Vice Admiral Hugo von Pohl, commander of the I. Marine-Geschwader. Saalwächter was promoted to Kapitänleutnant on 10 April 1911 and joined the admiralty in Berlin. He remained in the admiralty until 1915, with his last position there being head of the signal section in the operations department. In 1912 he received the Order of the Red Eagle.

== World War I ==
On 1 April 1915 during World War I, Saalwächter became Flaggleutnant on Friedrich der Grosse, the flagship of the High Seas Fleet. In February 1916 he transferred to the U-boat service. After graduating from submarine school, he commanded U-25 (unknown period of command), U-46, and U-94 from September 1916 to March 1918. He was awarded for his success with the Iron Cross 1st Class and the Knight's Cross of the House Order of Hohenzollern.

== Interwar era ==
In 1920, Saalwächter was named a Korvettenkapitän of the Provisional Reichsmarine. He also served on Braunschweig as an admiralty officer. After a leave of absence, Saalwächter joined the Marineleitung in the Personnel Department on 17 May 1920. From 15 October 1923 till 31 March 1925 he served as 1. Asto in the staff of the Commander of Naval Forces. On 24 September 1926 he took command of the light cruiser Amazone, and, a year later, under promotion to Fregattenkapitän of the battleship Schlesien. On 2 October 1933 Saalwächter was named inspector for naval instruction. During the following five years he had a strong influence on the development of the young officer corps. He was promoted to Vizeadmiral on 1 April 1935 and Admiral on 1 June 1937. Saalwächter was named Commanding Admiral of Naval Station North Sea at Wilhelmshaven, one of the highest positions in the Kriegsmarine at the time, on 28 October 1938.

On 2 March 1939, Saalwächter sent a report to the Naval High Command in which he openly discussed the acquisition of bases in Norway. The report stressed both the dangers to Germany of British dominance in Norwegian waters and the favourable change in the geo-strategic position that a German occupation of Norway would bring about.

== World War II ==
With the outbreak of World War II in September 1939, Saalwächter received command of Marine-Gruppenkommando West and was responsible for operations in the North Sea, which led to disputes between himself and the fleet commanders, Vice Admirals Hermann Boehm, Wilhelm Marschall, and Günther Lütjens.

On 1 January 1940 Saalwächter was promoted to Generaladmiral. Along with Admiral Rolf Carls, Saalwächter had tactical command of Operation Weserübung, the invasion of Norway. He was recognized with the Knight's Cross of the Iron Cross on 9 May 1940. Beginning in summer 1940, Saalwächter led German surface operations in the North Atlantic and the English Channel. In 1940, he directed E-Boat forces against British shipping during the Kanalkampf phase of the Battle of Britain in support of the Luftwaffe. Later, he oversaw naval movements such as Operation Cerberus in February 1942. On 20 September of that year, he was replaced as head of Navy Group West by Marschall, who was himself replaced by Theodor Krancke in April 1944. Saalwächter resigned from active service on 30 November 1942.

Saalwächter was imprisoned by the Soviet Union on 21 June 1945. He was convicted by a Soviet military tribunal of war crimes on 17 October and executed by firing squad in Moscow on 6 December. In 1994, after the dissolution of the Soviet Union, Saalwächter was formally exonerated by a Russian court.

== Awards and decorations ==
- Iron Cross (1914) 2nd and 1st class
- House Order of Hohenzollern, Knight's Cross with swords
- Hanseatic Cross of Hamburg
- Honour Cross of the World War 1914/1918
- Clasp to the Iron Cross (1939) 2nd and 1st class
- Knight's Cross of the Iron Cross on 9 May 1940 as General Admiral and Marine-Gruppenbefehlshaber Marinegruppe West (Note: According to Scherzer as commander of Marinegruppenkommando West.)
- German Cross in Gold on 14 December 1942 as General Admiral in Marinegruppenkommando West

== Notes ==
Military offices
Preceded by none	Commander-in-Chief of the Kriegsmarine Group Command West; August 1939 – November 1942	Succeeded by Admiral Wilhelm Marschall
