= Wilhelm Marschall =

German admiral

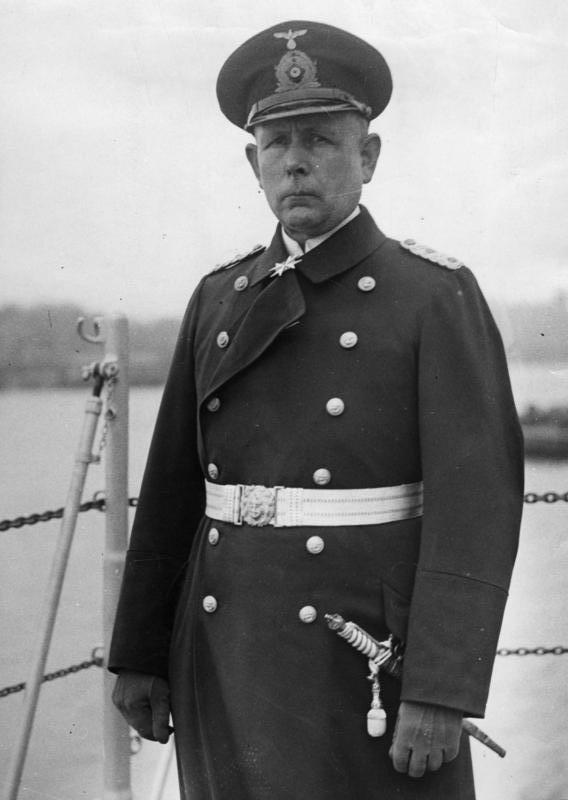
- Born: 30 September 1886; Augsburg, Bavaria, German Empire.
- Died: 20 March 1976 (aged 89); Mölln, West Germany.
- Military career
- Allegiance: German Empire; Weimar Republic; Nazi Germany
- Branch: Imperial German Navy; Reichsmarine; Kriegsmarine
- Service years: 1906–45
- Rank: Generaladmiral
- Commands: SM UC-74; SM UB-105; Hessen; Admiral Scheer; Operations Division, OKM; Flottenchef; Marinegruppenkommando West
- Conflicts: World War I Spanish Civil War; World War II
- Awards: Pour le Mérite; German Cross in Gold

Wilhelm Marschall (30 September 1886 – 20 March 1976) was a German admiral during World War II. He was also a recipient of the Pour le Mérite which he received as commander of the U-boat UB-105 during World War I. The Pour le Mérite was the Kingdom of Prussia's highest military order for German officers until the end of World War I.

== Biography ==
Marschall was born in Augsburg, Kingdom of Bavaria, in 1886.

In 1906, he entered the Kaiserliche Marine as a Seekadett. During World War I he served as a watch officer on Kronprinz. In 1916, he was trained as a U-boat commander and captained both UC-74 and UB-105 by war's end. He sank 41 merchant ships and two troopships, for a total of 119,170 GRT, and was awarded the Pour la Mérite, Germany's highest military honour.

While in the Reichsmarine, Marschall served primarily as a Vermessungsoffizier (surveying officer), commanding the survey ship Panther from 1924 to 1926, and in different staff positions. At the end of 1934 he became commander of the pocket battleship Admiral Scheer. As a Konteradmiral in 1936, he joined the Naval High Command and headed the operations division. During the Spanish Civil War Marschall commanded the German naval forces off of the Spanish coast. He was promoted to Admiral and Flottenchef (fleet commander) in 1939.

Admiral Marschall, flying his flag in battleship Gneisenau, led the German naval force which intercepted and sank the British auxiliary cruiser Rawalpindi on 23 November 1939, while on patrol off Faroe Islands.

On 8 June 1940, during the latter part of the Norwegian Campaign, Marschall and part of his force (flagship Gneisenau, and her sister-ship Scharnhorst) fell in with British aircraft carrier Glorious and two destroyers (Acasta and Ardent) about 280 miles west of Harstad, Norway. In a two-hour action, Glorious and her accompanying destroyers were all sunk, in exchange for damage to Scharnhorst (struck by one of Acasta's torpedoes, and one shell from each of the destroyers).

Although the battle resulted in a German victory, Marschall had engaged Glorious despite orders to avoid action. Marschall's differences with the High Command on this subject, and the severe damage to Scharnhorst during the engagement, ensured that Marschall was replaced as Flottenchef by Admiral Günther Lütjens. Marschall led the inspection of naval education for two years beginning in the summer 1940.

In 1942, Marschall was named commanding admiral of occupied France and replaced Alfred Saalwächter as commander of Marinegruppenkommando West. On 1 February 1943 he was promoted to Generaladmiral, but was replaced as western commander by Theodor Krancke and deactivated later that spring. During the remainder of the war, Marschall was reactivated twice, once as Sonderbevollmächtigter (special agent) for the Danube, and once as commander of the Marineoberkommando West shortly before the end of the war. He was held as a prisoner of war from 1945 to 1947.

Marschall died in Mölln, West Germany, in 1976.

== Awards ==
- Pour le Mérite (4 July 1918)
- Clasp to the Iron Cross 2nd and 1st Class
- Iron Cross 2nd and 1st Class
- German Cross in Gold (23 March 1942)

Military offices
Preceded by Admiral Otto Schultze	Commanding Admiral France; 9 August 1942 – November 1942	Succeeded by —
Preceded by Generaladmiral Alfred Saalwächter	Commander-in-Chief of the Kriegsmarine Group Command West; 21 September 1942 – 19 April 1943	Succeeded by Admiral Theodor Krancke
Preceded by Admiral Hermann Boehm	Chief of Fleet of the Kriegsmarine; 21 October 1939 – 7 July 1940	Succeeded by Admiral Günther Lütjens
