= Conrad Albrecht =

German admiral (1880–1969)

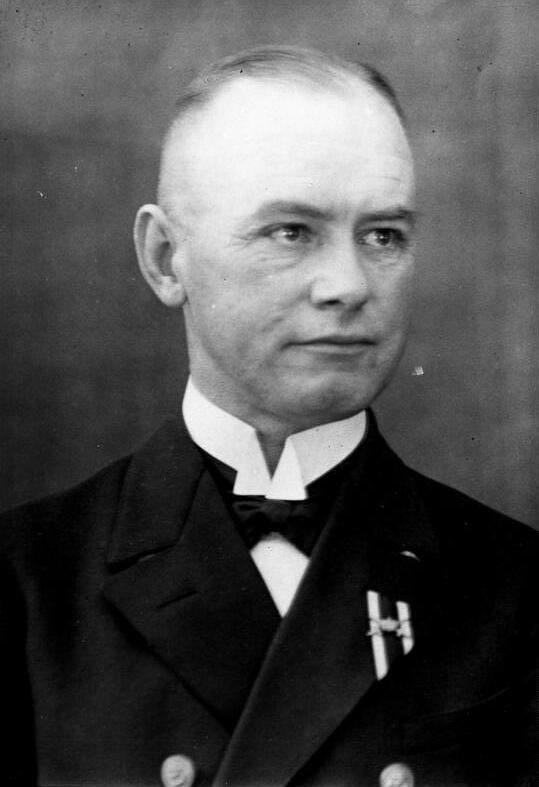
- Born: 7 October 1880; Bremen
- Died: 18 August 1969 (aged 88); Hamburg
- Military career
- Allegiance: German Empire; Weimar Republic; Nazi Germany
- Branch: Imperial German Navy; Reichsmarine; Kriegsmarine
- Service years: 1899–1939
- Rank: Generaladmiral
- Commands: Naval-Group-Commander East
- Conflicts: World War I World War II
- Awards: Order of the Red Eagle

Conrad Albrecht (7 October 1880 in Bremen – 18 August 1969 in Hamburg) was a German admiral during World War II.

== Early military career ==
Albrecht entered the Kaiserliche Marine (Imperial German Navy) on 10 April 1899 as a sea cadet. He made his basic training on the SMS Stosch. In March 1909 he was promoted to Kapitänleutnant. With the outbreak of World War I he became commander of a torpedo boat flotilla in Flanders. In October 1916 he was raised to Korvettenkapitän. In January 1917 he became commander of Zerstörer-Flotille Flandern, remaining in that position till 31 October 1918.

== After World War I ==
Albrecht served in the staff of the Marinestation der Ostsee (Marine Station of the Baltic Sea) until 12 March 1920. Afterwards till September 1920 he took command of I. Baltic Sea Minesweeper-Flotilla and then, till 27 March 1923, of the I. Flottille. He was promoted to Fregattenkapitän on 28 March 1923 and became commander of Naval Arsenal Kiel. On 1 May 1925 he was promoted to Kapitän zur See and was assigned to Marine Station of the Baltic Sea as chief of staff. In December 1928 he became commander of the Marineoffizierspersonalabteilung (Marine officer staff administration) of the Marine Headquarter. He was elevated to Konteradmiral on 1 April 1930 and on 29 September Albrecht was named commander of the Naval Reconnaissance Force.

On 1 October 1932 he was promoted to Vizeadmiral and appointed commanding officer of Marine Station of the Baltic sea. On duty on the post till 4 July 1935; on 1 December 1935 Albrecht was made Admiral and became the commander of the Baltic Sea area command. In 1939 he was promoted to General admiral; one of just twelve. He led the Kriegsmarine operations during the Invasion of Poland. He went into retirement on 31 December 1939.

== Decorations & Awards ==
- Order of St. Olav, Knight's Cross First Class
- Order of the Redeemer, Knight of the Golden Cross
- Order of the Crown of Italy, Officer Class
- Order of the Red Eagle, 4th Class
- Iron Cross (1914), 2nd and 1st Class
- House Order of Hohenzollern, Knight's Cross with Swords
- Prussian Service Award Cross
- Friedrich-August Cross, 2nd and 1st Class
- Hanseatic Cross of Bremen
