= Otto Schniewind =

German admiral (1887–1964)

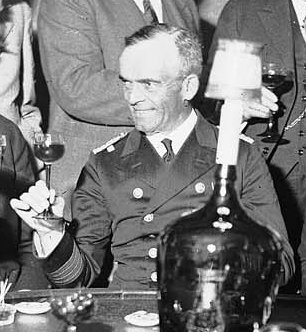
- Schniewind in 1933
- Born: 14 December 1887; Saarlouis
- Died: 26 March 1964 (aged 76); Linz am Rhein
- Military career
- Allegiance: German Empire (to 1918); Weimar Republic (to 1933); Nazi Germany
- Branch: Imperial German Navy; Reichsmarine; Kriegsmarine
- Service years: 1907–45
- Rank: Generaladmiral
- Units: SMS Leipzig; SMS Augsburg; SMS Magdeburg
- Commands: cruiser Köln
- Conflicts: World War I World War II: Operation Rösselsprung
- Awards: Knight's Cross of the Iron Cross

Otto Schniewind (14 December 1887 – 26 March 1964) was a German General Admiral during World War II. He was a recipient of the Knight's Cross of the Iron Cross of Nazi Germany.

== Career ==
Schniewind entered the Kaiserliche Marine in 1907 as a cadet. During the First World War he served as a commander of torpedoboats. When the German fleet surrendered to the British he commanded a squadron of torpedo boats, with this he partook in the Scuttling of the German fleet at Scapa Flow, after which he was taken prisoner by the British.

After being released Schniewind continued to serve in the Marinebrigade Ehrhardt and later the Reichsmarine. From 1925 to 1926 he served as adjutant to the Minister of War Otto Gessler. In 1932 Schniewind became captain of the light cruiser Köln. In 1934 Schniewind was appointed to another staff function. He was promoted to Konteradmiral (rear admiral) in 1937 and to Vizeadmiral (vice admiral) in 1940.

He served as Chief of Staff of the Seekriegsleitung from 1938 to 1941. After the sinking of the Bismarck Schniewind was appointed as successor to Günther Lütjens as the fleet commander of the Kriegsmarine after Lütjens was lost with his ship. In 1943, his position was renamed Marinegruppenkommando Nord und Flottenchef. On 1 March 1944 Schniewind was promoted to Generaladmiral. On 30 July 1944, Schniewind was relieved of command and for the duration of the war he saw no further employment.

After the War he was arrested and prosecuted during the High Command Trial for his role in the invasion of Norway (Operation Weserübung) but he was acquitted, after which he was released from captivity. From 1949 to 1952 he served with the Naval Historical Team in Bremerhaven.

== Awards ==
- Iron Cross (1914) 1st Class (5 January 1918)
- Order of the Sword, Commander 2nd Class (Sweden) (30 June 1936)
- Wehrmacht Long Service Award 4th to 1st Class (2 October 1936)
- Order of St. Sava 2nd Class (1 June 1939) (Yugoslavia)
- Order of the Crown of Italy, Grand Officer (23 September 1939)
- Order of Naval Merit (Spain) in White (21 August 1939)
- Clasp to the Iron Cross (1939) 2nd and 1st Class
- Knight's Cross of the Iron Cross on 20 April 1940 as Vizeadmiral and chief of staff of the Seekriegsleitung in the OKM
- Order of the Sacred Treasure 1st Class (Japan)

Military offices
Preceded by none	Chief of Staff of the Seekriegsleitung; October 1938 – 10 June 1941	Succeeded by Admiral Kurt Fricke
Preceded by Admiral Günther Lütjens	Fleet commander of the Kriegsmarine; June 1941 – July 1944	Succeeded by Admiral Wilhelm Meendsen-Bohlken
