= Marinestation der Nordsee =

Command Authority of the German Navy

The Marinestation der Nordsee (North Sea Naval Station) of the German Kaiserliche Marine (Imperial Navy) at Wilhelmshaven came out of the efforts of the navy of the North German Confederation. The land was obtained for the Confederation from the Grand Duchy of Oldenburg by Prince Adalbert of Prussia through the Jade Treaty of 1853. The naval station was established on 19 May 1870, and became the ‘Imperial’ station with the proclamation of the German Empire in 1871.

There was also a Marinestation der Ostsee in Kiel and five less formally established foreign stations.

Naval stations were the highest land based commands of Imperial German naval authority. The Chief of the Naval Station was usually an admiral who commanded the military police in the port area and the fortifications of the port. He oversaw the operation of sailors and shipyard divisions, and the ship reserve divisions. In addition he had command of all warships in his zone that did not have permanent commanders, such as test commands. Administrative sections of the two naval stations were Garrison Station services and funds, building authorities, offices clothing, food, offices and laundries.
