= Organization of the Kriegsmarine =

Kriegsmarine organizational chart

The organization of the Kriegsmarine refers to the operational and administrative structure of the German Navy from 1935 to 1945. Many of the organizational tenets of the Kriegsmarine were inherited from its predecessor the Reichsmarine. As World War II unfolded, the Kriegsmarine expanded to cover additional regions and responsibilities, most significant of which was the occupation of France and the Battle of the Atlantic.

== Navy High Command ==
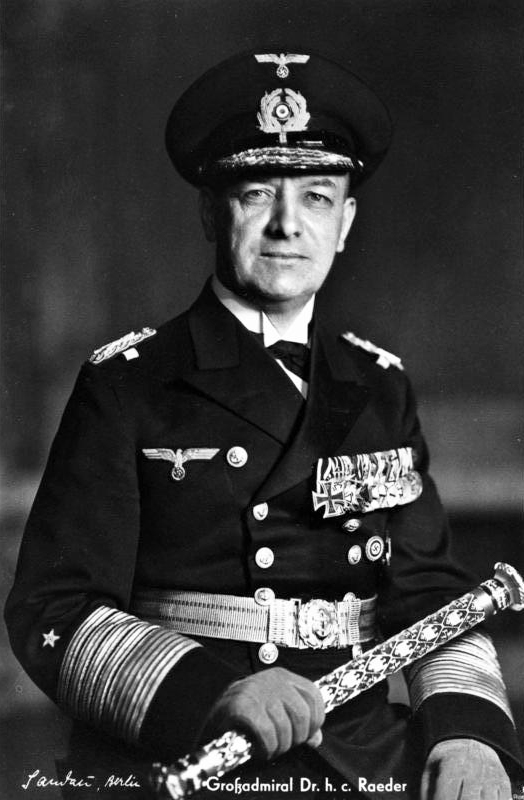
Erich Raeder was the longest serving commander of the Kriegsmarine, holding the post for nearly eight years, before resigning due to disagreements of naval policy with Adolf Hitler.

The ultimate command authority for the Kriegsmarine was the Oberkommando der Marine (OKM), which was headed by the Commander-in-Chief of the Germany Navy (Oberbefehlshaber der Kriegsmarine). OKM in turn answered to the Oberkommando der Wehrmacht ("high command of the armed forces"); naval affairs were often run independently from the wishes of the Army which was under the authority of the Oberkommando des Heeres. The Navy and the Luftwaffe (air force) further had little coordination, leading to serious delays in the development of naval aviation.

The following personnel served as commander-in-chief of the German Navy from the inception of the Kriegsmarine in 1935 until the downfall of Nazi Germany ten years later.

- Erich Raeder: 1935–1943 (also had served as Reichsmarine C-in-C, resigned after Hitler criticised his leadership and ordered scrapping of capital ships)
- Karl Dönitz: 1943–1945 (previously had served as Commander of Submarines, was made Reichs President with death of Hitler)
- Hans-Georg von Friedeburg: May 1945 (served for 22 days until suicide while prisoner of war)
- Walter Warzecha: May – June 1945 (served for one month under the Allies supervising the dissolution of the Kriegsmarine and post disbanded)

Internal to the OKM were several additional offices, the most important of which was the Seekriegsleitung (SKL), which coordinated naval warfare and operational plans. Offices also existed for naval construction, weapons, as well as general office for naval affairs (Allgemeines Marineamt). A supply and logistics office, known as the Marinekommandoamt, was in charge of all quartermaster needs.

The Kriegsmarine did not maintain an independent naval intelligence branch, but instead relied upon the Abwehr, which coordinated intelligence for all branches of the German military. Admiral Wilhelm Canaris was Chief of the Abwehr for most of its existence until he was replaced just prior to the 20 July plot against Hitler. Thereafter the Abwehr was folded into the Nazi party intelligence service, the Sicherheitsdienst, and was run by the SS under Walter Schellenberg.

=== Fleet commander ===
The fleet commander of the Kriegsmarine, who was a member of the Navy High Command, was the highest administrative officer to which the vessel type commanders answered. The position did not actually command an at-sea fleet, but was more comparable to a modern-day Chief of Naval Operations or Inspector of the Navy.

== Navy Type Commands ==
Navy type commanders were permanently assigned administrative officers which oversaw the development, deployment, and in some cases operational activities of the various classes of German naval vessels. Due to cross jurisdiction with the Navy group commanders, who tactically commanded all vessels at sea, some type commanders were little more than ceremonial officers who held a title with little authority. Others, such as Karl Dönitz who commanded the German U-boat force, exercised near total independence and held enormous authority, both operationally and administrative.

== Navy Group Commands ==
The Navy Group Commands were the highest operational authority of the Kriegsmarine and held direct tactical control of all naval vessels and personnel in their region of responsibility. In contrast to other navies, the Kriegsmarine did not use numbered fleets, but instead used geographical regions to determine operational control. Thus, vessels were not permanently assigned to a group, but were administratively commanded by a type commander and then operationally deployed into a particular Navy Group commander's area.

The original Navy group commands were formed from the existing Baltic and North Sea Fleets, part of the Reichsmarine. Navy Group Command "West" was formed at Wilhelmshaven while "Ost" was based in Kiel. Both commands were activated in November 1938 with Admiral Conrad Albrecht commanding Group East while Alfred Saalwächter commanded in the west. Command of Group East was assumed by Admiral Rolf Carls in October 1939 and he held the command until August 1940 when Group East was disbanded and merged with the new Navy Group North. Admiral Saalwächter continued as commander of Navy Group West until after the invasion of France when the position was assumed by Admiral Wilhelm Marschall who had previously served as the Navy Region Commander for Northern France. Marschall served as Commander Navy Group West during the opening years of the Battle of the Atlantic; he was later succeeded in April 1943 by Admiral Theodor Krancke who held the position until the German withdrawal from France and the disbandment of Navy Group West in October 1944.

Navy Group North became a highly significant command following the invasion of Norway. In March 1943, command was assumed by Otto Schniewind who also held dual assignment as the Kriegsmarine fleet commander. Schniewind's title was Marinegruppenkommando Nord und Flottenchef which he held until his command was disbanded in July 1944. Thereafter, naval operations in the North Sea were controlled directly by the OKM.

Naval operation command of the Mediterranean Sea was established in February 1941 through a command known as "Admiral Z" and headed by Vizeadmiral Lothar von Arnauld de la Perière. However, Arnauld de la Perière was killed in a plane crash shortly after assuming this post with command then transferred to Admiral Karlgeorg Schuster. In April 1941, Schuster's command was renamed as "Admiral Südost". In July of that year, the Italian-Mediterranean Area was elevated to the status of a Navy Group and became known as Marinegruppenkommando Süd. Sub-commands to the Navy Group South also existed for naval forces operating off of the coasts of Tunisia and North Africa.

Wilhelm Marschall served as Commander Navy Group South from December 1941 to March 1943. He was then replaced by Admiral Kurt Fricke who held the position until the end of the war.

=== Tactical operations ===
During tactical operations, the Navy group commanders served in the same capacity as an operational fleet commander. Units under their command were organized into naval task forces, groups, as well as independently assigned units. The commanders of the task forces and groups were temporarily assigned, most often from the ranks of the naval type and flotilla commanders. One of the largest naval operations of the Kriegsmarine, the invasion of Norway, saw a naval order of battle consisting of a battleship force, six warship groups, as well as numerous other combat and support craft grouped into "objective groups" as well as temporary at-sea flotillas.

Naval transport craft, considered an integral part of amphibious operations, were grouped into six primary Transportflottillen which were deployed as needed to support naval operations under the authority of a Navy group commander. Four additional transport flotillas, based in specific geographical regions, were located in Danzig, the Netherlands, Niederrhein and along the Ruhr river. The Kriegsmarine also maintained a smaller transport company in the Netherlands, known as the "Fährflottille Waal". Smaller landing craft were grouped into one of several landing craft flotillas.

=== Special operations ===
Navy special operations, which included the operation of midget submarines and Navy frogman units, were grouped under a single command known as the Kommando der Kleinkampfverbände. The command was established in April 1944, under Vizeadmiral Hellmuth Heye; Heye would hold the position until the end of World War II. Special operations were originally grouped into five command regions: West, South, Holland, Norway, and a special region known as Skagerak, zugleich z.b.V.. In the spring of 1945, the regions were reconsolidated into the following six special operation divisions:

- 1st K-Division (Narvik)
- 2nd K-Division (Trondheim)
- 3rd K-Division (Bergen)
- 4th K-Division (the Netherlands)
- 5th K-Division (also in the Netherlands)
- 6th K-Division (the Mediterranean Sea)

Dispersed through the various special operations divisions were a total of eight Lehrkommando, numbering from 200 through 800. The smallest special operation units, known as K-Flottille oversaw direct operations of the small battle units and submarines, and were numbered according to their parent Lehrkommano (i.e. K-Flottille 215, K-Flottille 416, etc.). K-Flottille 311 was specifically designated to oversee deployment of the Hecht miniature submarine while the Seehund submarines were dispersed between K-Flottille 312, 313, and 314.

== Navy Regional Commands ==
Kriegsmarine naval shore organization

Naval regional commands were the senior most shore authority for the Kriegsmarine during the Second World War. There were four naval regions established from 1938 to 1942 (North Sea, Baltic Sea, South, and Norway). Regional commanders oversaw a large staff consisting of naval inspectors, administrative offices, permanently assigned naval shore units, and also served as the senior commander for any naval prisoner-of-war camps as well as the reporting senior for the naval arsenals. A deputy position, known as the "2.Admiral", served as head of regional administration and as the senior officer for all transient personnel.

=== Naval Districts ===
Naval districts were the immediate operational command for most shore units and were usually commanded by a rear or vice admiral. In the early years of World War II, in particular following the invasion of France, naval districts held relatively the same authority as a Navy region; by 1943, the naval districts had been downsized, with the larger districts broken apart into several smaller commands. There were approximately twenty naval districts in existence from 1941 to 1945. A special district, known as "District Southeast", dealt specifically with inland waterways and was based at Traunstein.

In some of the more important naval districts, there were further lower administrative commands known as Marine-Abschnitts (Naval areas). In France, this areas were known as Kriegsmarinedienststellen. Another type of local command was the sea defense zone (Seeverteidigung), which was a tactical operational area intended to defend the German coast line against actual attack by enemy forces.

=== Navy Ports ===
The German Navy divided ports into two separate categories with larger ports commanded by a Hafenkommandanten (Port Commander) while the remainder of ports were overseen by a Port Captain (Hafenkapitäne). Ports in the same geographical area were grouped together into administrative areas known as Hafenkommandanten im Bereich. Larger ports were commanded by officers ranked Korvettenkapitän or Kapitän zur See, while smaller ports were typically commanded by a Fregattenkapitän.

Naval ports were led by a command staff with lower departments covering maintenance, medical care, supply, as well as personnel administration. Personnel permanently assigned to the port were part of the port's naval garrison, while those assigned to ships and submarines answered to their own commanders. For crews who berthed in shore facilities, instead of on board ship (especially in the case of in-port submarines), these personnel were administratively reportable to the port authorities.

Port security was divided into shore security, harbor security, and land defense. Every port maintained its own small security force as part of the Marine-Küstenpolizei (Naval Coastal Police) which was augmented by a larger unit known as the Landesschützen-Kompanie which also included naval reservists. Harbor security was maintained by a completely separate command chain and did not operationally involve the port commander. The port commander further did not command the naval land defense units, such as flak batteries and naval coastal artillery, which also answered to their own chains of command.

Most German ports also maintained a large contingent of civilian dock workers and frequently employed senior civilian engineers to oversee shipbuilding and repair. In France, the French resistance made extensive use of dock workers to gather intelligence about German naval activity, in particular the comings and goings of German U-boats from port. Sabotage was also a constant problem for the Germans in occupied ports, leading to the creation of a special SS unit, the SS-Hafensicherungstruppen, which consisted of Allgemeine-SS reservists who performed port security and night watch duties.

=== Harbor Security Commands ===
Waterborne security within German harbors was maintained by a separate chain of command from the traditional shore establishment, and in many cases even bypassed the administrative command of the German ports themselves. The security of all harbors in Nazi occupied Europe was under the authority of three senior geographical regions led by a Befehlshaber der Sicherung (Commander of Security). These commands controlled all harbor patrol vessels, such as minesweepers, minelayers, submarine net ships, and coastal patrol boats.

== Ground and staff forces ==
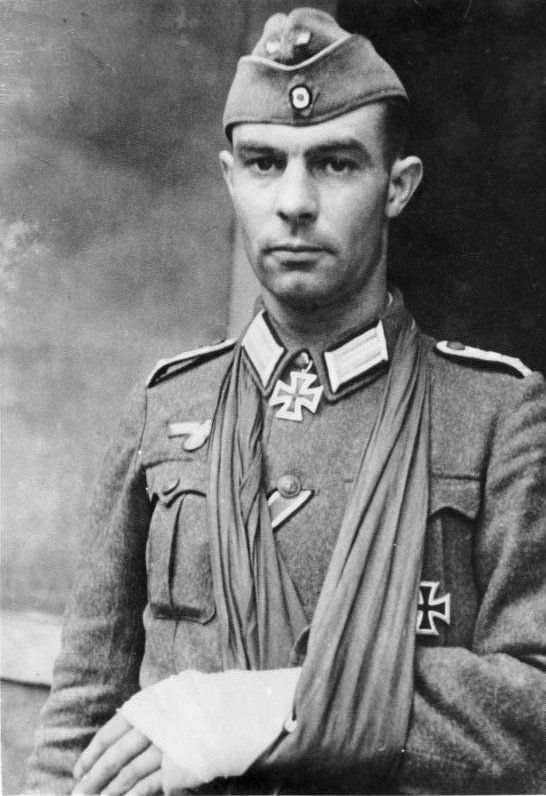
A coastal artillery officer wearing the Navy's shore personnel uniform

Kriegsmarine ground personnel were permanently based at shore assignments, usually due to the nature of their career field. Staff and support personnel typically rotated between shore and sea duty, depending upon the nature of their assignment.

=== Naval Infantry ===
The Kriegsmarine maintained a large ground force, organized along the same lines as the German Army, which was known as the Marine-Infanterie. There were five active Marine-Infanterie-Divisionen as well as two independent Marine Infantry Brigades. Internally, each division and brigade contained a number of regiments which were divided into the following classes:

- Marinestosstruppkompanie (Marine Attack Troop Company)
- Marine-Infanterie-Regimenter (Naval Infantry Regiment)
- Marine-Schützen-Regimenter (Naval Rifle Regiment)
- Marine-Grenadier-Regimenter (Naval Grenadier Regiment)
- Marine-Ersatz-Regiment (Naval Replacement Regiment)

Within each regiment were subordinate Marine-Bataillone. The Kriegsmarine also maintained two Divisionskampfgruppen (Divisional Combat Groups) which were composed of three rifle and two replacement regiments.

=== Naval artillery and anti-aircraft ===
Kriegsmarine naval artillery and anti-aircraft crews were considered as shore personnel and assigned to either the Marine-Artillerie-Einheiten (for naval artillery) or Marine-Flak-Einheiten (naval anti-aircraft). Artillery units were organized into either regiments or sections while flak units were maintained in brigades and regiments. Both types of units were assigned to various ports and harbors and thus were under the direct operational authority of both the port commanders as well as the commander harbor security forces. During actual invasion of coastal regions by enemy forces, these units became part of the sea defense zones.

=== Staff and support units ===
The Kriegsmarine maintained several dedicated staff units which were maintained as independent units normally attached to a Navy shore command. Members of the staff corps could also be interspersed into regular Navy units, such as ships and shore bases, to serve as part of the regular complement. The following were the four primary staff and support units:

- Marine-Pionier-Einheiten (Naval engineers)
- Marine-Nachrichten (Naval signal units)
- Marine-Kraftfahr-Kompanie (Naval transport companies)
- Sanitätseinheiten (Medical units)

== Independent operations ==
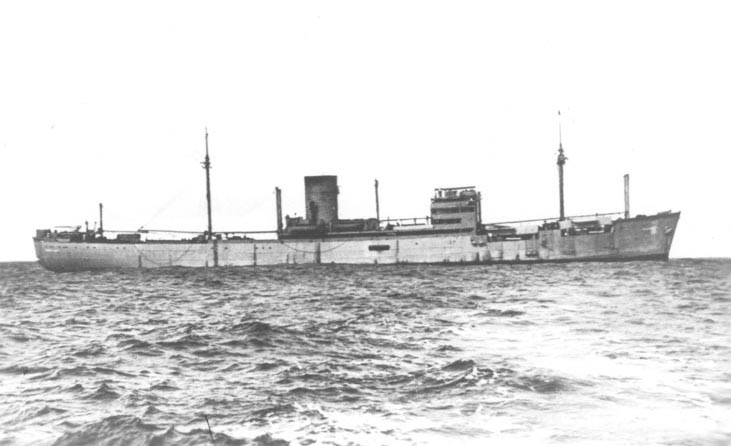
Commerce raiders, like the auxiliary cruiser Atlantis seen here, often operated independently

German commerce raiders were nominally independent, reporting to the Seekriegsleitung for administrative purposes.

German vessels operating off of South America, such as Admiral Graf Spee, were also considered on "extended detached duty" and reported directly to OKM. German naval forces operating off of Spain and Portugal were also not under a naval group and typically answered to their type commander German hospital ships (Lazarettschiffe) were under the authority of the Reich Commission for Ocean Navigation which was a civilian agency outside the authority of the regular Navy.

The officers and crew of Graf Zeppelin existed in a unique state, since the vessel was not commissioned and those on board were mainly involved in construction as well as upkeep. The direct authority for this "housekeeping crew" was vague and those assigned to Graf Zeppelin appeared to have rotated between various higher commands depending upon the location and status of the aircraft carrier
