= Ministry of National Defence (East Germany) =

Chief administrative arm of the East German National People's Army

- Ministerium für Nationale Verteidigung
- Flag of the Ministry of National Defence

Agency overview
- Formed: 1 March 1956
- Dissolved: 23 April 1990
- Jurisdiction: (East Germany) National People's Army
- Headquarters: Strausberg

The Ministry of National Defense (German: Ministerium für Nationale Verteidigung – MfNV) was the chief administrative arm of the East German National People's Army. The MND was modeled on the Ministry of Defense of the Soviet Union. The headquarters of the Ministry was in Strausberg near East Berlin. The Guard Regiment Hugo Eberlein provided security and guard services to the Ministry. The Ministry also had its own publishing house, Military publishing house of the German Democratic Republic.

== Minister of Defence ==
Minister of National Defence
- Minister für Nationale Verteidigung (German)
- Flag of minister of national defence (?–1990)

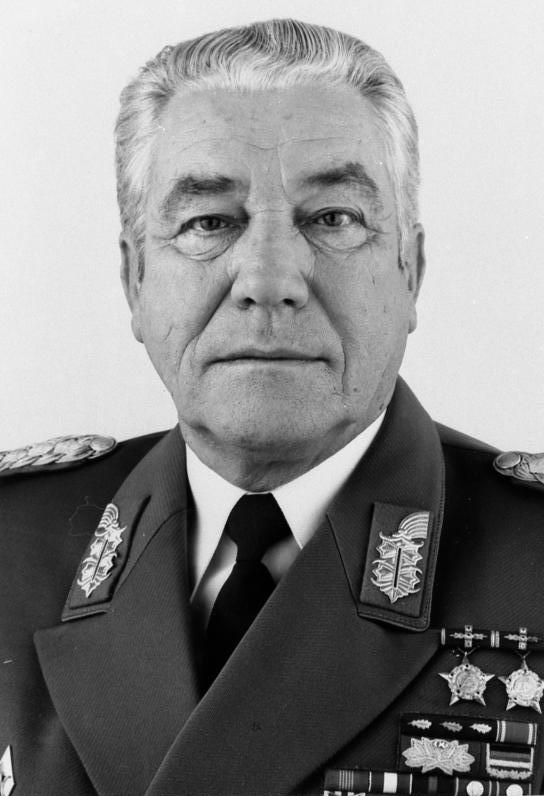
- Longest serving Heinz Hoffmann; 14 July 1960 – 2 December 1985
- Ministry of National Defence
- Reports to: Chairmen
- Precursor: Chief of the Barracked People's Police
- Formation: 1 March 1956; 70 years ago
- First holder: Willi Stoph
- Final holder: Rainer Eppelmann
- Abolished: 2 October 1990; 36 years ago
- Deputy: Deputy minister of national defence

The NVA was administered through the Ministry of National Defense, one of the principal branches of the national government. The ministers of National Defense were:

No.	Portrait	Name (Birth–Death)	Term of office			Political party	Council of Ministers	Ref.
No.	Portrait	Name (Birth–Death)	Took office	Left office	Time in office	Political party	Council of Ministers	Ref.
Minister of National Defence
1		Armeegeneral; Willi Stoph (1914–1999)	1 March 1956	14 July 1960	4 years, 135 days	Socialist Unity Party	2nd–3rd	
2		Armeegeneral; Heinz Hoffmann (1910–1985)	14 July 1960	2 December 1985 #	25 years, 141 days	Socialist Unity Party	3rd–4th–5th–6th–7th–8th	
3		Armeegeneral; Heinz Keßler (1920–2017)	3 December 1985	18 November 1989	3 years, 351 days	Socialist Unity Party	8th–9th	
4		Admiral; Theodor Hoffmann (1935–2018)	18 November 1989	12 April 1990	145 days	Socialist Unity Party	Modrow	
Minister of Disarmament and Defence
5		Rainer Eppelmann (born 1943)	12 April 1990	2 October 1990	173 days	Democratic Awakening	de Maizière	

== Hierarchy ==
The Minister of National Defence was assisted by a colloquium of deputy ministers who were also chiefs of certain key administrations within the ministry.

In 1987 the deputy ministers and their assignments were as follows:

- Chief of the Border Troops of the German Democratic Republic;

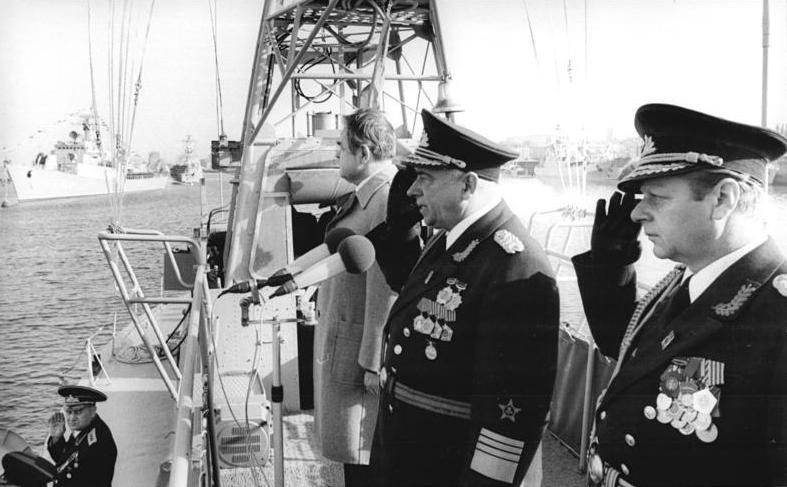
Wilhelm Ehm, middle, at a Fleet parade for the 30th Anniversary of the German Democratic Republic in 1979.

- Chief of the Volksmarine (People's Navy);
- Chief of Technology and Weaponry;
- Chief of the Main Political Administration (Heinz Keßler's former post);
- Chief of the Air Forces of the National People's Army
- Chief of the Land Forces of the National People's Army; The Land Forces Command, located at Geltow was established on 1 December 1972 as a management body for the land forces.
- Chief of the Main Staff and secretary of the National Defense Council;
- Chief of civil defense; and
- Chief of rear services.

== History ==
On 18 January 1956 the People's Chamber (the national legislature) passed a bill creating the NVA and the Ministry of Defense from the Chief Administration of Training of the Ministry of the Interior. This act formally acknowledged the existence of East Germany's armed forces. The NVA incorporated the Kasernierte Volkspolizei or KVP, Sea Police, and Air Police into a single armed force having three branches: ground, naval, and air. The Ministry of Defense was headed by Colonel General (Generaloberst) Willi Stoph, who was also minister of the interior. In 1987 Stoph was chairman of the Council of Ministers and a member of the SED Politburo. General Hoffmann, who was listed as first deputy minister of defense, attended the Soviet General Staff Academy in the mid-1950s and replaced Stoph as defense minister in 1960. Hoffmann held the post until his death in 1985. Concurrent with the establishment of the NVA as a legal entity was a return to public manifestations of German military traditions, with the addition of socialist elements. The training regimen for recruits approximated that of the former Wehrmacht, as did drill and ceremonies. New uniforms, whose cut but not colour (stone grey) were far closer to those of German World War II forces than to Soviet models, were introduced. Only the helmet represented a radical departure from World War II, but here too the design differed from the Soviet model.

The creation of the NVA addressed both internal and external security problems. Internally the physical appearance of the NVA spoke to the population in terms of their traditional German heritage and differentiated the NVA from the Soviet Army. In theory at least, East German citizens could have pride in their own army. The swift creation of the NVA as a force of more than 120,000 officers and other ranks practicing Prussian-style drill was a dramatic gesture of nationalism that was impossible for the world to ignore.

The creation of the Ministry of Defense and the NVA seemingly should have been a blow to the authority and prestige of the Ministry of the Interior. The bureaucratic impact of this action was mitigated by permitting Stoph to carry both portfolios for four years. In addition, police activities, both civil and secret, remained under the Ministry of the Interior, as did the Border Police. The Ministry of the Interior established its own Alert Units for the specific function of internal security. The Alert Units were militarily structured, fully motorized units with modern weapons and equipment. Garrisoned and trained in battalion-size units, they were capable of carrying out police tasks and other security functions. They have been used in major disturbances or in civil disasters affecting public order and safety.

Differentiation between the Ministry of Defense and the Ministry of the Interior was still in progress in the 1960s. On issue in this process was the subordination of the Border Police. On 15 September 1961, by order of the National Defense Council, the entire Border Police was transferred to the NVA and redesignated the Border Troops of the NVA. Various explanations for this shift have been offered by different authorities. The official reason stressed improvement in the level of training through closer relationship with the NVA and provision for reinforcement of the Border Troops with other NVA assets. The actual reason probably had more to do with standardization within the Warsaw Pact since similar reorganizations occurred in roughly the same time period in all the non-Soviet Warsaw Pact armies.

== Organization ==
The organization of the East German Ministry of Defense, which closely follows the pattern of the Soviet Ministry of Defense, comprises several administrations and departments, among which there appeared to be a certain amount of overlapping authority. The chiefs of the major administrations and commands concurrently served as deputies to the defense minister.

In the mid-1980s, its complement of about 4,200 personnel had a military-to-civilian ratio of approximately three to one, in contrast to comparable Western ministries or departments that generally have a much higher proportion of civilian employees.

Approximately 100 Soviet liaison officers also were assigned to the East German ministry.

The Ministry of National Defense had the following subordinate executive bodies:

=== Headquarters ===
The Headquarters (German: Hauptstab), was led by the Chief of Staff (German: Chefs des Hauptstabes).

No.	Portrait	Chief of Staff	Took office	Left office	Time in office
1	Vincenz Müller	Generalleutnant; Vincenz Müller (1894–1961)	1 March 1956	1 March 1958	2 years
2	Heinz Hoffmann	Generalleutnant; Heinz Hoffmann (1910–1985)	1 March 1958	1 July 1960	2 years, 122 days
3	Sigfrid Riedel [de]	Generalmajor; Sigfrid Riedel (1918–2018)	1 July 1960	15 March 1967	6 years, 257 days
4	Heinz Keßler	Generaloberst; Heinz Keßler (1920–2017)	15 March 1967	10 January 1979	11 years, 301 days
5	Fritz Streletz	Generaloberst; Fritz Streletz (1926–2025)	10 January 1979	31 December 1989	10 years, 355 days
6	Manfred Grätz [de]	Generalleutnant; Manfred Grätz (born 1935)	1 January 1990	15 September 1990	257 days
7	Michael Schlothauer [de]	Generalmajor; Michael Schlothauer (1943–2022)	15 September 1990	2 October 1990	17 days

=== Land Forces Command ===
The Land Forces Command (German: Kommando Landstreitkräfte) was established on 1 December 1972 as a management body created for the land forces. The seat was in Wildpark-West. The Friedrich Engels Guard Regiment provide security and guard services for the Land Forces Command headquarters.

No.	Portrait	Name	Took office	Left office	Time in office
1	Horst Stechbarth	Generaloberst; Horst Stechbarth (1925–2016)	1 December 1972	31 December 1989	17 years, 30 days
2	Horst Skerra [de]	Generalleutnant; Horst Skerra (1930–2024)	1 January 1990	14 September 1990	256 days
3	Hans-Christian Reiche [de]	Generalmajor; Hans-Christian Reiche (1944–2019)	15 September 1990	2 October 1990	17 days

=== Air Forces / Air Defense Command ===
The Air Force / Air Defense Command (German: Kommando Luftstreitkräfte&Luftverteidigung) (LSK / LV) was created in 1956 for government air force and air defense. A year later, the administrations for the joint command LSK / LV-based Eggersdorf was established. It was led by the Chief of the Air Force Command / Air Defense (German: Chefs des Kommandos Luftstreitkräfte/Luftverteidigung).

No.	Portrait	Name	Took office	Left office	Time in office
1	Heinz-Bernhard Zorn [de]	Generalmajor; Heinz-Bernhard Zorn (1912–1993)	1 March 1956	30 August 1956	182 days
2	Heinz Keßler	Generalmajor; Heinz Keßler (1920–2017)	1 September 1956	14 March 1967	10 years, 194 days
3	Herbert Scheibe	Generalleutnant; Herbert Scheibe (1914–1991)	15 March 1967	14 March 1972	4 years, 365 days
4	Wolfgang Reinhold	Generalmajor; Wolfgang Reinhold (1923–2012)	15 March 1972	30 November 1989	17 years, 260 days
5	Rolf Berger	Generalleutnant; Rolf Berger (1936–2009)	1 December 1989	2 October 1990	306 days

=== People's Navy Command ===
Flag of chief of VM (1957–1973)

Flag of chief of VM (1973–1990)

People's Navy Command (German: Kommando Volksmarine) was based in Rostock-Gehlsdorf emerged from the administration of the naval forces. It was created in spring 1957. Following the award of the title "Volksmarine (People's Navy) on 3 November 1960 and was later renamed the People's Navy Command. It was led by the Chief of the Naval Forces Command/People's Navy (German: Chefs des Kommandos Seestreitkräfte/ Volksmarine).

No.	Portrait	Name	Took office	Left office	Time in office
Commander of naval forces (Kommandeur Seestreitkräfte)
1	Felix Scheffler	Konteradmiral; Felix Scheffler (1915–1986)	1 March 1956	31 December 1956	305 days
2	Waldemar Verner	Vizeadmiral; Waldemar Verner (1914–1982)	1 January 1957	31 July 1959	2 years, 211 days
Chief of the Volksmarine (Chefs des Volksmarine)
3	Wilhelm Ehm	Konteradmiral; Wilhelm Ehm (1918–2009)	1 August 1959	31 July 1961	1 year, 364 days
4	Heinz Neukirchen	Konteradmiral; Heinz Neukirchen (1915–1986)	1 August 1961	24 February 1963	1 year, 207 days
(3)	Wilhelm Ehm	Admiral; Wilhelm Ehm (1918–2009)	25 February 1963	30 November 1987	24 years, 278 days
5	Theodor Hoffmann	Vizeadmiral; Theodor Hoffmann (1935–2018)	1 December 1987	17 November 1989	1 year, 351 days
5	Hendrik Born	Vizeadmiral; Hendrik Born (1944–2021)	11 December 1989	2 October 1990	295 days

=== Command GDR border troops ===
After the subordination of the German Border Police (German: Deutschen Grenzpolizei) under the Ministry of National Defense on 15 September 1961, the units were designated as the NVA (Border Troops of the NVA). Once separated, the border troops of the army units were designated as the Border Troops of the GDR (German: Grenztruppen aus der DDR). The Command GDR border troops (German: Kommando Grenztruppen der DDR) was based in Pätz. It was led by the Chief of the GDR border troops command (German: Chefs des Kommandos Grenztruppen der DDR).

No.	Portrait	Name	Took office	Left office	Time in office
1	Erich Peter	Generaloberst; Erich Peter (1919–1987)	15 September 1961	31 July 1979	17 years, 319 days
2	Klaus-Dieter Baumgarten [de]	Generaloberst; Klaus-Dieter Baumgarten (1931–2008)	1 August 1979	31 December 1989	10 years, 152 days
3	Dieter Teichmann	Generalmajor; Dieter Teichmann	1 January 1990	30 September 1990	272 days

=== Civil Defense Headquarters ===
The Civil Defense Headquarters (German: Hauptverwaltung Zivilverteidigung), was led by the Head of the Civil Defense Headquarters (German: Chef der Hauptverwaltung Zivilverteidigung).

No.	Portrait	Name	Took office	Left office	Time in office
1	Fritz Peter [de]	Generaloberst; Fritz Peter (born 1927)	1 December 1976	30 April 1990	13 years, 150 days

The governing bodies still belonged to the Ministry Headquarters, the political headquarters and the areas of Bereiche Rückwärtige Dienste (Rear services) and Technik und Bewaffnung (equipment and armament).

=== Political Headquarters ===
The Political Headquarters (German: Politische Hauptverwaltung) (PHV), was led by the Chief of the Political Administration (German: Chefs der Politischen Hauptverwaltung). The PHV was effectively a hybrid institution, the Chief answering to the Minister of National Defence as a deputy minister and to the Central Committee of the SED (more specifically its Department for Security Affairs) as First Secretary of the closely related SED party organization in the NVA, which held the rank of a Bezirk party organization. The offices of Chief of the PHV and First Secretary were always held in tandem.

No.	Portrait	Name	Took office	Left office	Time in office
1	Friedrich Dickel	Generalmajor; Friedrich Dickel (1913–1993)	1 March 1956	24 August 1956	176 days
2	Gottfried Grünberg [de]	Oberst; Gottfried Grünberg (1899–1985)	25 August 1956	27 November 1957	1 year, 94 days
3	Rudolf Dölling	Generalmajor; Rudolf Dölling (1902–1975)	28 November 1957	31 July 1959	1 year, 245 days
4	Waldemar Verner	Vizeadmiral; Waldemar Verner (1914–1982)	1 August 1959	31 December 1978	19 years, 152 days
5	Heinz Keßler	Generaloberst; Heinz Keßler (1920–2017)	10 January 1979	2 December 1985	6 years, 326 days
6	Horst Brünner	Generaloberst; Horst Brünner (1929–2008)	10 December 1985	31 December 1989	4 years, 21 days

=== Technology and Armament Department ===
The Technology and Armament Department (German: Bereich Technik und Bewaffnung), was led by the Chief of the range equipment and armament (German: Chefs des Bereiches Technik und Bewaffnung).

No.	Portrait	Name	Took office	Left office	Time in office
1	Erwin Freyer [de]	Oberst; Erwin Freyer (1914–1992)	1 March 1956	1 May 1957	1 year, 61 days
2	Rudolf Menzel [de]	Generalmajor; Rudolf Menzel (1910–1974)	1 May 1957	14 October 1959	2 years, 166 days
3	Friedrich Dickel	Generalmajor; Friedrich Dickel (1913–1993)	15 October 1959	14 November 1963	4 years, 30 days
4	Werner Fleißner [de]	Generalmajor; Werner Fleißner (1922–1985)	1 February 1964	27 December 1985 †	21 years, 329 days
5	Joachim Goldbach [de]	Generaloberst; Joachim Goldbach (1929–2008)	1 February 1986	18 April 1990	4 years, 76 days

=== Rear Area Services ===
The Rear Area Services (German: Bereich Rückwärtige Dienste), was led by the Chiefs of the Rear Area Services (German: Chefs des Bereiches Rückwärtigen Dienste).

No.	Portrait	Name	Took office	Left office	Time in office
1	Walter Allenstein [de]	Generalmajor; Walter Allenstein (1906–1992)	1 March 1956	15 September 1972	16 years, 198 days
2	Helmut Poppe	Generalleutnant; Helmut Poppe (1926–1979)	15 September 1972	26 July 1979 †	6 years, 314 days
3	Joachim Goldbach [de]	Generalleutnant; Joachim Goldbach (1929–2008)	16 October 1979	31 January 1986	6 years, 107 days
4	Manfred Grätz [de]	Generalleutnant; Manfred Grätz (born 1935)	1 February 1986	31 December 1989	3 years, 333 days
5	Hans Hofmann [de]	Vizeadmiral; Hans Hofmann (born 1933)	1 January 1990	18 April 1990	107 days

The heads of the commands and the other governing bodies were usually also titled Deputy Minister of National Defense.

The MfNV has concluded agreements with almost all other ministries of the so-called GDR secret agreements. This agreement marked the prominent position of the NVA. Content of these agreements was the preferred treatment of the army in the food issue, to entering and use of forests and open spaces in the GDR.

== See also ==
- List of German defence ministers
- Guard Regiment Hugo Eberlein provided security at the Ministry of National Defence
- Friedrich Engels Guard Regiment provided security at the Kommando Landstreitkräfte/Land Forces Command
