= Gustav Hesse =

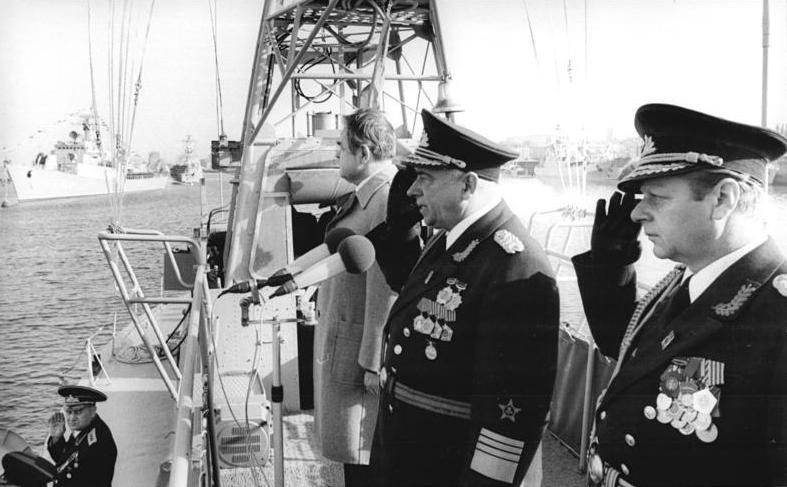
- Rostock, 30th Anniversary of the founding of the German Democratic Republic, Vizeadmiral Gustav Hesse (right) next to Admiral Wilhelm Ehm at the fleet parade
- Born: 27 August 1931; Podmokly (Bodenbach), Czechoslovakia
- Died: 24 October 2001 (aged 70); Hamburg, Germany
- Allegiance: East Germany
- Service / branch: Volksmarine
- Rank: Vizeadmiral (vice admiral)
- Commands: 6th Flotilla, People's Navy (Volksmarine)

Gustav Hesse (27 August 1931 – 24 October 2001) was a former Vizeadmiral (vice admiral) of the East German Navy (Volksmarine) who served as the Chief of Staff and Deputy Chief of the Volksmarine.

== Early life ==
Hesse was the son of a butcher. After an apprenticeship he worked as a baker until 1950.

== Naval career ==
On 15 August 1950, he joined the See Police (Volkspolizei See predecessor to the Volksmarine) as an officer student. He attended the See Police School of the Main Administration Sea Police in Parow, East Germany 1950–1951. Hesse then attended a special course in the Soviet Union 1952–1954. After joining the Socialist Unity Party of Germany in 1953, he was Chief of Staff from 1954 to 1956 of the 2nd Division minelayers and minesweepers of the Sea Police. After a short appointment as the head of the education subdivision at the naval base at Peenemünde, he attended the Soviet Naval War Academy in Leningrad 1956–1960, earning a diploma in military science. After his return East Germany he served as the Deputy Chief and Chief of Staff of the 1st Flotilla from 1960 to 1963. On 1 November 1963 he was appointed commander of the 6th Flotilla on Rügen with the rank fregattenkapitän (commander), in this capacity he was promoted on 1 March 1968 to kapitän zur see (captain) and on the 20th anniversary of the German Democratic Republic was promoted, 7 October 1969, to konteradmiral (commodore). On 1 May 1971, Fregattenkapitän Theodor Hoffmann replaced him as flotilla chief. Konteradmiral Hesse was then appointed as the Deputy Chief of the Volksmarine and Chief of Staff of the Volksmarine. On 7 October 1979, he was promoted to Vizeadmiral (Vice Admiral) on the occasion of the 30th anniversary of the German Democratic Republic. On 1 December 1985, he exchanged positions with Vizeadmiral Theodor Hoffmann as Hoffman's successor as Chief of Education, while Hoffmann became the new Chief of Staff of the People's Navy. Both admirals were at the same time Deputy Chiefs of the People's Navy. Hesse retired from active service on 30 November 1988.

== Medals and decorations ==
- Vaterländischer Verdienstorden in Silber und Bronze
- Kampforden „Für Verdienste um Volk und Vaterland“ in Silber
- Banner der Arbeit
