= Kampfschwimmerkommando 18 =

- Active: April 1, 1957–March 31, 1991
- Country: East Germany
- Allegiance: Workers' and Peasants Government (until 1990)
- Branch: Volksmarine
- Type: Special forces, frogmen
- Role: Special operations Combat diving Special reconnaissance
- Size: 100
- Part of: Combat Swimmer Command 18 (KSK-18)
- Garrison/HQ: Kühlungsborn
- Battle honours: Richard Staimer

Kampfschwimmerkommando 18 (English: Combat Swimmer Command 18), or KSK-18, was a naval special warfare unit in the Volksmarine that specialized in naval-based commando and amphibious operations.

Before the unit was demobilized, it was known to have 100 divers in its ranks.

== History ==
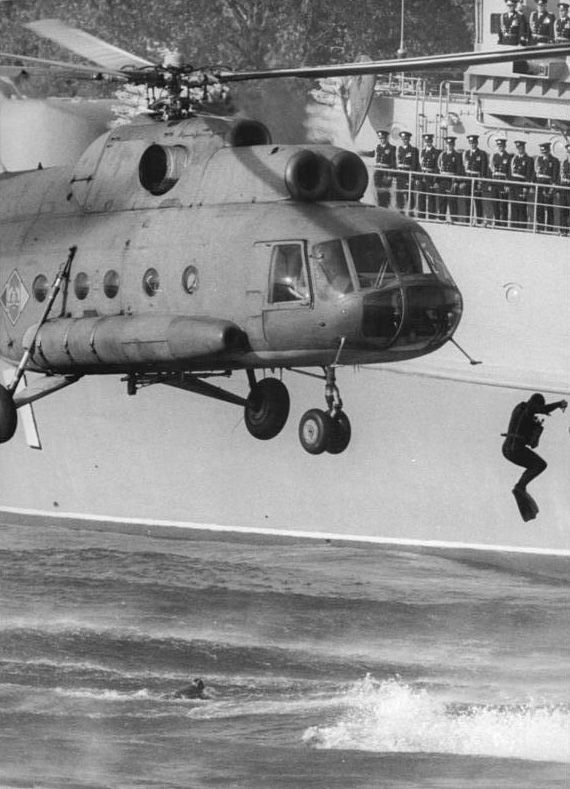
KSK-18 divers practice deploying from a Mil-Mi 8.

From 1956 to early 1957, the Volksmarine had considered the possibility of creating a unit that would operate as a Frogman combat unit. The idea was known to be backed by Vizeadmiral Heinz Neukirchen.

KSK-18 was formed on April 1, 1957, after a group of experienced divers from the Gesellschaft für Sport und Technik demonstrated frogman tactics. Additional recruits were selected from a local boxing club in Rostock.

Among those chosen to serve was Kurt Klingbeil, who also became the unit's first commanding officer and led the unit from Dänholm as the Special Diving Group (SDG). Dänholm was chosen since the Volksmarine's Salvage and Rescue Service was located there. On June 15, 1959, SDF was renamed as the Special Diving Command. The unit was renamed again as the KSK on January 1, 1960.

In November 1961, KSK was transferred to Kühlungsborn.

KSK was placed under the 4th Flotilla on January 1, 1962. Command authority was placed under the People's Navy Command. On December 1, 1971, number 18 was awarded to the unit and was renamed as KSK-18.

By 1980, KSK-18's tasks grew to include mining hostile shipping lanes and disarming of mines in East German territorial waters.

Between July 18 to 20 of 1983, the Kondor-class minesweeper ship Meteor was involved in combat exercises where KSK-18 divers were deployed in Rügen.

In October 1987, on the 38th anniversary of East Germany's founding, KSK-18 was awarded its unit flag by East German Deputy Defense Minister and Volksmarine chief Wilhelm Ehm. The honorary name "Richard Staimer" was awarded to the unit on October 7, 1988.

On September 21, 1990, the KSK-18 was ordered to disarm and demobilize, based on Order 48/90 issued by the Minister for Disarmament and Defense. Full demobilization and decommissioning was done on March 31, 1991, based on orders given by the Bundeswehr's Federal Armed Forces Command East.

After the unit was decommissioned, some officers and enlisted personnel were recruited to the Bundeswehr through probationary means. Among them was Lieutenant Commander Usczeck, who became the commander of Naval Security Battalions 3 and 5. An ex-KSK-18 diver joined an exchange program with the Navy SEALs while others joined German law enforcement agencies.

Former members of the KSK-18 joined an association known as Marinekameradschaft Kampfschwimmer Ost e.V. On September 18, 2016, six of their members swam the Fehmarnbelt between Rödby in Denmark and Puttgarden in Germany within a distance of 25 km.

=== Known Operations ===
During the Six-Day War, it was reported that KSK-18 provided military assistance to the Egyptian Navy that resulted in the capture of six Shayetet 13 operators.

KSK-18 divers were deployed to find Torpedo Boat 844 of the Volksmarine's 6th Flotilla on August 18, 1968, after it collided with the Swedish ferryboat Drottningen. On September 5, 1968, the sunken boat was secured as KSK-18 divers assisted salvage crews to secure it.

KSK-18 was involved in ensuring the liquidation of Imes-Import-Export GmbH in Kavelsdorf in December 1989 because civil rights groups did not trust the Volkspolizei to handle it.

In various times, KSK-18 was in charge of providing training to Stasi agents in diving operations.

== Selection and Training ==
Prospective candidates were recruited from the Gesellschaft für Sport und Technik. But after the unit was created, recruits were taken from the ranks of the Volksmarine. Service in the KSK-18 was up to four years.

KSK-18 recruits were trained in unarmed combat and infiltration tactics through maritime and aerial means such as helicopters, paradrop, RHIBs and various vessels. They were also trained in firearms, medical skills and demolitions.

There was also training to operate in winter conditions.

== Duties ==
KSK-18's duties were based on Order 80, issued by the Deputy Defense Minister and Chief of the Volksmarine.

KSK-18 combat swimmer's primary tasks consisted of:

- Reconnaissance of stationary and mobile forces, means and facilities of the enemy on land and under water
- Annihilation or destruction, damage or suppression of reconnaissance forces, means and facilities of the enemy

Secondary tasks consisted of:

- Reconnaissance of physical-geographical and hydro-meteorological conditions on the enemy's coasts
- Search, reconnaissance and destruction of sea mines in one's own coastal area
- Removal of underwater obstacles in the interest of a sea landing
- Rescue of people in distress at sea

KSK-18's mine diver's primary tasks consisted of:

- Search, reconnaissance and destruction of sea mines in ports, on approaches and in the own coastal area
- Reconnaissance of stationary forces, means and facilities of the enemy under water

Secondary tasks consisted of:

- Removal of underwater obstacles
- Underwater patrols to secure and control their own underwater facilities and objects
- Rescuing people in distress at sea
- Salvaging sunken combat technology and equipment and, to a limited extent, tasks as ship divers

== Organization ==
A KSK-18 unit would consist of five to ten divers, who are deployed by submarines and other vessels or by helicopters with or without any parachutes.

== Equipment ==
=== Weapons ===
The MPi-AKS-74Ns, including the MPi-AKS-74NK, was a standard weapon used by KSK-18, alongside various MPi-KMS-72 assault rifles. The Makarov PM is used as sidearm.

Heavy weapons consist of the RPK and later on, the K-500. The Dragunov SVD is used by KSK-18 snipers; the RPG-7 and RPG-18 is used for anti-tank purposes.

Various grenades include the RKG-3, the F-1 and RGD-5. The unit is equipped with SSP-1 and SSP-4 mines with SEMTEX-H and PLNP-10 explosives.

=== Gear ===
KSK-18 diving suits were secretly acquired from France and Sweden despite embargoes since East German-made diving suits were not suitable for KSK-18 operations. By 1980s, the unit expanded that modern rebreathers were acquired by covert purchases with West German marks to modernize and replace their old rebreathers.

KSK-18 had access to diver propulsion vehicles.

== Commanders ==
The following commanded KSK-18:

- First Lieutenant Kurt Klingbeil - April 1958 to April 1959
- Lieutenant Commander Horst Förster - May 1959 to December 1961
- Lieutenant Commander Kurt Schulz - January 1962 to August 1966
- Lieutenant Commander Horst Strauß - September 1966 to August 1967
- Commander Rolf Ritter - September 1967 to October 1972
- Commander Manfred Schmidt - November 1972 to March 1975
- Commander Horst Kerzig - March 1975 to August 26, 1979
- Commander Gerhard Hofmann - August 27, 1979 to July 12, 1984
- Lieutenant Commander Manfred Usczeck - July 1984 to December 31, 1984
- Commander Jürgen Knittel - January 1, 1985 to December 31, 1990
