= Waldemar Verner =

East German navy officer

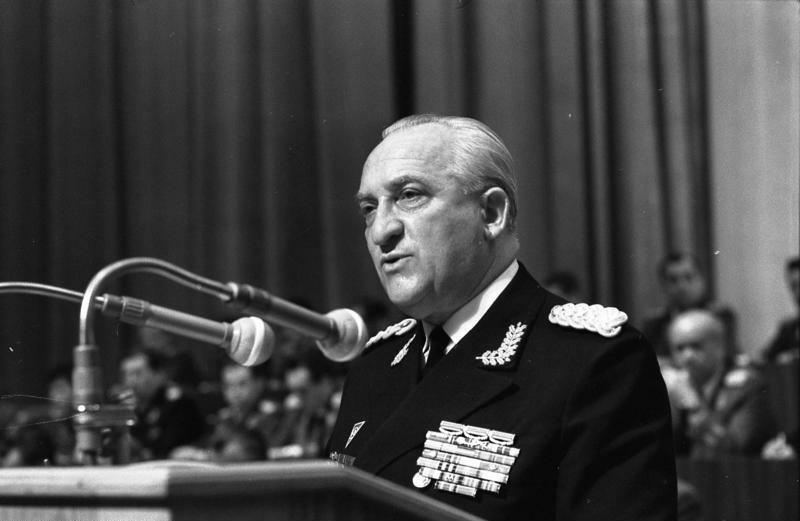
- Verner at the VIII. Delegate Conference of the party organization of the SED in the NVA on 22 May 1971
- Born: 27 August 1914; Chemnitz, Kingdom of Saxony, German Empire
- Died: 15 February 1982 (aged 67); East Berlin, German Democratic Republic
- Military career
- Allegiance: German Democratic Republic
- Branch: Volksmarine
- Service years: 1950-1978
- Rank: Admiral
- Commands: Chief of the Navy (Seestreitkräfte), Deputy Minister of National Defense

Waldemar Verner (27 August 1914 in Chemnitz, Germany – 15 February 1982) was chief of the People's Navy (Volksmarine) of the National People's Army of the German Democratic Republic and brother of Paul Verner.

The son of a metalworker he trained as a window decorator. In 1923, Verner joined the Communist Young Spartacus organization and Communist Youth Federation of Germany (KJVD) in 1929. He became a member of the Communist Party of Germany (KPD) in 1930. Verner was arrested and imprisoned by the Nazis because of their accusing him of illegal activities in the KPD, and he went into exile in the Soviet Union. There he attended the VI World Congress of the Communist Youth International in 1935 and later the International Lenin School. Starting in 1938, Verner was operating for the KPD in Denmark.

He returned to Germany at the end of 1945. After the founding of the SED in 1946 he served as acting District Chairman in Hagenow.

In May 1947, at the suggestion the National Board of the SED and the District Board of Mecklenburg-Vorpommern in the Stralsund he was appointed as the District Chairman replacing Ernst Guth. In September 1947 he served as a delegate at the 2nd Congress of the SED, and in December 1947 at the 1st German People's Congress in Berlin.

Verner ran for the election to the 3rd German People's Congress in May 1949 against Paul Sack (FDGB), Kurt Krönng (LDPD) und Hartwig Stender (CDU) and was elected by 74.9% of the votes cast in the Stralsund election district.

Verner's career as a naval officer began on 15 June 1950. He served as the Inspector General of the Main Administration Sea Police until 1952. From 1952 to 1955, Verner held the office of the Chief of the People's Police-Sea located in Stralsund with the rank of Vizeadmiral (since 1 October 1952). From 1955 to 1956, he studied at the Soviet Naval Academy.

From 1957 to 1959 Verner was Chief of the East German Navy (Seestreitkräfte). He was then appointed as Deputy Minister of National Defense of the German Democratic Republic and the head of the political headquarters of the National People's Army. He served in these positions until his retirement from active service on 31 December 1978. On 1 March 1961 he became the first officer to the People's Navy to be promoted to admiral.

On 8 May 1980 the city of Stralsund honored him in appreciation of his contribution to the development of the city. This honor was withdrawn after the reunification of Germany.

Preceded by Felix Scheffler	Chief of the Volksmarine - German Democratic Republic; 1957–1959	Succeeded by Wilhelm Ehm
