= Project 131 =

Project 131 may refer to:

- An episode of the Canadian television show You Can't Do That on Television
- Underground Project 131, an underground military command headquarters site in Hubei, China.
- An East German class of Torpedo boats, also known as the Libelle-class
