= Wilhelm Ehm =

East German admiral (1918–2009)

Admiral Wilhelm Ehm
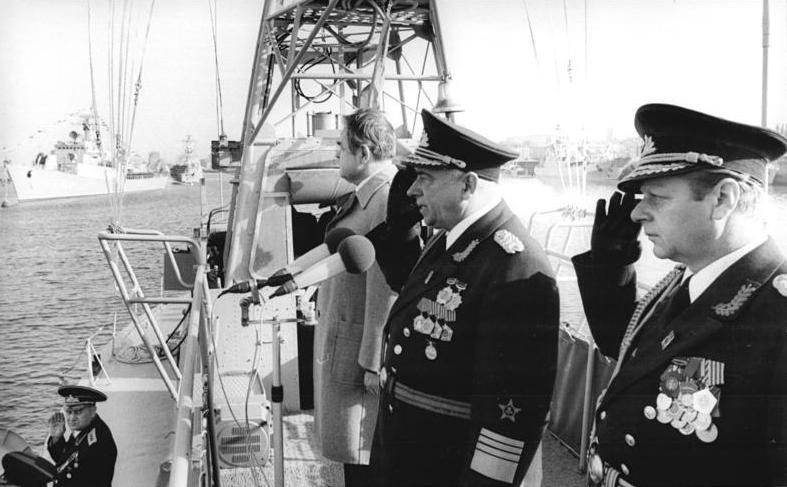
- Wilhelm Ehm, middle, at a Fleet parade for the 30th Anniv of the German Democratic Republic

Commander of the Volksmarine
- In office 25 February 1963 – 30 November 1987
- President: Walter Ulbricht; Friedrich Ebert Jr. (acting); Willi Stoph; Erich Honecker
- Prime Minister: Otto Grotewohl; Willi Stoph; Horst Sindermann; Willi Stoph
- General Secretary: Walter Ulbricht; Erich Honecker
- Preceded by: Heinz Neukirchen
- Succeeded by: Theodor Hoffmann
- In office 1 August 1959 – 31 July 1961
- President: Wilhelm Pieck; Johannes Dieckmann (acting); Walter Ulbricht
- Prime Minister: Otto Grotewohl
- General Secretary: Walter Ulbricht
- Preceded by: Waldemar Verner
- Succeeded by: Heinz Neukirchen

Personal details
- Born: 30 August 1918 Pula, Austrian Littoral, Austro Hungarian Empire (now Croatia)
- Died: 9 August 2009 (aged 90) Rostock, Mecklenburg-Vorpommern, Germany
- Party: Socialist Unity Party of Germany

Military service
- Allegiance: Nazi Germany; East Germany
- Branch/service: Kriegsmarine; Volksmarine
- Years of service: 1938–1945; 1950–1987
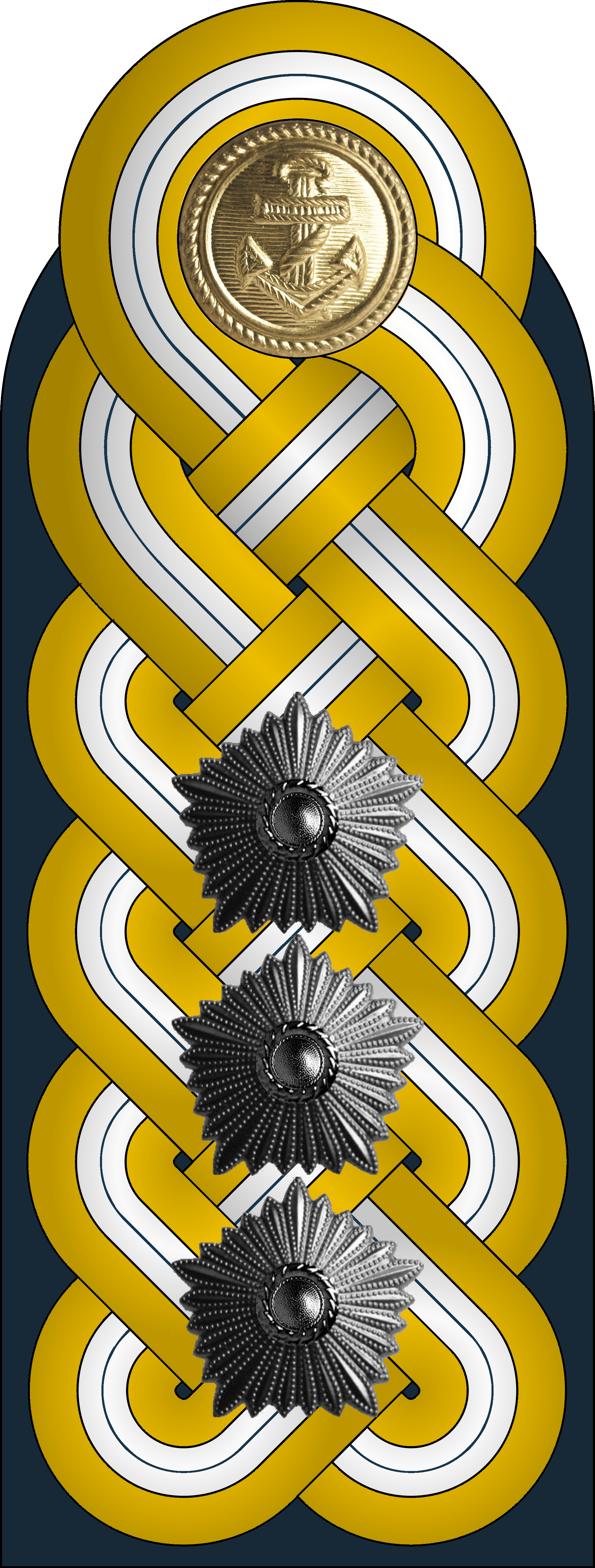
- Rank: Admiral
- Battles/wars: World War II

Wilhelm Ehm (30 August 1918 – 9 August 2009) was an East German admiral who served as a Deputy Minister of National Defense of the German Democratic Republic and the head of the Volksmarine.

== Early life ==
Ehm's father was a carpenter who served as an Armourer and a bugler in the Austro-Hungarian Navy (KuK Kriegsmarine) during World War I. Ehm was born during his father's military service at Pula, a major Austro-Hungarian Navy port on the Adriatic. He had a brother Hermann, born in 1913 and a younger sister Maria, born in 1921.

After the war ended in 1918, his family went back to Komotau (now Chomutov), the hometown of his father in Bohemia, which is now part of the Czech Republic. There his father served as a municipal employee. After the death of his mother in 1931, his father remarried a woman with a daughter and son.

After eight years of elementary school, Ehm apprenticed as an electrician from 1932 to 1938. Later he worked as an electromagnetic radio mechanic. During this period he became a member of the Socialist Workers' Youth and the International Metalworkers' Federation.

== Army service ==
After the occupation of Czechoslovakia in 1939, Ehm was drafted into the German army and remained a soldier until 1945. He served as a non-commissioned (NCO) master radioman (Oberfunkmeister) in the campaigns in France and Russia, although his assignments being primarily in the rear areas, he did not see actual combat. He married Melitta Capek in September 1942 in his hometown of Komotau.

== Soviet captivity ==
When the German 16th Army capitulated in the Courland Pocket (Kurland-Kessel), he was held by the Soviets as a prisoner of war from June 1945 to December 1947. He was held at Prisoner of War Camp #7212 in Karelia. In the camp, he demonstrated his skills as a leader as well as an electrician, quickly becoming a foreman of his work brigade. Ehm worked actively to support the camp's Antifascist committee. His ability to manage people and his desire to cooperate with his Soviet superiors led to a rapid rise in the prisoner leadership. In the spring of 1947 he received his first postcard from his wife, Melitte, who was living on the island of Rügen, bringing him the first news of his son's existence. After his release in December 1947, he worked as a casual laborer to support his family. He was a skilled craftsman, but he was unsuccessful in finding work as an electrician at the Buna works Berlin or at the post office, because he did not have a bicycle.

== Socialist Unity Party work ==
Ehm joined the Socialist Unity Party of Germany (SED) in 1948. He worked for the (SED) district leadership in Rügen and later attended the district party school. During this early party work he met Waldemar Verner who was the first district Secretary of the SED in Stralsund who was also later Ehm's predecessor as Chief of the People's Navy (Volksmarine).

== People's Navy career ==
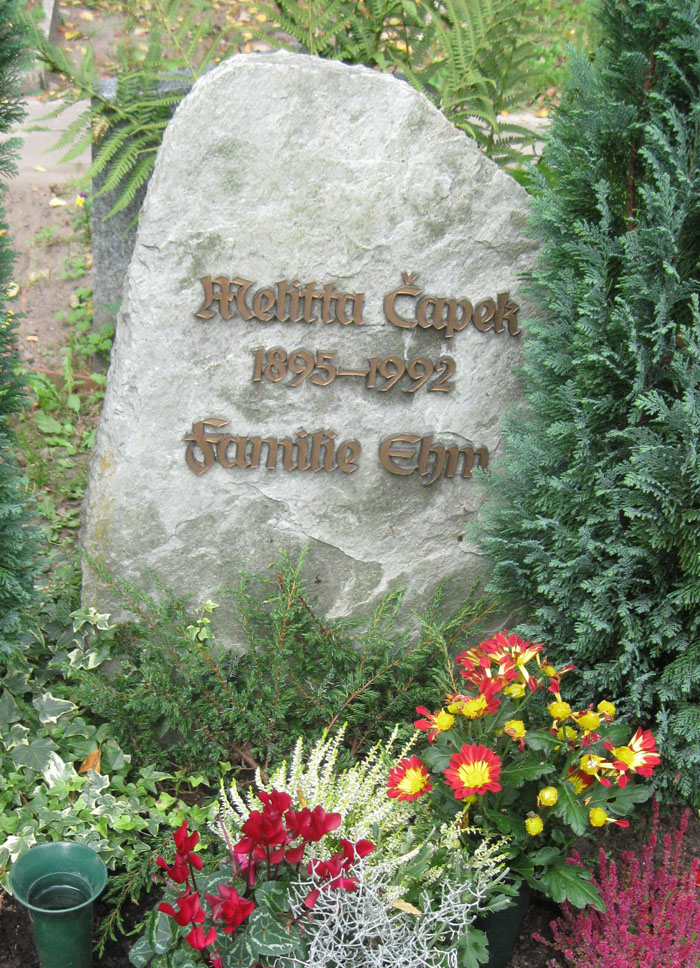
Wilhelm Ehm's Gravesite at the Neuer Friedhof in Rostock

Between 1950 and 1958, Ehm (a former army NCO) ascended quickly in the naval forces of the German Democratic Republic. Ehm was different from other early East German military leaders, in that he lacked their long history as communists or socialists since the Weimar Republic. However he possessed a rare and important combination of military professionalism, innate leadership and political reliability.

From 1950 to 1951, Ehm served as the communications officer for the headquarters of the Sea Police (Seepolizei). From 1954 to 1957, he was Deputy Chief of Staff and Head of Organizational Administration for the People's Police Sea and the Naval Forces. He served as the Deputy Chief of Navy and from 1958 to 1959, as the head of the Rear Services. With his appointment as Konteradmiral on 1 August 1959, he took command of the People's Navy. Ehm was promoted to Vizeadmiral in March 1964, and commanded the People's Navy until his retirement on 30 November 1987, with the exception of August 1961 to February 1963, when he attended the Soviet Naval Academy, graduating with distinction. In 1972 he also became the Deputy Minister of National Defense. Ehm was promoted to admiral on the 28th anniversary of the founding of the German Democratic Republic in 1977. From 1981 to 1989, Ehm served as a member of the Central Committee of the Socialist Unity Party.

His many decorations and awards include the Karl Marx Order (Karl-Marx-Orden), Honor Clasp to the Order of Merit for the Fatherland (Ehrenspange des Vaterländischen Verdienstordens (VVO)) and the Scharnhorst Order (Scharnhorstorden).

Military offices
Preceded by Waldemar Verner	Commander of the Volksmarine; 1 August 1959–31 July 1961	Succeeded by Heinz Neukirchen
Preceded by Heinz Neukirchen	Commander of the Volksmarine; 25 February 1963–30 November 1987	Succeeded by Theodor Hoffmann
