= Hans-Joachim Dönitz =

- Born: 26 June 1934
- Died: 31 December 2010 (aged 76)
- Allegiance: German Democratic Republic
- Branch: Volksmarine
- Service years: 1952-1990
- Rank: Rear Admiral (Konteradmiral)
- Commands: 6th Flotilla, People's Navy (Volksmarine)

Hans-Joachim Dönitz (26 June 1934 in Leipzig, Germany - 31 December 2010 in Strausberg, Germany) was a Konteradmiral in the East German Navy (Volksmarine).

His father was a sales representative. After leaving school Hans-Joachim Dönitz studied from 1948 to 1952 in the specialty of sales representative. On 12 May 1952 he entered the service in the Maritime People Police (Volkspolizei See (VP-See)), forerunner of the East German People's Navy “Volksmarine”. From 1952 to 1954 he studied at the VP-See Officer's School in Stralsund.

After his graduation until 1956, he served as an operations officer in the Sassnitz coastal region. From 1956 to 1959 he attended naval training courses in the Soviet Union. In 1957 he joined the East German Socialist Unity Party (SED). From 1959 to 1961, he served as a navigator in a minesweeper unit. From 1961 to 1962 he was a senior officer for navigation and for engineering in the Volksmarine's training command. He then served as Chief of Staff and navigator in the anti-submarine division in the 4th Flotilla, based at Warnemünde. This was followed by service as Chief of Staff of the Torpedo Boat Brigade in the 6th Flotilla on the island of Ruegen. From 1963 to 1965 he commanded this Brigade.

From 1965 to 1968 Dönitz attended a staff course at the Soviet Naval Academy in Leningrad. After returning from the Soviet Union, he was again appointed commander of Torpedo Boat Brigade. In 1971 he became Chief of Staff and Deputy Commander of the Flotilla. On 1 December 1974 he was promoted to Kapitän zur See (naval captain).

From 1974 to 1983 he served as the commander of the 6th Flotilla, succeeding Kapitän zur See Theodor Hoffmann, the future Minister of National Defense of East Germany. He was promoted to Konteradmiral (Rear Admiral) on 7 October 1980. From 1983 to 1987 he served as the Deputy Chief of Training and Head of the Department for Combat Training for the People's Navy. In 1987 he joined the Ministry of National Defense (MfNV), as the Chief Inspector of the People's Navy responsible for administrative inspection. He retired on 30 September 1990, just days before the reunification of Germany.

== Medals and decorations ==
- Vaterländischen Verdienstorden (VVO) in Bronze
- Kampforden „Für Verdienste um Volk und Vaterland“ in Silver
