= Elchlepp =

Elchlepp is a surname. Notable people with the surname include:

- Friedrich Elchlepp (1924–2002), German Oberleutnant zur See in Nazi Germany's Kriegsmarine
- Isoldé Elchlepp (born 1942), German protest song singer under the pseudonym Dominique, and an operatic mezzo-soprano and soprano
