= Konteradmiral =

Officer's rank in the German and Austro-Hungarian navy

Konteradmiral (German pronunciation: [ˈkɔntɐʔatmiˌʁaːl]; abbreviated KAdm) is a senior naval flag officer rank in several German-speaking countries, equivalent to counter or rear admiral.

== Austria-Hungary ==
K.u.K. Kriegsmarine

Command flag

Cuff title

K.u.K. Konteradmiral

In the Austro-Hungarian K.u.K. Kriegsmarine (1849 to 1918) there were the flag officer ranks Kontreadmiral (also spelled Konteradmiral in the 20th century), Viceadmiral, Admiral and Großadmiral.

== Germany ==
Counter admiral Konteradmiral
- Shoulder board and mounting loop

- Cuff title
- Country: Germany
- Service branch: German Navy
- Abbreviation: KAdm
- Rank group: Flag officer
- NATO rank code: OF-7
- Pay grade: B7
- Next higher rank: Vizeadmiral
- Next lower rank: Flottillenadmiral
- Equivalent ranks: Generalmajor

Konteradmiral, abbreviated KAdm or KADM, is the second lowest naval flag officer rank in the German Navy. It is equivalent to Generalmajor in the Heer and Luftwaffe or to Admiralstabsarzt and Generalstabsarzt in the Zentraler Sanitätsdienst der Bundeswehr.

=== Rank insignia and rating ===
The rank insignia, worn on the sleeves and shoulders, is a single five-pointed star above a single normal stripe and a wide stripe. The star is omitted on rank loops. Konteradmiral is a B7 grade in the pay rules of the Federal Ministry of Defence.

The sequence of ranks in decreasing seniority is:

- OF-9: Admiral / General
- OF-8: Vizeadmiral / Generalleutnant
- OF-7: Konteradmiral / Generalmajor
- OF-6: Flottillenadmiral / Brigadegeneral

=== History ===
==== Imperial German Navy and Kriegsmarine ====
In the Kaiserliche Marine and Kriegsmarine, Konteradmiral was an OF-6 one-star officer rank equivalent to a Heer or Luftwaffe Generalmajor, and to an SS-Brigadeführer and Generalmajor of the Waffen-SS.

The rank insignia consisted of shoulder strap and sleeve stripes. Shoulder straps had to be worn on uniform jackets and consisted of twisted gold-braids (no pips or stars) on padding in navy blue weapon color.

Cuff insignia consisted of one golden big stripe, one normal stripe, and a five-point naval star above. The sleeve rings encircled the lower cuffs.

The last surviving Kriegsmarine Konteradmiral, Eberhard Godt, died at the age of 95 on 13 September 1995.

==== National People's Army ====
Konteradmiral (OF-6) was the lowest flag officer grade of the Volksmarine, equivalent to the one-star rank Generalmajor (OF-6 as well).

In the GDR Volksmarine there were three flag officer ranks: Konteradmiral, Vizeadmiral, and Admiral. The GDR State Council decided from 25 March 25, 1982 to introduce the rank of Flottenadmiral .

Konteradmirals of the GDR Volksmarine

Name	Dates	Name	Dates
Bernig, Herbert	1931–	Laue, Wolfgang	1929–96
Dönitz, Hans-Joachim	1934–2010	Miethe, Peter	1944–
Elchlepp, Friedrich	1924-2002	Milzow, Helmut	1932–
Fischer, Richard	1906–91	Müller, Gerhard	1941–
Grießbach, Eberhard	1935–	Nitz, Egon	1934–2011
Heinecke, Lothar	1933–85	Partzsch, Hans	1930–2012
Heniger, Werner	1929–	Pöschel, Günther	1933–
Heß, Hans	1929–	Rödel, Rolf	1940–2013
Irmscher, Heinz	1920–2004	Scheffler, Felix	1915–86
Jordt, Heinrich	1917–87	Städtke, Herbert	1931–2008
Kahnt, Klaus	1935–	Streubel, Johannes	1921–90
Kotte, Werner	1931–	Wegner, Rudi	1923–95
Münch, Joachim	1941–	Weiß, Karl	1935–2012

=== Insignia ===
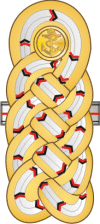
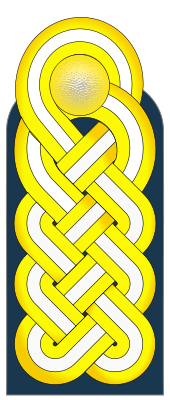
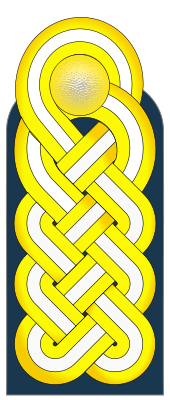
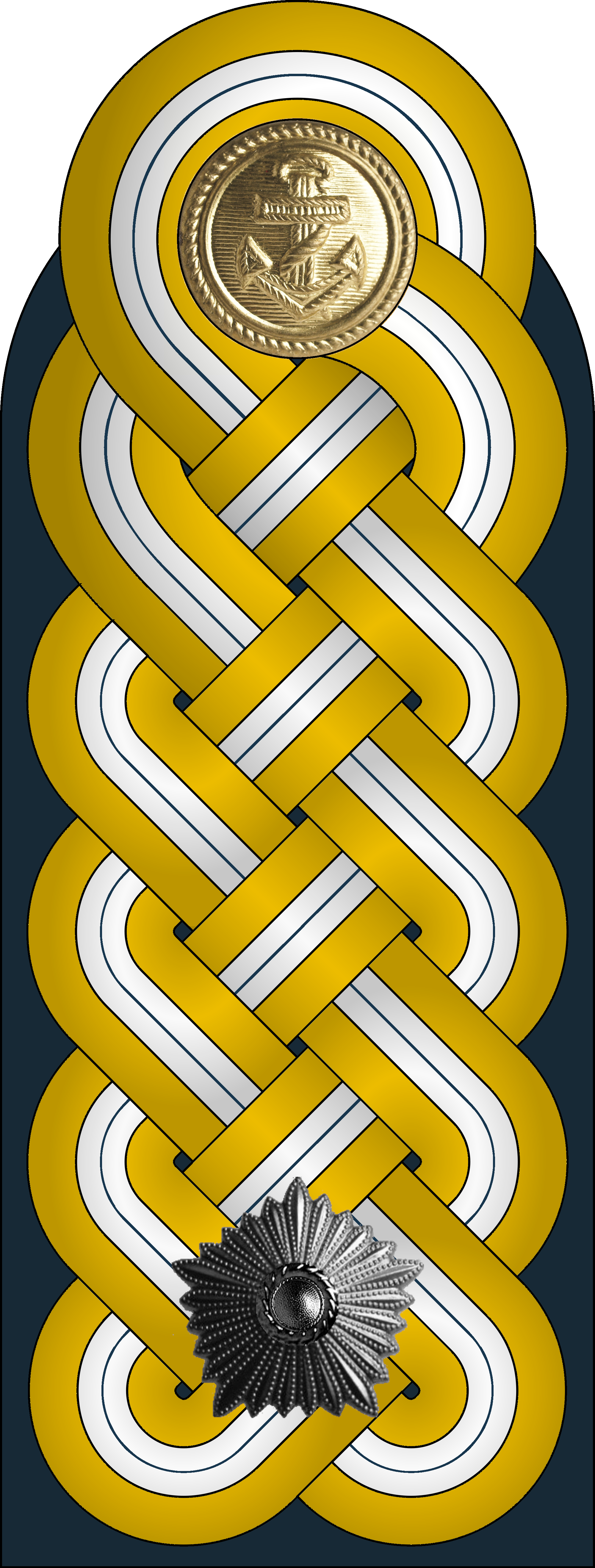
Insignia	Shoulder	Sleeve	Rank flag	Higher/lower rank
Imperial German Navy				Vizeadmiral Kapitän zur See
Reichsmarine				Vizeadmiral Kapitän zur See
Kriegsmarine				Vizeadmiral Kommodore
Volksmarine				Vizeadmiral Kapitän zur See
German Navy				Vizeadmiral Flottillenadmiral

== See also ==
- List of admirals of Germany#Konteradmirale
