= Theodor Hoffmann (admiral) =

East German admiral (1935–2018)

Admiral Theodor Hoffmann
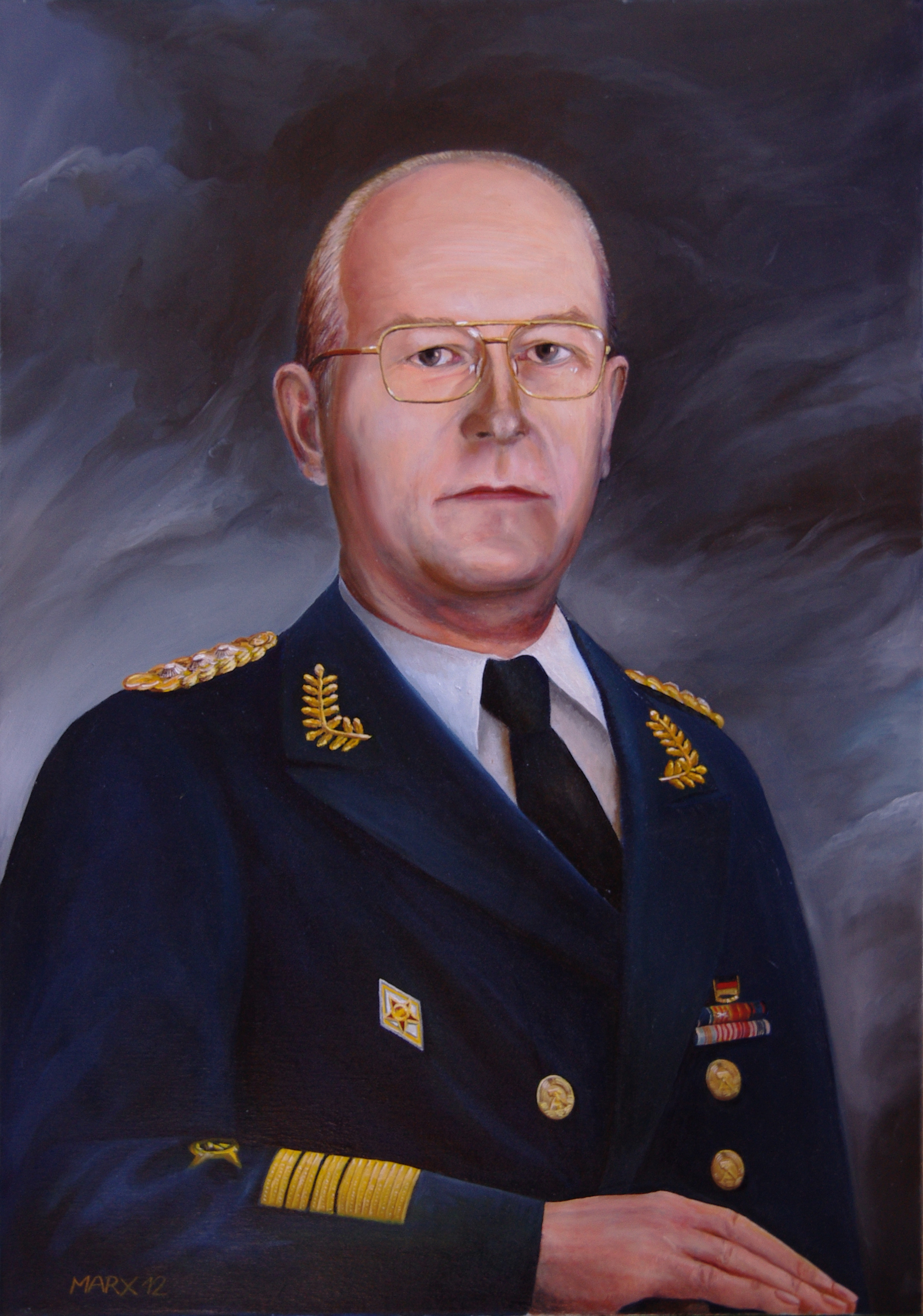
- Painting by Eberhard Marx, 2013

Minister of National Defense
- In office 18 November 1989 – 12 April 1990
- Chairman of the Council of Ministers: Hans Modrow
- Appointed by: Egon Krenz
- Preceded by: Heinz Kessler
- Succeeded by: Rainer Eppelmann (Disarmament and Defence)

Chief of the Volksmarine
- In office 1 December 1987 – 17 November 1989
- Minister: Heinz Kessler
- Preceded by: Wilhelm Ehm
- Succeeded by: Hendrik Born

Personal details
- Born: 27 February 1935 Gustävel, Mecklenburg, Germany
- Died: 1 November 2018 (aged 83) Berlin, Germany

Military service
- Allegiance: East Germany
- Branch/service: Volksmarine
- Years of service: 1963–1990
- Rank: Admiral
- Commands: People's Navy (Volksmarine); National People's Army; Minister of National Defense

Theodor Hoffmann (27 February 1935 – 1 November 2018) was an East German Admiral who served as the head of the People's Navy (Volksmarine) and as the last Minister of National Defense of the German Democratic Republic and head of the National People's Army.

== Early life ==
Hoffmann worked from 1949 to 1951 in agriculture. From 1951 to 1952, Hoffmann was a Pioneer Leader in the Wismar District Free German Youth (FDJ).

== Military career ==
In 1952, Hoffmann became a sailor in the Main Administration Sea PoliceSea Police (Seepolizei), which would later become the East German People's Navy (Volksmarine). He attended the Officers School of the People's Police at Stralsund and joined the Socialist Unity Party of Germany in 1956. From 1960 to 1963, he attended the Soviet Naval War Academy in Leningrad and earned a diploma in military science, which he subsequently used to hold various senior positions in the 6th Fleet of the People's Navy. From 1971 to 1974, he was chief of the 6th Fleet with the rank of frigate captain. He later became deputy chief of staff for operational work in the People's Navy command. In 1985, he was appointed deputy chief of the People's Navy and chief of staff. In 1987, was appointed Chef der Volksmarine (Chief of the People's Navy) and Deputy Minister of National Defense in the rank of vice admiral (two stars).

He was promoted to admiral (three stars) and replaced Heinz Kessler as the Minister for National Defence and head of the National People's Army, serving from 18 November 1989 to 23 April 1990. After his initial selection, Hoffmann was told by the outgoing Defence Minister (Army General Heinz Keßler) that he would be promoted to Generaloberst (colonel-general) in the army; Hoffmann refused to switch services, however, and obtained approval from Egon Krenz (Erich Honecker’s successor) to remain a naval admiral. After the free 1990 elections, he was succeeded in the ministry by CDU politician Rainer Eppelmann (now called Minister for Disarmament and Defense), but remained commander of the National People's Army until its disbandment and incorporation into the Bundeswehr.

In 1993, Hoffmann published his reminiscences of last days of the National People's Army, Das letzte Kommando; Ein Minister erinnert sich (The Last Command: A Minister Remembers). In 1995 he published his autobiography Kommando Ostsee; Vom Matrosen zum Admiral (Baltic Sea Command: From Sailor to Admiral).

== Personal life ==
Hoffmann married Helga Qualo in October 1957, and had two sons: Norbert (born in 1958) and Rene (born in 1965). Hoffmann died on 1 November 2018 at the age of 83.

== Awards and medals ==
Over his life, Hoffmann received the following awards:

- Patriotic Order of Merit
- Scharnhorst Order
- Combat Order for Merit for the Nation and Fatherland - Silver
- Distinguished Service Medal of the National People's Army - Gold
- Medal for Loyal Service in the Shipping Industry - Silver
- Medal Brotherhood in Arms - Gold
- Medal "For Strengthening of Brotherhood in Arms"
- Jubilee Medal 30 Years of the National People's Army

Political offices
Preceded by Wilhelm Ehm	Chief of the Volksmarine - German Democratic Republic; 1987–1989	Succeeded by Hendrik Born
