= Erich Peter =

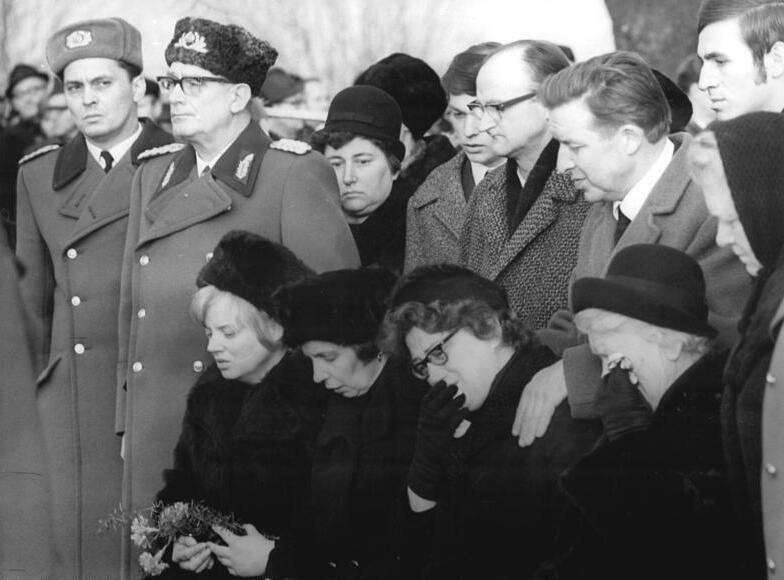
- Peter in 1972
- Born: 1919
- Died: 1987 (aged 67–68); Bad Saarow, East Germany
- Military career
- Allegiance: Nazi Germany; East Germany
- Branch: Wehrmacht; National People's Army; GDR Border Troops
- Rank: Generaloberst
- Conflicts: World War II
- Other work: Deputy Minister of National Defense

Erich Peter (1919–1987) was a German general in the National People's Army. He commanded the GDR Border Troops of East Germany, also holding the position of the Deputy Minister of National Defense.

== Career ==
Erich Peter was born in 1919 into a working-class family. He took part in World War II, being taken prisoner by the American forces in 1945. Shortly after the end of the war, Peter joined the Communist Party of Germany. In 1948, he joined the Volkspolizei, earning promotions in the force and becoming head of a technical school for armored troops in Erfurt. He was educated in the Military Academy of the General Staff of the Armed Forces of the Soviet Union. Upon graduating in 1956, Peter was transferred to the National People's Army.

Peter was appointed the chief of the German Border Police in 1960. In 1972, the border troops were separated from the army. This changed the name of Peter's position. He became Deputy Minister of National Defense and Chief of Border Troops. After being promoted to Colonel General on July 14, 1979, Peter was one of eleven generals to achieve this rank. He retired soon thereafter. Peter died in 1987.
