= Heinz Neukirchen =

German navy officer

- Born: 13 January 1915; Duisburg, Kingdom of Prussia, German Empire
- Died: 8 December 1986 (aged 71) Rostock, Bezirk Rostock, German Democratic Republic
- Allegiance: Nazi Germany; German Democratic Republic
- Branch: Kriegsmarine; Volksmarine
- Service years: 1951-1965
- Rank: Vizeadmiral
- Commands: People's Navy (Volksmarine)
- Conflicts: Spanish Civil War; World War II

Heinz Neukirchen (German pronunciation: [ˈhaɪnts nɔʏˈkɪʁçn̩]; 13 January 1915 – 8 December 1986) was an officer of the Kriegsmarine in World War II, and a Vizeadmiral in the People's Navy (Volksmarine) of the German Democratic Republic as well as President of the East German Directorate of Maritime and Port Industries. He was the author of several maritime books.

Neukirchen was born in Duisburg, Germany, the son of a small farmer and vegetable dealer. After graduation from high school he worked an internship from 1931 to 1932, then one year as a freelancer for the Düsseldorfer News. Neukirchen began service in Nazi Germany's Kriegsmarine in 1935. As a crewmember of the German cruiser Köln Neukirchen served in the Spanish Civil War and received the Spanish Cross. From 1939 to 1940, holding the rank of a boatswain, he was a harbor protection commander. Following several warrant officer courses, Neukirchen served from 1943 to 1944 as a watch officer on a mine ship. In the last year of World War II, he was a Lieutenant and commander of Submarine chaser stationed in Norway. In addition to this duty he became a National-Socialist guidance officer in 1944 and served in 1945 as a battery commander of Naval infantry. From 1945 to 1949 he was in Soviet captivity.

He joined the National Democratic Party of Germany (NDPD) in 1949, and worked until 1950, as a manager of the NDPD political department in Mecklenburg. After one year he became the Deputy Chairman of the Board of the NDPD for the Berlin district.

Neukirchen joined the Main Administration Sea Police (Hauptverwaltung Seepolizei (HVS)) on 1 March 1951. From 1954 to 1956, Neukirchen was Chief of Staff of the Sea Police. He was appointed to the rank of rear admiral on 1 October 1952. In 1956 he attended the Soviet Naval Academy. Upon his return, he served until 1961 as Deputy Chief of the People's Navy (Seestreitkräfte/Volksmarine) and as Chief of Staff of the People's Navy command.

In 1959, he married Irmgard Neukirchen, a mother of 6 children from a previous husband.

He commanded the People's Navy (Volksmarine) from 1961 to 1963, while Wilhelm Ehm attended the Soviet Naval Academy. After Ehm's return, he served again as a Deputy Chief of the People's Navy and Chief of Staff of the People's Navy command until his retirement from active service on 30 November 1965. On 1 March 1964 he was promoted to vice admiral.

After 1965, Neukirchen served as the President of East Germany's Directorate of Maritime and Port Industries. From 1965-67 he also served as the first chairman of the Football Club FC Hansa Rostock.

Neukirchen died in 1986 in Rostock, GDR.

== Neukirchen's publications ==
- Krieg zur See (Deutscher Militärverlag, Berlin 1966)
- Handbuch Seeverkehr. Bd. 1 (1969)
- Handbuch Seeverkehr. Bd. 2. Collective authors: Reinhold Dopatka u.a. Head Author: Günter Babst; (Editor) Reinhold Dopatka und Heinz Neukirchen (1970)
- Handbuch Seeverkehr. Bd. 3. Head author: Gottfried Schulze; Lothar Uhlig; (Editor) Gottfried Schulze und Heinz Neukirchen (1970)
- Seefahrt gestern und heute (Transpress, Berlin 1970)
- "Häfen und Schiffe" (Transpress, Berlin 1974)
- Piraten - Seeraub auf allen Meeren (Transpress, Berlin 1977)
- "Geusen - Lieber ertrunken als gefangen" (Transpress, Berlin 1980)
- "Klar vorn und achtern - Auf einem Schaukelpferd zum Rio de la Plata" (Transpress, Berlin 1983)
- "Mit ungewissem Kurs" (Transpress, Berlin 1985)
- Seemacht im Spiegel der Geschichte (Transpress, Berlin 1982)
- Seefahrt im Wandel der Jahrtausende (Transpress, Berlin 1985)
- Seelord Gerry oder Wiedersehen mit Afrika (Transpress, Berlin 1989)

His books have been translated into many languages.

Preceded by Wilhelm Ehm	Chief of the Volksmarine - German Democratic Republic; 1961–1963	Succeeded by Wilhelm Ehm
