= Generalleutnant =

General officer rank in the German and Austrian armed forces

Generalleutnant (German pronunciation: [ɡenəˈʁaːlˌlɔɪtnant]) is the German-language variant of lieutenant general, used in some German speaking countries.

== Austria ==
Generalleutnant

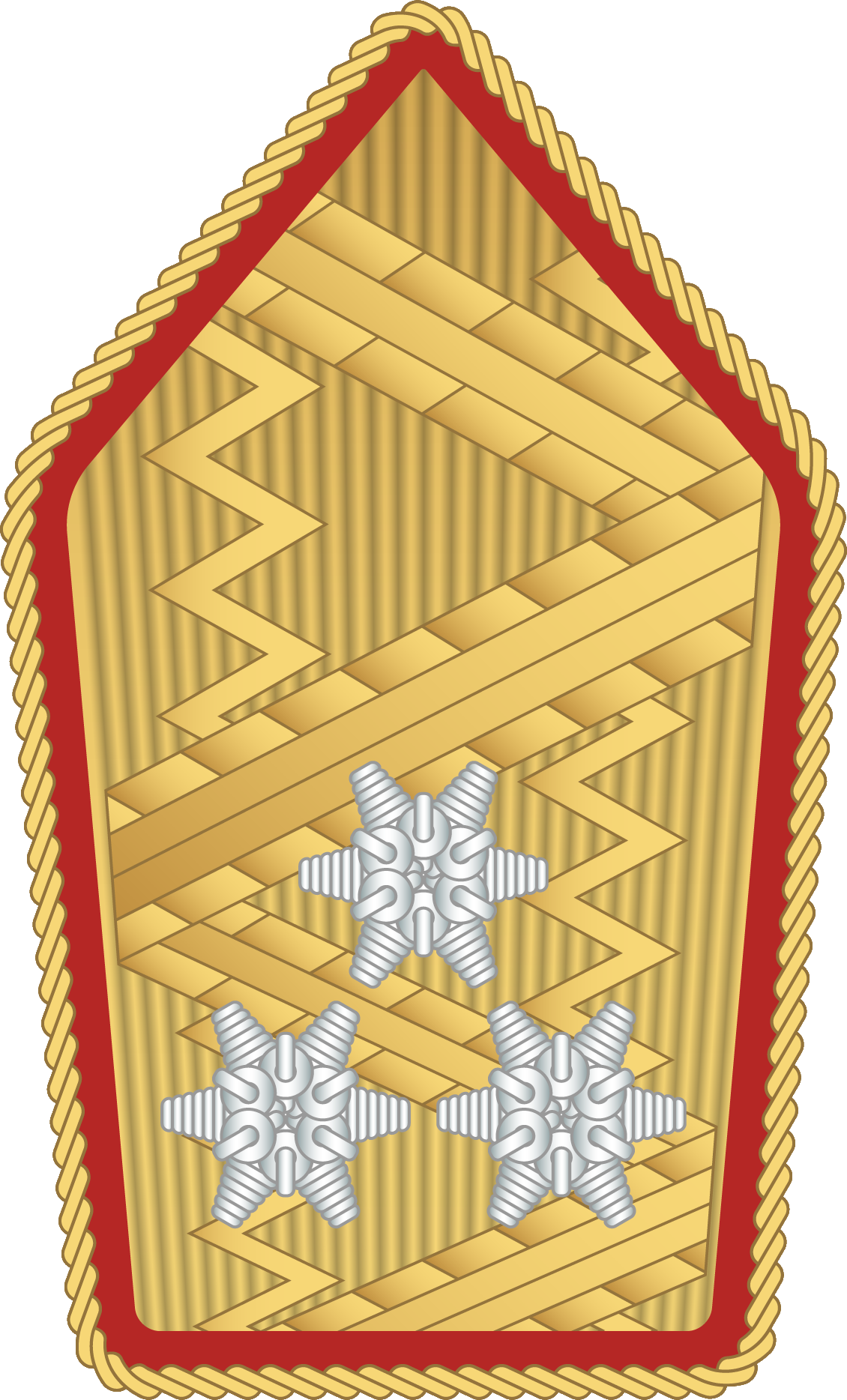
- Service and field uniform
- Country: Austria
- Non-NATO rank: OF-8 (Note: Although Austria is not a NATO member, there are official NATO rank approximations.)

Generalleutnant is the second highest general officer rank in the Austrian Armed Forces (Bundesheer), roughly equivalent to the NATO rank of OF-8.

== Germany ==
Generalleutnant
- Gorget patches

- Army and Air Force insignia
- Country: Germany
- Service branch: German Army; German Air Force
- Abbreviation: GenLt
- Rank group: General officer
- NATO rank code: OF-8
- Pay grade: B9
- Formation: 1956 (current)
- Next higher rank: General
- Next lower rank: Generalmajor
- Equivalent ranks: Vizeadmiral

Generalleutnant, short GenLt, ('lieutenant general') is the second highest general officer rank in the German Army (Heer) and the German Air Force (Luftwaffe). This three-star rank in other countries is lieutenant general.

=== Rank in modern Germany ===
The rank is rated OF-8 in NATO, and is grade B9 in the pay rules of the Federal Ministry of Defence. It is equivalent to Vizeadmiral in the German Navy (Marine), or to Generaloberstabsarzt, and Admiraloberstabsarzt in the Zentraler Sanitätsdienst der Bundeswehr. On the shoulder straps (Heer, Luftwaffe) there are three golden pips (stars) in golden oak leaves.

=== History ===
==== German armies and air forces until 1945 ====
Historical ranks (ascending):

- Generalmajor
- Generalleutnant
- General der Waffengattung
- Generaloberst
- Generalfeldmarschall

===== Generalleutnant of the Wehrmacht =====
Generalleutnant was in the German Reich, and Nazi Germany the second lowest general officer rank, comparable to the two-star rank in many NATO-armed forces (Rangcode OF-7). It was equivalent to Vizeadmiral in the Kriegsmarine, and SS-Gruppenführer in the Waffen-SS until 1945.

Rank insignia Generalleutnant/ Vizeadmiral

Branch	German Army	Luftwaffe	Waffen-SS	Kriegsmarine
Collar				None
Shoulder
Sleeve
Rank designation	Generalleutnant		SS-Gruppenführer und Generalleutnant der Waffen-SS	Vizeadmiral

==== National People's Army ====
Generalleutnant was in the so-called armed organs of the GDR (German: Bewaffnete Organe der DDR), represented by Ministry of National Defence, and Ministry for State Security, the second lowest general officer rank, comparable to the two-star rank in many NATO-Armed forces. This was in reference to Soviet military doctrine and in line with other armed forces of the Warsaw Pact.

=== Insignia ===
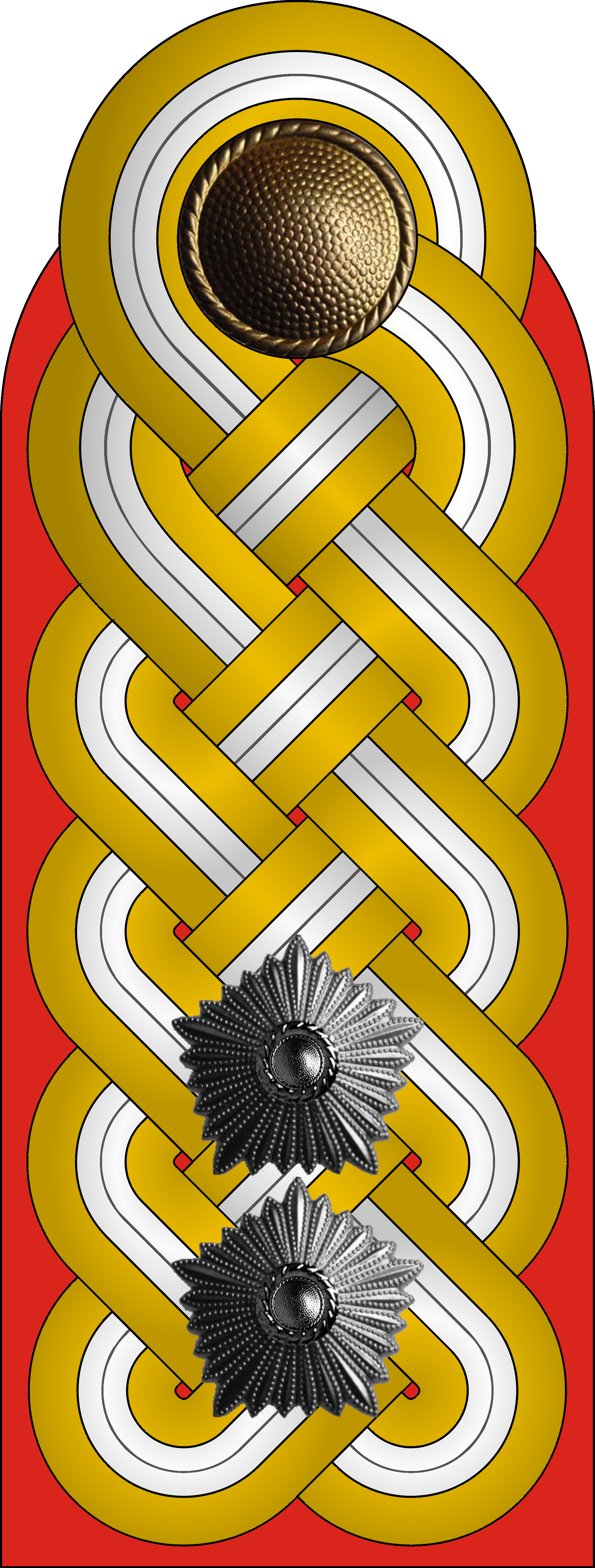
Insignia	Shoulder	Higher/lower rank
German Empire Weimar Republic Nazi Germany		General der Waffengattung Generalmajor
East Germany		Generaloberst Generalmajor
Germany		General Generalmajor

== See also ==
- Comparative military ranks of World War I
- Comparative military ranks of World War II
- Ranks of the National People's Army
