= Main Administration Sea Police =

East German maratine organization

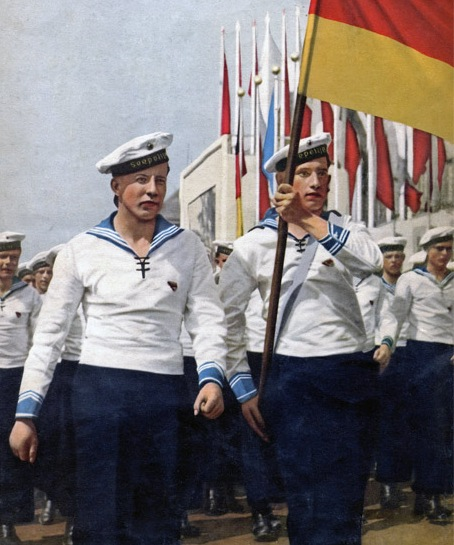
1952 Sea Police Parade

The Main Administration Sea Police (Hauptverwaltung Seepolizei (HVS)) was an East German maritime organization established with support of the Soviet Navy on June 16, 1950. It was an armed organization of the East German Ministry of the Interior designed to protect the German Democratic Republic's (GDR) maritime border and coastal areas. The HVS was established to organize, train and operate naval forces during a period in which East Germany officially had no military. The Sea Police initially were responsible for protection of fisheries and for anti-smuggling activities. At the same time it was intended from the beginning to use the force as the core of a future East German navy. One of the first tasks of the Sea Police was the clearance of mines in the coastal waters of the GDR.

== Organization ==
Headquartered at Berlin-Niederschöneweide, the Sea Police was led by Waldemar Verner and his chief of staff was Heinz Neukirchen. Assigned to the HVS were a minesweeper division, a coast guard ship division, a salvage command, schools, and a recruit training battalion. On July 27, 1950, the HVA assumed command of the newly formed Seehydrographischer Dienst (Sea Hydrographic Service] of the GDR. By the end of 1951, the organization had grown to around 3,000 men.

For political reasons it was a “police” organization in name only. All of its regulations and training procedures were modeled along navy lines. Its uniforms closely resembled those of the World War II German Kriegsmarine.

== Personnel and Training ==
The Sea Police was organized with less experienced personnel because nearly two thirds of the members of the Kriegsmarine had been captured by British and American forces and had chosen to stay in the western occupations zones after their release from captivity. The HVA also deliberately wanted to avoid relying too much on former Kriegsmarine veterans. This is why training was at the forefront of the establishment of the Sea Police.

Establishment of the initial Seepolizeischule (See Police School) began in March 1950. It was located in Parow and was later named after its first leader, Walter Steffens. The school began operations on August 1, 1950. Eventually a school for seamen was established at Kühlungsborn, a school for petty officers at Parow, and an officer training school at Stralsund, all on the Baltic Coast. This training provided the foundation of leaders for the future Volksmarine (People’s Navy).

Many Sea Police officers were sent to the Soviet Union for advanced maritime training. By the end of 1954 at least fifty officers had received technical training in various naval schools in the Soviet Union.

== Material and equipment ==
In May 1950, the Soviet armed forces gave the Sea Police six minesweepers that had previously belonged to the Kriegsmarine. Starting in 1951, more ships were supplied by shipyards in the Soviet Union and East Germany. For coastal patrols, the Sea Police received some 150 horses and motor vehicles.

== Transition to the People's Police Sea ==
In April 1953 the Soviet leadership chose to establish a regular armed force in the GDR. On August 1, 1953, units of the Sea Police were restructured as the Volkspolizei See (VP-See) (People's Police-Sea) to create the foundation for an effective militarized maritime force. With the establishment of the National People's Army (NVA), this became the Verwaltung Seestreitkräfte der NVA (Naval Forces Administration of the NVA) on March 1, 1956. And finally, in 1960, the naval forces received the honorary title Volksmarine (People’s Navy) which was also responsible for units operating as part of the Grenzbrigade Küste (Coastal Border Brigade).
