= Libelle-class torpedo boat =

East German class of torpedo boats

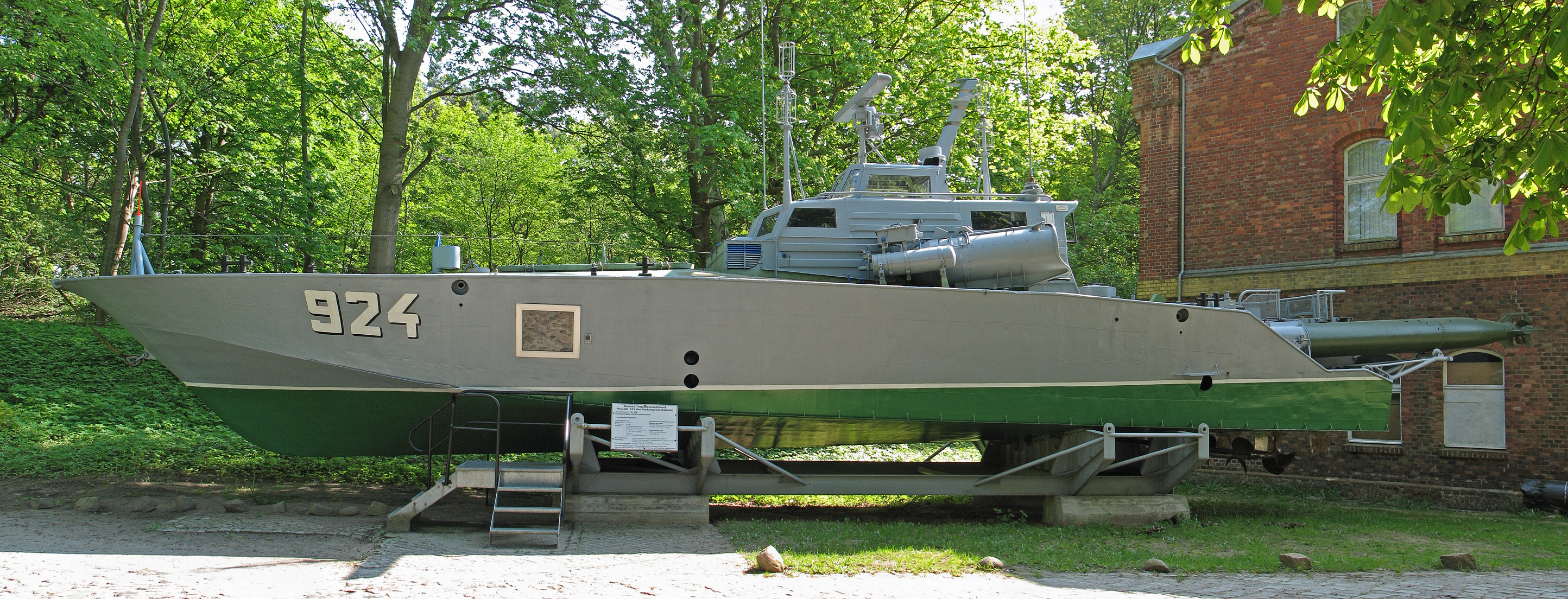
- A Libelle-class boat on display

Class overview
- Name: Libelle (Project 131.4)
- Operators: Volksmarine
- Built: 1974–1977
- In commission: 1974–1989
- Completed: 31
- Lost: 1
- Retired: 30
- Preserved: 4

General characteristics
- Type: Torpedo boat
- Displacement: 30 t (30 long tons) standard; 35 t (34 long tons) full load
- Length: 18.96 m (62 ft 2 in)
- Beam: 4.42 m (14 ft 6 in)
- Draught: 1.74 m (5 ft 9 in) (lower end of propeller)
- Propulsion: 3 x shaft M-50F4 diesels 1,200 hp (890 kW)
- Speed: 48 knots (89 km/h; 55 mph)
- Range: 300 nmi (560 km; 350 mi) at 34 knots (63 km/h; 39 mph)
- Endurance: 750 hours
- Complement: 5 (1 officer)
- Armament: 1 × ZU-23-2 23 mm gun in a twin gun mount; 2 × 533 mm torpedo tubes containing one Type 53 torpedo each; 2 × naval mine ejectors

The Libelle-class torpedo boat, also known as that Project 131 Libelle torpedo boat (German: Libelle Klasse, lit. 'Dragonfly class'), was a class of torpedo boats designed, built, and used by the German Democratic Republic during the Cold War.

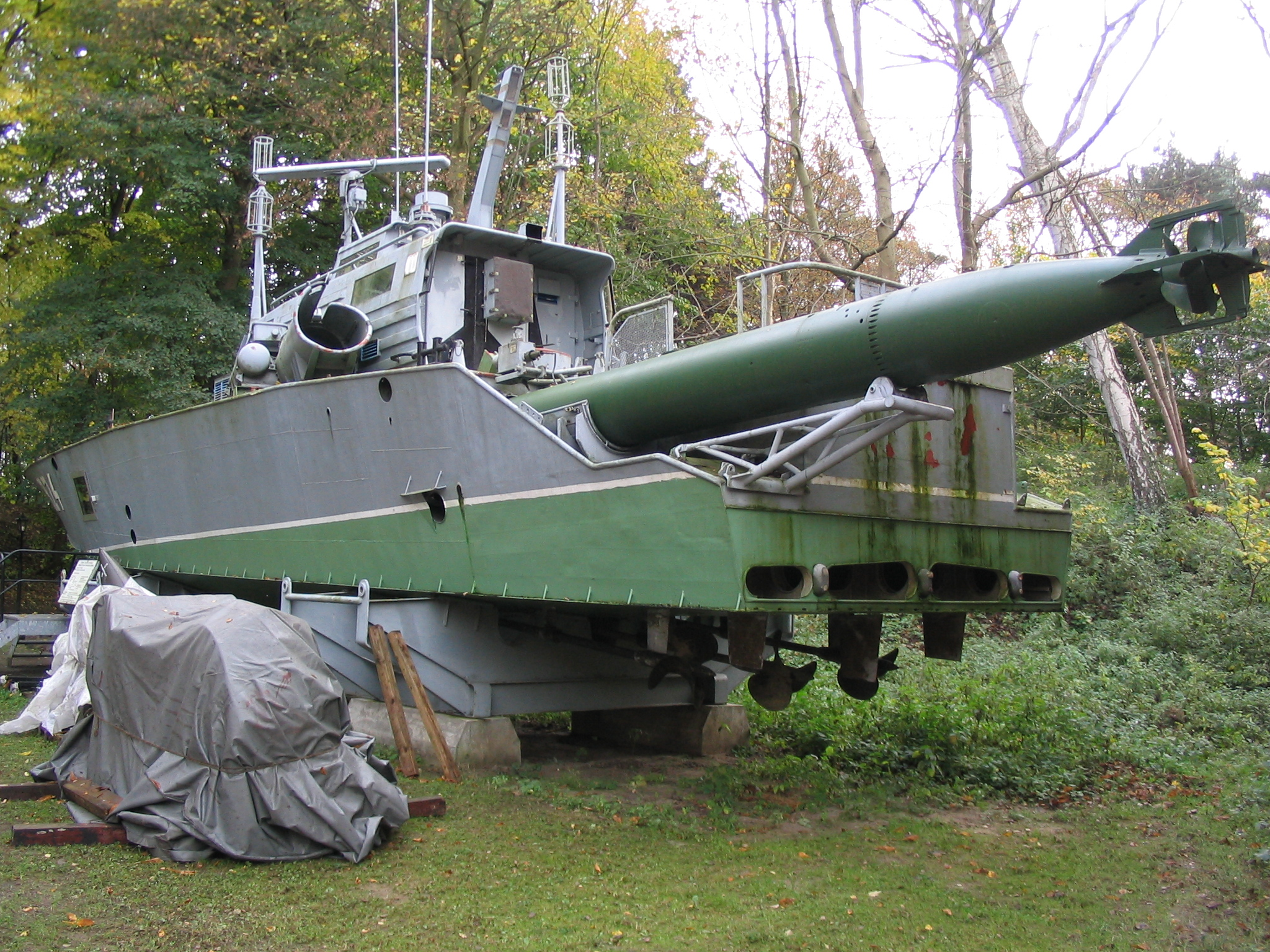
A Project 131 vessel on display at the navy museum in Dänholm near Stralsund

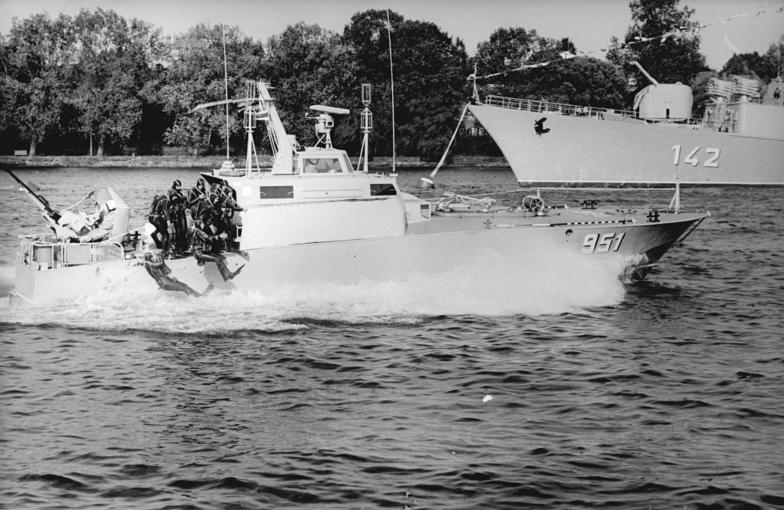
Combat divers being deployed from a Project 131 during a demonstration in Rostock, 1979

== Setup ==
The Libelle class was based on a welded metal hull, housing a fuel tank and a total of three Soviet M-50F4 diesel engines, one to the rear and two to the front. The hull also contained one 533 mm torpedo tube on each side. Vessels of Project 131 carried no reloads for the torpedo tubes. The torpedo boats were designed for short ranges only and were meant to operate from floating bases (projects 62 and 162), anchored close to their area of operation. Each Project 131 boat had a small compartment in the bow to accommodate the crew for some time.

On the deck, there was a pilothouse with four seats and an elevated seat in the center for the helmsman. On both sides of the pilothouse, removable ejectors for sea mines could be mounted. On the aft deck, a rear facing ZU-23-2 23 mm gun was mounted for air defence. The torpedoes were ejected to the rear, but faced forward, so that they were initially following the boat's course after hitting the water.

== Production and service ==
30 boats were built in Rechlin and equipped in the Peene-Werft between 1974 and 1977.

The 30 boats were not given any names, but had the numbers 131.401 to 131.430 assigned to them. One was lost in a collision off Hiddensee in 1986, the others were retired around 1989, with four boats being preserved.
