= Felix Scheffler =

East German navy officer (1915–1986)

- Born: 9 February 1915; Hamburg, German Empire
- Died: 13 March 1986 (aged 71); Rostock, East Germany
- Military career
- Allegiance: Nazi Germany; East Germany
- Branch: Wehrmacht; Volksmarine
- Service years: 1950-1975
- Rank: Konteradmiral
- Commands: People's Navy (Volksmarine)
- Awards: Patriotic Order of Merit in Gold

Felix Scheffler (9 February 1915, in Hamburg, Germany – 13 March 1986, in Rostock, East Germany) was a World War II Wehrmacht veteran, Konteradmiral, and first Chief of the East German People's Navy (Volksmarine).

== Life ==
Felix Scheffler was born into a working family. His father was employed as a clerk and his mother worked as a cleaner. After leaving school, between 1930 and 1933 Felix Schaeffler undertook an apprenticeship as a pharmacist in Altona, which at this time was still administratively separate from nearby Hamburg.

In 1932/33 Scheffler was a member of the Nazi Sturmabteilung. From 1933 to 1937, Scheffler was a seafarer. From 1937 to 1941, he served as a Sergeant in the German Wehrmacht. Captured by the Red Army he was held in captivity from 1941 to 1947. Scheffler joined the National Committee for a Free Germany (NKFD) in 1943. From 1944 to 1945, he participated in the partisan movement in Belarus. He was part of a special intelligence unit of the German anti-fascists under the name "Group-117", which operated in the Lipichansk Forest. This group also included Hugh Bars, Carl Rinagel, and Herbert Geynchke. In 1945 Scheffler fought for the Soviet NKVD against Polish partisans.

Scheffler returned to what was left of Germany in November 1947, not returning to Hamburg, but settling in the Soviet occupation zone which was in the process of being transformed into the German Democratic Republic (East Germany). From 1947 to 1948, he was the directorate secretary for the Socialist Unity Party of Germany (SED) party school in Kleinmachnow. From 1948 to 1950, he was a member of the Democratic Farmers' Party of Germany (DBD) serving as the organizational secretary. He rejoined the SED in 1950.

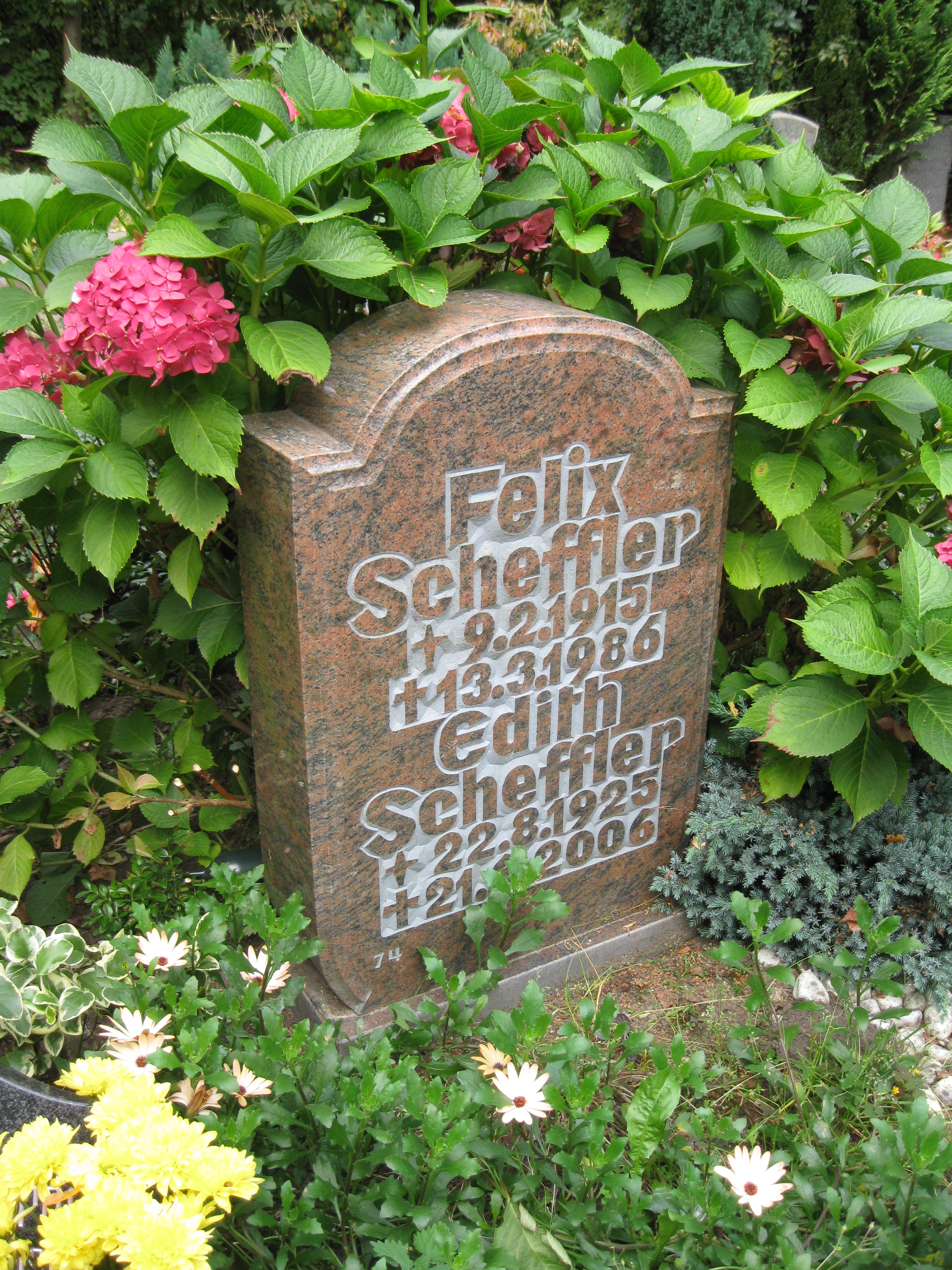
Felix Scheffler's Gravesite at the Neuer Friedhof in Rostock

In 1950 Scheffler joined the People's Police Sea (Volkspolizei See) the forerunner of the People's Navy (Volksmarine). From 1950 to 1954, he was deputy director of the People's Police Sea (Volkspolizei See) command. On 1 October 1952 he was appointed as Konteradmiral. He was appointed as the Chief of the People's Police Sea (Volkspolizei See) in 1955, and for a brief period from 1 March 1956 to 31 December 1956 he served as Chief of the People's Navy (Volksmarine). From 1955 to 1975, he served in various leading positions in the People's Navy (Volksmarine). He attended the Soviet Voroshilov Naval Academy in Leningrad from 1957 to 1959. In 1959, he became the Deputy Chief of the People's Navy (Seestreitkräfte/Volksmarine)(Deputy for Education, 1959–1961; Deputy for Technology, 1962–63 and 1964–1975 the Chief of Rear Services). He retired from the Volksmarine on 1 March 1975.

Preceded by None	Chief of the Volksmarine - German Democratic Republic; 1956–1956	Succeeded by Waldemar Verner
