= Friedrich Elchlepp =

German admiral (1924–2002)

- Born: 4 July 1924; Biederitz, Weimar Republic
- Died: 2 March 2002 (aged 77) Rostock, Germany
- Allegiance: East Germany; Nazi Germany
- Branch: Volksmarine; Kriegsmarine
- Service years: 1950-1984; 1941-1945
- Rank: Konteradmiral (Rear Admiral)
- Conflicts: World War Two; Battle of the Atlantic
- Awards: Patriotic Order of Merit in Silver
- Education: University of Halle

Friedrich Elchlepp (4 July 1924 in Biederitz, Jerichower district, Germany – 2 March 2002 in Germany) was an Oberleutnant zur See in Nazi Germany's Kriegsmarine, a lawyer and a Konteradmiral (Rear Admiral) in East Germany's (Volksmarine) (People's Navy).

== Early life ==
His father was a teacher. Elchlepp served in the Kriegsmarine from 1941 to 1945. obtaining the rank of Oberleutnant zur See. He served aboard a small picket boat on the Bay of Biscay and later became a watch officer on U-boat U-3514. His U-boat surrendered to British forces in Norway in 1945 and he became a British prisoner of war. He briefly served as a watch officer aboard one of the German Mine Sweeping Administration’s auxiliary minesweepers. He returned home to the Soviet Zone of Occupation and joined the Socialist Unity Party of Germany in 1946. From 1946 to 1949, he was a student at the University of Halle. In 1949 he became a member of the Free German Trade Union (FDGB) in Saxony. Elchlepp passed the state law exam and was employed by the provincial government of Brandenburg from 1949 to 1950, as director of the Administration School at Königswusterhausen.

== East German Navy service ==
On 28 February 1950 he joined the East German maritime police forces. From 1950 to 1951, he was a department head in the Seepolizei (Sea Police) command with the grade of Inspector. From 1951 to 1953, Elchlepp was head of Fleet Base East, Wolgast, Peenemünde. From 1953 to 1954, he served as the head of the Operational Staff of the Volkspolizei See (People’s Police Sea). From 1954 to 1956 he was the acting Chief of Staff of the Volkspolizei See. From 1 March 1956 to 30 June 1956 he was Chief of Staff of Volkspolizei See. Elchlepp attended the Soviet Naval War Academy in Leningrad from 1956 to 1957. From 1958 to 1960 he served as the deputy commander for training of the Sea Officer School at Stralsund. From 1960 to 1981, he served as the Sea Damage Commissioner of the German Democratic Republic working from the Volksmarine (People’s Navy) command. From 1981 to 1984 He served as the Sea Commissioner of the German Democratic Republic.

His awards include the Fatherland Order of Merit (Vaterländischer Verdienstorden) in Silver and the Kampforden “Für Verdienste um Volk und Vaterland” (Battle Order “For Merit to the People and Fatherland”) in Gold.

Elchlepp retired from the Volksmarine on 30 November 1984.
