= Volksmarine =

Naval force of East Germany

People's Navy Volksmarine
- Insignia of the Volksmarine
- Active: 1 March 1956 – 2 October 1990
- Country: East Germany
- Branch: Ministry of National Defence
- Type: Navy
- Role: Coastal defence Anti-submarine warfare
- Size: 27,000
- Part of: National People's Army
- Headquarters: Rostock
- March: Präsentiermarsch der Volksmarine (Demonstration March of the People's Navy)
- Engagements: Cold War
- Decorations: See article

Commanders
- Commanders: See list: Felix Scheffler, (1956) Waldemar Verner, (1957–1959) Wilhelm Ehm, (1959–1961),(1963–1987) Heinz Neukirchen, (1961–1963) Theodor Hoffmann, (1987–1989) Hendrik Born (1989–1990)

Insignia
- Naval ensign (warships) (1960–1990)

- Naval ensign (auxiliary ships) (1960-1990)

- Naval jack (1960–1990)

Cap of an officer of the Volksmarine (with cap cover), 1962

The Volksmarine (VM, German pronunciation: [ˈfɔlksmaˌʁiːne]; English: People's Navy) was the naval force of the German Democratic Republic (GDR) from 1956 to 1990. The Volksmarine was one of the service branches of the National People's Army and primarily performed a coastal defence role along the GDR's Baltic Sea coastline and territorial waters.

Disbanded one day before the official reunification of Germany, the Volksmarine served as the naval arm of the East German state for 34 years. Rostock, former home port and headquarters of the Volksmarine, houses Navy Command for the post-reunification Deutsche Marine.

== History ==
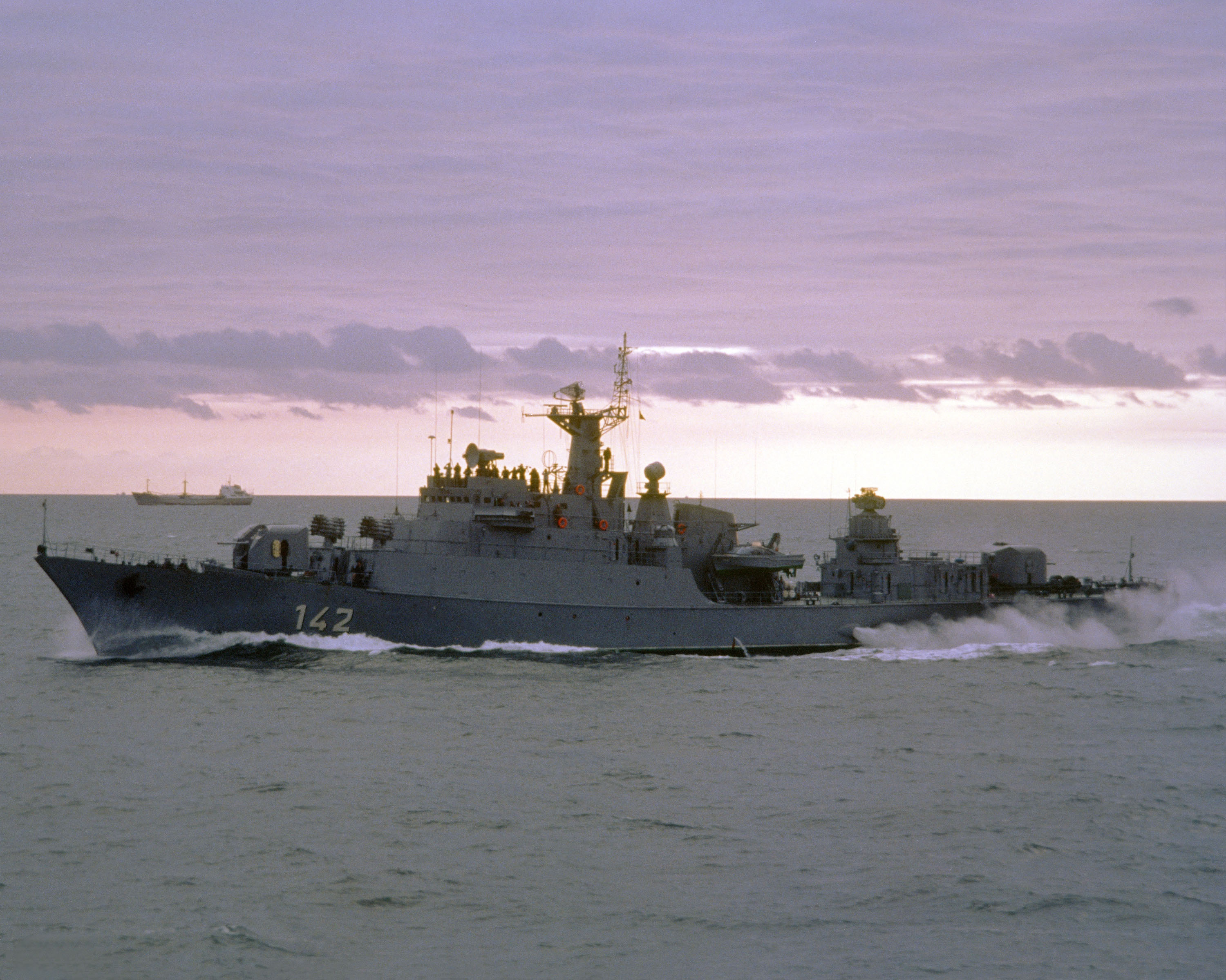
Koni-class frigate Berlin-Haupstadt der DDR underway on 1 October 1985, observing NATO ships participating in "Exercise BALTOPS '85"

Soon after the end of World War II and the beginning of the Cold War, the Soviet Union initiated the rearming of the German Democratic Republic (GDR), which had been founded in October 1949 as a satellite state from the Soviet Zone of Occupation. Beginning in 1950, Soviet Navy officers helped to establish the Hauptverwaltung Seepolizei (Main Administration Sea Police), which was renamed Volkspolizei–See (VP–See) (People's Police – Sea) on 1 July 1952. At the same time parts of the erstwhile maritime police were reorganized into the new Grenzpolizei–See (Border Police –– Sea), to guard the sea frontiers, and incorporated into the Deutsche Grenzpolizei (German Border Police) that had been set up in 1946. By 1952 the VP–See is estimated to have numbered some 8,000 personnel.

On 1 March 1956, the GDR formally created its armed forces, the National People's Army (Nationale Volksarmee, NVA), and the VP–See became the Verwaltung Seestreitkräfte der NVA (Maritime Forces Administration of the NVA) with about 10,000 men. In November 1960, these maritime forces of the National People's Army were officially designated Volksmarine (People's Navy). Over the next years the navy gradually received a number of new ships, mostly built in the GDR. Only the coastal protection ships and some of the fast torpedo boats were provided by the Soviet Union, as were all helicopters, and some auxiliary craft were purchased from Poland.

Following the erection of the Berlin Wall on 13 August 1961, the Grenzbrigade Küste der Grenzpolizei (GBK) (Coastal Border Brigade of the Border Police) was incorporated into the Volksmarine. With the reorganization of 1965 all attack forces, i.e., the fast torpedo boats, were combined into a single flotilla (the 6th Flotilla) and stationed on the Bug peninsula of the island of Rügen. In the 1970s, the Volksmarine had grown to about 18,000 men. In the 1980s some of the ships were replaced and the Volksmarine acquired Soviet-built fighter-bombers.

Although trained and oriented for a confrontation with NATO, the Volksmarine dealt with a sharp upswing in tensions with the Polish People's Republic, officially an ally, in the mid-to-late 1980s. From 1985 to 1989, the Volksmarine was involved in approximately 180 reported incidents due to a maritime border dispute with Poland in the Bay of Pomerania; in subsequent negotiations about two thirds of the disputed maritime area were allocated to the GDR.

=== Reunification & disbandment ===
The Volksmarine was dissolved, like all other branches of the former National People's Army, on 2 October 1990 – the day before the official reunification of Germany. Some of its staff was absorbed into the Bundesmarine (which was henceforth called the Deutsche Marine), some by the German Border Police. Most of the ships and other equipment were scrapped or sold; about one third of the ships went to the Indonesian Navy. Few if any former Volksmarine vessels remain in service with the modern-day German Navy. The last commander of the Volksmarine, Vizeadmiral Hendrik Born, wrote a multi-paragraph commentary for Dieter Flohr and Peter Seemann's 2009 book, Die Volksmarine, a comprehensive and picture-oriented history of the Volksmarine.

=== Surviving vessels ===
One former Volksmarine ship, the Tarantul-class corvette Hans Beimler (575), formerly in commission from 1986 to 1990, survives at Peenemunde as a museum ship.

== Operative tasks ==
The Volksmarine was first and foremost a coastal defence force, but offensive action and amphibious assaults against NATO were also included in its training and plans. It was operationally incorporated into the United Baltic Sea Fleets of the Warsaw Pact states, intended to serve alongside them in the event of war. Its designated area of operations was the Baltic Sea and the entrances to the Baltic Sea. If open warfare had erupted between the Warsaw Pact and NATO, the primary mission of the Volksmarine was to keep the sea lanes open for Soviet reinforcements and to participate in offensive actions against the coasts of hostile nations in the Baltic Sea. For these purposes, it was equipped with light forces such as anti-submarine ships, fast torpedo boats, minesweepers as well as landing craft. Routine duty was heavily focused on extensive reconnaissance activities, carried out mainly by the minesweepers and specialized electronic surveillance boats.

The 6th Border Brigade (Coast) had a special responsibility for the prevention of "Republikflucht" (people leaving the GDR without official permission). With effect from 1 November 1961, it was subordinated to the Volksmarine. It had a substantial number of small patrol boats and surveillance posts along the coast.

== Chief of the People's Navy ==
Known as Chef der Volksmarine (Chief of the People's Navy), a total of 6 men led the East German naval service from 1956 to 1990.

- Konteradmiral Felix Scheffler (1 March 1956 – 31 December 1956)
- Vizeadmiral Waldemar Verner (1 January 1957 – 31 July 1959)
- Konteradmiral Wilhelm Ehm (1 August 1959 – 31 July 1961, 25 February 1963 – 30 November 1987)
- Konteradmiral Heinz Neukirchen (1 August 1961 – 24 February 1963)
- Vizeadmiral Theodor Hoffmann (1 December 1987 – 17 November 1989)
- Vizeadmiral Hendrik Born (11 December 1989 – 2 October 1990)

== Organization ==
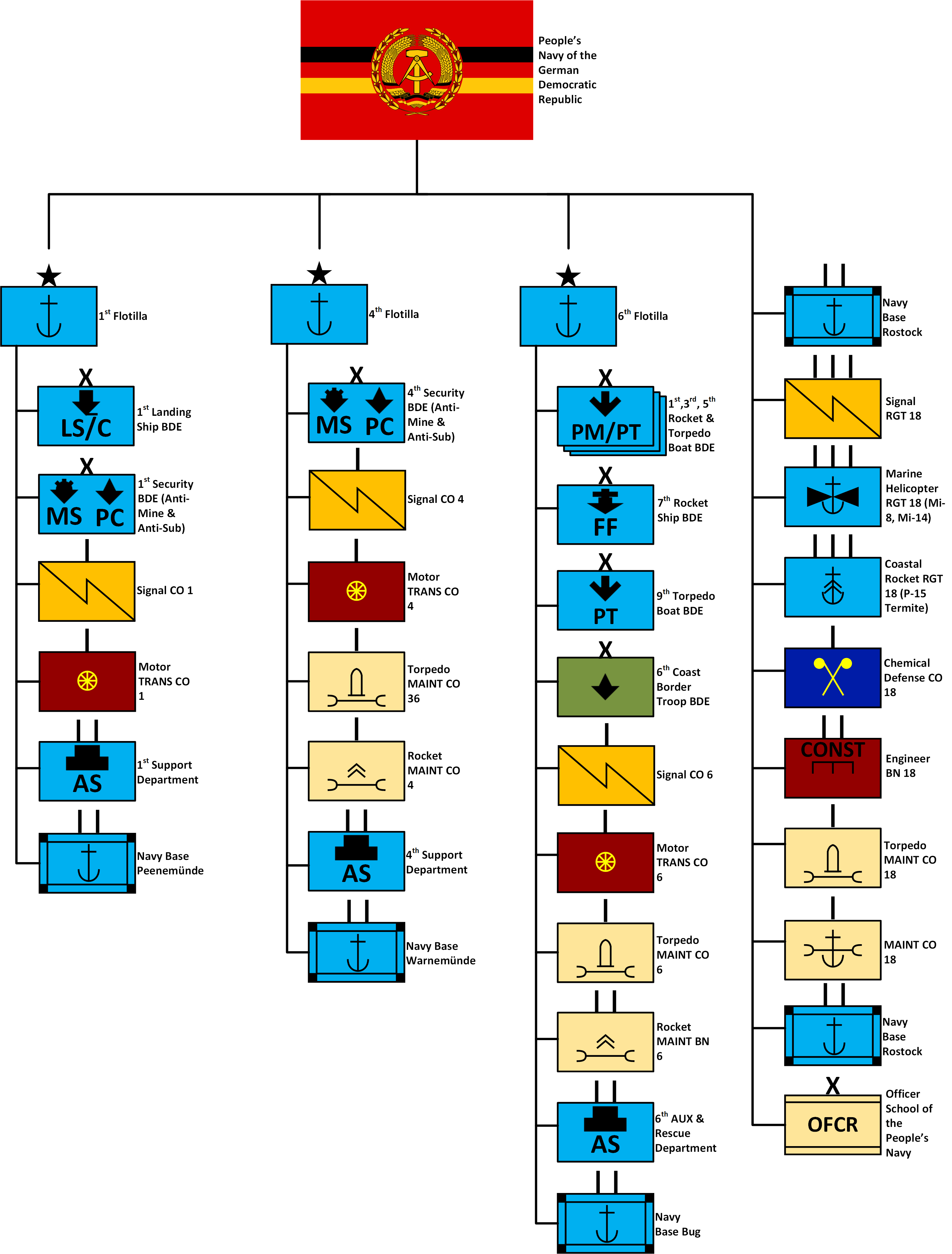
Organization of the Volksmarine in 1988

The Volksmarine was headed by the Kommando der Volksmarine (People's Navy HQ Command) in Rostock-Gehlsdorf. It was structured as follows (in 1985):

- 1st Flotilla in Peenemünde,
- 4th Flotilla in Rostock-Warnemünde,
- 6th Flotilla at Bug on Rügen Island,
- 6th Border Brigade (Coast) in Rostock.

Shore-based forces consisted of:

- one Torpedo Technical Support Company (TTK-18) in Sassnitz (servicing anti-submarine torpedoes)
- one Naval Helicopter Wing (MHG-18) in Parow near Stralsund
- one Naval Flight Wing (MFG-28) in Laage
- one Navy Engineering Battalion (MPiB-18) in Sassnitz
- one Combat Swimmer Command (KSK-18) in Kühlungsborn
- one Coastal Missile Regiment (Ground Support) (KRR-18) in Schwarzenpfost
- one Coastal Defense Regiment (Ground Support) (KVR-18) in Rostock (from 1988)
- one Naval Propaganda Company (PRK-18) in Rostock-Warnemünde
- the Maritime Hydrographic Service of the GDR (SHD) in Rostock

== Training facilities ==
- Naval Officers Academy "Karl Liebknecht" in Stralsund (training of naval officers)
- Naval NCO Academy "Walter Steffens" in Parow (naval training of NCOs and seamen)
- NCO School for Support Services at Dänholm near Stralsund (technical training of NCOs)

== Equipment ==
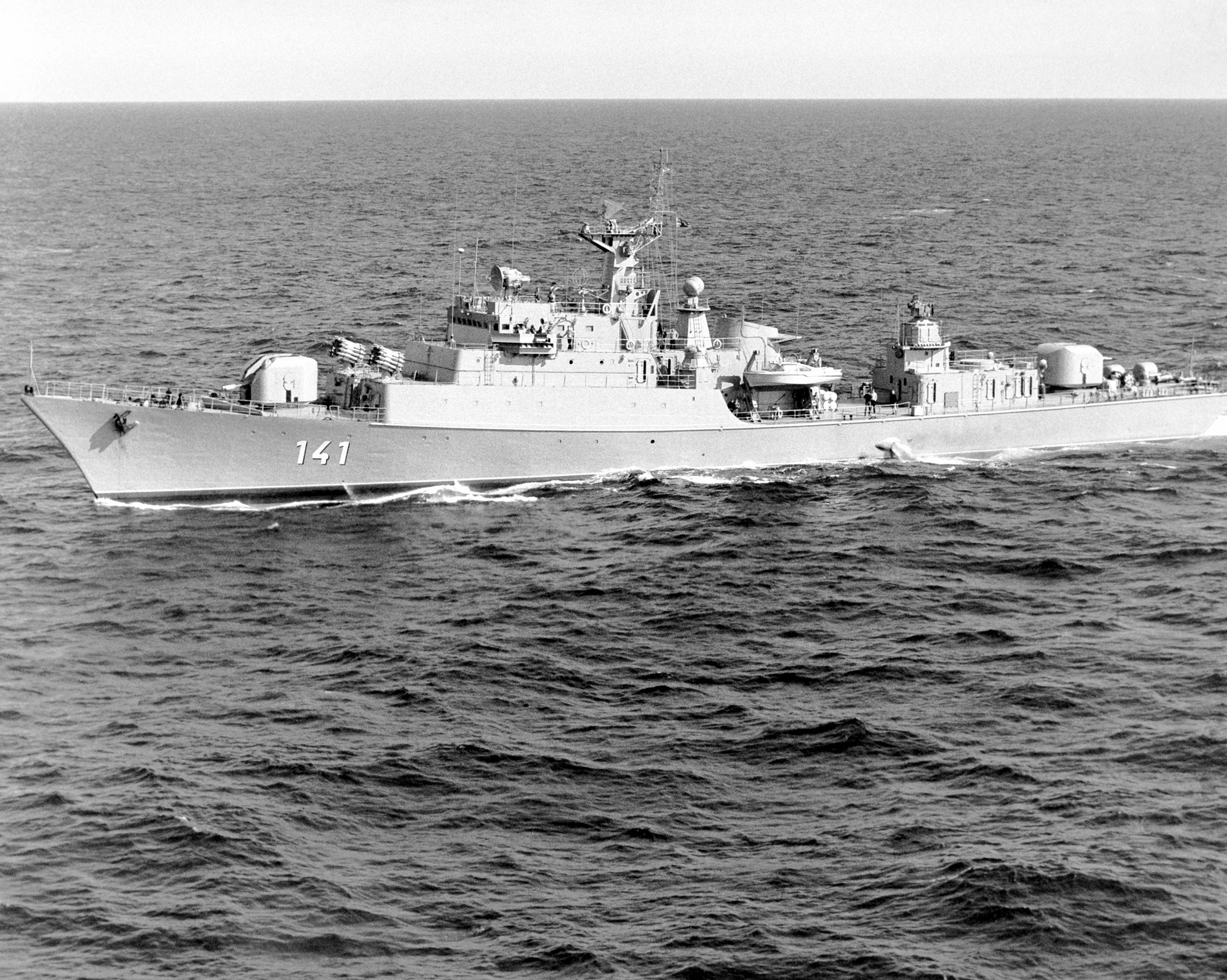
Koni-class frigate Rostock

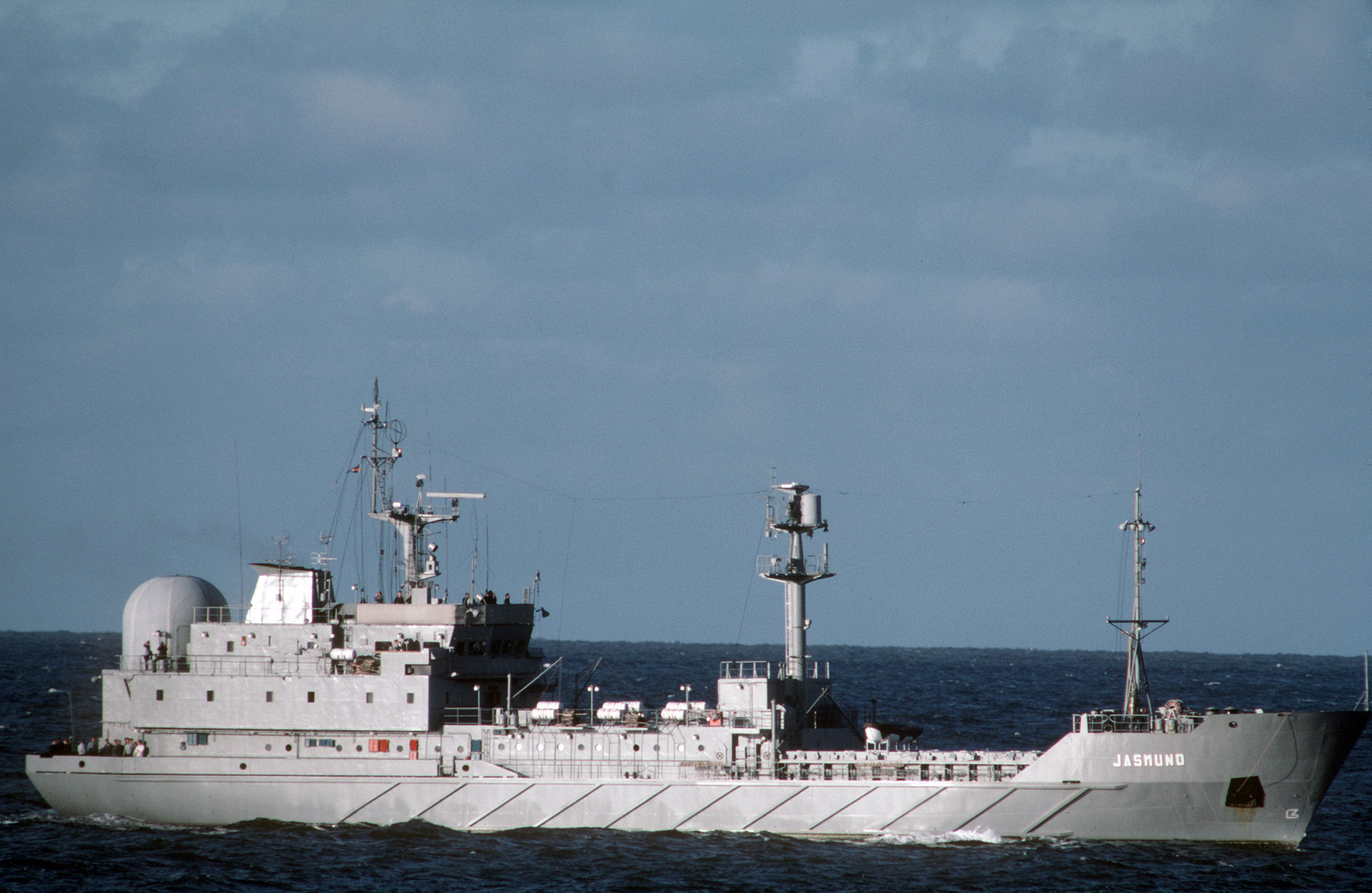
Intelligence ship Jasmund

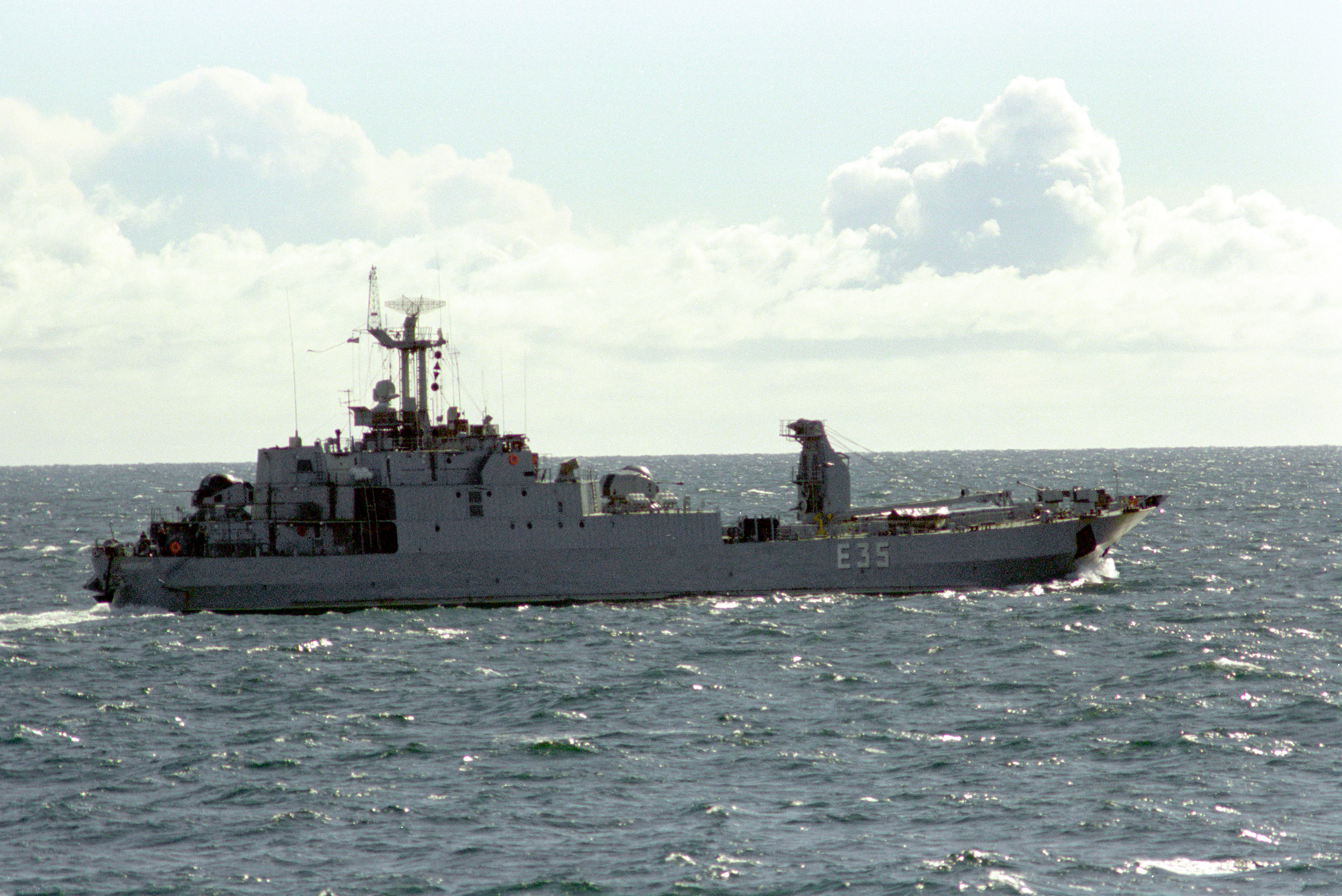
Frosch II-class support ship Nordperd

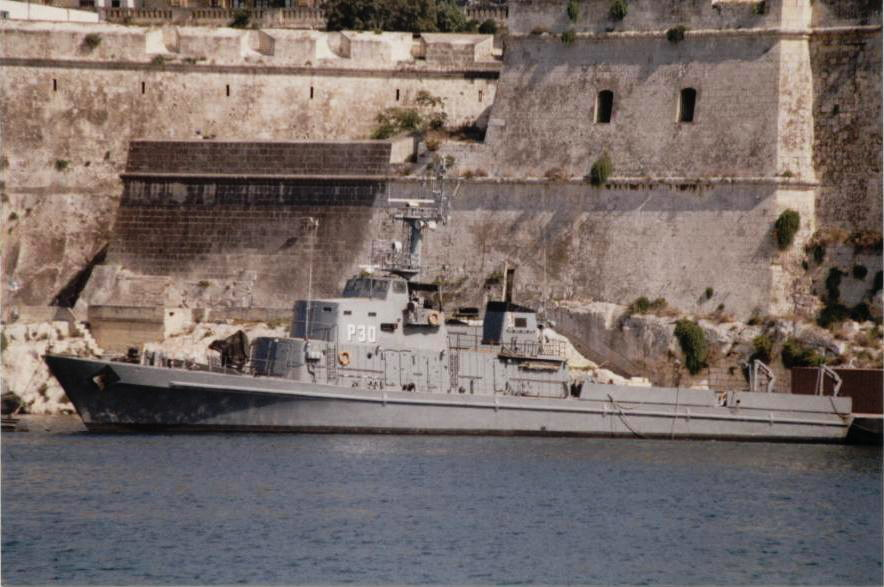
Kondor-class minesweeper Ueckermuende (transferred to Malta as P30)

=== Surface fleet ===
The Volksmarine surface fleet was built around its core missions: coastal defense, anti-submarine warfare, and supporting the Soviet Navy in conducting amphibious assaults if called upon. Volksmarine vessels accordingly were generally focused on speed and mobility, and unlike their Bundesmarine counterparts in West Germany (which maintained submarines in its fleet from 1960 onward), the Volksmarine never commissioned any submarines.

Given East Germany's close military, economic and political ties with the Soviet Union, many Volksmarine vessels originated there, but some, like the Libelle-class torpedo boats and Kondor-class minesweepers, were entirely East German designs.

Throughout its 34 years, the Volksmarine surface fleet consisted of:

- Frigates
  - Koni-class: Rostock (141), Berlin- Haupstadt der DDR (142), and Halle (143))
  - Riga-class: Ernst Thälmann, Karl Marx, Karl Liebknecht, Friedrich Engels
- Corvettes
  - Parchim-class
  - Tarantul-class: Albin Köbis (571), Rudolf Egelhofer (572), Fritz Globig (573), Paul Eisenschneider (574), Hans Beimler (575)
- Fast torpedo and missile boats
  - P 6-class, Shershen-class, Libelle-class, Osa-class
- Landing craft
  - Frosch-class
- Minelayers and minesweepers
  - Kondor-class
- Coastal defense ships
- Submarine hunters
- Intelligence ships
- Training ships
- Support craft

=== Naval aviation ===
East German naval aviation capabilities were modest, with all fixed-wing and rotary assets based ashore.

- Three squadrons of combat helicopters: Mil Mi-4MÄ Hound, Mil Mi-8 Hip, Mi-14PL Haze-A, and Mil Mi-14BT Haze-B
- Fighter-bombers: Sukhoi Su-22M4 Fitter-K

== Music ==
The People's Navy's band played a number of specially-composed musical pieces:

- "Präsentiermarsch der Volksmarine" ("Demonstration March of the People's Navy"), composed by Kapitän zur See Ludwig Schmidt for use at ceremonial events.
- "Flottenparade" ("Fleet Parade"), composed by Ludwig Schmidt for use at parades
- "Unsere Volksmarine" ("Our People's Navy") for use at parades
- "Matrosen von Kronstadt" ("Sailors of Kronstadt") was an East German adaptation of the 1926 Soviet Navy song "Forward, Red Marines" composed by K. Korchmarev (music) and with lyrics written by Aleksandr Bezymensky; German lyrics were written by Ernst Busch

The musical pieces written for the Volksmarine fell out of use after the reunification of Germany, and are not used by the modern German Navy.

== Volksmarine admirals ==
Flag of chief of the Volksmarine

There were 37 admirals in the history of the Volksmarine and its predecessor organizations. They were:

=== Admiral ===
- Waldemar Verner
- Wilhelm Ehm
- Theodor Hoffmann

=== Vizeadmiral ===
- Hendrik Born
- Bruno Wansierski
- Gustav Hesse
- Heinz Neukirchen
- William Nordin
- Günter Kutzschebauch
- Hans Hofmann

=== Konteradmiral ===
- Felix Scheffler
  Simple Logo of the VM
- Richard Fischer
- John Streubel
- Rudi Wegner
- Heinz Irmscher
- Lothar Heinecke
- Heinrich Jordt
- Walter Kühn
- Werner Henninger
- Klaus Kahnt
- Hans-Joachim Dönitz
- Joachim Münch
- Wolfgang Laue
- Hans Heß
- Werner Kotte
- Rolf Rödel
- Herbert Städtke
- Günther Pöschel
- Helmut Milzow
- Friedrich Elchlepp
- Eberhard Grießbach
- Egon Nitz
- Dr. Karl Weiß
- Hans Partzsch
- Herbert Bernig
- Gerhard Müller
- Peter Miethe
