= Admiral (Germany) =

Rank in the German Navy

Admiral Admiral
- Shoulder and sleeve insignia
- Country: Germany
- Service branch: German Navy
- Abbreviation: Adm
- Rank group: Flag officer
- NATO rank code: OF-9
- Pay grade: B10
- Next lower rank: Vizeadmiral
- Equivalent ranks: General

Admiral, short Adm, (German: Admiral, pronounced [ˌatmiˈʁaːl]) is the most senior flag officer rank in the German Navy. It is equivalent to general in the German Army or German Air Force. In the Central Medical Services there is no equivalent. In the German Navy Admiral is, as in many navies, a four-star rank with a NATO code of OF-9. The most recent officer of the German Navy to hold the rank is Admiral Joachim Rühle, who serves as Chief of Staff, Supreme Headquarters Allied Powers Europe (SHAPE) in Mons, Belgium since 2020.

However, in other German speaking naval forces, e.g. Imperial German Navy, Reichsmarine, Kriegsmarine, Volksmarine, and the Austro-Hungarian K.u.K. Kriegsmarine, admiral was an OF-8 three-star flag officer rank.

== Address ==
The official manner of formal addressing of military people with the rank Admiral (OF-9) is "Herr/Frau Admiral". However, as to German naval traditions the addressing in seamen's language of military people with any flag officer rank (OF-6 to OF-9) is "Herr/Frau Admiral". In the Imperial German Navy, an admiral would be addressed as "Eure Exzellenz" (Your Excellency)

== Rank insignia and rating ==
Its rank insignia, worn on the sleeves and shoulders, are one five-pointed star above a big gold stripe and three normal stripes (without the star when rank loops are worn).

The rank is rated OF-9 in NATO, and equivalent to general in Heer, and Luftwaffe. It is grade B10 in the pay rules of the Federal Ministry of Defence.

== History ==
=== German navies until 1945 ===
Admiral as a rank first appeared in Germany in the 19th century and was expanded in the early 20th century as part of a build-up and mobilization in preparation for the First World War. The rank again saw a resurgence during the Second World War.

=== National People's Army ===
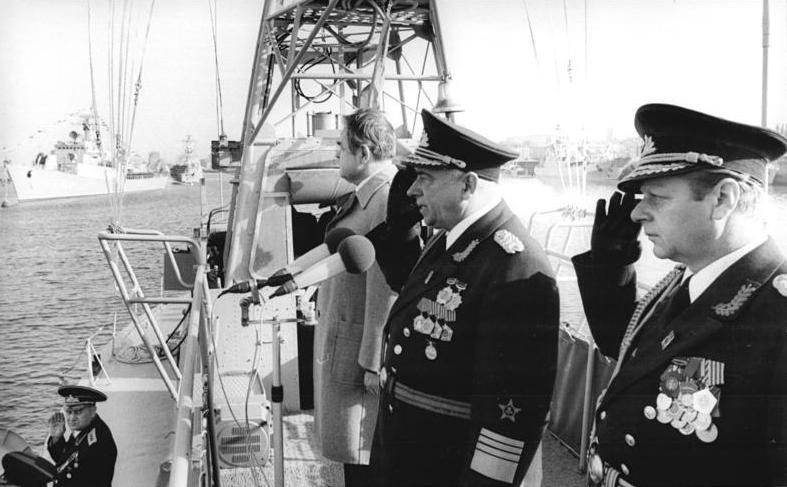
GDR-Admiral Wilhelm Ehm and Vizeadmiral Gustav Hesse (1979)

Admiral was the second highest flag officer grade of the Volksmarine, equivalent to the three-star rank Generaloberst.

In the GDR Volksmarine there have been the three flag officer ranks Konteradmiral, Vizeadmiral, and Admiral. By decision of the GDR State Council from March 25, 1982, the rank Flottenadmiral was introduced.

== Insignia ==
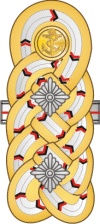
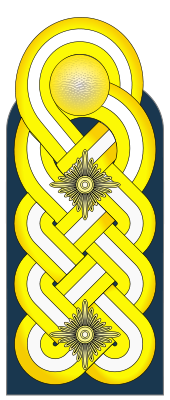
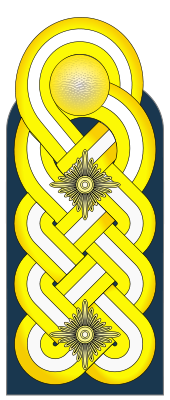
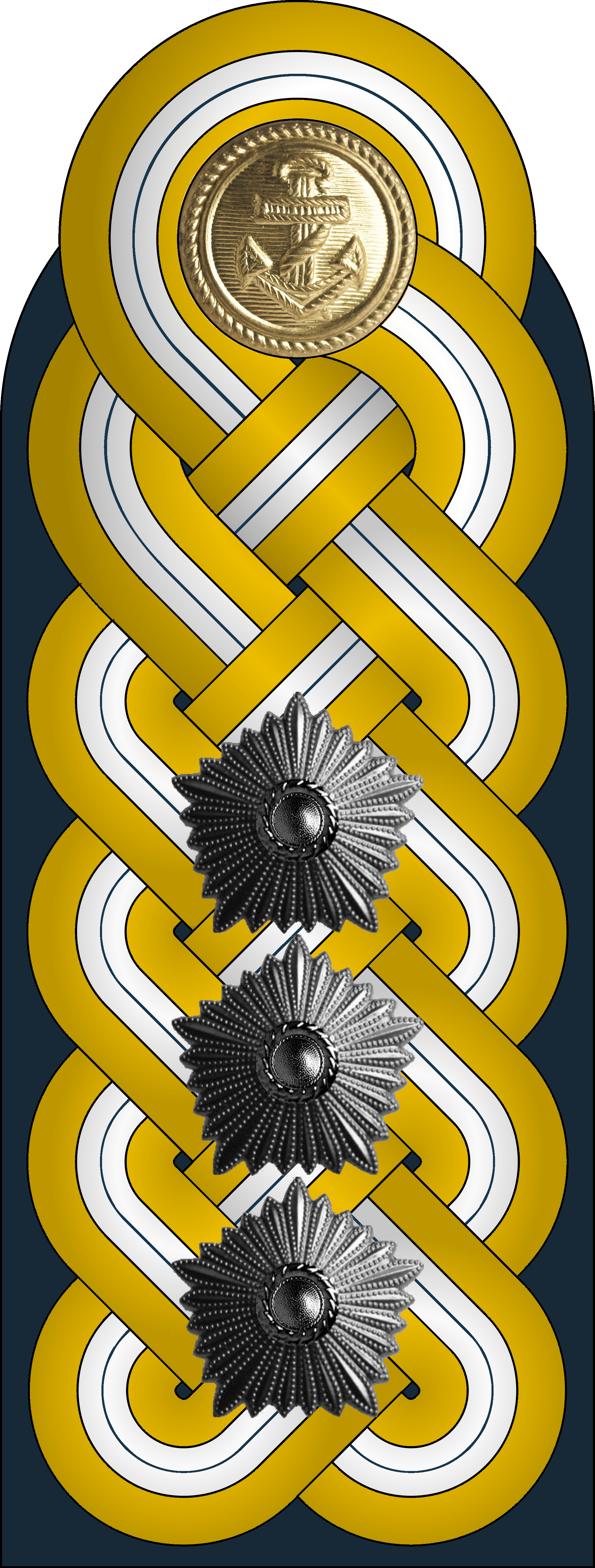
| Insignia | Shoulder | Sleeve | Rank flag | Higher/lower rank |
|---|---|---|---|---|
| Imperial German Navy | | | | Großadmiral Vizeadmiral |
| Reichsmarine | | | | None Vizeadmiral |
| Kriegsmarine | | | | Generaladmiral Vizeadmiral |
| Volksmarine | | | | Flottenadmiral Vizeadmiral |
| German Navy | | | | None Vizeadmiral |

== See also ==
- List of German admirals
