= Vizeadmiral =

Rank in the German Navy

Vizeadmiral (German pronunciation: [ˈfiːtsəʔatmiˌʁaːl, ˈvi-]; abbreviated VAdm) is a senior naval flag officer rank in several German-speaking countries, equivalent to Vice admiral.

== Austria-Hungary ==
In the Austro-Hungarian Navy there were the flag-officer ranks Kontreadmiral (also spelled Konteradmiral in the 20th century), Viceadmiral, and Admiral, as well as Großadmiral.

K.u.K. Kriegsmarinerank

Command flag

Cuff title

K.u.K. Konteradmiral

== Belgium ==
In the Belgian Navy, the rank is known as Vizeadmiral (in German), vice-admiraal (in Flemish) and vice-amiral (in French).

== Germany ==
Vice admiral Vizeadmiral
- Shoulder board and mounting loop

- Cuff title
- Country: Germany
- Service branch: German Navy
- Abbreviation: VAdm
- Rank group: Flag officer
- NATO rank code: OF-8
- Pay grade: B8
- Next higher rank: Admiral
- Next lower rank: Konteradmiral
- Equivalent ranks: Generalleutnant

=== Rank insignia and rating ===
Its rank insignia, worn on the sleeves and shoulders, are one five-pointed star above a big gold stripe and two normal ones (without the star when rank loops are worn). It is grade B8 in the pay rules of the Federal Ministry of Defence.

The sequence of ranks (top-down approach) in that particular group is as follows:

- OF-9: Admiral (Germany) / General (Germany)
- OF-8: Vizeadmiral / Generalleutnant
- OF-7: Konteradmiral / Generalmajor
- OF-6: Flottillenadmiral / Brigadegeneral

=== History ===
==== Imperial German Navy and Kriegsmarine ====
In the Kaiserliche Marine and Kriegsmarine, Vizeadmiral was a flag officer rank equivalent to a Heer or Luftwaffe Generalleutnant, and to an SS-Gruppenführer und Generalleutnant of the Waffen-SS.

The rank insignia consisted of shoulder strap and sleeve stripes. Shoulder straps had to be worn on uniform jackets and consisted of twisted gold-braids (one pip or star) on padding in navy blue weapon color.

Cuff insignia consisted of one golden big stripe, two normal stripes, and a five-point naval star above. The sleeve rings encircled the lower cuffs.

==== National People's Army ====
Vizeadmiral was the second lowest flag officer grade of the Volksamarine, equivalent to the Generalleutnant.

In the GDR Volksmarine there were 3 flag officer ranks: Konteradmiral, Vizeadmiral, and Admiral. The GDR State Council decided 25 March 1982 to introduce the rank of Flottenadmiral.

=== Insignia ===
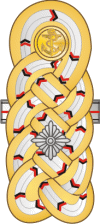
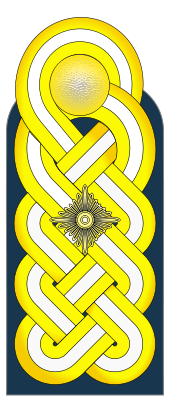
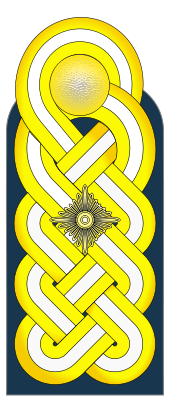
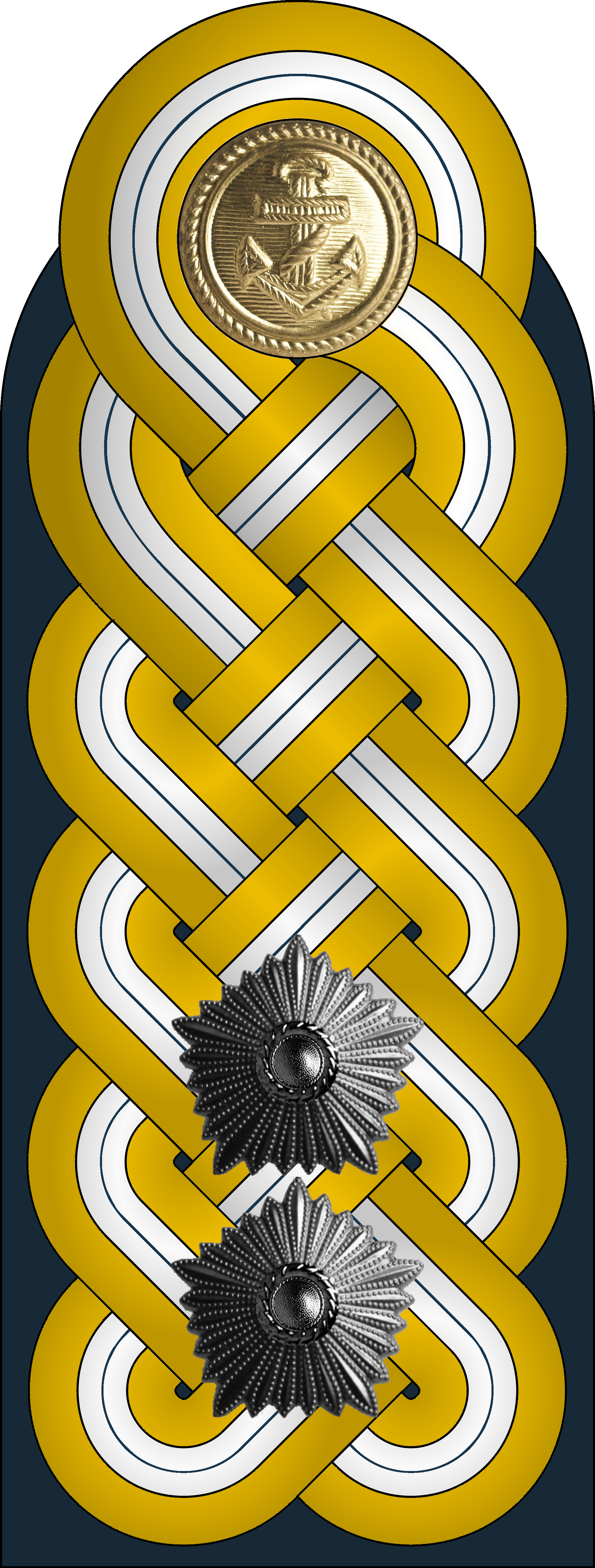
Insignia	Shoulder	Sleeve	Rank flag	Higher/lower rank
Imperial German Navy				Admiral Konteradmiral
Reichsmarine				Admiral Konteradmiral
Kriegsmarine				Admiral Konteradmiral
Volksmarine				Admiral Konteradmiral
German Navy				Admiral Konteradmiral
