= List of Knight's Cross of the Iron Cross recipients of the Kriegsmarine =

The Knight's Cross of the Iron Cross (German: Ritterkreuz des Eisernen Kreuzes) and its variants were the highest awards in the military of the Third Reich. Recipients are grouped by grades of the Knight's Cross. During or shortly after World War II, 318 German sailors and servicemen of the Kriegsmarine received the Knight's Cross of the Iron Cross. Of these, 316 presentations were formally made. Two recipients received the award after 11 May 1945, when Großadmiral Karl Dönitz ordered a cease of promotions and illegalized subsequent awards. The final two recipients are therefore considered to have received the medal without legal authority.

== Background ==
The Knight's Cross of the Iron Cross and its higher grades were based on four separate enactments. The first enactment, Reichsgesetzblatt I S. 1573 of 1 September 1939 instituted the Iron Cross (Eisernes Kreuz), the Knight's Cross of the Iron Cross and the Grand Cross of the Iron Cross (Großkreuz des Eisernen Kreuzes). Article 2 of the enactment mandated that the award of a higher class be preceded by the award of all preceding classes. As the war progressed, some of the recipients of the Knight's Cross distinguished themselves further and a higher grade, the Knight's Cross of the Iron Cross with Oak Leaves (Ritterkreuz des Eisernen Kreuzes mit Eichenlaub), was instituted. The Oak Leaves, as they were commonly referred to, were based on the enactment Reichsgesetzblatt I S. 849 of 3 June 1940. In 1941, two higher grades of the Knight's Cross were instituted. The enactment Reichsgesetzblatt I S. 613 of 28 September 1941 introduced the Knight's Cross of the Iron Cross with Oak Leaves and Swords (Ritterkreuz des Eisernen Kreuzes mit Eichenlaub und Schwertern) and the Knight's Cross of the Iron Cross with Oak Leaves, Swords and Diamonds (Ritterkreuz des Eisernen Kreuzes mit Eichenlaub, Schwertern und Brillanten). At the end of 1944 the final grade, the Knight's Cross of the Iron Cross with Golden Oak Leaves, Swords, and Diamonds (Ritterkreuz des Eisernen Kreuzes mit goldenem Eichenlaub, Schwertern und Brillanten), based on the enactment Reichsgesetzblatt 1945 I S. 11 of 29 December 1944, became the final variant of the Knight's Cross authorized.

== Recipients ==
The Oberkommando der Wehrmacht kept separate Knight's Cross lists, one for each of the three military branches, Heer (Army), Kriegsmarine (Navy), Luftwaffe (Air force) and for the Waffen-SS. In each of these lists a unique sequential number was assigned to each recipient. The same numbering paradigm was applied to the higher grades of the Knight's Cross, one list per grade.

This along with the * (asterisk) indicates that the Knight's Cross was awarded posthumously.
This along with the ? (question mark) indicates that historian Veit Scherzer has expressed doubt regarding the veracity and formal correctness of the listing.

=== Knight's Cross with Oak Leaves, Swords and Diamonds ===
The Knight's Cross with Oak Leaves, Swords and Diamonds is based on the enactment Reichsgesetzblatt I S. 613 of 28 September 1941 to reward those servicemen who had already been awarded the Oak Leaves with Swords to the Knight's Cross of the Iron Cross. It was awarded to twenty-seven German soldiers, sailors and airmen, ranging from young fighter pilots to field marshals. Two recipients were members of the Kriegsmarine. The list is initially sorted by the chronological number assigned to the recipient.

Number	Name	Rank	Unit	Date of award	Notes
7	Wolfgang Lüth	Korvettenkapitän	commander of U-181	9 August 1943	killed on active service 13 May 1945
22	Albrecht Brandi	Korvettenkapitän	commander of U-967	24 November 1944	

=== Knight's Cross with Oak Leaves and Swords ===
The Knight's Cross with Oak Leaves and Swords is also based on the enactment Reichsgesetzblatt I S. 613 of 28 September 1941 to reward those servicemen who had already been awarded the Oak Leaves to the Knight's Cross of the Iron Cross. The list is initially sorted by the chronological number assigned to the recipient.

Number	Name	Rank	Unit	Date of award	Notes
5	Otto Kretschmer	Korvettenkapitän	commander of U-99	26 December 1941	
17	Erich Topp	Kapitänleutnant	commander of U-552	17 August 1942	
18	Reinhard Suhren	Kapitänleutnant	commander of U-564	1 September 1942	
29	Wolfgang Lüth	Kapitänleutnant	commander of U-181	25 April 1943	Awarded 7th Diamonds 9 August 1943
66	Albrecht Brandi	Kapitänleutnant	commander of U-380	9 May 1944	Awarded 22nd Diamonds 24 November 1944

=== Knight's Cross with Oak Leaves ===
The Knight's Cross with Oak Leaves was based on the enactment Reichsgesetzblatt I S. 849 of 3 June 1940. The last officially announced number for the Oak Leaves was 843. Higher numbers are unofficial and therefore denoted in brackets. The list is initially sorted by the chronological number assigned to the recipient.

Number	Name	Rank	Unit	Date of award	Notes
5	Günther Prien	Kapitänleutnant	commander of U-47	20 October 1940	Missing in action 7 March 1941
6	Otto Kretschmer	Kapitänleutnant	commander of U-99	4 November 1940	Awarded 5th Swords 26 December 1941
7	Joachim Schepke	Kapitänleutnant	commander of U-100	1 December 1940	Killed in action 17 March 1941
13	Heinrich Liebe	Kapitänleutnant	commander of U-38	10 June 1941	at the same time promoted to Korvettenkapitän
14	Engelbert Endrass	Oberleutnant zur See	commander of U-46	10 June 1941	Killed in action 21 December 1941
15	Herbert Schultze	Kapitänleutnant	commander of U-48	12 June 1941	
23	Viktor Hermann Otto Schütze	Korvettenkapitän	commander of U-103	14 July 1941	
40	Ernst-Felix Krüder	Kapitän zur See	commander of auxiliary cruiser Pinguin (HSK-5)	15 November 1941*	Killed in action 8 May 1941
45	Bernhard Rogge	Kapitän zur See	commander of auxiliary cruiser Atlantis (HSK-2)	31 December 1941	
51	Heinrich Lehmann-Willenbrock	Kapitänleutnant	commander of U-96	31 December 1941	
56	Reinhard Suhren	Oberleutnant zur See	commander of U-564	31 December 1941	Awarded 18th Swords 1 September 1942
87	Erich Topp	Kapitänleutnant	commander of U-552	11 April 1942	Awarded 17th Swords 17 August 1942
89	Reinhard Hardegen	Kapitänleutnant	commander of U-123	23 April 1942	
104	Rolf Mützelburg	Kapitänleutnant	commander of U-203	15 July 1942	Killed on active service 11 September 1942
105	Adalbert Schnee	Kapitänleutnant	commander of U-201	15 July 1942	
123	Klaus Scholtz	Korvettenkapitän	commander of U-108	10 September 1942	
125	Heinrich Bleichrodt	Kapitänleutnant	commander of U-109	23 September 1942	
142	Wolfgang Lüth	Kapitänleutnant	commander of U-181	13 November 1942	Awarded 29th Swords 15 April 1943; 7th Diamonds 9 August 1943
143	Werner Töniges	Kapitänleutnant	commander of Schnellboot S-102 in the 1. Schnellbootsflottille	13 November 1942	
147	Karl-Friedrich Merten	Korvettenkapitän	commander of U-68	16 November 1942	
158	Helmuth von Ruckteschell	Kapitän zur See	commander of auxiliary cruiser Michel (HSK-9)	23 December 1942	
171	Friedrich Guggenberger	Kapitänleutnant	commander of German submarine U-81 (1941)	8 January 1943	
177	Johann Mohr	Kapitänleutnant	commander of U-124	13 January 1943	Killed in action 2 April 1943
208	Georg Lassen	Kapitänleutnant	commander of U-160	7 March 1943	
223	Karl Dönitz	Großadmiral	Oberbefehlshaber der Kriegsmarine	6 April 1943	
224	Albrecht Brandi	Korvettenkapitän	commander of U-617	11 April 1943	Awarded 66th Swords 9 May 1944; 22nd Diamonds 24 November 1944
225	Gerhard von Kamptz	Fregattenkapitän	chief of the 8. Räumbootflottille	14 April 1943	
226	Siegfried Wuppermann	Oberleutnant zur See	commander of Schnellboot S-56 in the 3. Schnellbootflottille (Note: According to Scherzer as commander of Schnellboot S-56.)	14 April 1943	
234	Otto von Bülow	Kapitänleutnant	commander of U-404	26 April 1943	
249	Friedrich Kemnade	Korvettenkapitän	chief of the 3. Schnellbootflottille	27 May 1943	
250	Robert Gysae	Kapitänleutnant	commander of U-177	31 May 1943	
256	Carl Emmermann	Kapitänleutnant	commander of U-172	4 July 1943	
257	Werner Henke	Kapitänleutnant	commander of U-515	4 July 1943	Killed as prisoner of war on 15 June 1944
326	Georg Christiansen	Korvettenkapitän	chief of the 1. Schnellbootflottille	13 November 1943	
330	Dr.-Ing. Karl-Friedrich Brill	Korvettenkapitän of the Reserves	commander of Minenschiff "Juminda" and leader of a Minensuch-Gruppe	18 November 1943*	Killed in action 22 October 1943
361	Bernd-Georg Klug	Korvettenkapitän	chief of the 5. Schnellbootflottille	1 January 1944	
362	Klaus Feldt	Korvettenkapitän	chief of the 2. Schnellbootflottille	1 January 1944	
387	Fritz Breithaupt	Korvettenkapitän of the Reserves	chief of the 24. Minensuchflottille	10 February 1944	Killed in flying accident on 25 December 1944
461	Otto Pollmann	Oberleutnant zur See	commander of U-Jäger 2210	25 April 1944	
499	Rudolf Petersen	Kapitän zur See	Führer der Schnellboote	13 June 1944	
500	Götz Freiherr von Mirbach	Kapitänleutnant	chief of the 9. Schnellbootflottille	14 June 1944	
523	Karl Palmgreen	Korvettenkapitän of the Reserves (Note: According to Scherzer as Korvettenkapitän zur Verwendung (for disposition).)	chief of the 38. Minensuchflottille	11 July 1944	
524	Heinrich Hoffmann	Korvettenkapitän	chief of the 5. Torpedobootflottille	11 July 1944	
577	Richard Seuss	Oberleutnant of the Reserves	chief of the Marine Küstenbatterie "Île de Cézembre" (Marine-Artillerie-Abteilung 608)	2 September 1944	
583	Otto Kähler	Konteradmiral	Seekommandant Festung Brest	15 September 1944	
614	Theodor Krancke	Admiral	commander in chief Marine-Gruppenkommando West	18 October 1944	
645	Werner Hartmann	Kapitän zur See	Führer der U-Boote im Mittelmeer, commander of U-198	5 November 1944	
659	Hans Hoßfeld	Korvettenkapitän	Marine-Artillerie-Abteilung 531	25 November 1944*	Killed in action 19 November 1944
823	Theodor Burchardi	Admiral	Kommandierender Admiral östliche Ostsee	8 April 1945	
824	August Thiele	Vizeadmiral	commander of Kampfgruppe "Thiele"	8 April 1945	
(852)	Rolf Thomsen	Kapitänleutnant	commander of U-1202	29 April 1945	
(853)	Hans-Günther Lange	Kapitänleutnant	commander of U-711	29 April 1945	
(866)	Adalbert von Blanc? (Note: There is no reference that the Oak Leaves were awarded to Adalbert von Blanc in the German Federal Archives. His personal file contains a letter from Admiral August Thiele indicating that von Blanc had been recommended for the Oak Leaves by Thiele. In a file of the German Minenräumdienst dated just after the capitulation is an entry "Knight's Cross of the Iron Cross with Oak Leaves" without indicating a date of the award. The sequential number "866" and date were assigned by the Association of Knight's Cross Recipients (AKCR). Von Blanc was member of the AKCR.)	Fregattenkapitän	Führer 9. Marine-Sicherungs-Division	10 May 1945	

=== Knight's Cross of the Iron Cross ===
The Knight's Cross of the Iron Cross is based on the enactment Reichsgesetzblatt I S. 1573 of 1 September 1939 Verordnung über die Erneuerung des Eisernen Kreuzes (Regulation of the renewing of the Iron Cross). The list is initially sorted by the chronological number assigned to the recipient.

Number	Name	Rank	Unit	Date of award	Notes
1	Erich Raeder	Großadmiral	Oberbefehlshaber der Kriegsmarine	30 September 1939	
2	Günther Prien	Kapitänleutnant	commander of U-47	18 October 1939	Awarded 5th Oak Leaves 20 October 1940
3	Herbert Schultze	Kapitänleutnant	commander of U-48	1 March 1940	Awarded 15th Oak Leaves 12 June 1941
4	Otto Schniewind	Vizeadmiral	Chef des Stabes der Seekriegsleitung im OKM (Note: According to Scherzer as Chef des Stabes der Seekriegsleitung und Chef des Marinekommando Amt im OKM.)	20 April 1940	
5	Karl Dönitz	Konteradmiral	Befehlshaber der U-Boote	21 April 1940	Awarded 223rd Oak Leaves 6 April 1943
6	Alfred Saalwächter	General Admiral	Marine-Gruppenbefehlshaber Marinegruppe West (Note: According to Scherzer as commander of Marinegruppenkommando West.)	9 May 1940	
7	Erich Bey	Kapitän zur See	chief of the 4. Zerstörerflottille	9 May 1940	Killed in action 26 December 1943
8	Werner Hartmann	Korvettenkapitän	commander of U-37	9 May 1940	Awarded 645th Oak Leaves 5 November 1944
9	Otto Schuhart	Kapitänleutnant	commander of U-29	16 May 1940	
10	Hans Bartels	Kapitänleutnant	commander of Minensucher M-1	16 May 1940	
11	Hermann Opdenhoff	Oberleutnant zur See	commander of Schnellboot S-31 in the 2. Schnellbootflottille	16 May 1940	Killed in action 22 March 1945
12	Erich Grundmann	Kapitänleutnant (Ing.)	Flottillen engineer in the 1. Räumbootflottille	31 May 1940	
13	Arthur Godenau	Stabsobersteuermann	commander of Räumboot R-51 in the 1 Räumbootflottille	31 May 1940	
14	Karl Rixecker	Stabsobersteuermann	commander of Räumboot R-23 in the 1 Räumbootflottille	31 May 1940	
15	Rolf Carls	Admiral	Befehlshaber Marinegruppe Ost	14 June 1940	
16	Günther Lütjens	Vizeadmiral	Befehlshaber der Aufklärungsstreitkräfte	14 June 1940	Killed in action 27 May 1941
17	Hubert Schmundt	Konteradmiral	Befehlshaber der Aufklärungsstreitkräfte und Führer der Kampfgruppe Bergen (Note: According to Scherzer as stellvertretender Befehlshaber der Aufklärungs-Streitkräfte und Führer der Kriegschiffgruppe 3 (Zielhafen Bergen)—deputy commander of the reconnaissance forces and leader of the warship group 3 (destination Bergen).)	14 June 1940	
18	Heinz Birnbacher	Kapitänleutnant	chief of the 1. Schnellbootflottille	17 June 1940	
19	Wilhelm Rollmann	Kapitänleutnant	commander of U-34	31 July 1940	Killed in action 5 November 1943
20	Fritz Berger	Fregattenkapitän	chief of the 1. Zerstörerflottille	4 August 1940	
21	Max-Eckart Wolff	Korvettenkapitän	commander of destroyer Z2 Georg Thiele	4 August 1940	
22	Rudolf Petersen	Korvettenkapitän	chief of the 2. Schnellbootflottille	4 August 1940	Awarded 499th Oak Leaves 13 June 1944
23	Otto Kretschmer	Kapitänleutnant	commander of U-99	4 August 1940	Awarded 6th Oak Leaves 4 November 1940; 5th Swords 26 December 1941
24	Heinrich Liebe	Kapitänleutnant	commander of U-38	14 August 1940	Awarded 13th Oak Leaves 10 June 1941
25	Fritz-Julius Lemp	Kapitänleutnant	commander of U-30	14 August 1940	Killed in action 9 May 1941
26	Kurt Fimmen	Oberleutnant zur See	commander of Schnellboot S-26 in the 1. Schnellbootflottille	14 August 1940	
27	Götz Freiherr von Mirbach	Oberleutnant zur See	commander of Schnellboot S-21 in the 1. Schnellbootflottille	14 August 1940	Awarded 500th Oak Leaves 14 June 1944
28	Hans-Rudolf Rösing	Korvettenkapitän	chief of the 7. Unterseebootsflottille and commander of U-48	29 August 1940	
29	Fritz Frauenheim	Kapitänleutnant	commander of U-101	29 August 1940	
30	Engelbert Endrass	Oberleutnant zur See	commander of U-46	5 September 1940	Awarded 14th Oak Leaves 10 June 1941
31	Günter Kuhnke	Kapitänleutnant	commander of U-28	19 September 1940	
32	Joachim Schepke	Kapitänleutnant	commander of U-100	24 September 1940	Awarded 7th Oak Leaves 1 December 1940
33	Kurt Böhmer	Kapitän zur See	Chef des Stabes Befehlshaber der Sicherung der Nordsee	6 October 1940	Killed in action 1 October 1944
34	Kurt Thoma	Korvettenkapitän	chief of the 2. Minensuchflottille	6 October 1940	
35	Gerhard von Kamptz	Korvettenkapitän	chief of the 2. Räumbootflottille	6 October 1940	Awarded 225th Oak Leaves 14 April 1943
36	Hans Jenisch	Oberleutnant zur See	commander of U-32	7 October 1940	
37	Friedrich Bonte	Kapitän zur See	Führer der Zerstörer und der Kampfgruppe Narvik	17 Oct 1940*	Killed in action 10 April 1940
38	Friedrich Ruge	Kapitän zur See	Führer der Minensuchboote West	21 October 1940	
39	Victor Oehrn	Kapitänleutnant	commander of U-37	21 October 1940	
40	Gerd Suhren	Oberleutnant (Ing.)	chief engineer on U-37	21 October 1940	
41	Heinrich Bleichrodt	Kapitänleutnant	commander of U-48	24 October 1940	Awarded 125th Oak Leaves 23 September 1942
42	Wolfgang Lüth	Oberleutnant zur See	commander of U-138	24 October 1940	Awarded 142nd Oak Leaves 13 November 1942; 29th Swords 15 April 1943; 7th Diamonds 9 August 1943
43	Helmuth von Ruckteschell	Korvettenkapitän of the Reserves	commander of auxiliary cruiser Widder (HSK-3)	31 October 1940	Awarded 158th Oak Leaves 22 December 1942
44	Hans Erdmenger	Korvettenkapitän	commander of destroyer Z21 Wilhelm Heidkamp	3 November 1940	Killed in action 28 December 1943
45	Reinhard Suhren	Oberleutnant zur See	I. Wachoffizier U-48	3 November 1940	Awarded 56th Oak Leaves 31 December 1941; 18th Swords 1 September 1942
46	Heinrich Petersen	Stabsobersteuermann	Wachoffizier und Steuermann U-99	5 November 1940	
47	Hans Stohwasser	Konteradmiral	Befehlshaber der Sicherung der Ostsee	30 November 1940	
48	Bernhard Rogge	Kapitän zur See	commander of auxiliary cruiser Atlantis (HSK-2)	7 December 1940	Awarded 45th Oak Leaves 31 December 1941
49	Viktor Schütze	Korvettenkapitän	commander of U-103	11 December 1940	Awarded 23rd Oak Leaves 14 July 1941
50	Wolfgang Kaden	Kapitänleutnant of the Reserves	commander of U-Jäger 116	18 December 1940	Killed in action 9 July 1942
51	Otto Kähler	Kapitän zur See	commander of auxiliary cruiser Thor (HSK-4)	22 December 1940	Awarded 583rd Oak Leaves 15 September 1944
52	Ernst-Felix Krüder	Kapitän zur See	commander of auxiliary cruiser Pinguin (HSK-5)	22 December 1940	Awarded 40th Oak Leaves 15 November 1941
53	Hans-Gerrit von Stockhausen	Korvettenkapitän	commander of U-65	14 January 1941	
54	Oskar Kummetz	Konteradmiral	Führer Kampfgruppe Oslo	18 January 1941	
55	August Thiele	Kapitän zur See	commander of cruiser Lützow	18 November 1941	Awarded 824th Oak Leaves 8 April 1945
56	Hellmuth Heye	Kapitän zur See	commander of heavy cruiser Admiral Hipper	18 January 1941	
57	Theodor Krancke	Kapitän zur See	commander of heavy cruiser Admiral Scheer	21 February 1941	Awarded 614th Oak Leaves 18 October 1944
58	Werner Töniges	Oberleutnant zur See	commander of Schnellboot S-102 in the 1. Schnellbootflottille	25 February 1941	Awarded 143rd Oak Leaves 13 November 1942
59	Wilhelm Meisel	Kapitän zur See	commander of heavy cruiser Admiral Hipper	26 February 1941	
60	Karl-Heinz Moehle	Kapitänleutnant	commander of U-123	26 February 1941	
61	Heinrich Lehmann-Willenbrock	Kapitänleutnant	commander of U-96	26 February 1941	Awarded 51st Oak Leaves 31 December 1941
62	Hans Bütow	Kapitän zur See	Führer der Torpedoboote	12 March 1941	
63	Bernd-Georg Klug	Kapitänleutnant	commander of Schnellboot S-28 in the 1. Schnellbootflottille	12 March 1941	Awarded 361st Oak Leaves 1 January 1944
64	Jürgen Oesten	Kapitänleutnant	commander of U-106	26 March 1941	
65	Georg-Wilhelm Schulz	Kapitänleutnant	commander of U-124	4 April 1941	
66	Erich Zürn	Oberleutnant (Ing.)	chief engineer on U-48	23 April 1941	
67	Klaus Feldt	Oberleutnant zur See	commander of Schnellboot S-30 in the 2. Schnellbootflottille	25 April 1941	Awarded 362nd Oak Leaves 1 January 1944
68	Georg Christiansen	Oberleutnant zur See	commander of Schnellboot S-101 in the 1. Schnellbootflottille	8 May 1941	Awarded 326th Oak Leaves 13 November 1943
69	Herbert Kuppisch	Kapitänleutnant	commander of U-94	14 May 1941	Killed in action 27 August 1943
70	Herbert Wohlfarth	Kapitänleutnant	commander of U-556	15 May 1941	
71	Georg Schewe	Kapitänleutnant	commander of U-105	23 May 1941	
72	Eberhard Wolfram	Konteradmiral	Befehlshaber der Sicherung der Nordsee	25 May 1941	
73	Adalbert Schneider	Korvettenkapitän	1st artillery officer on battleship Bismarck	27 May 1941	Killed in action 27 May 1941
74	Claus Korth	Kapitänleutnant	commander of U-93	29 May 1941	
75	Erich Topp	Oberleutnant zur See	commander of U-552	20 June 1941	Awarded 87th Oak Leaves 11 April 1942; 17th Swords 17 August 1942
76	Günter Hessler	Kapitänleutnant	commander of U-107	24 June 1941	
77	Gustav Forstmann	Korvettenkapitän	chief of the 1. Räumbootflottille	28 July 1941	
78	Jost Metzler	Kapitänleutnant	commander of U-69	28 July 1941	
79	Fritz Breithaupt	Korvettenkapitän of the Reserves	chief of the 12. Minensuchflottille	3 August 1941	Awarded 387th Oak Leaves 10 February 1944
80	Karl Palmgreen	Korvettenkapitän of the Reserves	commander of Sperrbrecher IX and I	3 August 1941	Awarded 523rd Oak Leaves 11 July 1944
81	Siegfried Wuppermann	Oberleutnant zur See	commander of Schnellboot S-60 in the 3. Schnellbootflottille (Note: According to Scherzer as commander of Schnellboot S-60.)	3 August 1941	Awarded 226th Oak Leaves 14 April 1943
82	Kurt Weyher	Fregattenkapitän	commander of auxiliary cruiser Orion (HSK-1)	21 August 1941	
83	Adalbert Schnee	Oberleutnant zur See	commander of U-201	30 August 1941	Awarded 105th Oak Leaves 15 July 1942
84	Werner Dobberstein	Kapitänleutnant	chief of the 5. Räumbootflottille	4 September 1941	
85	Rudolf Porath	Leutnant zur See of the Reserves	commander of Vorpostenboot VP-1806 in the 18. Vorpostenflottille	8 October 1941	
86	Karl Weniger	Kapitän zur See	2. Sicherungs-Division	15 November 1941*	Killed in action 1 October 1941
87	Rolf Mützelburg	Kapitänleutnant	commander of U-203	17 November 1941	Awarded 104th Oak Leaves 15 July 1942
88	Ernst Mengersen	Kapitänleutnant	commander of U-101	18 November 1941	
89	Robert Eyssen	Konteradmiral	commander of auxiliary cruiser Komet (HSK-7)	29 November 1941	
90	Theodor Detmers	Fregattenkapitän	commander of auxiliary cruiser Kormoran (HSK-8)	4 December 1941	
91	Friedrich Guggenberger	Kapitänleutnant	commander of U-81	10 December 1941	Awarded 171st Oak Leaves 8 January 1943
92	Klaus Scholtz	Kapitänleutnant	commander of U-108	26 December 1941	Awarded 123rd Oak Leaves 10 September 1942
93	Gerhard Bigalk	Kapitänleutnant	commander of U-751	26 December 1941	Killed in action 17 July 1942
94	Ernst Lindemann	Kapitän zur See	commander of battleship Bismarck	27 December 1941*	Killed in action 27 May 1941
95	Dr.-Ing. Karl-Friedrich Brill	Korvettenkapitän of the Reserves	Minenschiff Cobra	27 December 1941	Awarded 330th Oak Leaves 18 November 1943
96	Axel Goetzke	Leutnant zur See of the Reserves	commander of Räumboot R-16 in the 5. Räumbootflottille	27 December 1941*	Killed in action (sabotage) 27 September 1941
97	Hans Rehm	Korvettenkapitän	chief of the 2. Minensuchflottille	31 December 1941	
98	Eitel-Friedrich Kentrat	Kapitänleutnant	commander of U-74	31 December 1941	
99	Robert Gysae	Kapitänleutnant	commander of U-98	31 December 1941	Awarded 250th Oak Leaves 31 May 1943
100	Niels Bätge	Kapitänleutnant	chief of the 4. Schnellbootflottille	4 January 1942	Killed in action 12 December 1944
101	Reinhard Hardegen	Kapitänleutnant	commander of U-123	23 January 1942	Awarded 89th Oak Leaves 23 April 1942
102	Hans-Diedrich Freiherr von Tiesenhausen	Kapitänleutnant	commander of U-331	27 January 1942	
103	Nicolai Clausen	Kapitänleutnant	commander of U-129	13 March 1942	Killed in action 16 May 1943
104	Ernst Bauer	Kapitänleutnant	commander of U-126	16 March 1942	
105	Otto Ciliax	Vizeadmiral	Befehlshaber der Schlachtschiffe	21 March 1942	
106	Kurt-Caesar Hoffmann	Kapitän zur See	commander of battleship Scharnhorst	21 March 1942	
107	Johann Mohr	Kapitänleutnant	commander of U-124	27 March 1942	Awarded 177th Oak Leaves 13 January 1943
108	Otto Ites	Oberleutnant zur See	commander of U-94	28 March 1942	
109	Robert-Richard Zapp	Korvettenkapitän	commander of U-66	23 April 1942	
110	Werner Winter	Kapitänleutnant	commander of U-103	5 June 1942	
111	Peter-Erich Cremer	Kapitänleutnant	commander of U-333	5 June 1942	
112	Karl-Friedrich Merten	Korvettenkapitän	commander of U-68	13 June 1942	Awarded 147th Oak Leaves 16 November 1942
113	Jost Brökelmann	Korvettenkapitän	chief of the 2. Räumbootflottille	14 June 1942	
114	Hans-Werner Kraus	Kapitänleutnant	commander of U-83	19 June 1942	
115	Erwin Rostin	Kapitänleutnant	commander of U-158	28 June 1942	
116	Heinz-Otto Schultze	Kapitänleutnant	commander of U-432	9 July 1942	Killed in action 25 November 1943
117	Friedrich Kemnade	Kapitänleutnant	chief of the 3. Schnellbootflottille	23 July 1942	Awarded 249th Oak Leaves 27 May 1943
118	Karl Bergelt	Korvettenkapitän	chief of the 1. Minensuchflottille	3 August 1942	
119	Georg Lassen	Oberleutnant zur See	commander of U-160	10 August 1942	Awarded 208th Oak Leaves 7 March 1943
120	Helmut Rosenbaum	Kapitänleutnant	commander of U-73	12 August 1942	
121	Adolf Piening	Kapitänleutnant	commander of U-155	13 August 1942	
122	Heinrich Schonder	Kapitänleutnant	commander of U-77	19 August 1942	Killed in action 28 June 1943
123	Karl Thurmann	Korvettenkapitän	commander of U-553	24 August 1942	missing in action 28 January 1943
124	Ernst Kals	Korvettenkapitän	commander of U-130	1 September 1942	
125	Werner Hartenstein	Korvettenkapitän	commander of U-156	17 September 1942	Killed in action 8 March 1943
126	Günther Krech	Kapitänleutnant	commander of U-558	17 September 1942	
127	Kurt Fricke	Admiral	Chief of Staff of the Seekriegsleitung in the OKM	1 October 1942	
128	Hermann Bögel	Leutnant zur See of the Reserves	commander of Minensucher M-4040	13 October 1942	
129	Otto von Bülow	Kapitänleutnant	commander of U-404	20 October 1942	Awarded 234th Oak Leaves 26 April 1943
130	Helmut Witte	Kapitänleutnant	commander of U-159	22 October 1942	
131	Siegfried Strelow	Kapitänleutnant	commander of U-435	27 October 1942	Killed in action 15 July 1943
132	Fritz Poske	Korvettenkapitän	commander of U-504	6 November 1942	
133	Carl Emmermann	Kapitänleutnant	commander of U-172	27 November 1942	Awarded 256th Oak Leaves 4 July 1943
134	Günther Müller-Stöckheim	Kapitänleutnant	commander of U-67	27 November 1942	Killed in action 16 July 1943
135	Wilhelm Dommes	Kapitänleutnant	commander of U-431	2 December 1942	
136	Waldemar Holst	Korvettenkapitän	chief of the 4. Räumbootflottille	3 December 1942	
137	Friedrich Wunderlich	Korvettenkapitän	chief of the 14. U-Jagd-Flottille	3 December 1942	
138	Rolf Johannesson	Kapitän zur See	commander of destroyer Hermes	7 December 1942	
139	Hans Witt	Kapitänleutnant	commander of U-129	17 December 1942	
140	Werner Henke	Oberleutnant zur See	commander of U-515	17 December 1942	Awarded 257th Oak Leaves 4 July 1943
141	Hermann Rasch	Kapitänleutnant	commander of U-106	29 December 1942	
142	Günther Gumprich	Kapitän zur See	commander of auxiliary cruiser Thor (HSK-4)	31 December 1942	Killed in action 17 October 1943
143	Harro Schacht	Korvettenkapitän	commander of U-507	9 January 1943	Killed in action 14 January 1943
144	Albrecht Achilles	Kapitänleutnant	commander of U-161	16 January 1943	Killed in action 27 September 1943
145	Herbert Schneider	Kapitänleutnant	commander of U-522	16 January 1943	Killed in action 24 February 1943
146	Heinrich Bramesfeld	Kapitän zur See	2. Sicherungs-Division	21 January 1943	
147	Ulrich Heyse	Kapitänleutnant	commander of U-128	21 January 1943	
148	Albrecht Brandi	Kapitänleutnant	commander of U-617	21 January 1943	Awarded 224th Oak Leaves 11 April 1943; 66th Swords 9 May 1944; 22nd Diamonds 24 November 1944
149	Siegfried Freiherr von Forstner	Kapitänleutnant	commander of U-402	9 February 1943	Killed in action 13 October 1943 (Note: Sources are inconclusive with respect to date of death. Some sources indicate that von Forstner succumbed to his injuries on 22 October 1943 nine days after the sinking of U-402 on 13 October 1943.)
150	Gerhard Bielig	Kapitänleutnant (Ing.)	chief engineer on U-177	10 February 1943	
151	Karl Jörß	Bootsmannsmaat of the Reserves	Flakleiter auf einem Frachter im Mittelmeer	17 February 1943	
152	Erich Würdemann	Kapitänleutnant	commander of U-506	14 March 1943	Killed in action 14 July 1943
153	Reinhart Reche	Kapitänleutnant	commander of U-255	17 March 1943	
154	Hans-Hartwig Trojer	Oberleutnant zur See	commander of U-221	24 March 1943	
155	Harald Gelhaus	Kapitänleutnant	commander of U-107	26 March 1943	
156	Karl Neitzel	Korvettenkapitän	commander of U-510	27 March 1943	
157	Günther Seibicke	Kapitänleutnant	commander of U-436	27 March 1943	Killed in action 26 May 1943
158	Ulrich Folkers	Kapitänleutnant	commander of U-125	27 March 1943	Killed in action 6 May 1943
159	Karl-Conrad Mecke	Kapitän zur See	commander of the 22. Marine-Flak-Regiment	11 April 1943	
160	Hans Heidtmann	Kapitänleutnant	commander of U-559	12 April 1943	
161	Helmut Möhlmann	Kapitänleutnant	commander of U-571	16 April 1943	
162	Hermann Büchting	Kapitänleutnant	commander of Schnellboot S-27 in the 1. Schnellbootflottille (Note: According to Scherzer as commander of Schnellboot S-27 respectively S-51 in the 1. Schnellbootflottille.)	22 April 1943	
163	Gunter Jahn	Kapitänleutnant	commander of U-596	30 April 1943	
164	Klaus Bargsten	Kapitänleutnant	commander of U-521	30 April 1943	
165	Wilhelm Franken	Kapitänleutnant	commander of U-565	30 April 1943	Killed in action 13 January 1945
166	Karl-Heinz Fischer	Steuermannsmaat	Vorpostenboot VP-711	3 May 1943	
167	Otto Flügel	Steuermannsmaat of the Reserves	Vorpostenboot VP-1525	3 May 1943	
168	Curt Rechel	Fregattenkapitän	commander of destroyer Z29	8 May 1943	
169	Dr. phil. Walther Fischer	Korvettenkapitän of the Reserves	chief of the 13. Vorpostenflottille	8 May 1943	
170	Otto Pollmann	Leutnant zur See of the Reserves	commander of U-Jäger 2210 in the 22. U-Jagdflottille	19 May 1943	Awarded 461st Oak Leaves 25 April 1944
171	Alfred Schulze-Hinrichs	Kapitän zur See	chief of the 6. Zerstörerflottille	15 June 1943	
172	Karl Smidt	Kapitän zur See	commander of destroyer Z27	15 June 1943	
173	Martin Saltzwedel	Korvettenkapitän	commander of destroyer Z24	15 June 1943	
174	Otto Maurer	Korvettenkapitän	chief of the 12. Räumbootflottille	3 July 1943	
175	Günther Heydemann	Kapitänleutnant	commander of U-575	3 July 1943	
176	Horst Weber	Oberleutnant zur See of the Reserves (Note: According to Scherzer as Oberleutnant zur See and commander of Schnellboot S-55.)	commander of Schnellboot S-55 in the 3. Schnellbootflottille	5 July 1943	
177	Friedrich Markworth	Kapitänleutnant	commander of U-66	8 July 1943	
178	Karl Müller	Kapitänleutnant	commander of Schnellboot S-52 in the 5. Schnellbootflottille (Note: According to Scherzer commander of Schnellboot S-52.)	8 July 1943	
179	Georg Staats	Kapitänleutnant	commander of U-508	14 July 1943	Killed in action 12 November 1943
180	Karl-Ehrhart Karcher	Oberleutnant zur See	commander of Schnellboot S-87 in the 4. Schnellbootflottille	12 August 1943	
181	Otto von Schrader	Admiral	commanding Admiral Norwegian West Coast	19 August 1943	
182	Gerd Kelbling	Kapitänleutnant	commander of U-593	18 August 1943	
183	Gustav Freiherr von Liebenstein	Fregattenkapitän of the Reserves	chief of 2. Landungsdivision and sea transport chief of the Strait of Messina	3 September 1943	
184	Herbert Panknin	Kapitänleutnant (Ing.)	chief engineer on U-106	4 September 1943	
185	Dipl.-Ing. Willi Lechtenbörger	Oberleutnant (Ing.) of the Reserves	chief engineer on U-847	4 September 1943*	Killed in action 27 August 1943
186	Heinz Krey	Leutnant (Ing.)	chief engineer on U-752	4 September 1943*	Killed in action 23 May 1943
187	August Maus	Kapitänleutnant	commander of U-185	21 September 1943	
188	Dietrich Schöneboom	Oberleutnant zur See	commander of U-431	20 October 1943	Killed in action 23 October 1943
189	Carl-August Landfermann	Oberleutnant (Ing.) of the Reserves	chief engineer on U-181	27 October 1943	
190	Franz Kohlauf	Korvettenkapitän	chief of the 4. Torpedobootflottille	29 October 1943	Killed in action 26 April 1944
191	Hellmut Rohweder	Kapitänleutnant (Ing.)	chief engineer on U-69 and U-514	14 November 1943	
192	Egon-Reiner Freiherr von Schlippenbach	Kapitänleutnant	commander of U-453	19 November 1943	
193	Gustav Kieseritzky	Vizeadmiral	commanding Admiral Black Sea	20 November 1943	
194	Horst-Arno Fenski	Oberleutnant zur See	commander of U-410	26 November 1943	
195	Heinz Franke	Kapitänleutnant	commander of U-262	30 November 1943	
196	Karl-Friedrich Künzel	Oberleutnant zur See	group leader and commander of Schnellboot S-28 in the 1. Schnellbootflottille	12 December 1943	
197	Albert Müller	Kapitänleutnant	commander of Schnellboot S-59 in the 3. Schnellbootflottille	13 December 1943	
198	Max-Martin Teichert	Kapitänleutnant	commander of U-456	19 December 1943*	Killed in action 12 May 1943
199	Helmut Klassmann	Kapitänleutnant	chief of the 3. Räumbootflottille	22 December 1943	
200	Klaus-Degenhard Schmidt	Oberleutnant zur See	commander of Schnellboot S-54 in the 10 Schnellbootflottille (Note: According to Scherzer as commander of Schnellboot S-54.)	22 December 1943	Killed in action 22 December 1944
201	Dr. med. Günther Brandt	Korvettenkapitän of the Reserves	chief of the 21. U-Jagdflottille	23 December 1943	
202	Paul Hellmann	Kapitän der Handelsmarine	captain Blockadebrecher Motorschiff Osorno	6 January 1944	
203	Siegfried Koitschka	Oberleutnant zur See	commander of U-616	27 January 1944	
204	Hans-Jürgen Hellriegel	Kapitänleutnant	commander of U-543	3 February 1944	Killed in action 2 July 1944
205	Siegfried Lüdden	Kapitänleutnant	commander of U-188	11 February 1944	Killed on active service 13 January 1945
206	Johann-Friedrich Wessels	Kapitänleutnant (Ing.)	chief engineer on U-198	9 March 1944	
207	Gustav Poel	Kapitänleutnant	commander of U-413	21 March 1944	
208	Waldemar Mehl	Kapitänleutnant	commander of U-371	28 March 1944	
209	Alfred Eick	Oberleutnant zur See	commander of U-510	31 March 1944	
210	Georg Olschewski	Oberleutnant (Ing.)	chief engineer on U-66	23 April 1944	
211	Erich Wulff	Oberleutnant zur See	commander of Vorpostenboot VP-18 in the 18. Vorpostenflottille (Note: According to Scherzer as commander in the 18. Vorpostenflottille.)	24 April 1944	
212	Wilhelm Meendsen-Bohlken	Konteradmiral	Befehlshaber Deutsches Marinekorps in Italien	15 May 1944	
213	Arnulf Hölzerkopf	Korvettenkapitän	chief of the 8. Minensuchflottille	15 May 1944	Killed in action 11 August 1944
214	Walter Käding	Obersteuermann	III. Wachoffizier and Steuermann U-123	15 May 1944	
215	Helmuth Brinkmann	Vizeadmiral	commanding Admiral Schwarzes Meer	17 May 1944	
216	Otto Schulz	Konteradmiral	Seekommandant Krim (sea commander Crimea) (Note: According to Scherzer as commander of the sea defence of the Crimea.)	17 May 1944	
217	Horst Hofmann	Obersteuermann	Steuermann and watch officer U-672	20 May 1944	
218	Karl-Heinz Wiebe	Kapitänleutnant (Ing.)	chief engineer on U-178	22 May 1944	
219	Horst von Schroeter	Oberleutnant zur See	commander of U-123	1 June 1944	
220	Heinrich Hoffmann	Korvettenkapitän	chief of the 5. Torpedobootflottille	7 June 1944	Awarded 524th Oak Leaves 11 July 1944
221	Albert Oesterlin	Kapitänleutnant of the Reserves	chief of the Küstenschutzflottille "Attika"	9 June 1944*	Killed in action 23 January 1944
222	Dr.-Ing. Viktor Rall	Korvettenkapitän of the Reserves	chief of the 15. Vorpostenflottille	10 June 1944	
223	Kurt Johannsen	Kapitänleutnant	chief of the 5. Schnellbootflottille	14 June 1944	Killed in action 14 June 1944
224	Walter Ohmsen	Oberleutnant	chief of the Marinebatterie "Marcouf" in the Marine-Artillerie-Abteilung 260	14 June 1944	
225	Wirich von Gartzen	Korvettenkapitän	chief of the 10. Torpedobootflottille	24 June 1944	
226	Dipl.-Ing. Kurt Loewer	Korvettenkapitän of the Reserves	chief of the 11. Vorpostenflottille	24 June 1944	
227	Walter Hennecke	Konteradmiral	Seekommandant Normandie	26 June 1944	
228	Rudi Gelbhaar	Oberleutnant of the Reserves	chief of the Marine-Batterie "Hamburg" of the Marine-Artillerie-Abteilung 604	26 June 1944	
229	Ekkehard Martienssen	Oberleutnant zur See of the Reserves	commander of Vorpostenboot VP-203 in the 2. Vorpostenflottille	29 June 1944	
230	Theodor Freiherr von Mauchenheim genannt Bechtolsheim	Kapitän zur See	chief of the 8. Zerstörerflottille	3 July 1944	
231	Wilhelm Anhalt	Kapitänleutnant	chief of the 4. Räumbootflottille	3 July 1944	
232	Elmershaus von Haxthausen	Kapitänleutnant	chief of the 2. Artillerieträger-Flottille	3 July 1944	
233	Walther Gerhold	Marine-Schreiber-Obergefreiter	Einmanntorpedofahrer in the Kleinkampfflottille 361	6 July 1944	
234	Johann-Otto Krieg	Oberleutnant zur See	chief of the Kleinkampfflottille 361	8 July 1944	
235	Reinhard König	Oberleutnant (Ing.)	chief engineer on U-123	8 July 1944	
236	Heinz Sieder	Oberleutnant zur See	commander of U-984	8 July 1944	Killed in action 20 August 1944
237	Herbert Nau	Kapitänleutnant	chief of the 10. Räumbootflottille	11 July 1944	Killed on active service 22 August 1944
238	Karl Fleige	Oberleutnant zur See	commander of U-18	18 July 1944	
239	Karl-Heinz Marbach	Oberleutnant zur See	commander of U-953	22 July 1944	
240	Herbert Berrer	Oberfernschreibmeister-Matrose	Einmanntorpedofahrer in der Kleinkampfflottille 361	5 August 1944	
241	Hermann Stuckmann	Oberleutnant zur See	commander of U-621	11 August 1944	Killed in action 23 August 1944
242	Georg Pinkepank	Korvettenkapitän	chief of the 2. Räumbootflottille	12 August 1944	
243	Erich Klünder	Korvettenkapitän	chief of the 5. Minensuchflottille	12 August 1944	
244	Alfred Muser	Kapitänleutnant	chief of the 8. Räumbootflottille	12 August 1944	
245	Alfred Vetter	Leutnant	group leader in the Marine-Kleinkampfflottille 211	12 August 1944	
246	Heinrich Dammeier	Stabsobermaschinist	Obermaschinist U-270	12 August 1944	
247	Richard Seuss	Oberleutnant of the Reserves	chief of the Marine Küstenbatterie "Île de Cézembre" (Marine-Artillerie-Abteilung 608)	15 August 1944	Awarded 577th Oak Leaves 2 September 1944
248	Werner Endell	Kapitän zur See	harbor commander "Saint-Malo"	18 August 1944	
249	Friedrich Böhme	Kapitän zur See	Einsatzleiter der Marine-Kleinkampfmittel in Frankreich	26 August 1944	
250	Hans-Günther Lange	Kapitänleutnant	commander of U-711	26 August 1944	Awarded 853rd Oak Leaves 29 April 1945
251	Karl Schulz	Oberleutnant zur See of the Reserves	group leader and commander of Vorpostenboot VP-1509 in the 15. Vorpostenflottille	26 August 1944	
252	Rudolf Jesse	Oberleutnant zur See of the Reserves	commander in the 8. Minensuchflottille	5 September 1944	
253	Otto Nordt	Kapitänleutnant	chief of the 14. Räumbootflottille	6 September 1944	
254	Kurt Blasberg	Oberleutnant zur See of the Reserves	group leader in the 36. Minensuchflottille	7 September 1944	
255	Edgar Jungnickel	Oberleutnant zur See	commander of U-Jäger 1430	10 September 1944	
256	Heinrich Timm	Korvettenkapitän	commander of U-862	17 September 1944	
257	Hermann Witt	Fregattenkapitän	harbor commander Cherbourg	24 September 1944	
258	Hermann Knuth	Kapitän zur See	chief of the 1. Sicherungs-Division	24 September 1944	
259	Paul Lehmann	Korvettenkapitän of the Reserves	chief of the 42. Minensuchflottille	24 September 1944	
260	Theodor Burchardi	Vizeadmiral	Kommandierender Admiral Ostland	29 September 1944	Awarded 823rd Oak Leaves 8 April 1945
261	Gerhard Schaar	Oberleutnant zur See	commander of U-957	1 October 1944	
262	Gerd-Dietrich Schneider	Oberleutnant zur See	chief of the 8. Artillerie-Trägerflottille	3 October 1944	
263	Eugen Tellgmann	Oberleutnant zur See of the Reserves	commander of Vorpostenboot VP-1313 in the 13. Vorpostenflottille	5 October 1944	
264	Hans Hoßfeld	Kapitänleutnant	Marine-Artillerie-Abteilung 531	6 October 1944	Awarded 659th Oak Leaves 25 November 1944
265	Joachim Szyskowitz	Fregattenkapitän	harbor commander Antwerp	13 October 1944	
266	Hans-Joachim Förster	Oberleutnant zur See	commander of U-480	18 December 1944	Killed in action 24 February 1945
267	Joachim Wünning	Korvettenkapitän of the Reserves	commander of Minenschiff Drache	22 October 1944*	Killed in action 22 September 1944
268	Werner Lange	Vizeadmiral	commanding Admiral Aegean Sea	28 October 1944	
269	Wilhelm Meentzen	Kapitänleutnant	commander of Torpedoboot T-24	30 October 1944	
270	Paul Brasack	Kapitänleutnant	commander of U-737	30 October 1944	
271	Heinrich Garbers	Leutnant zur See of the Reserves	commander of Hilfskriegsschiff Passim and leader of special assignments	1 November 1944	
272	Helmut Bastian	Kapitänleutnant	Führer einer Sprengbootflottille (Kleinkampfverband) (Note: According to Scherzer as chief of the Kleinkampfflottille 211.)	3 November 1944	
273	Friedrich-Wilhelm Thorwest	Korvettenkapitän of the Reserves	chief of the 2. Geleitflottille "Adria"	5 November 1944*	Killed in action 1 November 1944
274	Walter-Erich Schneider	Kapitänleutnant	chief of the 25. Minensuchflottille	5 November 1944	
275	Heinz Guhrke	Oberleutnant zur See of the Reserves	commander of Torpedoboot "TA20"	5 November 1944*	Killed in action 1 November 1944
276	Heinz Trautwein	Oberleutnant zur See of the Reserves	commander of U-Jäger 202	5 November 1944*	Killed in action 1 November 1944
277	Klaus Wenke	Oberleutnant zur See of the Reserves	commander of U-Jäger 208	5 November 1944	
278	Hellmuth Werther (Note: According to Scherzer name is spelled Helmuth Werther who received the Knight's Cross of the Iron Cross as group leader of the Minenschiffe (minelayers) in the 21. UJ-Flottille.)	Oberleutnant zur See of the Reserves	commander and group leader in the Küstenschutzflottille "Attika"	8 November 1944	
279	Heinz Haag	Oberleutnant zur See	commander of Schnellboot S-60 in the 3. Schnellbootflottille	25 November 1944	
280	Adalbert von Blanc	Fregattenkapitän	leader of the 9. Sicherungs-Division	27 November 1944	Awarded 866th Oak Leaves 7 May 1945
281	Dr. phil. Emil Kieffer	Korvettenkapitän of the Reserves	chief of the 3. Minensuchflottille	3 December 1944	
282	Rudolf Mühlbauer	Oberbootsmannsmaat	Brückenmaat on U-123	10 December 1944	
283	Günther Pulst	Oberleutnant zur See	commander of U-978	21 December 1944	
284	Hans Dominik	Fregattenkapitän	chief of the 9. Torpedobootflottille	28 December 1944	
285	Erich Brauneis	Fregattenkapitän	chief of the 24. Landungsflottille	28 December 1944	
286	Hans-Otto Philipp	Korvettenkapitän of the Reserves	chief of the 1. Küstensicherungs-Verband	31 December 1944	
287	Rolf Thomsen	Kapitänleutnant	commander of U-1202	4 January 1945	Awarded 852nd Oak Leaves 29 April 1945
288	Ernst Lucht	Konteradmiral	Befehlshaber der Sicherung der Nordsee	17 January 1945	
289	Ernst Hechler	Korvettenkapitän	commander of U-870	21 January 1945	
290	Dr. jur. Kurt Dobratz	Kapitän zur See	commander of U-1232	23 January 1945	
291	Johannes Limbach	Leutnant zur See	1st Officer U-181	6 February 1945	
292	Hans-Georg Hess	Oberleutnant zur See of the Reserves	commander of U-995	11 February 1945	
293	Friedrich-Karl Paul	Korvettenkapitän	chief of the 2. Torpedobootflottille	4 March 1945	
294	Ernst Schirlitz	Vizeadmiral	commander of fortress La Rochelle (Note: According to Scherzer as commander Atlantic coast and commander of fortress La Rochelle.)	11 March 1945	
295	Carl-Friedrich Mohr	Kapitänleutnant	chief of the 24. Minensuchflottille "Karl Friedrich Brill"	11 March 1945	
296	Otto Karl	Oberleutnant zur See of the Reserves	commander of Artillerie-Leichter AF-65 (Note: According to Scherzer as commander of Artillerie-Leichter AF-65 in the 6. Artillerieträger-Flottille.)	21 March 1945	
297	Otto Westphalen	Oberleutnant zur See	commander of U-968	23 March 1945	
298	Dr. rer.pol. Paul Fenn	Kapitän zur See	commander of the Marine-Flak-Regiment 9	25 March 1945	
299	Friedrich-Wilhelm Maes	Kapitänleutnant	commander of naval battery "Völtzendorf" in the Marine-Flak-Abteilung 219 of the 9. Marine-Flak-Regiment	25 March 1945*	
300	Philipp Lichtenberg	Kapitänleutnant (Ing.)	chief engineer on U-516	31 March 1945	
301	Hans Johannsen	Oberleutnant (Ing.)	chief engineer on U-802	31 March 1945	
302	Felix Zymalkowski	Korvettenkapitän	chief of the 8. Schnellbootflottille	10 April 1945	
303	Dr. phil. Heinz Stamer	Korvettenkapitän	chief of the 8. Vorpostenflottille	20 April 1945	
304	Rudolf Heynsen	Korvettenkapitän of the Reserves	chief of the 27. Minensuchflottille	20 April 1945	
305	Hermann Sardemann	Oberleutnant of the Reserves	chief of the naval artillery battery "Lausitz" in the Marine-Flak-Abteilung 259 of the Marine-Flak-Regiment 9	20 April 1945	
306	Heinrich Witt	Oberleutnant of the Reserves	chief of the naval artillery battery "Sargorsch" in the Marine-Flak-Abteilung 259 of the Marine-Flak-Regiment 9 (Note: According to Scherzer as chief 4 (Battery "Sagorsch")/Marine-Flak-Abteilung 259 in Gotenhafen.)	20 April 1945	
307	Hansjürgen Reinicke	Kapitän zur See	commander of the heavy cruiser Prinz Eugen	21 April 1945	
308	Heinrich Praßdorf	Obermaschinist	lead machinist on U-1203	21 April 1945	
309	Hans Michahelles	Konteradmiral	fortress commander of the northern Gironde estuary	30 April 1945	
310	Ingwer(Jens) Matzen	Korvettenkapitän	chief of the 6. Schnellbootflottille	2 May 1945	
311	Heinrich Schroeteler	Kapitänleutnant	commander of U-1023	2 May 1945	
312	Werner Weinlig? (Note: There is no reference of the Knight's Cross awarded to Werner Weidling in the German Federal Archives. His personal file contains a letter from 1955 by the Deutsche Dienststelle (WASt), indicating that no proof of the award exists. The date was assigned by the Association of Knight's Cross Recipients (AKCR).)	Kapitänleutnant	commander of Torpedoboot T-23	6 May 1945	
313	Hans Temming	Kapitänleutnant	commander of Torpedoboot T-28	6 May 1945	
314	Carl Hoff? (Note: There is no reference of the Knight's Cross awarded to Carl Hoff in the archives of the Kriegsmarine. His personal file contains a copy of a letter from 1955 by the Deutsche Dienststelle (WASt), indicating that no proof of the award exists. Author Manfred Dörr states that Hoff received the Knight's Cross on 28 May 1945, thus after the capitulation. The date was assigned by Walther-Peer Fellgiebel.)	Kapitänleutnant	chief of the 1. Räumbootflottille	9 May 1945	
315	Hans-Joachim Merks? (Note: There is no reference of the Knight's Cross awarded to Hans-Joachim Merks in the German Federal Archives. His personal file contains a letter from 1955 by the Deutsche Dienststelle (WASt), indicating that no proof of the award exists. The date was assigned by the Association of Knight's Cross Recipients (AKCR).)	Kapitänleutnant	chief of the 2. Räumbootflottille	28 May 1945	
317	Hans Lehmann	Oberleutnant zur See of the Reserves	commander of U-997	7 May 1945 (Note: Author Clemens Range dates Hans Lehmann's Knight's Cross on 8 June 1945, thus after the effectiveness of the Dönitz-decree. Walther-Peer Fellgiebel, author of Die Träger des Ritterkreuzes des Eisernen Kreuzes 1939-1945, indicates that Lehmann received the Knight's Cross on 11 May 1945 and Veit Scherzer states that 7 May 1945 as the correct date, thus before the Dönitz-decree prohibited the awarding of the Knight's Cross. The sequential number 317 associated to Lehmann's Knight's Cross is based on author Clemens Range's work Die Ritterkreuzträger der Kriegsmarine.)	

== Legally disputed Knight's Cross recipients ==
Großadmiral Karl Dönitz ordered a cease of all promotions and awards as of 11 May 1945. Nevertheless, a number of Knight's Crosses were awarded after this without legal authority. At least two members of the Kriegsmarine are often listed as recipients of the Knight's Cross but fall outside of the Dönitz decree. The Oberbefehlshaber der Kriegsmarine General-Admiral Walter Warzecha, successor of General-Admiral Hans-Georg von Friedeburg, without authorization presented Georg-Wolfgang Feller the Knight's Cross on 17 June 1945. Karl Jäckel received his Knight's Cross confirmation after 11 May 1945 and is a de facto but not de jure recipient. Both recipients were delisted by the Association of Knight's Cross Recipients (AKCR).

Number	Name	Rank	Unit	Date of award	Notes
316	Karl Jäckel	Obersteuermann	Steuermann on U-29, U-160 and U-907	1 June 1945	
318	Georg-Wolfgang Feller	Oberleutnant zur See of the Reserves	group leader in the 36. Minensuchflottille	17 June 1945	
