= List of Knight's Cross of the Iron Cross recipients of the Schnellboot service =

The Knight's Cross of the Iron Cross (Ritterkreuz des Eisernen Kreuzes) and its variants were the highest military award in Nazi Germany. Recipients are grouped by grades of the Knight's Cross. During World War II, 23 German sailors and officers of the Schnellboot (Fast Attack Craft) service, which was a part of the Kriegsmarine, received the Knight's Cross of the Iron Cross. Of these, 8 officers received the Knight's Cross of the Iron Cross with Oak Leaves (Ritterkreuz des Eisernen Kreuzes mit Eichenlaub).

== Background ==
The Knight's Cross of the Iron Cross and its higher grades were based on four separate enactments. The first enactment, Reichsgesetzblatt I S. 1573 of 1 September 1939 instituted the Iron Cross (Eisernes Kreuz), the Knight's Cross of the Iron Cross and the Grand Cross of the Iron Cross (Großkreuz des Eisernen Kreuzes). Article 2 of the enactment mandated that the award of a higher class be preceded by the award of all preceding classes. As the war progressed, some of the recipients of the Knight's Cross distinguished themselves further and a higher grade, the Knight's Cross of the Iron Cross with Oak Leaves (Ritterkreuz des Eisernen Kreuzes mit Eichenlaub), was instituted. The Oak Leaves, as they were commonly referred to, were based on the enactment Reichsgesetzblatt I S. 849 of 3 June 1940. In 1941, two higher grades of the Knight's Cross were instituted. The enactment Reichsgesetzblatt I S. 613 of 28 September 1941 introduced the Knight's Cross of the Iron Cross with Oak Leaves and Swords (Ritterkreuz des Eisernen Kreuzes mit Eichenlaub und Schwertern) and the Knight's Cross of the Iron Cross with Oak Leaves, Swords and Diamonds (Ritterkreuz des Eisernen Kreuzes mit Eichenlaub, Schwertern und Brillanten). At the end of 1944 the final grade, the Knight's Cross of the Iron Cross with Golden Oak Leaves, Swords, and Diamonds (Ritterkreuz des Eisernen Kreuzes mit goldenem Eichenlaub, Schwertern und Brillanten), based on the enactment Reichsgesetzblatt 1945 I S. 11 of 29 December 1944, became the final variant of the Knight's Cross authorized.

== Recipients ==
The Oberkommando der Wehrmacht kept separate Knight's Cross lists, one for each of the three military branches, Heer (Army), Kriegsmarine (Navy), Luftwaffe (Air force) and for the Waffen-SS. Within each of these lists a unique sequential number was assigned to each recipient. The same numbering paradigm was applied to the higher grades of the Knight's Cross, one list per grade.

This along with the + (plus) indicates that a higher grade of Knight's Cross was awarded as well.

=== Knight's Cross with Oak Leaves ===
The Knight's Cross with Oak Leaves was based on the enactment Reichsgesetzblatt I S. 849 of 3 June 1940. The last officially announced number for the Oak Leaves was 843.

Number	Name	Rank	Unit	Date of award	Notes
143	Werner Töniges	Kapitänleutnant	Commander of Schnellboot S-102 in the 1. Schnellbootflottille	13 November 1942	—
226	Siegfried Wuppermann	Oberleutnant zur See	Commander of Schnellboot S-56 in the 3. Schnellbootflottille (Note: According to Scherzer as commander of Schnellboot S-56.)	14 April 1943	—
249	Friedrich Kemnade	Korvettenkapitän	Chief of the 3. Schnellbootflottille	27 May 1943	—
326	Georg Christiansen	Korvettenkapitän	Chief of the 1. Schnellbootsflottille	13 November 1943	—
361	Bernd Klug	Korvettenkapitän	Chief of the 5. Schnellbootflottille	1 January 1944	—
362	Klaus Feldt	Korvettenkapitän	Chief of the 2. Schnellbootflottille	1 January 1944	—
499	Rudolf Petersen	Kapitän zur See	Leader of the Schnellboote	13 June 1944	—
500	Götz Freiherr von Mirbach	Kapitänleutnant	Chief of the 9. Schnellbootflottille	14 June 1944	—

=== Knight's Cross of the Iron Cross ===
The Knight's Cross of the Iron Cross is based on the enactment Reichsgesetzblatt I S. 1573 of 1 September 1939 Verordnung über die Erneuerung des Eisernen Kreuzes (Regulation of the renewing of the Iron Cross).

Number	Name	Rank	Unit	Date of award	Notes
1	Hermann Opdenhoff	Oberleutnant zur See	Commander Schnellboot S-31 in the 2. Schnellbootflottille (Note: According to Scherzer as commander of S-31.)	16 May 1940	Killed in action 22 March 1945
2	Heinz Birnbacher	Kapitänleutnant	Chief of the 1. Schnellbootflottille	17 June 1940	—
3	Rudolf Petersen+	Korvettenkapitän	Chief of the 2. Schnellbootsflottille	4 August 1940	Awarded 499th Oak Leaves 13 June 1944
4	Kurt Fimmen	Oberleutnant zur See	Commander of Schnellboot S-26 in the 1. Schnellbootflottille	14 August 1940	—
5	Götz Freiherr von Mirbach+	Oberleutnant zur See	Commander of Schnellboot S-21 in the 1. Schnellbootflottille (Note: According to Scherzer as commander of Schnellboot S-21.)	14 August 1940	Awarded 500th Oak Leaves 14 June 1944
6	Werner Töniges+	Oberleutnant zur See	Commander of Schnellboot S-102 in the 1. Schnellbootflottille (Note: According to Scherzer as commander of Schnellboot S-102.)	25 February 1941	Awarded 143rd Oak Leaves 13 November 1942
7	Bernd-Georg Klug+	Kapitänleutnant	Commander of Schnellboot S-28 in the 1. Schnellbootflottille	12 March 1941	Awarded 361st Oak Leaves 1 January 1944
8	Klaus Feldt+	Oberleutnant zur See	Commander of Schnellboot S-30 in the 2. Schnellbootflottille	25 April 1941	Awarded 362nd Oak Leaves 1 January 1944
9	Georg Christiansen+	Oberleutnant zur See	Commander of Schnellboot S-101 in the 1. Schnellbootflottille	8 May 1941	Awarded 326th Oak Leaves 13 November 1943
10	Siegfried Wuppermann+	Oberleutnant zur See	Commander of Schnellboot S-60 in the 3. Schnellbootflottille (Note: According to Scherzer as commander of Schnellboot S-60.)	3 August 1941	Awarded 226th Oak Leaves 14 April 1943
11	Niels Bätge	Kapitänleutnant	Chief of the 4. Schnellbootflottille	4 January 1942	Killed in action 12 December 1944
12	Friedrich Kemnade+	Kapitänleutnant	Chief of the 3. Schnellbootflottille	23 July 1942	Awarded 249th Oak Leaves 27 May 1943
13	Hermann Büchting	Kapitänleutnant	Commander of Schnellboot S-27 in the 1. Schnellbootflottille (Note: According to Scherzer as commander of Schnellboot S-27 respectively S-51 in the 1. Schnellbootflottille.)	22 April 1943	—
14	[Dr.] Horst Weber (Note: The brackets around the doctor title [Dr.] denotes that the academic title was attained after the Knight's Cross of the Iron Cross was awarded.)	Oberleutnant zur See of the Reserves (Note: According to Scherzer as Oberleutnant zur See and commander of Schnellboot S-55.)	Commander of Schnellboot S-55 in the 3. Schnellbootflottille	5 July 1943	—
15	Karl Müller	Kapitänleutnant	Commander of Schnellboot S-52 in the 5. Schnellbootflottille (Note: According to Scherzer commander of Schnellboot S-52.)	8 July 1943	—
16	Karl-Ehrhart Karcher	Oberleutnant zur See	Commander of Schnellboot S-87 in the 4. Schnellbootflottille	12 August 1943	—
17	Karl-Friedrich Künzel	Oberleutnant zur See	Group leader and commander of Schnellboot S-28 in the 1. Schnellbootflottille	12 December 1943	—
18	Albert Müller	Kapitänleutnant	Commander of Schnellboot S-59 in the 3. Schnellbootflottille (Note: According to Scherzer commander of Schnellboot S-52.)	13 December 1943	—
19	Klaus-Degenhard Schmidt	Oberleutnant zur See	Commander of Schnellboot S-54 in the 10. Schnellbootflottille (Note: According to Scherzer as commander of Schnellboot S-54.)	22 December 1943	Killed in action 22 December 1944
20	Kurt Johannsen	Kapitänleutnant	Chief of the 5. Schnellbootflottille	14 June 1944	Killed in action 14 June 1944
21	Heinz Haag	Oberleutnant zur See	Commander of Schnellboot S-60 in the 3. Schnellbootflottille	25 November 1944	—
22	Felix Zymalkowski	Korvettenkapitän	Chief of the 8. Schnellbootflottille	10 April 1945	—
23	Ingwer(Jens) Matzen	Korvettenkapitän	Chief of the 6. Schnellbootflottille	2 May 1945	—
