= Niels Bätge =

- Born: 19 April 1913; Reval, Governorate of Estonia, Russian Empire
- Died: 12 December 1944 (aged 31) near Åland
- Military career
- Allegiance: Weimar Republic (to 1933); Nazi Germany
- Branch: Reichsmarine; Kriegsmarine
- Service years: 1931–44
- Rank: Korvettenkapitän
- Units: SKS Niobe light cruiser Karlsruhe; Destroyer Hans Lody (Z10)
- Commands: Torpedoboot T2 and T20; 4. Schnellbootflottille; Destroyer Z35
- Conflicts: World War II
- Awards: Knight's Cross of the Iron Cross

Niels Bätge (19 April 1913 in Reval – 12 December 1944 near Åland) was a German Schnellboot commander with Baltic German origin in World War II and recipient of the Knight's Cross of the Iron Cross. Bätge was promoted to Korvettenkapitän on 1 September 1943. Shortly after his promotion he took command of the destroyer Z35 on 25 September 1943. The destroyers Z35 and Z36 both ran into a German naval mine in the Gulf of Finland on 12 December 1944. Bätge and 24 members of the crew managed to save themselves in a life boat. However, they all froze to death and were later washed ashore near Åland.

== World War II ==
At the start of World War II, Bätge was serving in a torpedo boat flotilla; during this period, he commanded the torpedo boat T2. In October 1940, he was transferred to command a flotilla of E-boats; this newly formed unit began training in the Baltic before being transferred to the English Channel in May 1941. Bätge's boats were based in Cherbourg and Rotterdam. Upon the 4th Flotilla's arrival, the other three E-boat flotillas in occupied France were transferred to the Baltic in preparation for the invasion of the Soviet Union. Bätge's 4th Flotilla, which had just five boats operational owing to parts shortages and overuse, was to conduct the coastal campaign against Britain by itself. Bätge was instructed to keep his boats in action as much as possible to conceal the fact that the other three flotillas had been withdrawn. Throughout 1941, engine problems plagued the boats of the 4th Flotilla. Bätge had received orders to transfer his boats to Lorient in May to help cover the arrival of the battleship Bismarck, but bad weather delayed Bätge's departure and Bismarck was sunk in action. As a result, the 4th Flotilla remained in the Channel. On 30 May, three of the boats laid six mines off Great Yarmouth. The following month, Luftwaffe reconnaissance aircraft spotted what they believed to be the British aircraft carrier HMS Hermes, and Bätge sent four of his boats to attack the vessel on the morning of 3 June. They sank the ship, which turned out to be the merchant ship SS Mamari III, which had been converted into a decoy. Bätge's boats returned to minelaying operations for the rest of June, and these mines claimed three merchant ships that month.

In February 1942, Bätge's flotilla participated in Operation Cerberus, helping to cover the transfer of the battleships Scharnhorst and Gneisenau and the heavy cruiser Prinz Eugen through the Channel. By this time, his forces had been reinforced by the 2nd and 6th Flotillas. The three flotillas were responsible for escorting the heavy ships through the Dover Strait, and they rendezvoused off Cape Gris Nez.

== Awards ==
- Iron Cross (1939)
  - 2nd Class (15 September 1940)
  - 1st Class (11 June 1941)
- Destroyer War Badge (12 January 1941)
- Fast Attack Craft War Badge (30 March 1941)
- Wound Badge (1939) (7 October 1940)
- Knight's Cross of the Iron Cross (4 January 1942) as chief of the 4. Schnellbootflottille
