= Adalbert von Blanc =

German naval officer (1907–1976)

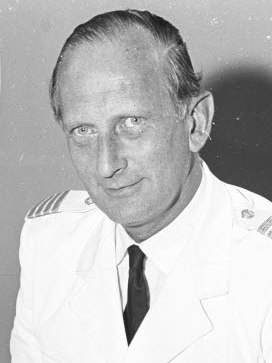
- Adalbert von Blanc in 1957
- Born: 11 July 1907; Wilhelmshaven, German Empire
- Died: 7 November 1976 (aged 69); Flensburg-Mürwik, West Germany
- Military career
- Allegiance: Weimar Republic (to 1933); Nazi Germany; West Germany
- Branch: Reichsmarine; Kriegsmarine; German Navy
- Service years: 1926–45, 1956–64
- Rank: Fregattenkapitän (Kriegsmarine); Flottillenadmiral (Bundesmarine)
- Units: SSS Niobe; Cruiser Emden; Cruiser Orion
- Commands: 9. Sicherungsdivision
- Conflicts: World War II
- Awards: Knight's Cross of the Iron Cross

Adalbert Pierre Louis Karl Erich Johann von Blanc (11 July 1907 – 7 November 1976) was a German naval officer during World War II and later an admiral in the West German Navy. During World War II he was awarded the Knight's Cross of the Iron Cross and served as 1st Officer on the auxiliary cruiser Orion.

== Life ==
Blanc was born in Wilhelmshaven as the son of Louis Ferdinand von Blanc (* 27. September 1878 in Berlin; d. 28. August 1914 KIA as first officer of the SMS Cöln). His grandfather was admiral Louis Karl Emil von Blanc (1832–1903). He joined Weimar era Reichsmarine in 1926 and was trained on the schooner "Niobe".

After World War II Blanc joined the British controlled German Mine Sweeping Administration on 15 August 1945. Blanc held command of the 1. Minenräum-Division (1st mine sweeping division) in Kiel. When the administration was disbanded on 31 December 1947, Blanc transferred to the follow organization called Minenräumverband Cuxhaven and became its chief.

On 18 December 1950, the students Georg von Hatzfeld and René Ledesdorff from Heidelberg occupied the isle of Helgoland to save it from destruction by the British occupying forces. The two were joined by Prince Hubertus zu Loewenstein-Wertheim-Freudenberg on 29 December 1950. The number of occupants had grown to 13 when Blanc was ordered by the British authorities to send two boats for the evacuation of Helgoland. Blanc refused to obey the order, even when he came under severe pressure and suspended from his command post. A legal proceeding against Blanc was initiated on 3 January 1951. The British court ruled that the order was not among his contractual obligations and he was re-instituted in his position as chief of the Minenräumverband Cuxhaven.

== Awards ==
- Iron Cross (1939) 2nd Class (15 September 1940) & 1st Class (17 October 1940)
- Wehrmacht Long Service Award 4th Class (2 October 1936) & 3rd Class (1 April 1938)
- Sudetenland Medal (20 December 1939)
- Auxiliary Cruiser Badge (23 August 1941)
- German Cross in Gold on 11 September 1942 as Korvettenkapitän in the 2. Sicherungs-Division
- Minesweeper War Badge (25 March 1943)
- Knight's Cross of the Iron Cross with Oak Leaves
  - Knight's Cross on 27 November 1944 as Fregattenkapitän and leader of the 9. Sicherungs-Division
  - (866th) Oak Leaves on 10 May 1945 as Fregattenkapitän and leader of the 9. Marine-Sicherungs-Division (Note: There is no reference of the Oak Leaves were awarded to Adalbert von Blanc in the German Federal Archives. His personal file contains a letter from Admiral August Thiele indicating that Blanc had been recommended for the Oak Leaves by Thiele. In a file of the German Minenräumdienst dated just after the capitulation is an entry "Knight's Cross of the Iron Cross with Oak Leaves" without indicating a date of the award. The sequential number "866" and date was assigned by the Association of Knight's Cross Recipients (AKCR). Blanc was member of the AKCR.)
- Grand Cross of the Order of Merit of the Federal Republic of Germany in 1964

== Footnotes ==
Military offices
Preceded by Korvettenkapitän Hugo Heydel	Commander of the 2nd Minesweeper Flotilla; September 1943 – March 1944	Succeeded by Fregattenkapitän Wilhelm Ambrosius
Preceded by Konteradmiral Kurt Böhmer	Chief of the 9. Sicherungsdivision; October 1944 – May 1945	Succeeded by —
