= Norwegian K-class submarine =

- HNoMS Kaura (U-995) at the Laboe Naval Memorial

Class overview
- Operators: Royal Norwegian Navy
- Built: 1940–1945
- In commission: 1948–1965
- Preserved: 1

General characteristics
- Class & type: German Type VII submarine
- Displacement: 769 tonnes (757 long tons) surfaced; 871 tonnes (857 long tons) submerged
- Length: 67.1 m (220 ft 2 in) o/a; 50.5 m (165 ft 8 in) pressure hull
- Beam: 6.2 m (20 ft 4 in) o/a; 4.7 m (15 ft 5 in) pressure hull
- Height: 9.6 m (31 ft 6 in)
- Draft: 4.74 m (15 ft 7 in)
- Propulsion: Diesel-electric; 2 × Diesel engines 3,200 shp; 2,400 kW; electric motors 740 shp; 552 kW
- Speed: 17.7 knots (32.8 km/h; 20.4 mph) surfaced; 7.6 knots (14.1 km/h; 8.7 mph) submerged
- Range: 14,500 nmi (26,900 km; 16,700 mi) at 10 knots (19 km/h; 12 mph) surfaced; 125 nmi (232 km; 144 mi) at 4 knots (7.4 km/h; 4.6 mph) submerged
- Test depth: 250 m (820 ft)
- Complement: 44-52 men
- Armament: 5 × torpedo tubes (4 bow, 1 stern), 14 torpedoes; 1 × 88 mm (3.5 in)/45 deck gun with 220 rounds

The Norwegian K class submarines are a class of three submarines the Royal Norwegian Navy received from Germany in 1948 as Allied war spoils. They were built as the Type VIIC/41 U-boat from 1940 to 1945. The ships were named HNoMS Kya (ex-U-926), Kinn (ex-U-1202), and Kaura (ex-U-995). Kaura was returned to Germany in 1971 as a museum ship. It is the only surviving Type VII in the world.

== Description ==
The German type VIIC/41 was a slightly modified version of the successful VIIC and had the same armament and engines. The difference was a stronger pressure hull and lighter machinery to compensate for the added steel in the hull, making them slightly lighter than the VIIC. A total of 91 were built.

== Bibliography ==
- Peterson, John (3 March 2015). The Norwegian K-Class: German U-boats in the Royal Norwegian Navy. ASIN B00U9U2BBC.
