= Kurt Böhmer =

- Rear admiral Böhmer in 1943
- Born: 31 December 1892
- Died: 1 October 1944 (aged 51) near Ventspils, Latvia
- Military career
- Allegiance: German Empire; Weimar Republic; Nazi Germany
- Branch: Kriegsmarine
- Service years: 1914–44
- Rank: Konteradmiral
- Units: U-17 and U-22; Hessen cruiser Admiral Scheer
- Conflicts: World War II
- Awards: Knight's Cross of the Iron Cross

Kurt Böhmer (31 December 1892 – 1 October 1944) was an officer in the Kriegsmarine of Nazi Germany who commanded the 9th Security Division from 17 June 1944. He was shot and killed on a hunting trip together with three foresters at Ventspils in Latvia by partisans on 1 October 1944. He was a recipient of the Knight's Cross of the Iron Cross.

== Awards ==
- Iron Cross (1914) 2nd Class (6 January 1916)
- Wehrmacht Long Service Award 4th to 2nd Class (2 October 1936)
- Komturkreuz des Spanisch-Marokkanischen Mehdauia-Ordens (13 May 1938)
- Wehrmacht Long Service Award 1st Class (1 April 1939)
- Spanish Cross in Silver (6 June 1939)
- Clasp to the Iron Cross (1939) 2nd Class (17 April 1940)
- Iron Cross (1939), 1st Class (21 April 1940)
- Minesweeper War Badge (17 January 1941)
- Order of the Cross of Liberty, 1st Class with Swords (12 October 1942)
- Knight's Cross of the Iron Cross on 6 October 1940 as Kapitän zur See and Chief of Staff of the Security Forces of the North Sea

Military offices
Preceded by —	Chief of the 9. Sicherungsdivision; June 1944 – October 1944	Succeeded by Fregattenkapitän Adalbert von Blanc
