= Wilhelm Meisel =

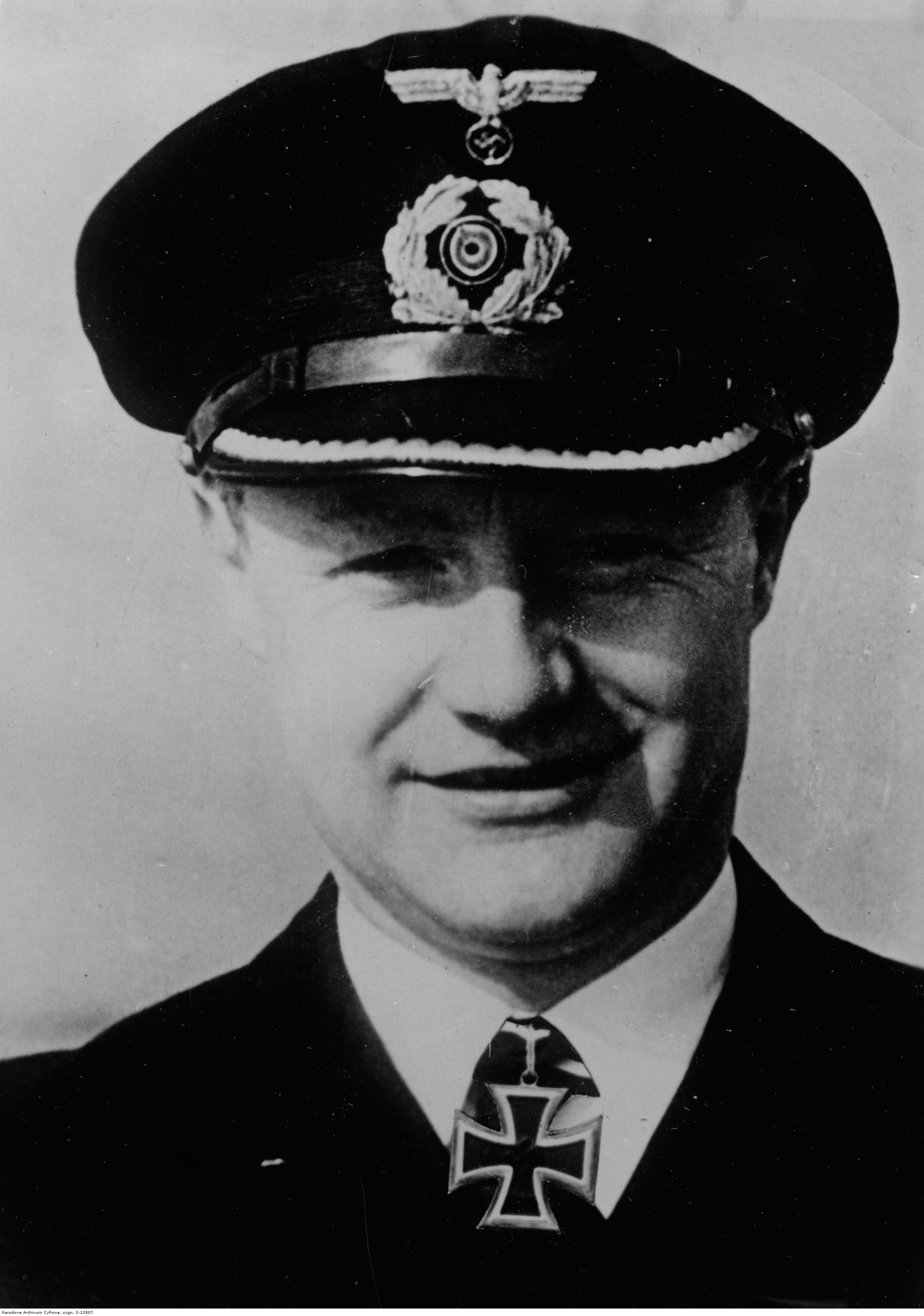
- Meisel in 1941
- Born: 4 November 1891; Zwickau
- Died: 7 September 1974 (aged 82); Mülheim
- Military career
- Allegiance: German Empire; Weimar Republic; Nazi Germany
- Branch: Imperial German Navy; Reichsmarine; Kriegsmarine
- Service years: 1913–1945
- Rank: Admiral
- Units: SMS Hertha; SMS Moltke; SMS Stralsund; SMS Kaiserin Augusta
- Commands: Heavy cruiser Admiral Hipper
- Conflicts: World War I World War II
- Awards: Knight's Cross of the Iron Cross

Wilhelm Meisel (4 November 1891 – 7 September 1974) was an Admiral of the Kriegsmarine of Nazi Germany during World War II and a recipient of the Knight's Cross of the Iron Cross.

Meisel was born in Zwickau and joined the Navy as a midshipman in 1913. During the First World War he served on the battlecruiser SMS Moltke, the light cruiser SMS Stralsund and the SMS Möwe. He later served as a staff officer on Torpedo boats and was interned in Scapa Flow. After the scuttling of the High Seas Fleet he was held as a POW by the British and repatriated in 1921.

During the 1920s Meisel commanded a torpedo boat flotilla and held several staff posts and commanded the German cruiser Karlsruhe in 1929.

During World War II Meisel commanded a destroyer flotilla in the invasion of Poland of 1939 and was appointed commander of the heavy cruiser Admiral Hipper in 1940. He was made Chief of Staff of Naval Group west in 1943 and Chief of Naval staff in 1943.

== Awards ==
- Iron Cross (1914) 2nd Class (17 March 1915) & 1st Class (15 April 1917)
- Hanseatic Cross of Hamburg (June 1916)
- Albert Order of Saxony, 2nd Class with Swords (May 1916)
- The Honour Cross of the World War 1914/1918 (December 1934)
- Spanish Cross in Silver (6 June 1939)
- Clasp to the Iron Cross (1939) 2nd Class (26 October 1939) & 1st Class (8 May 1940)
- Destroyer War Badge (July 1941)
- High Seas Fleet Badge (1 November 1941)
- Knight's Cross of the Iron Cross on 26 February 1941 as Kapitän zur See and commander of the heavy cruiser "Admiral Hipper"
- Order of the Rising Sun, 2nd class (Japan)

Military offices
Preceded by Konteradmiral Günther Lütjens	Acting Führer der Torpedoboote (F.d.T.) 1933–1939; 21 October 1939 – 25 October 1939	Succeeded by Kapitän zur See Friedrich Bonte
Preceded by Admiral Kurt Fricke	Chief of Staff of the Seekriegsleitung; 21 February 1943 – 30 April 1944	Succeeded by Chief of the Seekriegsleitung
