= Ulrich Heyse =

German U-boat commander

- Born: 20 September 1906; Berlin-Friedenau, German Empire
- Died: 19 November 1970 (aged 64); Flensburg, West Germany
- Military career
- Allegiance: Nazi Germany
- Branch: Kriegsmarine
- Service years: 1933–45
- Rank: Korvettenkapitän
- Units: cruiser Köln cruiser Emden destroyer Z6 Theodor Riedel
- Commands: U-128; 32nd U-boat Flotilla
- Conflicts: World War II: Battle of the Atlantic
- Awards: Knight's Cross of the Iron Cross

Ulrich Heyse (20 September 1906 in Berlin-Friedenau – 19 November 1970 in Flensburg) was a German U-boat commander in World War II and recipient of the Knight's Cross of the Iron Cross.

== Awards ==
- Wehrmacht Long Service Award 4th Class (4 October 1937)
- Iron Cross (1939)
  - 2nd Class (11 February 1940)
  - 1st Class (24 March 1942)
- Destroyer War Badge (19 October 1940)
- U-boat War Badge (1939) (24 March 1942)
- Knight's Cross of the Iron Cross on 21 January 1943 as Kapitänleutnant and commander of U-128
