= Kurt Fricke =

German admiral (1889–1945)

- Born: 8 November 1889; Berlin
- Died: 2 May 1945 (aged 55); Berlin
- Military career
- Allegiance: German Empire (to 1919); Weimar Republic (to 1933); Nazi Germany
- Branch: Imperial German Navy; Reichsmarine; Kriegsmarine
- Service years: 1910–45
- Rank: Admiral
- Units: SMS Hertha; SMS Moltke
- Conflicts: World War I; World War II
- Awards: Knight's Cross of the Iron Cross

Kurt Fricke (8 November 1889 – 2 May 1945) was an admiral with the Kriegsmarine (navy) of Nazi Germany during World War II and a recipient of the Knight's Cross of the Iron Cross.

== Biography ==
Fricke entered the Kaiserliche Marine as a cadet on 1 April 1910. He served on SMS Hertha during his cadetship and graduated from the Naval Academy at Mürwik. After graduating he was posted to the battlecruiser SMS Moltke. On 27 September 1913 Fricke was promoted to lieutenant. During World War I, Fricke served at the Battle of Dogger Bank. Fricke was promoted to Oberleutnant zur See in 1916 and transferred to torpedo boats. He served on G103 and G101. On 7 March 1918 he became an aide-de-camp to the commander of the torpedo boats, in which position he ended the war.

After the war he served in the administration of the German navy as adjutant to the commander in chief of the navy. From 1922 to 1924 he served on the I. Flottille, in which he commanded destroyers T139 and T148. In September 1924, Fricke became a company officer in a coastal defence unit. Fricke was promoted to Korvettenkapitän (corvette captain) in 1928. He served three years as a marine adjutant to the Reichswehrminister.

In 1929 Fricke was made commander of half a squadron of torpedo boats. On 16 September 1931 he became commander of the I. Torpedobootsflottille (1st Torpedo-boat Flotilla). In 1933 he became Führer der Torpedoboote (commander of the torpedo-boat branch). On 1 April 1934 Fricke was promoted to Fregattenkapitän (frigate captain). Fricke then was posted as chief of staff to the inspectorate of destroyer and mine-warfare in the rank of Kapitän zur See (captain at sea) (1935). From October 1936 to September 1937 he served at the Wehrmacht-Akademie. After this academic posting, Fricke served on the Oberkommando der Marine as Chief of the Operations department of the Seekriegsleitung (Naval War Staff). On 30 April 1939 Fricke became liaison officer to the commander-in-chief of the Luftwaffe, Hermann Göring.

After the start of the Second World War, Fricke was promoted to Konteradmiral (rear admiral) on 1 November 1939 and Vizeadmiral (vice admiral) on 1 June 1941. From 13 June 1941 to 20 February 1943 Fricke was Chief of Staff of the Seekriegsleitung. Promoted to Admiral on 1 April 1942, Fricke was named commander of the Marinegruppenkommando Süd (21 March 1943 – 11 December 1944). In December 1944 Fricke was placed in the Führerreserve. Fricke was killed on 2 May 1945 during the Battle of Berlin.

== Awards ==
- Iron Cross (1914)
  - 2nd Class (4 January 1915)
  - 1st Class (28 June 1916)
- Friedrich August Cross (Oldenburg)
  - 2nd Class (25 May 1916)
  - 1st Class (3 April 1918)
- Hanseatic Cross, Hamburg (14 June 1916)
- Knight's Cross of the House Order of Hohenzollern with Swords (5 March 1918)
- Knight's Cross, First Class of the Order of the Sword (Sweden, 12 July 1930)
- The Honour Cross of the World War 1914/1918 1914/1918 (1934)
- Sudetenland Medal (22 May 1939)
- Wehrmacht Long Service Award, 1st with 4th Class (2 October 1936)
- Order of Naval Merit, 3rd class in White (Spain, 21 August 1939)
- Clasp to the Iron Cross (1939)
  - 2nd Class (1 October 1939)
  - 1st Class (27 November 1939)
- Memel Medal (26 October 1939)
- Order of the Yugoslav Crown, 2nd class with Star (9 November 1939)
- Order of Military Merit (Bulgaria), 1st class with War Decoration (Bulgaria, 1942)
- Order of the Cross of Liberty, 1st class with Oak Leaves and Swords (Finland, March 25, 1942)
- Order of Michael the Brave, 3rd class (1 September 1942)
- Grand Cross of the Order of the Crown of King Zvonimir with swords (Croatia, 26 September 1942)
- Knight's Cross of the Iron Cross on 1 October 1942 as Admiral and chief-of-staff in Naval Operations (Seekriegsleitung) in the Naval High Command (Oberkommando der Marine)
- Grand Cross of the Order of the Star of Romania with swords and military band of virtue (7 October 1942)

Military offices
Preceded by Admiral Otto Schniewind	Chief of Staff of the Seekriegsleitung; 13 June 1941 – 20 February 1943	Succeeded by Admiral Wilhelm Meisel
