= Seekriegsleitung =

Higher command staff section of the German Navy during both World Wars

The Seekriegsleitung or SKL (Naval Warfare Command) was a higher command staff section of the Kaiserliche Marine and the Kriegsmarine of Germany during the World Wars.

== World War I ==
The SKL was established on August 27, 1918, on the initiative of Admiral Reinhard Scheer, who became its first commander, simultaneously to being the Chief of the German Imperial Admiralty Staff. It led the planning and execution of naval combat and directed the distribution of naval forces. Up to this point, that was done by several staffs and the individual theater commanders. When the war ended, the SKL was absorbed into the admiralty.

== World War II ==
The SKL was reestablished in 1937 and part of the Oberkommando der Marine (Naval High Command), the Commander-in-Chief also being the commander of the SKL with the Commander of the Naval Command Department (Marinekommandoamt) as the Chief of Staff. Though the competences of the SKL initially were equal to their role in World War I, they were narrowed when the Naval Command Department was split from it. The command was limited to except-domestic sea-areas, where the naval group commands did not possess the operational guidance. Also, the submarine war split and were, under the Befehlshaber der U-Boote (BdU, Commander of the submarines) subordinate to the Commander-in-Chief. In 1944, SKL was made responsible for the command of fleet units operating as transports, blockade runners, auxiliary cruisers and supply shipping.

== SKL command ==
The Commanders of the Seekriegsleitung were:

| No. | Portrait | Commander | Took office | Left office | Time in office |
|---|---|---|---|---|---|
| 1 | Reinhard Scheer | Admiral; Reinhard Scheer (1863–1928) | 28 August 1918 | 14 November 1918 | 78 days |
| 2 | Erich Raeder | Großadmiral; Erich Raeder (1876–1960) (as Commander-in-Chief) | 1 June 1935 | 30 January 1943 | 7 years, 243 days |
| 3 | Karl Dönitz | Großadmiral; Karl Dönitz (1891–1980) (as Commander-in-Chief) | 30 January 1943 | 1 May 1944 | 1 year, 92 days |
| 4 | Wilhelm Meisel | Admiral; Wilhelm Meisel (1891–1974) | 1 May 1944 | 22 May 1945 | 1 year, 21 days |

The Chiefs of Staff of the Seekriegsleitung were:

| No. | Portrait | Chief of Staff | Took office | Left office | Time in office |
|---|---|---|---|---|---|
| 1 | Günther Guse [de] | Vice Admiral; Günther Guse (1886–1953) | 1 October 1937 | 31 October 1938 | 1 year, 30 days |
| 2 | Otto Schniewind | Admiral; Otto Schniewind (1887–1964) | 31 October 1938 | 12 June 1941 | 2 years, 224 days |
| 3 | Kurt Fricke | Admiral; Kurt Fricke (1889–1945) | 13 June 1941 | 21 February 1943 | 1 year, 253 days |
| 4 | Wilhelm Meisel | Admiral; Wilhelm Meisel (1891–1974) | 21 February 1943 | 22 July 1945 | 2 years, 151 days |
