= Rolf Thomsen =

- Born: 6 May 1915
- Died: 26 March 2003 (aged 87)
- Military career
- Allegiance: Nazi Germany; West Germany
- Branch: Kriegsmarine; German Navy
- Service years: 1936–45; 1955–72
- Rank: Kapitänleutnant (Kriegsmarine); Flottillenadmiral (Bundesmarine)
- Units: battleship Schlesien; Kampfgeschwader 26
- Commands: U-1202
- Conflicts: World War II: Battle of the Atlantic
- Awards: Knight's Cross of the Iron Cross with Oak Leaves

Rolf Thomsen (6 May 1915 – 26 March 2003) was a U-boat commander in the Kriegsmarine of Nazi Germany during World War II and later served with the Bundesmarine. He received the Knight's Cross of the Iron Cross with Oak Leaves for his command of the German submarine U-1202.

Thomsen served as a naval aviator from 1939 until early 1943. He transferred to the U-boat service on 1 January 1944 and on 27 January 1944 commissioned U-1202. During two patrols, Thomsen reported his ship's attacks on a destroyer, two corvettes, six freighters and an escort carrier, for which he received the Knight's Cross with Oak Leaves. The loss of one of these ships, Dan Beard, was confirmed by the Allies.

Thomsen served in the Bundesmarine of West Germany since 1955, achieving the rank of Flotilla Admiral in 1966.

== Awards ==
- Iron Cross (1939( 2nd Class (25 November 1939) & 1st Class (17 May 1940)
- Wound Badge (1939) in Black (August 1940)
- Front Flying Clasp of the Luftwaffe for reconnaissance pilots in Silver (25 April 1941) & in Gold (26 March 1942)
- German Cross in Gold on 14 October 1943 as Kapitänleutnant on U-1004 in the 11. Unterseeboots-Flottille
- U-boat War Badge (1939) (3 January 1945)
- U-boat Front Clasp in Bronze (27 January 1945)
- Knight's Cross of the Iron Cross with Oak Leaves
  - Knight's Cross on 4 January 1945 as Kapitänleutnant and commander of U-1202
  - Oak Leaves on 29 April 1945 as Kapitänleutnant and commander of U-1202
- Commander's Cross, Order of Merit of the Federal Republic of Germany
