= Siegfried Wuppermann =

- Born: 15 December 1916; Berlin, German Empire
- Died: 15 April 2005 (aged 88); Osnabrück, Germany
- Military career
- Allegiance: Nazi Germany (to 1945); West Germany
- Branch: Kriegsmarine; German Navy
- Service years: 1936–45
- Rank: Kapitänleutnant (Kriegsmarine); Kapitän zur See of the Reserves (Bundesmarine)
- Conflicts: World War II
- Awards: Knight's Cross of the Iron Cross with Oak Leaves

Siegfried Wuppermann (15 December 1916 – 15 April 2005) was a captain with the Kriegsmarine during World War II and later served with the Bundesmarine. He was a recipient of the Knight's Cross of the Iron Cross with Oak Leaves of Nazi Germany.

== Military career ==
Siegfried Wuppermann was born on 15 December 1916 in Berlin. He joined the Kriegsmarine in 1936 and was transferred to the Schnellboot service in March 1939, where he took command of a boat in the 1. Schnellbootflottille. During the Invasion of Poland he participated on patrols in the North Sea, Baltic Sea and in the English Channel.

In early November 1940 he took charge of a Gruppe in the 3. Schnellbootflottille and took command of Schnellboot "S 60" on 21 December 1940. Siegfried saw action with this boat near Boulogne. In February 1941 he became acting commander of the 3. Schnellbootflottille because Friedrich Kemnade was on vacation. Wuppermann led a patrol on 7 March 1941 against Allied convoys.

On S 60 he participated in Operation Barbarossa. On the night of 21/22 June 1941, just after hostilities with the Soviet Union began, S 60 together with S 59 sank the cargo ship Gaisma off Ventspils, while on the night of 26/27 June, the 3. Schnellbootflottille clashed with Soviet naval forces on minelaying duties, with S 60 being credited (along with S 35) with sinking the Soviet minesweeper T208. Wuppermann received the Knight's Cross of the Iron Cross on 3 August 1941 during these battles.

After the 3. Schnellbootflottille was transferred to the Mediterranean to guard the Axis convoys to North Africa. Wuppermann received the coveted Oak Leaves to his Knight's Cross on 14 April 1943.

Kapitänleutnant Wuppermann helped establish the 21. and 22. Schnellbootflottillen in Eckernförde in May 1943 and was then transferred to the Stab of the Führer der Schnellboote. In March 1945 he took command of the 1. Schnellboot Division and fought with this unit in the Adriatic Sea.

After the war he joined the Bundesmarine. Siegfried Wuppermann died on 15 April 2005 in Osnabrück.

== Awards ==
- Iron Cross
  - 2nd Class (20 April 1940)
  - 1st Class (28 May 1940)
- Fast Attack Craft War Badge (16 December 1940)
  - with Diamonds (10 June 1943)
- War Cross for Military Valor with Swords (Italy, 10 May 1942)
- Bronze Medal of Military Valor (Italy, 21 May 1942)
- Silver Medal of Military Valor (Italy, 24 January 1943)
- Knight's Cross of the Iron Cross with Oak Leaves
  - Knight's Cross on 3 August 1941 as Oberleutnant zur See and commander of "S-60" in the 3. Schnellbootflottille (Note: According to Scherzer as commander of Schnellboot S-60.)
  - 226th Oak Leaves on 14 April 1943 as Oberleutnant zur See and commander of "S-56" in the 3. Schnellbootflottille (Note: According to Scherzer as commander of Schnellboot S-56.)
