= German submarine U-128 (1941) =

German World War II submarine

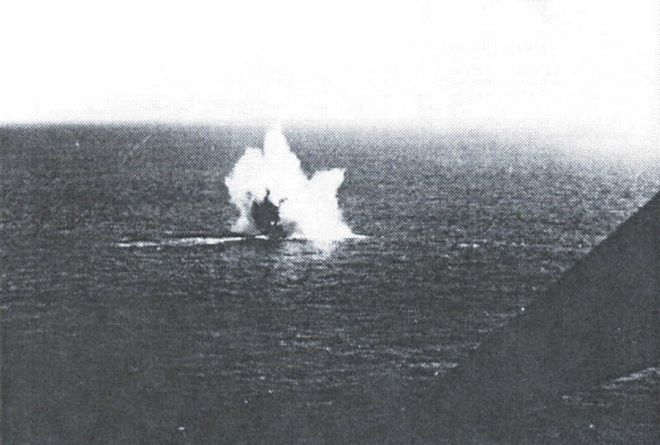
- Air attack on U-128

History

Nazi Germany
- Name: U-128
- Ordered: 7 August 1939
- Builder: DeSchiMAG AG Weser in Bremen
- Yard number: 991
- Laid down: 10 July 1940
- Launched: 20 February 1941
- Commissioned: 12 May 1941 by Ulrich Heyse
- Fate: Sunk, 17 May 1943

General characteristics
- Class & type: Type IXC submarine
- Displacement: 1,120 t (1,100 long tons) surfaced; 1,232 t (1,213 long tons) submerged
- Length: 76.76 m (251 ft 10 in) o/a; 58.75 m (192 ft 9 in) pressure hull
- Beam: 6.76 m (22 ft 2 in) o/a; 4.40 m (14 ft 5 in) pressure hull
- Height: 9.60 m (31 ft 6 in)
- Draught: 4.70 m (15 ft 5 in)
- Installed power: 4,400 PS (3,200 kW; 4,300 bhp) (diesels); 1,000 PS (740 kW; 990 shp) (electric)
- Propulsion: 2 shafts; 2 × diesel engines; 2 × electric motors
- Speed: 18.3 knots (33.9 km/h; 21.1 mph) surfaced; 7.3 knots (13.5 km/h; 8.4 mph) submerged
- Range: 13,450 nmi (24,910 km; 15,480 mi) at 10 knots (19 km/h; 12 mph) surfaced; 64 nmi (119 km; 74 mi) at 4 knots (7.4 km/h; 4.6 mph) submerged
- Test depth: 230 m (750 ft)
- Complement: 4 officers, 44 enlisted
- Armament: 6 × torpedo tubes (4 bow, 2 stern); 22 × 53.3 cm (21 in) torpedoes; 1 × 10.5 cm (4.1 in) SK C/32 deck gun (180 rounds); 1 × 3.7 cm (1.5 in) SK C/30 AA gun; 1 × twin 2 cm FlaK 30 AA guns

Service record
- Part of: 2nd U-boat Flotilla; 12 May 1941 – 17 May 1943
- Identification codes: M 41 096
- Commanders: Kptlt. Ulrich Heyse; 12 May 1941 – 28 February 1943; Oblt.z.S. Hermann Steinert; 1 March – 17 May 1943
- Operations: 6 patrols: 1st patrol; 11 – 24 December 1941; 2nd patrol; 8 January – 23 March 1942; 3rd patrol; 25 April – 22 July 1942; 4th patrol; 2 – 10 September 1942; 5th patrol; 14 September 1942 – 15 January 1943; 6th patrol; 6 April – 17 May 1943
- Victories: 12 merchant ships sunk (83,639 GRT)

German submarine U-128 was a Type IXC U-boat of Nazi Germany's Kriegsmarine during World War II. She was sunk 17 May 1943, by American action.

== Design ==
German Type IXC submarines were slightly larger than the original Type IXBs. U-128 had a displacement of 1,120 tonnes (1,100 long tons) when at the surface and 1,232 tonnes (1,213 long tons) while submerged. The U-boat had a total length of 76.76 m (251 ft 10 in), a pressure hull length of 58.75 m (192 ft 9 in), a beam of 6.76 m (22 ft 2 in), a height of 9.60 m (31 ft 6 in), and a draught of 4.70 m (15 ft 5 in). The submarine was powered by two MAN M 9 V 40/46 supercharged four-stroke, nine-cylinder diesel engines producing a total of 4,400 metric horsepower (3,240 kW; 4,340 shp) for use while surfaced, two Siemens-Schuckert 2 GU 345/34 double-acting electric motors producing a total of 1,000 metric horsepower (740 kW; 990 shp) for use while submerged. She had two shafts and two 1.92 m (6 ft) propellers. The boat was capable of operating at depths of up to 230 metres (750 ft).

The submarine had a maximum surface speed of 18.3 knots (33.9 km/h; 21.1 mph) and a maximum submerged speed of 7.3 knots (13.5 km/h; 8.4 mph). When submerged, the boat could operate for 63 nautical miles (117 km; 72 mi) at 4 knots (7.4 km/h; 4.6 mph); when surfaced, she could travel 13,450 nautical miles (24,910 km; 15,480 mi) at 10 knots (19 km/h; 12 mph). U-128 was fitted with six 53.3 cm (21 in) torpedo tubes (four fitted at the bow and two at the stern), 22 torpedoes, one 10.5 cm (4.13 in) SK C/32 naval gun, 180 rounds, and a 3.7 cm (1.5 in) SK C/30 as well as a 2 cm (0.79 in) C/30 anti-aircraft gun. The boat had a complement of forty-eight.

== Service history ==
Ordered on 7 August 1939 from DeSchiMAG AG Weser in Bremen, U-128 was laid down on 10 July 1940, launched on 20 February 1941 and commissioned by Kapitänleutnant Ulrich Heyse on 12 May 1941.

The boat was a training vessel in the second flotilla until 30 November 1941 based in Wilhelmshaven. She was then based in Lorient.

During her six completed war patrols, U-128 sank 12 ships, for a total of 83,639 tons. On 1 March 1943 command was transferred to Kptlt. Hermann Steinert, who commanded her until her loss a few months later.

== Fate ==
On 17 May 1943, while operating in the South Atlantic near Pernambuco, two Mariner flying boats, PBM 74-P5 and PBM-74-P6 of the US Navy Patrol Squadron VP-74, made U-128 surface with depth charges. Two US Navy destroyers (USS Jouett and Moffett) also hit her with 5-inch gunfire. The crew opened the submarine's seacocks as they abandoned ship, scuttling the submarine. The final toll was seven dead but there were 47 survivors.

== Summary of raiding history ==
Date	Ship Name	Nationality	Tonnage (GRT)	Fate	Position	Deaths
19 February 1942	Pan Massachusetts	United States	8,202	Sunk	28°27′N 80°08′W	20
22 February 1942	Cities Service Empire	United States	8,103	Sunk	28°25′N 80°02′W	14
5 March 1942	O.A. Knudsen	Norway	11,007	Sunk	26°17′N 75°50′W	2
13 May 1942	Denpark	United Kingdom	3,491	Sunk	22°28′N 28°10′W	21
8 June 1942	South Africa	Norway	9,234	Sunk	12°47′N 49°44′W	6
21 June 1942	West Ira	United States	5,681	Sunk	12°28′N 57°05′W	1
23 June 1942	Andrea Brøvig	Norway	10,173	Sunk	12°10′N 59°10′W	0
27 June 1942	Polybius	United States	7,041	Sunk	10°55′N 57°40′W	10
8 November 1942	Maloja	Norway	6,400	Sunk	11°58′N 27°08′W	2
10 November 1942	Cerinthus	United Kingdom	3,878	Sunk	12°27′N 27°45′W	20
10 November 1942	Start Point	United Kingdom	5,293	Sunk	13°12′N 27°27′W	2
5 December 1942	Teesbank	United Kingdom	5,136	Sunk	03°33′N 29°35′W	1

== Bibliography ==
- Busch, Rainer; Röll, Hans-Joachim (1999). German U-boat commanders of World War II : a biographical dictionary. Translated by Brooks, Geoffrey. London, Annapolis, Md: Greenhill Books, Naval Institute Press. ISBN 1-55750-186-6.
- Busch, Rainer; Röll, Hans-Joachim (1999). Deutsche U-Boot-Verluste von September 1939 bis Mai 1945 [German U-boat losses from September 1939 to May 1945]. Der U-Boot-Krieg (in German). Vol. IV. Hamburg, Berlin, Bonn: Mittler. ISBN 3-8132-0514-2.
- Gröner, Erich; Jung, Dieter; Maass, Martin (1991). U-boats and Mine Warfare Vessels. German Warships 1815–1945. Vol. 2. Translated by Thomas, Keith; Magowan, Rachel. London: Conway Maritime Press. ISBN 0-85177-593-4.
