= German submarine U-1202 =

German World War II submarine

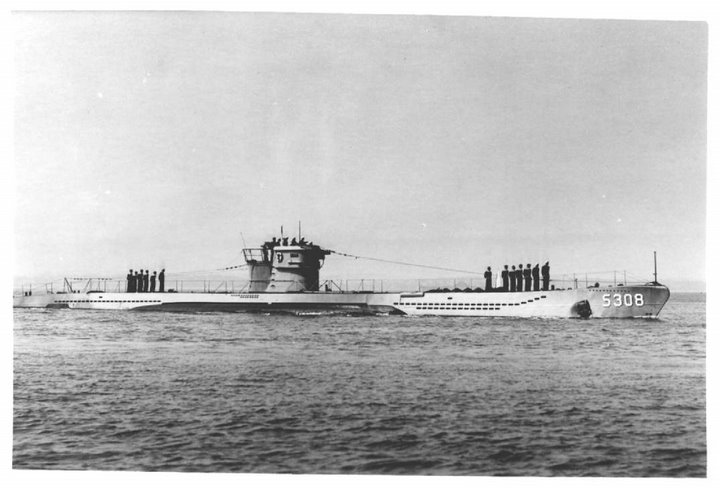
- U-1202 as HNoMS Kinn underway circa 1960

History

Nazi Germany
- Name: U-1202
- Ordered: 14 October 1941
- Builder: Schichau-Werke, Danzig
- Yard number: 1572
- Laid down: 28 April 1943
- Launched: 11 November 1943
- Commissioned: 27 January 1944
- Fate: Surrendered on 9 May 1945 in Norway and became the Norwegian submarine HNoMS Kinn.

Norway
- Name: HNoMS Kinn
- Acquired: 9 May 1945
- Commissioned: 1 July 1951
- Decommissioned: 1 June 1961
- Fate: Broken up in Hamburg in 1963

General characteristics
- Class & type: Type VIIC submarine
- Displacement: 769 tonnes (757 long tons) surfaced; 871 t (857 long tons) submerged
- Length: 67.10 m (220 ft 2 in) o/a; 50.50 m (165 ft 8 in) pressure hull
- Beam: 6.20 m (20 ft 4 in) o/a; 4.70 m (15 ft 5 in) pressure hull
- Draught: 4.74 m (15 ft 7 in)
- Installed power: 2,800–3,200 PS (2,100–2,400 kW; 2,800–3,200 bhp) (diesels); 750 PS (550 kW; 740 shp) (electric)
- Propulsion: 2 shafts; 2 × diesel engines; 2 × electric motors
- Speed: 17.7 knots (32.8 km/h; 20.4 mph) surfaced; 7.6 knots (14.1 km/h; 8.7 mph) submerged
- Range: 8,500 nmi (15,700 km; 9,800 mi) at 10 knots (19 km/h; 12 mph) surfaced; 80 nmi (150 km; 92 mi) at 4 knots (7.4 km/h; 4.6 mph) submerged
- Test depth: 230 m (750 ft); Crush depth: 250–295 m (820–968 ft)
- Complement: 4 officers, 40–56 enlisted
- Armament: 5 × 53.3 cm (21 in) torpedo tubes (4 bow, 1 stern); 14 × torpedoes or 26 TMA mines; 1 × 8.8 cm (3.46 in) deck gun (220 rounds); 1 × 3.7 cm (1.5 in) Flak M42 AA gun; 2 × twin 2 cm (0.79 in) C/30 anti-aircraft guns

Service record (Kriegsmarine)
- Part of: 8th U-boat Flotilla; 27 January – 31 August 1944; 11th U-boat Flotilla; 1 September 1944 – 8 May 1945
- Identification codes: M 49 757
- Commanders: Kptlt. Rolf Thomsen; 27 January 1944 – 9 May 1945
- Operations: 2 patrols: 1st patrol: 30 October 1944 – 1 January 1945; 2nd patrol: 4 March – 26 April 1945
- Victories: 1 merchant ship sunk (7,176 GRT)

German submarine U-1202 was a Type VIIC U-boat built for Nazi Germany's Kriegsmarine for service during World War II. She was laid down on 28 April 1943 by Schichau-Werke, Danzig as yard number 1572, launched on 11 November 1943 and commissioned on 27 January 1944 under Kapitänleutnant Rolf Thomsen.

== Design ==
German Type VIIC submarines were preceded by the shorter Type VIIB submarines. U-1202 had a displacement of 769 tonnes (757 long tons) when at the surface and 871 tonnes (857 long tons) while submerged. She had a total length of 67.10 m (220 ft 2 in), a pressure hull length of 50.50 m (165 ft 8 in), a beam of 6.20 m (20 ft 4 in), a height of 9.60 m (31 ft 6 in), and a draught of 4.74 m (15 ft 7 in). The submarine was powered by two Germaniawerft F46 four-stroke, six-cylinder supercharged diesel engines producing a total of 2,800 to 3,200 metric horsepower (2,060 to 2,350 kW; 2,760 to 3,160 shp) for use while surfaced, two AEG GU 460/8–27 double-acting electric motors producing a total of 750 metric horsepower (550 kW; 740 shp) for use while submerged. She had two shafts and two 1.23 m (4 ft) propellers. The boat was capable of operating at depths of up to 230 metres (750 ft).

The submarine had a maximum surface speed of 17.7 knots (32.8 km/h; 20.4 mph) and a maximum submerged speed of 7.6 knots (14.1 km/h; 8.7 mph). When submerged, the boat could operate for 80 nautical miles (150 km; 92 mi) at 4 knots (7.4 km/h; 4.6 mph); when surfaced, she could travel 8,500 nautical miles (15,700 km; 9,800 mi) at 10 knots (19 km/h; 12 mph). U-1202 was fitted with five 53.3 cm (21 in) torpedo tubes (four fitted at the bow and one at the stern), fourteen torpedoes, one 8.8 cm (3.46 in) SK C/35 naval gun, (220 rounds), one 3.7 cm (1.5 in) Flak M42 and two twin 2 cm (0.79 in) C/30 anti-aircraft guns. The boat had a complement of between forty-four and sixty.

== Service history ==
The boat's career began with training at 8th U-boat Flotilla on 27 January 1944, followed by active service on 1 September 1944 as part of the 11th Flotilla for the remainder of her service.

In two patrols she sank one merchant ship for a total of 7,176 gross register tons (GRT).

=== Wolfpacks ===
U-1202 did not take part in any wolfpacks.

=== Fate ===
U-1202 surrendered on 9 May 1945 in Norway and, after being repaired, became Norwegian submarine HNoMS Kinn. She was not transferred to UK at the end of the war, as part of Operation Deadlight, since she was considered unseaworthy.

She served in the Royal Norwegian Navy until 1961; eventually being broken up in 1963.

== Summary of raiding history ==
Date	Ship Name	Nationality	Tonnage (GRT)	Fate
10 December 1944	Dan Beard	United States	7,176	Sunk

== See also ==
- List of Royal Norwegian Navy ships#Navy vessels (past)
- Norwegian K-class submarine

== Bibliography ==
- Busch, Rainer; Röll, Hans-Joachim (1999). German U-boat commanders of World War II : a biographical dictionary. Translated by Brooks, Geoffrey. London, Annapolis, Md: Greenhill Books, Naval Institute Press. ISBN 1-55750-186-6.
- Busch, Rainer; Röll, Hans-Joachim (1999). Deutsche U-Boot-Verluste von September 1939 bis Mai 1945 [German U-boat losses from September 1939 to May 1945]. Der U-Boot-Krieg (in German). Vol. IV. Hamburg, Berlin, Bonn: Mittler. ISBN 3-8132-0514-2.
- Gröner, Erich; Jung, Dieter; Maass, Martin (1991). German Warships 1815–1945, U-boats and Mine Warfare Vessels. Vol. 2. Translated by Thomas, Keith; Magowan, Rachel. London: Conway Maritime Press. ISBN 0-85177-593-4.
- Sharpe, Peter (1998). U-Boat Fact File. Great Britain: Midland Publishing. ISBN 1-85780-072-9.
