= Götz Freiherr von Mirbach =

German baron and sailor

- Born: 12 September 1915; Berlin-Charlottenburg, German Empire
- Died: 6 August 1968 (aged 52); Hamburg, West Germany
- Military career
- Allegiance: Nazi Germany
- Branch: Kriegsmarine
- Rank: Korvettenkapitän
- Conflicts: Spanish Civil War; World War II: Battle of Lyme Bay
- Awards: Knight's Cross of the Iron Cross with Oak Leaves

Götz Freiherr von Mirbach (12 September 1915 – 6 August 1968) was a naval captain with the Kriegsmarine during World War II. He was a recipient of the Knight's Cross of the Iron Cross with Oak Leaves of Nazi Germany.

Mirbach was assigned to the 1. Schnellbootflottille attacking enemy shipping in the English Channel, sinking a British destroyer and three armed merchant vessels among others.

He was later promoted to Korvettenkapitän and served as commander of the 9. Schnellbootflottille; taking part in the attack on Exercise Tiger on 28–29 April 1944.

Mirbach participated in the 1952 Summer Olympics in Helsinki, Finland. Together with Hans Kadelbach, he was a member of the German 6 metre class sailing crew which finished in tenth place.

== Awards ==
- Iron Cross (1939)
  - 2nd Class (30 April 1940)
  - 1st Class (28 May 1940)
- Service Award (Dienstauszeichnung) 4th Class (5 April 1939)
- German Cross in Gold on 10 November 1942 as Kapitänleutnant on S-48 in the 4. Schnellbootflottille
- Knight's Cross of the Iron Cross with Oak Leaves
  - Knight's Cross on 14 August 1940 as Oberleutnant zur See and commander of Schnellboot S-21 in the 1. Schnellbootflottille (Note: According to Scherzer as commander of Schnellboot S-21.)
  - Oak Leaves on 14 June 1944 as Kapitänleutnant and chief of the 9. Schnellbootflottille
- Fast Attack Craft War Badge with Diamonds (14 June 1944)
