= Bernd Klug =

German navy admiral (1914-1975)

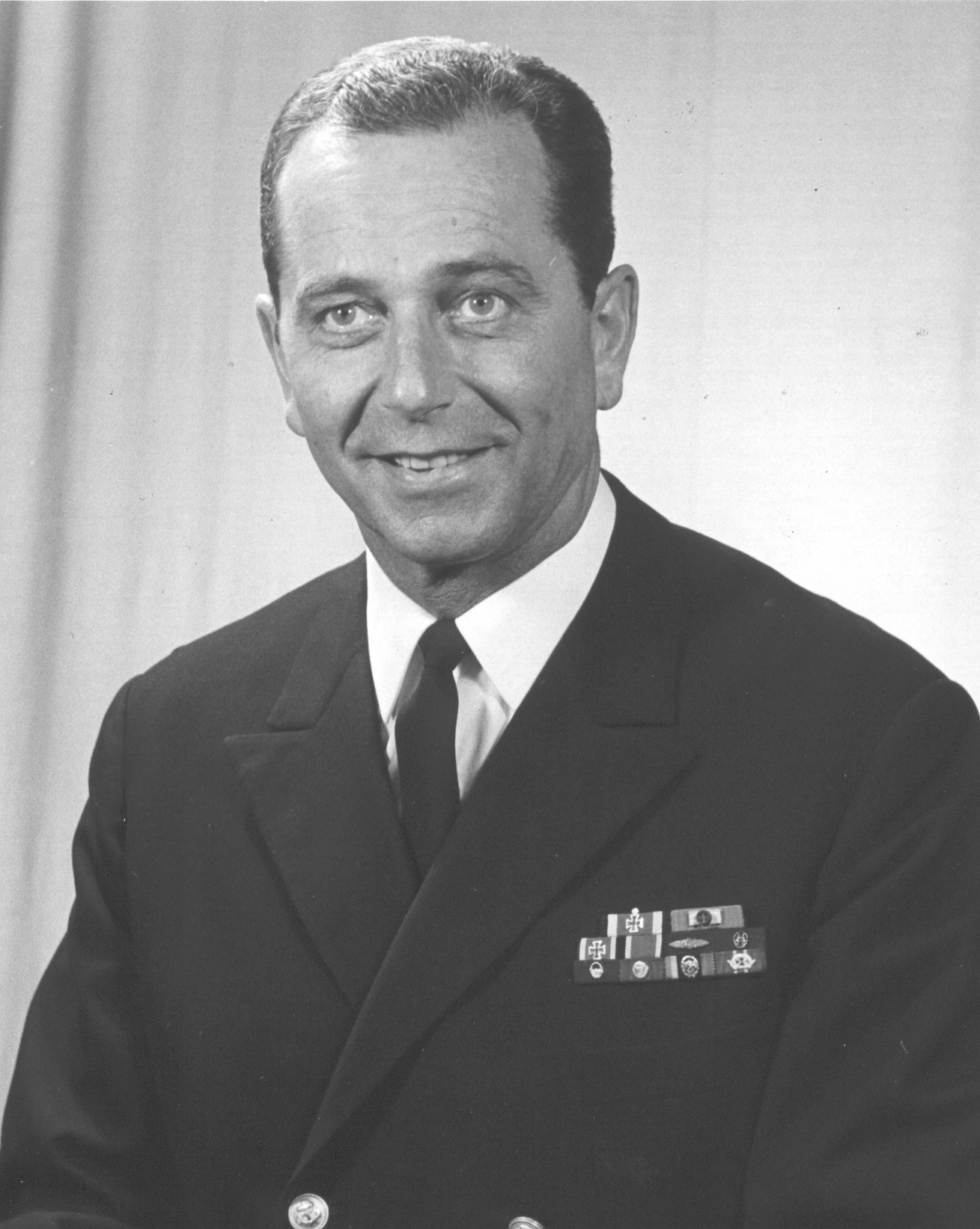
- Born: 12 December 1914; Wuppertal, German Empire
- Died: 15 June 1975 (aged 60); Kiel, West Germany
- Military career
- Allegiance: Nazi Germany; West Germany
- Branch: Kriegsmarine; German Navy
- Service years: 1933–1945, 1956–1968
- Rank: Flottillenadmiral
- Conflicts: Spanish Civil War; World War II
- Awards: Knight's Cross of the Iron Cross with Oak Leaves

Bernd Klug (12 December 1914 – 15 June 1975) was an admiral in the West German Navy. During World War II, he served in the Kriegsmarine and was a recipient of the Knight's Cross of the Iron Cross with Oak Leaves of Nazi Germany.

== Career ==
Klug joined Nazi Germany's Reichsmarine on 1 April 1933. He received his training aboard the school ship SSS Gorch Fock and the light cruiser Karlsruhe. Klug sailed on Karlsruhe's third training cruise. Karlsruhe left Wilhelmshaven on 14 October 1933 returning to Kiel on 16 June 1934. While stationed on Karlsruhe, he advanced in rank to Gefreiter on 1 April 1934.

He was posted to the Naval Academy at Mürwik on 28 June 1934. During his vacation he was promoted to Officer Cadet on 1 July 1934. The main cadet course lasted until 18 April 1935 and was interrupted by two navigational training cruises, the first on the tender Nordsee (10–16 October 1934) and the tender Saar (31 January – 6 February 1935).

Klug led E-boats on 28 April 1944 in an attack against Convoy T-4 consisting of LSTs during the Allied large-scale rehearsals for the D-Day invasion of Normandy, dubbed Exercise Tiger. During the attack, German E-boats sank USS LST-507 and 531, and damaged 289, resulting in the deaths of 749 American servicemen.

== Awards ==
- Spanish Cross in Bronze without Swords (6 June 1939)
- Iron Cross (1939) 2nd Class (10 April 1940) & 1st Class (7 August 1940)
- Wound Badge (1939) in Black (25 April 1940)
- Fast Attack Craft War Badge (16 December 1940); with Diamonds (1 January 1944)
- Knight's Cross of the Iron Cross with Oak Leaves
  - Knight's Cross on 12 March 1941 as Kapitänleutnant and commander of Schnellboot S-28 in the 1. Schnellbootflottille
  - Oak Leaves on 1 January 1944 as chief of the 5. Schnellbootflottille
- Commanders Cross of the French Legion of Honour (1960)

Military offices
Preceded by none	Commander of 5. Schnellbootflottille; 15 July 1941 – 1 June 1944	Succeeded by Kapitänleutnant Kurt Johannsen
Preceded by Carl-Heinz Birnbacher	Commander of Kommando der Schnellboote; 1962 – 1964	Succeeded by Jens Matzen
Preceded by Kapitän zur See Karl Schneider-Pungs	Commander of the Naval Academy Mürwik; 1 October 1966 – 31 March 1968	Succeeded by Kapitän zur See Reinhard Ostertag
