= Carl-Heinz Birnbacher =

German admiral (1910–1991)

- Born: 26 May 1910; Villach
- Died: 5 December 1991 (aged 81)
- Military career
- Allegiance: Nazi Germany; West Germany
- Branch: Kriegsmarine; German Navy
- Rank: Konteradmiral
- Commands: Destroyer Z25; Destroyer Z24
- Conflicts: World War II
- Awards: Knight's Cross of the Iron Cross

Carl-Heinz Birnbacher (26 May 1910 – 5 December 1991) was an admiral in the West German Navy. During World War II, he served in the Kriegsmarine and was a recipient of the Knight's Cross of the Iron Cross of Nazi Germany.

== Awards ==
- Iron Cross (1939) 2nd Class (9 April 1940) & 1st Class (20 April 1940)
- Wound Badge in Black (15 May 1940)
- German Cross in Gold on 10 November 1942 as Kapitänleutnant in the 1. Schnellbootsflottille
- Knight's Cross of the Iron Cross on 17 June 1940 as Kapitänleutnant and chief of the 1. Schnellbootsflottille
- Großes Bundesverdienstkreuz (September 1970)

Military offices
Preceded by Korvettenkapitän Günter Schlichting	Commander of the Marinestützpunktkommando Cuxhaven; October 1956 – April 1957	Succeeded by Fregattenkapitän Harald Jeppener-Haltenhoff
Preceded by Fregattenkapitän Trummer	Commander of German destroyer Z-1 (formerly USS Anthony); April 1959 – October 1960	Succeeded by Fregattenkapitän Werner Winter
Preceded by Friedrich Kemnade	Commander of Kommando der Schnellboote; 1960 – 1962	Succeeded by Bernd Klug
