= Minesweeper War Badge =

Minesweepers, Sub-Chasers and Escort-Vessel War Badge Kriegsabzeichen für Minensuch-, U-Boot-Jagd- und Sicherungsverbände
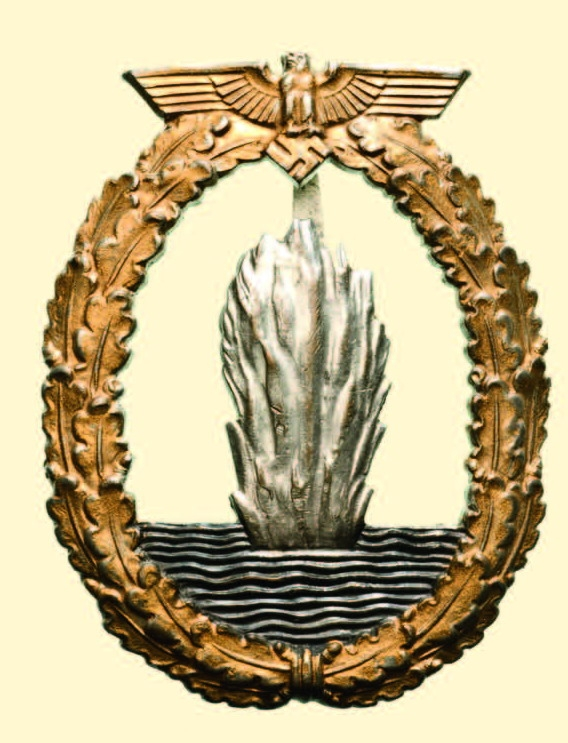
- Type: Badge
- Awarded for: service in Kriegsmarine minesweepers
- Presented by: Nazi Germany
- Eligibility: Military personnel
- Campaign: World War II
- Status: Obsolete
- Established: 31 August 1940
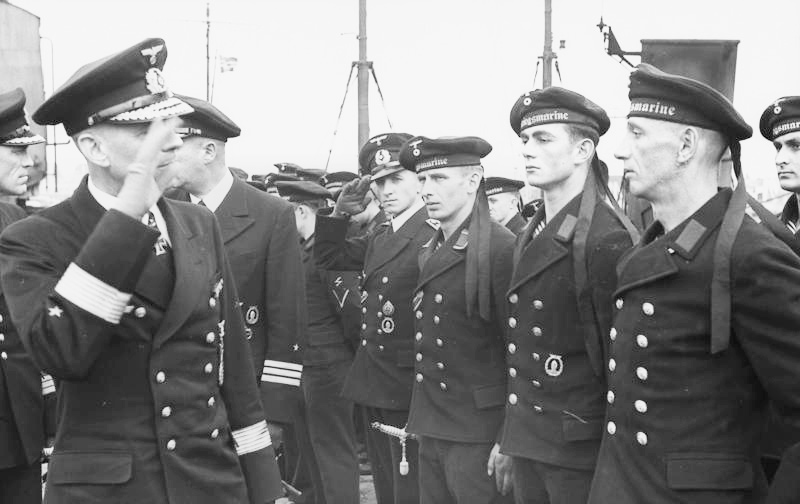
- Friedrich Ruge inspecting sailors wearing the Minesweeper War Badge

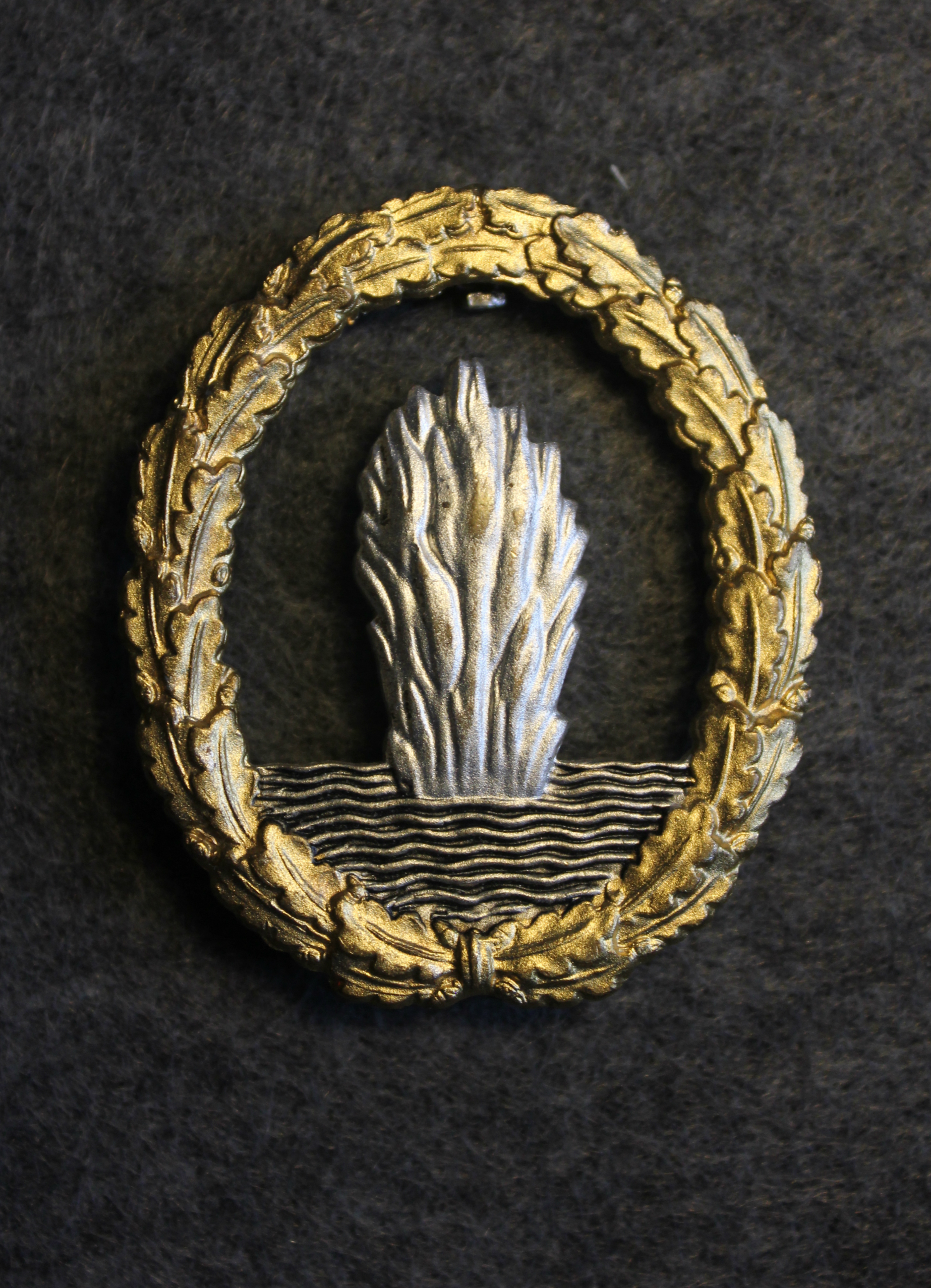
A 1957 pattern de-Nazified Minesweeper War Badge

The Minesweeper War Badge or Minesweepers, Sub-Chasers and Escort-Vessel War Badge (German: Kriegsabzeichen für Minensuch-, U-Boot-Jagd- und Sicherungsverbände) was a World War II German military decoration awarded to Kriegsmarine members for service on minesweepers vessels. The award was instituted on 31 August 1940 by Grand Admiral Erich Raeder. It was first awarded on 28 November 1940.

== Design ==
The medal, designed by Otto Placzek of Berlin, consists of an outer laurel wreath of oak leaves with the national emblem of an eagle clutching a swastika (both golden coloured) at its apex. The central area features a representation of a sea mine exploding. The medal was first produced in bronze and later in zinc. Inferior quality late-war versions can appear a dull gray as the gold gilt was known to wear off.

The medal was worn on the lower part of the left breast pocket of the naval service tunic, underneath the 1st class Iron Cross if awarded, or equivalent grade award.

== Criteria for award ==
Award of this medal could derive from:

- The candidate had completed at least three operational sorties
- Wounded during an operational sortie
- Ship he was sailing in an operation was sunk due to enemy action
- Participated in a specific sortie that proved very successfully
- Had shown exemplary conduct in the execution of his duties over a six-month period
- Completed a specially dangerous mission in a mined area
- Served on escort duty for 25 days or more

== Post-War ==
After the official establishment of the West German government in 1949, and the sub-subsequent founding of the new German Navy in 1956, the Bundesmarine found many of its ships crewed by former Kriegsmarines.

Following a similar directive as the rest of the Bundeswehr, the Bundesmarine allowed several de-nazified versions of World War II medals, which had been previously earned and issued, to be worn. The decision to allow re-issued versions of these medals to be worn was made after a Federal decision in 1957. Thereafter, a select number of medals pertaining to combat and civilian service with the Wehrmacht (Nazi party medals were not re-issued) were produced. These medals were re-issued to retired and active members of the former Kriegsmarine. Members of the Bundesmarine who had not served during the war were not eligible to receive this medal.

These 1957 re-issued medals are identical in most respect to their wartime equivalents, the most prominent difference being the removal of the German eagle and Swastika. Post-war Minesweeper medals were produced by a wide variety of German medal manufacturers between the 1960s–1980s. These new medals often do not bear a makers mark. They also sometimes utilize some newer medals in their construction.
