= Rudolf Petersen (Kapitän zur See) =

German naval officer (1905–1983)

- Born: 15 May 1905; Als, German Empire
- Died: 2 January 1983 (aged 77); Flensburg, Schleswig-Holstein, West Germany
- Burial place: Cemetery Adelby in Flensburg
- Military career
- Allegiance: Weimar Republic; Nazi Germany; West Germany
- Branch: Reichsmarine; Kriegsmarine; Bundesnachrichtendienst
- Service years: 1925–1945
- Rank: Kommodore
- Conflicts: World War II
- Awards: Knight's Cross of the Iron Cross with Oak Leaves

Rudolf Petersen (15 June 1905 – 2 January 1983) was a German naval officer during World War II. Petersen, in his role as Commodore, was the head of the court of what might have been the last desertion-trial of Nazi Germany. Matrose Fritz Wehrmann, age 26 from Leipzig, Funker Alfred Gail, age 20 from Kassel, and Obergefreiter Martin Schilling, age 22 from Ostfriesland were executed on board Buéa on 10 May 1945 two days after the unconditional surrender of Germany.

The accused had received news of the German capitulation to the British forces on 4 May 1945. On 6 May 1945 they left their stations on Svendborg on Fünen to get to the mainland. They were caught by the Danish Police and handed over to the German authorities on Fünen.

In 1953, Petersen and others responsible for the martial were acquitted of manslaughter charges.

In 1982, Petersen suffered severe shock and a cerebral hemorrhage after young people threw firecrackers in his face after he opened his apartment door on New Year's Eve. He died as a result on January 2, 1983.

== Awards ==
- Iron Cross (1939) 2nd Class (1940) & 1st Class (28 May 1940)
- Fast Attack Craft War Badge (19 March 1942) with Diamonds (13 June 1944)
- Knight's Cross of the Iron Cross with Oak Leaves
  - Knight's Cross on 4 August 1940 as Korvettenkapitän and chief of the 2. Schnellbootflottille
  - Oak Leaves on 13 June 1944 as Kapitän zur See and leader of the Schnellboote (FdS)

Military offices
Preceded by none	Commander of 2. Schnellbootflottille; 1 August 1938 – 20 October 1941	Succeeded by Korvettenkapitän Klaus Feldt
