= Werner Töniges =

- Born: 7 January 1910; Oberhausen
- Died: 25 January 1995 (aged 85); Essen
- Military career
- Allegiance: Nazi Germany
- Branch: Kriegsmarine
- Service years: 1935–45
- Rank: Korvettenkapitän
- Units: Schleswig-Holstein pocket battleship Admiral Graf Spee
- Commands: Schnellboot "S 24", "S 26" and "S 102"
- Conflicts: Spanish Civil War; World War II
- Awards: Knight's Cross of the Iron Cross with Oak Leaves

Werner Töniges (7 January 1910 – 25 January 1995) was a Korvettenkapitän with the Kriegsmarine during World War II. He was also a recipient of the Knight's Cross of the Iron Cross with Oak Leaves. He sailed with the Schnellboot "S 24", "S 26" and "S 102", sinking eighteen ships on 281 combat patrols, for a total of 86,200 gross register tons (GRT) of Allied shipping.

== Military career ==
Werner Töniges transferred from the Handelsmarine to the Kriegsmarine in 1935. In 1937 he was promoted to Leutnant zur See. On board the German pocket battleship "Admiral Graf Spee" he participated in the Spanish Civil War. He then transferred to the Schnellboot service. The German naval force had sunk 23 vessels by the end of 1940.

=== English Channel ===
On 5 July Töniges commanded "S-19" on a patrol in the Portland and Isle of Wight area. He claimed a 3,000-ton ship sunk 30 nautical miles south of the Isle of Wight. No British loss matches the claim. On 24 July 1940, Töniges, aboard "S-19", sortied with "S-1" and "S-27" into the English Channel. The mission made headlines over the world. They intercepted and sank a French steamer, SS Meknes, and sank the ship, killing 416 men, which was carrying repatriated French soldiers to Vichy France. The survivors were rescued by the British. The British said it was flying French national colours, a charge the Germans denied. The British condemned the attack in the House of Commons as an example of Nazi callousness. On 25 July 1940 Töniges left port aboard "S-19" on another patrol. The group claimed three ships sunk—"S-19" torpedoed SS London Trader (646t). The German crew reported it as a 10,000t steamer and all of the ships were reported to have been much larger and heavier than they were.

On 19 February 1941, Töniges sortied with "S-28" and "S-101". He spotted a freighter in the Thames Estuary, and claimed it sunk. British losses show the vessel to be Algarve (1,335t). All 21 crewman were lost. "S-102" fired on a second ship that could be seen through the fog via the fog-lamps. An explosion was heard and Töniges claimed it sank; no further British loss was recorded. He commanded the Schnellboote "S 24", "S 26" and "S 102". Töniges was awarded the Knight's Cross of the Iron Cross after 88 combat patrols on 25 February 1941. On 18 March 1941 the group engaged convoy FN34. The French steamer SS Daphne II (1,970t) was badly damaged by Töniges. It was placed under tow but broke apart in the Humber days later.

=== Black Sea ===
Töniges was relocated to the Eastern Front and operated in the Black Sea. On 27 June 1942, Töniges sank the passenger ship SS Belostok (2,034t) which was evacuating wounded soldiers from Sevastopol. On 7 August 1942 Töniges sank the Sevastopol (1,339t). On 31 August he claimed a 3,000-ton freighter. On 3 September he claimed a 2,000-ton ship and two 1,200-ton light freighters. The claims are hard to substantiate, but by the 5 September 1942 the German vessels claimed to have sunk 20 Soviet ships evacuating Red Army forces on the Taman Peninsula.

He soon also received the Oak Leaves to the Knight's Cross on 13 November 1942, the first in the Schnellboot service. At this point Töniges had sunk 18 war and merchant ships plus two U-boat hunters. He was transferred to the Naval Academy Mürwik (Marineschule Mürwik) in Flensburg-Mürwik as company commander at the end of September 1942. Here he received the Fast Attack Craft War Badge with Diamonds. As of September 1943 he served as a training officer in the Oberkommando der Kriegsmarine, where he was promoted to Korvettenkapitän on 1 January 1945.

== Awards ==
- Iron Cross (1939)
  - 2nd Class (24 June 1940)
  - 1st Class (6 July 1940)
- Spanish Cross in Bronze with Swords (6 June 1939)
- Sudetenland Medal (20 December 1939)
- Finnish Order of the Cross of Liberty 4th Class (4 November 1941)
- Fast Attack Craft War Badge
  - Fast Attack Craft War Badge (28 January 1941)
  - Fast Attack Craft War Badge with Diamonds (16 December 1942)
- Crimea Shield (16 August 1943)
- Knight's Cross of the Iron Cross with Oak Leaves
  - Knight's Cross on 25 February 1941 as Oberleutnant zur See and commander of Schnellboot S-102 in the 1. Schnellbootflottille (Note: According to Scherzer as commander of Schnellboot S-102.)
  - 143rd Oak Leaves on 13 November 1942 as Kapitänleutnant and commander of Schnellboot S-102 in the 1. Schnellbootflottille

== Notes ==
Military offices
Preceded by none	Commander of 3. Schnellbootflottille; 15 May 1940 – 23 May 1940	Succeeded by Kapitänleutnant Friedrich Kemnade
