= Fast Attack Craft War Badge =

Fast Attack Craft War Badge Schnellbootkriegsabzeichen
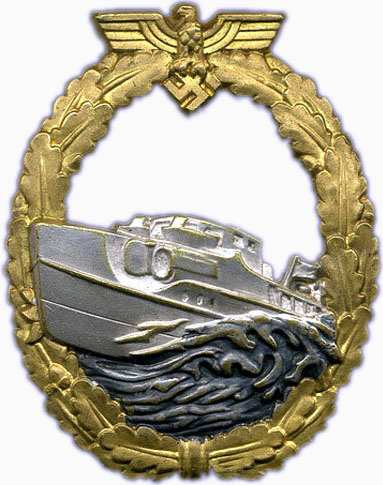
- Type: Badge
- Awarded for: service on fast attack craft or torpedo boats
- Presented by: Nazi Germany
- Eligibility: Military personnel
- Campaign: World War II
- Status: Obsolete
- Established: 30 May 1941

The Fast Attack Craft War Badge or S-Boat War Badge (German: Schnellbootkriegsabzeichen) was a World War II German military decoration awarded to members of the Kriegsmarine for service on fast attack craft or patrol/torpedo boats. The award was instituted on 30 May 1941. Requirements to receive the award included: an outstandingly successful sortie, wounded in action, 12 sorties against enemy vessels or installations, or outstanding leadership.

== Description ==
The medal was produced in two versions. The original 1941 version consisted of a "shorter high-silhouette" S-boat with an outer gold laurel wreath of oak leaves with the German Eagle at the top, while clutching a swastika. The second later version was introduced in January, 1943. It had the same basic design, but with a "longer and newer" model S-boat and a larger German Eagle at the top. The badge was worn on the lower part of the left breast pocket of the naval service tunic, underneath the 1st class Iron Cross, if awarded.

== Recipients of Fast Attack Craft war Badge with Diamonds ==
- Kapitänleutnant Werner Töniges on 16 December 1942
- Kapitänleutnant Siegfried Wuppermann on 14 April 1943
- Korvettenkapitän Friedrich Kemnade on 27 May 1943
- Korvettenkapitän Georg Christiansen on 13 November 1943
- Korvettenkapitän Bernd-Georg Klug on 1 January 1944
- Korvettenkapitän Klaus Feldt on 1 January 1944
- Kapitän zur See Rudolf Petersen on 13 June 1944
- Kapitänleutnant Götz Freiherr von Mirbach on 14 June 1944
