= Felix Zymalkowski =

- Born: 13 August 1913; Berlin-Grünau, German Empire
- Died: 17 August 2004 (aged 91); Bonn, Germany
- Military career
- Allegiance: Nazi Germany
- Branch: Kriegsmarine
- Service years: 1934–1945
- Rank: Korvettenkapitän
- Units: SSS Gorch Fock cruiser Karlsruhe cruiser Admiral Graf Spee battleship Gneisenau
- Conflicts: Spanish Civil War; World War II
- Awards: Knight's Cross of the Iron Cross

Felix Zymalkowski (13 August 1913 – 17 August 2004) was a German naval officer and pharmaceutical chemist.

During World War II, Zymalkowski commanded a Schnellboot. His performance earned him multiple awards for excellence, culminating in the Knight's Cross of the Iron Cross in 1943.

Subsequently, in 1944, Zymalkowski married Barbara Zimmermann. The marriage would produce two daughters, Katharina (born 1946) and Brigitte (born 1948).

Zymalkowski studied under Karl Wilhelm Rosenmund after the war at the University of Kiel in West Germany. He habilitated in 1955 and became a full professor at the University of Bonn in 1963.

Military offices
Preceded by Kapitänleutnant Georg Christiansen	Commander of 8. Schnellbootflottille; 1 December 1942 – 8 May 1945	Succeeded by —
