= Destroyer War Badge =

World War II German military decoration

Destroyer War Badge Zerstörerkriegsabzeichen
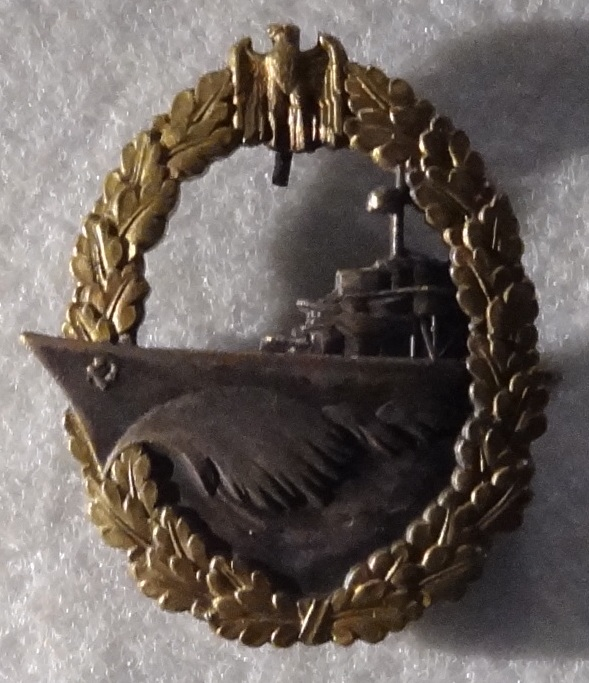
- 1957 version (swastika removed)
- Type: Badge
- Awarded for: service in Kriegsmarine destroyers
- Presented by: Nazi Germany
- Eligibility: Military personnel
- Campaign: World War II
- Status: Obsolete
- Established: 4 June 1940

The Destroyer War Badge (German: Zerstörerkriegsabzeichen) as a World War II German military decoration and awarded to officers and crew for service on Kriegsmarine destroyers. It was instituted on 4 June 1940 by Grand Admiral Erich Raeder following the battle of Narvik. It was also awarded to the crews of torpedo boats and fast attack craft until the institution of the Fast Attack Craft War Badge.

== Design ==
The medal, designed by Paul Carsberg of Berlin, consists of an outer oakleaf laurel wreath of oak leaves with the national emblem of eagle clutching a swastika (both golden coloured) at its apex. The central area features a side-view of a destroyer cutting through a wave (both silver-grey to black in colour). It was worn on the lower part of the left breast pocket of the naval service tunic, underneath the 1st class Iron Cross if awarded. Additionally, an embroidered cloth version was produced.

== Criteria for award ==
Required qualifications prior to 10 October 1940 included participation in the battles of Narvik. After this date:

- Wounded in action
- Served on ship sunk in action (Z1)
- Participation in three enemy engagements or at least in 12 non-enemy sorties
- Outstanding performance or other heroic deeds in a single action
