= Friedrich Kemnade =

- Born: 12 December 1911; Schwarmstedt, district of Fallingbostel, German Empire
- Died: 29 January 2008 (aged 96); Hamburg, Germany
- Military career
- Branch: Kriegsmarine; German Navy
- Service years: 1931–1945, 1956–1970
- Rank: Korvettenkapitän (Kriegsmarine); Konteradmiral (Bundesmarine)
- Conflicts: World War II
- Awards: Knight's Cross of the Iron Cross with Oak Leaves; Great Cross of Merit

Friedrich Walter Karl Kemnade (12 December 1911 – 29 January 2008) was a German naval commander during World War II who later served with the Federal German Navy, reaching the rank of Konteradmiral. He was a recipient of the Knight's Cross of the Iron Cross with Oak Leaves of Nazi Germany.

Friedrich Kemnade was born on 12 December 1911 in Schwarmstedt in the district of Fallingbostel near Hanover, Germany. He joined the military services of the Reichsmarine on 1 April 1931 as a naval officer candidate.

Kemnade joined the newly formed Federal German Navy on 1 April 1956 as a Fregattenkapitän (Commander) and became a Naval Administrator on the staff of the German Military Representative to NATO Military Committee in Washington, D.C. He received the Grand Cross of the Order of Merit of the Federal Republic of Germany for his long service and contributions to the Bundeswehr in September 1970.

== Awards ==
- Iron Cross (1939) 2nd Class (30 April 1940) & 1st Class (24 December 1940)
- Wound Badge in Black (20 September 1940)
- Wehrmacht Long Service Award 4th & 3rd Class
- Fast Attack Craft War Badge (11 March 1941)
- German Cross in Gold on 2 February 1942 as Kapitänleutnant in the 3. Schnellbootflottille
- Silver Medal of Military Valor (three times): 21 May 1942; 24 January 1943; 1943
- High Seas Fleet Badge (2 January 1943)
- Croce di Guerra al Valor Militare (17 March 1943)
- Knight's Cross of the Iron Cross with Oak Leaves
  - Knight's Cross on 23 July 1942 as Kapitänleutnant and chief of the 3. Schnellbootflottille
  - Oak Leaves on 27 May 1943 as Korvettenkapitän and chief of the 3. Schnellbootflottille
- Great Cross of Merit (September 1970)

Military offices
Preceded by Oberleutnant zur See Werner Töniges	Commander of 3. Schnellbootflottille; 23 May 1940 – 9 July 1943	Succeeded by Kapitänleutnant Albert Müller
Preceded by —	Commander of Kommando der Schnellboote; 1958 – 1960	Succeeded by Carl-Heinz Birnbacher
