= List of admirals of Germany =

Admirals of Germany have existed since the founding of German sea forces, first with the Reichsflotte and then most predominantly that of the Prussian Navy. German admirals led the German Navy through World War I, as leaders of the Imperial German Navy, as well as through the inter-war years of the Reichsmarine.

Flag officers of the Kriegsmarine were the leadership of the Germany Navy during World War II under the authority of Nazi Germany. The modern day German Navy exists after the navies of Germany being separated into the West German Navy and the Volksmarine of East Germany.

== Großadmirale ==
Command post flags

1900–1918

1939–1945

Grossadmiral

The rank of Grossadmiral (Grand admiral) was introduced in 1905 as the naval equivalent to the five-star rank of the Generalfeldmarschall (general field marshal) OF-10 in Heer (en: Army). Hans von Koester was the first German flag officer to hold this rank. Wilhelm II. would wear the uniform of a Großadmiral on occasions. Since as Emperor he was Commander-in-Chief of the Navy and thus not subject to promotions.

Name	Born	Died	Date of rank	Crew/Year	Notes
Hans von Koester	29 April 1844	21 February 1928	28 June 1905	21 June 1859	
King Oscar II of Sweden	21 January 1821	8 December 1907	13 July 1905	30 August 1888	honorary rank (a la suite)
Prince Heinrich von Preußen	14 August 1862	20 April 1929	4 September 1909	21 April 1877	
Alfred von Tirpitz	19 March 1849	6 March 1930	27 January 1911	24 April 1865	
Henning von Holtzendorff	9 January 1853	6 June 1919	31 May 1918	11 April 1869	
Erich Raeder	24 April 1876	6 November 1960	1 April 1939	16 April 1894	
Karl Dönitz	16 September 1891	24 December 1980	31 January 1943	4 April 1910	

== Generaladmirale ==

Name	Born	Died	Date of rank	Crew/Year	Notes
Conrad Albrecht	7 October 1880	18 August 1969	1 April 1939	10 April 1899	
Alfred Saalwächter	10 January 1883	6 December 1945	1 January 1940	10 April 1901	executed by the Soviet Union
Rolf Carls	29 May 1885	14 April 1945	19 July 1940	1 April 1903	
Karl Witzell	18 October 1884	31 May 1976	1 April 1941	1 April 1902	
Hermann Boehm	18 January 1884	11 April 1972	1 April 1941	1 April 1903	
Otto Schultze	11 May 1884	22 January 1966	31 August 1942	7 April 1900	zV
Wilhelm Marschall	30 September 1886	20 March 1976	1 February 1943	1 April 1906	
Otto Schniewind	14 December 1887	26 March 1964	1 March 1944	3 April 1907	
Walter Warzecha	28 May 1891	3 August 1956	1 March 1944	1 April 1909	
Oskar Kummetz	21 July 1891	17 December 1980	16 September 1944	1 April 1910	
Hans-Georg von Friedeburg	15 July 1895	23 May 1945	1 May 1945	1 April 1914	suicide

== Admirale ==

The rank of admiral was the highest rank until the rank of Großadmiral was introduced in 1905. Prince Adalbert of Prussia was the first and only admiral of the Prussian Navy and later the Navy of the North German Confederation. The rank was not used in the Imperial German Navy until 1892. In the Reichsmarine Admiral was again the highest of three flag officer ranks. With the creation of the Kriegsmarine and the expansion of the fleet a new rank, Generaladmiral, was introduced in 1936, followed by the rank of Großadmiral in 1939. Thus the rank of admiral became the third-lowest, roughly equivalent of a general in the Heer or Luftwaffe. When the Bundeswehr was formed in 1955 Admiral became the highest rank again. The Volksmarine of the National People's Army of the German Democratic Republic used ranks similar to those in the Soviet Navy. While technically there was a rank of Flottenadmiral (Fleet Admiral), Admiral was the highest rank any naval officer achieved.

Name	Born	Died	Date of rank	Crew/Year	Navy	Notes
Prince Adalbert of Prussia	29 October 1811	6 June 1873	19 April 1859	17 April 1848	Prussian Navy	
Max von der Goltz	19 April 1838	20 December 1906	2 September 1892	28 October 1853	Imperial German Navy	
Eduard von Knorr	8 March 1840	17 February 1920	31 May 1893	24 June 1854	Imperial German Navy	
Friedrich von Hollmann	19 January 1842	21 January 1913	18 April 1896	18 June 1857	Imperial German Navy	
Guido Karcher	8 July 1844	27 December 1905	26 June 1899	21 June 1859	Imperial German Navy	
August von Thomsen	6 August 1846	26 September 1920	19 November 1900	11 January 1862	Imperial German Navy	ennobled 16 June 1913
Otto von Diederichs	7 September 1843	8 March 1918	27 January 1902	6 September 1865	Imperial German Navy	entered Prussian Army 1 January 1862
Gustav von Senden-Bibran	23 July 1847	23 November 1909	14 November 1903	7 April 1862	Imperial German Navy	
Felix von Bendemann	8 August 1848	31 October 1915	14 November 1903	9 June 1864	Imperial German Navy	ennobled 27 January 1905
Volkmar von Arnim	7 November 1847	10 September 1923	22 June 1905	15 June 1863	Imperial German Navy	
Wilhelm Büchsel	12 April 1848	7 April 1920	26 June 1905	24 April 1865	Imperial German Navy	
Curt von Prittwitz und Gaffron	16 July 1849	16 February 1922	18 May 1907	21 April 1866	Imperial German Navy	ennobled 15 June 1908
Max von Fischel	31 March 1850	11 May 1929	17 September 1907	15 April 1867	Imperial German Navy	
Friedrich von Baudissin	3 April 1852	21 February 1921	27 January 1908	15 April 1867	Imperial German Navy	
Georg Alexander von Müller	24 March 1854	18 April 1940	29 August 1910	31 May 1871	Imperial German Navy	
Oskar von Truppel	17 May 1854	20 August 1931	27 January 1911	31 May 1871	Imperial German Navy	
Ludwig von Schröder	17 July 1854	24 July 1933	27 January 1911	31 May 1871	Imperial German Navy	
Carl von Coerper	18 May 1854	20 April 1942	6 May 1912	31 May 1871	Imperial German Navy	
Hugo von Pohl	25 August 1855	23 February 1916	1 April 1913	18 April 1872	Imperial German Navy	
August von Heeringen	26 November 1855	29 September 1927	21 January 1913	18 April 1872	Imperial German Navy	
Eduard von Capelle	10 October 1855	23 February 1931	12 April 1913	18 April 1872	Imperial German Navy	
Friedrich von Ingenohl	30 June 1857	19 December 1933	15 November 1913	12 April 1874	Imperial German Navy	
Karl Dick	24 April 1858	30 December 1928	17 September 1914	21 April 1877	Imperial German Navy	
Gustav Bachmann	13 July 1860	31 August 1945	22 March 1915	21 April 1877	Imperial German Navy	
Günther von Krosigk	13 September 1860	16 June 1938	22 March 1915	21 April 1877	Imperial German Navy	
Guido von Usedom	2 October 1854	24 February 1925	27 January 1916	31 May 1871	Imperial German Navy	
Reinhard Scheer	30 September 1863	26 November 1928	6 June 1916	22 April 1879	Imperial German Navy	
Reinhard Koch	31 October 1861	26 June 1939	27 January 1918	23 April 1878	Imperial German Navy	
Ehrhard Schmidt	18 May 1863	18 July 1946	27 January 1918	22 April 1879	Imperial German Navy	
Wilhelm Souchon	2 June 1864	13 January 1946	11 August 1918	15 April 1881	Imperial German Navy	
Franz von Hipper	13 September 1863	25 May 1932	11 August 1918	15 April 1881	Imperial German Navy	
Paul Behncke	13 August 1866	4 January 1937	20 December 1920	6 April 1883	Reichsmarine	
Hans Zenker	10 August 1870	18 August 1932	1 October 1924	13 April 1889	Reichsmarine	
Richard Foerster	31 March 1879	9 April 1952	1 December 1935	2 April 1899	Kriegsmarine	
Max Bastian	28 August 1883	11 March 1958	1 April 1938	1 April 1902	Kriegsmarine	
Willi von Nordeck	26 January 1888	12 October 1956	1 January 1940	1 April 1903	Kriegsmarine	
Günther Guse	30 August 1886	6 May 1953	1 January 1940	1 April 1905	Kriegsmarine	
Wilhelm Canaris	1 January 1887	9 April 1945	1 January 1940	1 April 1905	Kriegsmarine	executed by Nazi Germany
Karlgeorg Schuster	19 August 1886	16 June 1973	1 January 1940	1 April 1905	Kriegsmarine	
Hermann Densch	15 June 1887	24 August 1963	1 January 1940	1 April 1905	Kriegsmarine	
Günther Lütjens	25 May 1889	27 May 1941	1 September 1940	3 April 1907	Kriegsmarine	
Wilhelm Prentzel	28 July 1878	2 May 1945	30 November 1930	7 April 1896	Kriegsmarine	
Walter Gladisch	2 January 1882	23 March 1954	1 February 1941	18 April 1898	Kriegsmarine	
Hermann von Fischel	13 January 1887	13 May 1950	1 September 1941	1 April 1905	Kriegsmarine	
Otto Groos	17 July 1882	29 May 1970	1 September 1941	7 April 1900	Kriegsmarine	
Otto Feige	21 September 1882	2 January 1951	1 September 1941	10 April 1901	Kriegsmarine	
Raul Mewis	3 June 1886	23 February 1972	1 March 1942	1 April 1906	Kriegsmarine	
Otto von Schrader	18 March 1888	19 July 1945	1 March 1942	1 April 1906	Kriegsmarine	suicide
Eugen Lindau	3 May 1883	10 May 1960	1 March 1942	1 April 1903	Kriegsmarine	zV
Hermann Mootz	12 July 1889	4 January 1962	1 April 1942	3 April 1907	Kriegsmarine	
Conrad Patzig	24 May 1888	1 December 1975	1 April 1942	3 April 1907	Kriegsmarine	
Otto Hormel	13 September 1886	22 April 1971	1 April 1942	3 April 1907	Kriegsmarine	
Hubert Schmundt	19 September 1888	17 October 1984	1 April 1942	1 April 1908	Kriegsmarine	
Werner Fuchs	18 January 1891	30 June 1976	1 April 1942	1 April 1909	Kriegsmarine	
Kurt Fricke	8 November 1889	2 May 1945	1 April 1942	1 April 1910	Kriegsmarine	
Friedrich-Wilhelm Fleischer	14 September 1890	13 February 1952	1 September 1942	1 April 1909	Kriegsmarine	
Johannes Bachmann	22 March 1890	2 April 1945	1 September 1942	1 April 1909	Kriegsmarine	
Ernst von Gagern	6 July 1878	14 September 1954	1 September 1942	16 April 1894	Kriegsmarine	
Gottfried Hansen	8 November 1881	16 July 1976	1 September 1942	12 April 1898	Kriegsmarine	
Paul Fanger	11 April 1889	15 April 1945	1 September 1942	1 April 1908	Kriegsmarine	
Otto Ciliax	30 October 1891	12 December 1964	1 February 1943	10 April 1910	Kriegsmarine	
Werner Tillessen	22 August 1880	19 May 1953	1 February 1943	12 April 1898	Kriegsmarine	zV
Erich Förste	11 February 1892	10 July 1963	1 March 1943	1 April 1910	Kriegsmarine	
Theodor Krancke	20 March 1893	18 June 1973	1 April 1943	1 April 1912	Kriegsmarine	
Otto Backenköhler	1 February 1892	5 February 1967	1 April 1943	1 April 1910	Kriegsmarine	
Wilhelm Meisel	4 November 1893	7 September 1974	1 April 1944	1 April 1913	Kriegsmarine	
Paul Wenneker	27 February 1890	17 October 1979	1 August 1944	1 April 1909	Kriegsmarine	
Hans-Heinrich Wurmbach	12 May 1891	16 December 1965	1 October 1944	1 April 1911	Kriegsmarine	
Theodor Burchardi	14 May 1892	12 August 1983	January 1945	1 April 1911	Kriegsmarine	
Erich Zieger (Ing.)	12 July 1889	21 March 1945	1 September 1942	1 October 1907	Kriegsmarine	
Sigmund Moosauer (San.)	13 March 1877	20 April 1944	1 October 1938	1 April 1903	Kriegsmarine	Admiraloberstabsarzt
Alfred Fikentscher (San.)	30 April 1888	10 January 1979	1 September 1942	1 April 1914	Kriegsmarine	Admiraloberstabsarzt
Armin Zimmermann	23 December 1917	30 November 1976	1 April 1972	1 April 1937	German Navy	Inspector General of the Federal Armed Forces
Günter Luther	17 March 1922	31 May 1997	1 October 1980	1 April 1939	German Navy	Inspector General of the Federal Armed Forces; DSACEUR
Dieter Wellershoff	16 March 1933	16 July 2005	1 October 1986	1 April 1957	German Navy	Inspector General of the Federal Armed Forces
Rainer Feist	12 April 1945	19 May 2007	18 September 2002	1 April 1966	German Navy	DSACEUR
Manfred Nielson	25 February 1955		March 2016	1 July 1973	German Navy	DSACT
Wilhelm Ehm	30 August 1918	9 August 2009	7 October 1977	10 July 1950	Volksmarine	30 November 1987 (ret.)
Theodor Hoffmann	27 February 1935	1 November 2018	18 November 1989	12 May 1952	Volksmarine	24 September 1990 (ret.)
Waldemar Verner	27 August 1914	15 February 1982	1 March 1961	15 June 1950	Volksmarine	31 December 1976 (ret.)

== Vizeadmirale ==

Vizeadmiral was a flag officer rank introduced in the Prussian Navy in 1858 and used subsequently in all other German navies.

Name	Born	Died	Date of rank	Crew/Year	Navy	Notes
Jan Schröder	15 November 1800	2 May 1885	22 May 1858	4 July 1846	Prussian Navy	entered French navy in 1812, transferred to Dutch navy February 1814, character as Schout bij Nacht, 22 November 1882
Eduard von Jachmann	2 March 1822	21 October 1887	22 March 1868	1 January 1848	Imperial German Navy	ennobled 1882
Ludwig von Henk	4 March 1820	17 October 1894	28 June 1877	22 January 1849	Imperial German Navy	
Carl Ferdinand Batsch	10 January 1831	22 November 1898	3 February 1880	8 September 1848	Imperial German Navy	
Otto Livonius	1 April 1829	9 February 1917	27 December 1883	7 December 1848	Imperial German Navy	
Alexander von Monts de Mazin	9 August 1832	19 January 1889	24 September 1884	29 November 1849	Imperial German Navy	
Wilhelm von Wickede	5 December 1830	28 November 1895	19 March 1885	13 September 1868	Imperial German Navy	
Louis von Blanc	12 May 1832	9 January 1903	14 May 1887	14 September 1865	Imperial German Navy	entered Prussian Army 1 January 1850
Carl Heinrich Theodor Paschen	9 June 1835	24 February 1911	27 January 1889	29 August 1866	Imperial German Navy	Entered Austro-Hungarian Navy on 1 October 1849
Philipp von Kall	18 December 1840	12 January 1899	27 July 1889	21 April 1855	Imperial German Navy	
Karl August Deinhard	2 February 1842	4 October 1892	27 January 1890	24 April 1856	Imperial German Navy	
Wilhelm Schröder	19 September 1842	17 June 1908	14 April 1891	21 June 1858	Imperial German Navy	
Victor Valois	14 August 1841	1 January 1924	10 October 1892	18 June 1857	Imperial German Navy	
Ernst von Reiche	29 July 1840	15 December 1912	13 May 1895	17 February 1866	Imperial German Navy	entered Seewehr on 15 December 1863
Iwan Friedrich Julius Oldekop	3 October 1844	7 January 1936	22 March 1899	1 May 1865	Imperial German Navy	
Paul Hoffmann	20 June 1866	18 April 1917	18 September 1899	15 June 1863	Imperial German Navy	
Hans Sack	27 July 1848	15 February 1924	1 November 1901	24 April 1865	Imperial German Navy	
Richard Geissler	20 June 1848	28 September 1922	14 December 1901	1 May 1865	Imperial German Navy	
Otto Diederichsen	21 August 1850	13 November 1925	1 April 1902	21 April 1866	Imperial German Navy	
Ernst Fritze	20 April 1850	27 February 1941	27 January 1904	15 July 1864	Imperial German Navy	
Hunold von Ahlefeld	5 March 1851	5 September 1919	27 January 1905	15 April 1867	Imperial German Navy	
Karl Galster	20 November 1851	24 March 1931	14 March 1905	26 April 1868	Imperial German Navy	
Rudolf von Eickstedt	27 September 1852	30 June 1925	1 April 1906	26 April 1868	Imperial German Navy	
Carl Wodrig	20 July 1851	23 January 1940	7 April 1906	26 April 1868	Imperial German Navy	
Gustav Schmidt	28 October 1851	24 June 1931	1 April 1906	26 April 1868	Imperial German Navy	
Ludwig Borckenhagen	15 July 1850	17 June 1917	27 January 1907	26 April 1868	Imperial German Navy	
Alfred Breusing	15 July 1853	5 October 1914	27 January 1907	11 April 1869	Imperial German Navy	
Hugo Zeye	21 March 1852	11 December 1909	27 April 1907	11 April 1869	Imperial German Navy	
Adolf Goetz	1 June 1852	17 November 1916	17 September 1907	18 March 1876	Imperial German Navy	entered Austro-Hungarian Navy on 1 October 1866
Raimund Winkler	15 December 1855	16 July 1941	18 December 1909	18 April 1872	Imperial German Navy	
Adolf Paschen	1 March 1856	24 December 1925	27 January 1910	18 April 1872	Imperial German Navy	
Max Rollmann	13 February 1857	1 September 1942	27 January 1910	8 April 1873	Imperial German Navy	
Hermann Jacobsen	23 April 1859	14 November 1943	27 January 1911	17 April 1875	Imperial German Navy	
Wilhelm Schack	16 March 1860	5 February 1920	22 March 1911	28 April 1876	Imperial German Navy	
Max von Grapow	18 April 1861	4 March 1924	10 April 1911	21 April 1877	Imperial German Navy	
Hans von Dambrowski	30 March 1861	31 May 1938	6 May 1912	21 April 1877	Imperial German Navy	
Gerhard Gerdes	13 February 1861	1 March 1941	30 April 1913	21 April 1877	Imperial German Navy	
Wilhelm von Lans	5 March 1861	21 March 1947	27 January 1913	23 April 1878	Imperial German Navy	
Maximilian von Spee	22 June 1861	8 December 1914	15 November 1913	23 April 1878	Imperial German Navy	
Harald Dähnhardt	27 October 1863	21 May 1944	31 March 1914	22 April 1879	Imperial German Navy	
Konrad von Henkel-Gebhardi	4 June 1860	16 June 1923	14 July 1914	21 April 1877	Imperial German Navy	ennobled 7 November 1914
Richard Eckermann	15 July 1862	13 January 1916	13 October 1914	15 April 1881	Imperial German Navy	
Konrad Trummler	16 January 1864	27 December 1936	17 June 1915	15 April 1881	Imperial German Navy	
Friedrich Schultz	14 January 1865	24 March 1945	17 June 1915	15 April 1881	Imperial German Navy	
Hubert von Rebeur-Paschwitz	14 August 1863	1 February 1933	18 September 1915	20 April 1882	Imperial German Navy	
Friedrich Gädeke	15 May 1866	26 May 1935	17 October 1915	20 April 1882	Imperial German Navy	
Leo Jacobsen	21 October 1862	19 February 1954	27 January 1916	15 April 1880	Imperial German Navy	
Robert Mischke	10 March 1865	27 March 1932	27 January 1916	20 April 1882	Imperial German Navy	
Johannes Merten	17 December 1857	8 April 1926	16 January 1916	17 April 1875	Imperial German Navy	
Carl Schaumann	9 October 1865	23 June 1938	22 March 1916	20 April 1882	Imperial German Navy	
Friedrich Schrader	9 February 1865	24 April 1937	24 April 1916	16 April 1883	Imperial German Navy	
Alfred Ehrlich	23 September 1854	20 January 1926	13 May 1916	31 May 1871	Imperial German Navy	
Otto Wurmbach	8 June 1864	25 April 1940	25 November 1916	16 April 1883	Imperial German Navy	
Gisberth Jasper	28 August 1865	9 February 1953	25 November 1916	16 April 1883	Imperial German Navy	
Franz Mauve	11 November 1864	12 December 1931	25 November 1916	16 April 1883	Imperial German Navy	
Hugo Kraft	10 February 1866	15 November 1925	25 November 1916	16 April 1883	Imperial German Navy	
Herwarth Schmidt von Schwind	2 September 1866	24 June 1941	14 October 1917	16 April 1883	Imperial German Navy	
Albert Hopman	30 April 1865	14 March 1942	14 October 1917	21 April 1884	Imperial German Navy	
Ernst Ritter von Mann und Edler von Tiechler	11 April 1864	2 October 1934	27 January 1918	21 April 1884	Imperial German Navy	
Friedrich Boedicker	13 March 1866	20 September 1944	27 January 1918	21 April 1884	Imperial German Navy	
Maximilian Rogge	14 March 1866	6 September 1940	18 September 1918	21 April 1884	Imperial German Navy	
Hermann Nordmann	19 January 1868	11 February 1933	18 September 1918	21 April 1884	Imperial German Navy	
Richard Engel	27 July 1866	22 November 1954	29 October 1918	21 April 1884	Imperial German Navy	
Adolf von Trotha	1 March 1868	11 October 1940	31 October 1919	16 April 1886	Imperial German Navy	
Andreas Michelsen	19 February 1869	8 April 1932	21 January 1920	13 April 188	Imperial German Navy	
Ludwig von Reuter	9 February 1869	18 December 1943	29 October 1919	11 April 1885	Imperial German Navy	
Alfred Meyer-Waldeck	27 November 1864	25 August 1928	27 January 1918	21 April 1884	Imperial German Navy	
Gottfried von Dalwigk zu Lichtenfels	4 July 1868	23 May 1936	30 September 1920	21 April 1884	Imperial German Navy	
Walter Engelhardt	22 August 1867	22 September 1943	1 October 1919	21 April 1884	Imperial German Navy	
Ludolf von Uslar	3 January 1867	28 July 1939	1 October 1919	11 April 1885	Imperial German Navy	
Heinrich Löhlein	1 February 1871	2 March 1960	1 November 1920	13 April 188	Imperial German Navy	
Hugo Dominik	25 October 1871	13 September 1933	1 October 1921	1 April 1890	Reichsmarine	
Theodor Püllen	25 November 1871	5 June 1931	1 August 1922	10 April 1891	Reichsmarine	
Konrad Mommsen	10 May 1871	4 November 1946	1 November 1923	10 April 1897	Reichsmarine	
Hermann Bauer	22 July 1875	11 February 1958	1 February 1925	9 April 1892	Reichsmarine	
Iwan Christian Hermann Oldekop	8 February 1878	13 May 1942	1 January 1928	2 April 1895	Reichsmarine	
Walther Franz	7 August 1880	19 January 1956	1 December 1928	7 April 1897	Reichsmarine	
Friedrich Brutzer	25 September 1879	12 June 1958	1 April 1930	2 April 1898	Reichsmarine	
Albrecht Freiherr von Freyberg-Eisenberg-Allmendingen	4 February 1876	13 September 1943	1 August 1933	13 April 1896	Reichsmarine	
Emil Heusinger von Waldegg	22 October 1880	8 December 1966	1 October 1933	7 April 1900	Reichsmarine	
Friedrich Goetting	7 February 1886	3 January 1946	1 October 1937	1 April 1903	Kriegsmarine	died in Soviet captivity
Hans-Herbert Stobwasser	8 March 1885	10 February 1946	1 October 1937	6 April 1904	Kriegsmarine	suicide
Robert Witthoeft-Emden	29 August 1886	4 December 1960	1 November 1937	6 April 1904	Kriegsmarine	
Witold Rother	24 May 1888	27 October 1962	1 November 1939	1 April 1905	Kriegsmarine	
Werner Grassmann	9 March 1888	20 October 1943	1 January 1940	3 April 1907	Kriegsmarine	
Siegfried Maßmann	2 April 1882	15 February 1945	1 September 1940	10 April 1901	Kriegsmarine	zV, KIA
Heinrich Ancker	7 October 1886	15 May 1960	1 November 1940	1 April 1906	Kriegsmarine	
Kurt Aßmann	13 July 1883	26 July 1962	1 January 1941	10 April 1901	Kriegsmarine	
Ernst Wolf	21 July 1886	29 July 1964	1 January 1941	1 April 1906	Kriegsmarine	
Thilo von Seebach	30 June 1890	21 October 1966	1 January 1941	1 April 1909	Kriegsmarine	
Lothar von Arnauld de la Perière	18 March 1886	21 February 1941	1 February 1941	1 April 1903	Kriegsmarine	
Alexander Werth	2 May 1879	20 April 1942	1 February 1941	7 April 1897	Kriegsmarine	zV
Paul Wülfing von Ditten	13 September 1880	1 November 1953	1 February 1941	2 April 1898	Kriegsmarine	zV
Eduard Eichel	21 December 1880	3 May 1956	1 August 1941	10 April 1899	Kriegsmarine	
Hans Hubert von Stosch	3 November 1889	28 April 1945	1 September 1941	1 April 1908	Kriegsmarine	suicide
Wolf von Trotha	10 October 1884	31 January 1946	1 September 1941	1 April 1902	Kriegsmarine	
Walther Kinzel	17 August 1880	3 October 1964	1 September 1941	10 April 1899	Kriegsmarine	zV
Günther Krause	25 January 1890	12 October 1983	1 February 1942	1 April 1909	Kriegsmarine	
Ralf von der Marwitz	29 October 1888	26 September 1966	1 February 1942	1 April 1906	Kriegsmarine	
Heinrich Hanke	16 December 1890	23 April 1945	1 February 1942	4 June 1910	Kriegsmarine	KIA
Franz Wieting	27 October 1876	20 February 1966	1 February 1942	2 April 1895	Kriegsmarine	zV
Friedrich Wilhelm Kurze	5 July 1891	23 December 1945	1 March 1942	1 April 1910	Kriegsmarine	
Otto Schenk	17 February 1891	19 December 1972	1 March 1942	1 April 1910	Kriegsmarine	
Walter Georg Lohmann	11 December 1891	13 April 1955	1 March 1942	1 April 1910	Kriegsmarine	
Leopold Siemens	17 May 1889	7 December 1979	1 April 1942	1 April 1910	Kriegsmarine	
Eberhard Weichold	23 August 1891	19 December 1960	1 April 1942	1 April 1911	Kriegsmarine	
Adalbert Schüßler	28 October 1887	1 October 1970	1 April 1942	1 April 1905	Kriegsmarine	
Heino von Heimburg	24 October 1889	October 1945	1 April 1942	3 April 1907	Kriegsmarine	
Georg Reimer	21 July 1888	25 June 1974	1 April 1942	1 April 1906	Kriegsmarine	
Herbert Straehler	6 January 1887	16 May 1979	1 April 1942	1 April 1906	Kriegsmarine	
Theodor Arps	11 February 1884	28 April 1947	1 April 1942	1 April 1902	Kriegsmarine	
Hans Stohwasser	4 May 1884	30 May 1967	1 April 1942	10 April 1901	Kriegsmarine	
Eberhard Wolfram	24 July 1882	6 January 1947	1 April 1942	7 April 1900	Kriegsmarine	
Ernst Junkermann	25 June 1881	5 March 1944	1 April 1942	10 April 1899	Kriegsmarine	
Erhard Maertens	26 February 1891	5 May 1945	1 September 1942	1 April 1910	Kriegsmarine	
Kurt von dem Borne	24 November 1885	31 January 1946	1 September 1942	6 April 1904	Kriegsmarine	
Kurt Slevogt	21 March 1892	23 July 1957	1 September 1942	1 April 1910	Kriegsmarine	
Adolf Pfeiffer	29 October 1876	14 May 1961	1 September 1942	2 April 1895	Kriegsmarine	
Walter Krastel	29 January 1892	15 September 1966	1 February 1943	1 April 1911	Kriegsmarine	
Robin Schall-Emden	22 March 1893	29 January 1946	1 February 1943	1 April 1911	Kriegsmarine	
Fritz Lamprecht	9 August 1893	23 July 1961	1 February 1943	1 April 1911	Kriegsmarine	
Alexander Michels	17 March 1891	29 June 1968	1 February 1943	1 April 1911	Kriegsmarine	
Friedrich Ruge	24 December 1894	3 July 1985	1 February 1943	1 April 1914	Kriegsmarine	entered Bundesmarine as Vizeadmiral on 1 March 1956
Friedrich Lützow	31 August 1881	1 November 1964	1 February 1943	10 April 1899	Kriegsmarine	
Gustav Kieseritzky	22 September 1893	19 November 1943	1 March 1943	1 April 1912	Kriegsmarine	KIA
Heinz Nordmann	28 May 1893	23 December 1945	1 April 1943	1 April 1911	Kriegsmarine	
Werner Lange	18 July 1893	19 November 1965	1 April 1943	1 April 1912	Kriegsmarine	
August Thiele	26 August 1893	31 March 1981	1 April 1943	1 April 1912	Kriegsmarine	
Ernst Schirlitz	7 September 1893	27 November 1978	1 April 1943	1 April 1912	Kriegsmarine	
Kurt Caesar Hoffmann	26 August 1895	19 May 1988	1 April 1943	1 April 1912	Kriegsmarine	
Joachim Lietzmann	1 September 1894	19 September 1959	1 October 1943	1 April 1911	Kriegsmarine	
Paul Wever	28 January 1893	11 August 1944	1 October 1943	1 April 1912	Kriegsmarine	
Leopold Bürkner	29 January 1894	15 July 1975	1 October 1943	1 April 1912	Kriegsmarine	
Gustav Kleikamp	8 March 1896	13 September 1952	1 October 1943	1 April 1913	Kriegsmarine	
Friedrich Rieve	27 June 1896	16 February 1981	1 October 1943	1 April 1914	Kriegsmarine	
Kurt Utke	2 December 1893	30 September 1970	1 February 1944	13 April 1912	Kriegsmarine	missing, body found 6 August 1971
Helmuth Brinkmann	12 March 1895	24 September 1983	1 February 1944	1 April 1913	Kriegsmarine	
Wilhelm Meendsen-Bohlken	25 June 1897	20 August 1985	1 March 1943	4 January 1915 (I./14)	Kriegsmarine	
Werner Löwisch	22 February 1894	6 June 1971	1 July 1944	1 April 1912	Kriegsmarine	
Ernst Scheurlen	5 December 1894	8 April 1945	1 August 1944	1 April 1912	Kriegsmarine	KIA
Hellmuth Heye	9 August 1895	10 November 1970	1 August 1944	1 April 1914	Kriegsmarine	
Hans-Erich Voß	30 October 1897	18 November 1969	1 August 1944	4 July 1915 (VII./15)	Kriegsmarine	
Walter Matthiae	3 August 1880	27 June 1960	1 November 1944	7 April 1900	Kriegsmarine	
Friedrich Frisius	17 January 1895	30 August 1970	30 September 1944	1 April 1913	Kriegsmarine	
Bruno Machens	25 July 1895	20 November 1976	1 December 1944	1 April 1914	Kriegsmarine	
Leo Kreisch	25 June 1895	22 July 1977	1 January 1945	1 April 1914	Kriegsmarine	
Karl Topp	29 September 1895	24 April 1981	1 January 1945	1 April 1914	Kriegsmarine	
Friedrich Hueffmeyer	14 June 1898	13 January 1972	1 January 1945	16 September 1914	Kriegsmarine	war volunteer
Bernhard Rogge	4 November 1899	29 June 1982	1 March 1945	1 July 1915 (VII./15)	Kriegsmarine	entered Bundesmarine as Konteradmiral on 1 March 1956
Rudolf Stange	13 November 1899	25 April 1992	1 April 1945	4 April 1916 (IV./16)	Kriegsmarine	
Erich Schulte Mönting	28 August 1897	17 January 1976	1 April 1945	2 January 1916 (I./16)	Kriegsmarine	
Martin Baltzer	10 November 1898	3 April 1971	1 April 1945	4 July 1916 (VII./16)	Kriegsmarine	
Hans Fechter (Ing.)	26 May 1885	4 July 1955	1 November 1937	1 October 1905	Kriegsmarine	
Karl Thäter (Ing.)	13 September 1886	14 October 1962	1 February 1942	1 October 1908	Kriegsmarine	
Alfred Schirmer (Ing.)	8 September 1892	31 October 1975	1 April 1942	1 April 1909	Kriegsmarine	
Ernst Stieringer (Ing.)	23 June 1891	25 July 1975	1 April 1942	1 October 1910	Kriegsmarine	
Heinrich Stiegel (Ing.)	7 February 1891	10 April 1964	1 April 1942	1 October 1910	Kriegsmarine	
Werner Bettenhäuser (Ing.)	3 May 1886	11 September 1959	1 February 1943	1 April 1906	Kriegsmarine	zV
Walter Fröhlich (Ing.)	5 August 1893	12 December 1969	1 April 1943	1 October 1912	Kriegsmarine	
Karl Packroß (Ing.)	17 January 1891	6 January 1946	1 June 1944	1 October 1909	Kriegsmarine	
Karl Kaufmann (Ing.)	24 August 1893	4 August 1975	1 April 1945	1 October 1911	Kriegsmarine	
Gustav Lüttge (Ing.)	26 December 1890	25 December 1963	1 April 1945	1 October 1911	Kriegsmarine	
Paul Schmidt (San.)	29 April 1856	21 October 1921	21 June 1907	11 May 1878	Imperial German Navy	
Walther Uthemann (San.)	28 September 1863	11 March 1944	10 November 1919	15 March 1887	Reichsmarine	Marinegeneraloberstabsarzt
Emil Greul (San.)	29 December 1895	30 October 1993	1 October 1943	17 February 1922	Kriegsmarine	Admiralstabsarzt, volunteered for the Bavarian Army on 1 May 1915
Wolfgang Benzino	14 January 1921	1 September 2004	1 April 1979	1 December 1939	German Navy	
Ansgar Bethge	16 November 1924	13 January 2008	1 April 1980	1942	German Navy	
Hans Rudolf Boehmer	18 May 1938		1993	1959	German Navy	
Dieter-Franz Braun	19 December 1935	22 March 2014	1 May 1990	1956 (V./56)	German Navy	
Lutz Feldt	25 April 1945		2000	1965	German Navy	
Hans Frank	22 June 1939		1994	1 April 1961 (IV./61)	German Navy	
Günter Fromm	21 November 1924	10 July 2013	1 April 1977	1942	German Navy	
Jürgen-Friedrich Geier	5 May 1940			1 April 1959 (IV./59)	German Navy	
Heinrich Gerlach	31 August 1906	27 June 1988	1964	1925	German Navy	
Paul Hartwig	14 September 1915	9 March 2014	1 April 1972	1 April 1935	German Navy	
Bernd Heise	26 January 1943		1 October 2000	1962	German Navy	
Karl Hetz	11 May 1910	23 December 1980	1 October 1966	1 April 1929	German Navy	
Dirk Horten	14 December 1939		1 April 1995	1 April 1958 (IV./58)	German Navy	
Gert Jeschonnek	30 October 1912	18 April 1999	11 June 1967		German Navy	
Helmut Kampe	7 December 1925				German Navy	
Hans-Helmut Klose	9 September 1916	19 October 2003	10 October 1975	1 April 1936	German Navy	
Andreas Krause	11 October 1956		2012	1 July 1976 (VII./76)	German Navy	
Wolfram Kühn	7 November 1952		27 April 2006	1972	German Navy	
Heinz Kühnle	16 January 1915	12 October 2001			German Navy	
Heinrich Lange	22 February 1955		15 March 2013		German Navy	
Hans Lüssow	10 February 1942		1 October 1998	1 April 1962 (IV./62)	German Navy	
Hans-Joachim Mann	26 June 1935		1 October 1986	1956 (V./56)	German Navy	
Wilhelm Meentzen	19 March 1915	8 May 2001	1971	1 April 1934	German Navy	
Wolfgang E. Nolting	6 April 1948		2003	1966	German Navy	
Albrecht Obermaier	9 July 1912	1 August 2004	1 October 1968	1 April 1933	German Navy	
Klaus Rehder	7 August 1933		1 October 1986	1 September 1956 (IX./56)	German Navy	
Frank Ropers	August 1946		January 2001	1966	German Navy	
Joachim Rühle	1 May 1959		May 2012	1 July 1978 (VII./78)	German Navy	
Axel Schimpf	1 October 1952		May 2010	1971	German Navy	
Horst von Schoeter	10 June 1919	25 July 2006	1 October 1976	1 April 1937	German Navy	
Rolf Steinhaus	1 April 1916	1 October 2004	1 February 1974	1 April 1936	German Navy	
Hans-Joachim Stricker	29 June 1949		2005	1 October 1968 (X./68)	German Navy	
Herbert Trebesch	9 November 1915	6 July 2007	10 October 1975	1 April 1935	German Navy	
Gerhard Wagner	23 November 1898	26 June 1987	28 March 1962	4 July 1916	German Navy	
Edward Wegener	17 December 1904	30 December 1981	2 January 1963		German Navy	
Ulrich Weisser	20 September 1938	20 April 2013		1958	German Navy	
Hein-Peter Weyher	22 March 1935		1 October 1991	2 January 1956	German Navy	
Hans-Jochen Witthauer	13 March 1950		2009	1 October 1968 (X./68)	German Navy	
Karl-Adolf Zenker	19 July 1907	27 March 1998	29 January 1962	1 April 1926	German Navy	
Heinz Neukirchen	15 January 1915	8 December 1986	1 March 1964	1 March 1951	Volksmarine	
Hendrik Born	5 July 1944		11 December 1989	29 August 1963	Volksmarine	
Gustav Hesse	27 August 1931	24 October 2001	7 October 1979		Volksmarine	
Hans Hofmann	10 July 1933		1 March 1986	15 October 1950	Volksmarine	
Günter Kutzschebauch	27 October 1930	16 February 1996	1 March 1981		Volksmarine	
Wilhelm Nordin	24 April 1924	7 May 1993	7 October 1978	1950	Volksmarine	
Bruno Wansierski	4 August 1904	30 July 1994	1 March 1971	1940	Volksmarine	
Rainer Brinkmann	4 March 1958		October 2014	1976	German Navy	

== Vizeadmirale (Charakter) ==
An honorary rank in the German Empire.

Name	Born	Died	Date of rank	Crew/Year	Navy	Notes
Franz von Waldersee	17 September 1835	22 November 1903	27 January 1900	30 July 1861	Imperial German Navy	entered Prussian Army on 29 April 1854
Carl von Eisendecher	23 June 1841	19 August 1934	27 January 1900	18 June 1857	Imperial German Navy	skipper of Meteor
Albert von Seckendorff	11 March 1849	28 June 1921	27 January 1900	21 October 1864	Imperial German Navy	
Oskar von Platen-Hallermund	18 March 1865	14 April 1957	22 March 1916	20 April 1882	Imperial German Navy	Chamberlain to Wilhelm II. (1911–1935)
Karl Bartenbach	29 November 1881	24 October 1949	19 August 1939	12 April 1898	Kriegsmarine	

== Konteradmirale ==

Konteradmiral (Rear Admiral) has been a flag officer rank in the naval forces of Germany since 1849.

Name	Born	Died	Date of rank	Crew/Year	Navy	Notes
Karl Rudolf Brommy	10 September 1804	9 January 1860	23 November 1849	10 September 1848	Reichsflotte	
Hans Kuhn	29 November 1824	?	22 March 1868	16 June 1849		
Eduard Heldt			1868	1849		
Gustav Klatt			1873	1849		
Reinhold von Werner	10 May 1825	26 February 1909	1875	1852	Imperial German Navy	
Franz Kinderling			1878	1852		
Adolph Berger			1878	1848		
Archibald MacLean			1880	1849		
Georg von Schleinitz			1883	1849		
Paul von Reibnitz			1883	1851; 1855		
Heinrich Kühne			1883	1854		
Johann-Heinrich Pirner			1885	1854		
Karl Eduard Heusner			1889	1857		
Georg Scheder			27 January 1904	1858	Imperial German Navy	
Rudolf Schering			1889	1858		
George von Hollen			1889	1859		
Franz Mensing			1889	1859; 1866		
Max Schulze			1890	1861		
Friedrich von Pawelsz			1890	1860		
Richard Aschenborn	19 January 1848	16 February 1935	10 October 1892	7 April 1862	Imperial German Navy	
Carl Barandon			27 January 1894	1866/68		
Max Plüddemann			1895	1864		
Conrad von Bodenhausen			1898	1 May 1865		
Friedrich von Weitersheim			1898	1 May 1865		
Hugo von Schuckmann			1898	1 May 1865		
Curt von Maltzahn			1900	21 April 1866		
Ernst von Frantzius			1900	15 April 1867		
Hermann Kirchhoff			1900	15 April 1867		
August Carl Thiele			1902	26 April 1868		
Erich von Dresky			1902	26 April 1868		
Friedrich Vüllers			1904	1870; 1871		
Georg Schreder			1904	1870		
Ernst Gülich			1904	1870		
Heinrich von Moltke			1904	1870		
Wilhelm Kindt			1905	31 May 1871		
Rudolf Siegel			1905	11 April 1869		
Max von Basse			28 May 1906	31 May 1871		
Carl Franz			1906	18 April 1872		
Eugen Kalau vom Hofe			1907	8 April 1873		
Malte von Schimmelmann			1908	17 April 1875		
Erich Gühler			1908	1876		
Johannes Schröder			1908	17 April 1875		
Max Prowe			1908	17 April 1875		
Hugo Kinderling			1908	1877		
Heinrich Saß			1909	23 April 1878		
Heinrich Stromeyer			1910	1879		
Franz von Holleben			1910	15 April 1880		
Johannes Rieve			1911	15 April 1880		
Karl Zimmermann			1911	15 April 1881		
Christian Schütz			1911	15 April 1881		
Wilhelm Sthamer			1911	15 April 1881		
Karl Behm			18 November 1912	1882		
Felix Funke			1912	1882		
Hermann Alberts	8 March 1865	12 December 1946	15 November 1913	16 April 1883	Imperial German Navy	
Leberecht Maaß			1913	16 April 1883		
Arthur Tapken			1914	16 April 1883		
Alfred Begas			23 February 1915	16 April 1883		
Georg Scheidt			1915	16 April 1883		
Georg von Ammon	17 May 1869	2 February 1937	18 September 1915	21 April 1884		
Curt von Rössing			1916	11 April 1885		
Karl Wilbrandt			1916	1882		
Hugo Louran			1916	1882		
Max Witschel			1916	16 April 1883		
Hugo Westphal			1916	1870		
Eduard Holzhauer			1916	18 April 1872		
Otto Back			22 March 1916	16 April 1883		
Otto Philipp			1916	16 April 1883		
Robert Kühne			1916	11 April 1885		
Hugo Langemak			1916	11 April 1885		
Alexander Meurer			1916	15 April 1881		
Wilhelm Starke			1916	16 April 1883		
Carl Hollweg			1916	11 April 1885		
Karl Seiferling			1916	11 April 1885		
Carl Wedding			1916	11 April 1885		
Hans Uthemann			1916	1886		
Walter von Keyserlink			1917	1886		
Richard Lange			1917	1886		
Georg Ahlert	24 December 1867	17 June 1963	17 September 1917	11 April 1885		
Karl Heuser			1917	1886		
Hugo Meurer			1917	1886		
Max Hahn			1917	1886		
Constanz Feldt			1917	1886		
Karl Sievers			1918	1886		
Johannes Hartog			1918	1887		
Ernst Goette			1918	1887		
Wilhelm Höpfner			1918	1887		
Eduard Varrentrapp			1918	1887		
Johannes Redlich			1918	1887		
Eberhard von Mantey			1918	1887		
Waldemar Pieper			1918	1887		
Karl Hering			1918	1887		
Johannes von Karpf			1918	1887		
Hans Küsel			1918	1887		
Friedrich von Bülow			1918	1888		
Bernhard Rösing			1918	1888		
Paul Heinrich			1919	1889		
William Michaelis			1919	1889		
Wilhelm Tägert			1920	1889		
Magnus von Levetzow			1920	1889		
Ernst Ewers			1920	1890		
Friedrich Richter			1920	1890		
Hans Eberius			1920	1890		
Karl von Hornhardt			1920	1890		
Max Reymann			1921	1891		
Max Looff			1921	1891		
Lothar von Gohren			1921	1892		
Walter Hildebrand			1921	1892		
Wilhelm von Haxthausen			1922	1893		
Wolfgang Wegener			1923	1894		
Hugo von Rosenberg			1923	1893		
Ludwig Kahlhausen			1923	1894		
Wilhelm Kahlert			1924	1895		
Martin Hosemann			1925	1895		
Oskar Heinecke			1926	1897		
Wilfried von Loewenfeld			1928	1897		
Hans Kolbe			1931	1900		
Konrad Zander			1932	1901		
Ludwig von Schröder			1934	1903		
Erwin Waßner			1936	1906		
Kurt Ramien			1938	1908		
Oskar Wehr			1939	1904		
Theodor-Heinrich Riedel			1939	1909		
Werner Steffan			1939	1907		
Hans Feldbausch			1940	1910		
Erich Mahrholz			1940	1898		
Wilhelm Rümann			1940	1899		
Ernst Schumacher			1940	1900		
Reimar von Bonin			1941	1908		
Friedrich Braune			1941	1907		
Hellmut Kienast			1941	1909		
Arno Schmidt			1941	1909		
Robert Eyssen			1941	1911		
Peter Christian Donner			1941	1899		
Hans-Hermann von Schweinitz			1941	1901		
Hasso von Bredow			1941	1901		
Hans Walther			1941	1902		
Ernst Krafft			1941	1903		
Oswald Paul			1941	1901		
Hermann Lorey			1941	1896		
Ernst Hintzmann			1941	1897		
Erich Heyden			1941	1898		
Heinrich Kehrhahn			1941	1900		
Fritz Conrad			1941	1901		
Erhard Tobye			1941	1911		
Paul Hönicke			1941	1901		
Arno Spindler			1941	1898		
Edmund Schulz			1941	1894		
Werner Scheer			1941	1912		
Carl August Claussen			1941	1900		
Karl Wollanke			1941	1903		
Franz Claassen			1942	1899		
Erich Haeker			1942	1906		
Ulrich Rasmus			1942	1907		
Wilhelm Kopp			1942	1899		
Werner Lindenau			1942	1912		
Heinz Menche			1942	1903		
Eberhard von Goetze			1942	1912		
Otto Klüber			1942	1913		
Otto Fein			1942	1913		
Walter Koehler			1942	1901		
Herbert Goehle			1942	1897		
Reinhold Gadow			1942	1900		
Waldemar Bender			1942	1905		
Karl von Bodecker			1942	1894		
Joachim Plath			1942	1913		
Günther Horstmann			1942	1913		
Heinrich Ruhfus			1942	1913		
Otto Fricke			1942	1913		
Hans Henning			1942	1914		
Max Kühne			1942	1890		
Wilhelm Rhein			1942	1907		
Walter Oehler			1942	1908		
Walther Dose			1942	1905		
Harald Kienast			1942	1913		
Siegfried Punt			1942	1898		
Hans-Udo von Tresckow			1942	1912		
Hermann von Bredow			1942	1912		
Clamor von Trotha			1942	1912		
Bernhard Liebetanz			1942	1913		
Rudolf Junker			1942	1913		
Rudolf Schulte			1942	1903		
Heinrich Wagner			1942	1906; 1907		
Werner Fürbringer			1942	1907		
Werner Stichling			1943	1914		
Hans Bütow			1943	1914		
Siegfried Claassen			1943	1902		
Joachim von Gerlach			1943	1913		
Wilhelm Matthies			1943	1914		
Otto Kähler			1943	1914		
Hans Mirow			1943	1914		
Ernst Kratzenberg			1943	1914		
Kurt Böhmer			1943	1914		
Erich Bey			1943	3 January 1916 (I./16)		
Gerhard Wagner	23 November 1898	26 June 1987	1 March 1943; 1 March 1956	1 July 1916 (VII./16)	Kriegsmarine; German Navy	temporary rank of Vizeadmiral from 28 March - 31 December 1962
Günther Schubert			1943	1 July 1916 (VII.16)		
Eberhard Godt			1943	1 July 1918 (VII./18)		
Adalbert Zuckschwerdt			1943	1893		
Siegfried Engel			1943	1911		
Karl-Otto Gutjahr			1943	1914		
Werner Schönermark			1943	January 1915 (I./15)		
Ernst Lucht			1943	August 1915 (VIII./15)		
Erich Müller			1943	1914		
Waldemar Winther			1943	April 1915 (IV./15)		
Karl Hoffmann			1943	October 1915 (X./15)		
Siegfried Sorge			1943	July 1916 (VII./16)		
Ludwig Stummel			1943	July 1916 (VII./16)		
Hans Hartmann			1943	October 1915 (X./15)		
Erich Breuning			1943	January 1916 (I./16)		
Hans Leithäuser			1943	1914		
Georg Kleine			1943	1900		
Ernst von Studnitz			1943	July 1915 (VII./15)		
Karl-Jesko von Puttkamer			1943	July 1917 (VII./15)		
Reinhold Henrici			1944	1907		
Hans-Joachim Gadow			1944	October 1916 (X./16)		
Friedrich Traugott Schmidt			1944	October 1915 (X./15)		
Walter Hennecke			1944	October 1915 (X./15)		
Otto Schulz			1944	April 1916 (IV./16)		
Günther von der Forst			1944	January 1916 (I./16)		
Richard Rothe-Roth			1944	October 1916 (X./16)		
Hans Meyer			1944	January 1917 (I./17)		
Paul Meixner			1944	1910/40		
Rudolf Peters			1944	October 1917 (X./17)		
Werner Ehrhardt	25 May 1898	23 September 1967	1 August 1944	4 July 1916 (VII./16)	Kriegsmarine	Flottillenadmiral 1957-60 father of Dieter Ehrhardt
Wilhelm Busse			1944	1896		
Fritz Krauß			1944	April 1917 (IV./17)		
Conrad Engelhardt			1944	April 1916 (IV./16)		
Wilhelm Mössel			1944	July 1916 (VII./16)		
Ludolf von Hohnhorst			1944	October 1916 (X./16)		
Hans Michahelles			1944	April 1917 (IV./17)		
Wolff-Ehrenreich von Arnswaldt	23 March 1898	4 January 1972	1 January 1945	5 July 1915 (VII./15)	Kriegsmarine	
Kurt Weyher	22 March 1935		1944	1918		
Rolf Johannesson	22 July 1900	6 December 1989	1 January 1945; 22 December 1958	July 1918 (VII./18)	Kriegsmarine; German Navy	
Georg Waue			1944	July 1918 (VII./18)		
Ernst Friedrich (Ing.)			1923	1893		
Paul Berndt (Ing.)			1928	1897		
Hans Peters (Ing.)			1933	1903		
Walter Kühn (Ing.)			1940	1910		
Wilhelm Betche (Ing.)			1941	1899		
Helmut Grube (Ing.)			1942	1912		
Ernst Halwe (Ing.)			1942	1907		
Johannes Strauch (Ing.)			1942	1905		
Paul-Willy Zieb (Ing.)			1942	1912		
Wilhelm Tackenberg (Ing.)			1942	1912		
Friedrich Hilbig (Ing.)			1942	1893		
Fritz Niemand (Ing.)			1942	1911		
Alfred Schulze (Ing.)			1942	1912		
Walter Steiner (Ing.)			1942	1911		
Wilhelm Genske (Ing.)			1942	1906		
Wilhelm Johannsen (Ing.)			1943	1911		
Max Adam (Ing.)	28 December 1894	22 October 1978	1 February 1943	10 October 1913	Kriegsmarine	
Arthur Gerlach (Ing.)			1943	1910		
Otto Thedsen (Ing.)			1943	1905		
Max Schenitzki (Ing.)			1943	1913		
Carl Weber (Ing.)			1943	VIII./1914		
Hans Voß (Ing.)			1944	VIII./1914		
Waldemar Kober (Ing.)			1944	1914		
Heinz Scheffer (Ing.)			1944	April 1916 (IV./16)		
Max Peters (Ing.)			1944	1907		
Johannes Steenbock (Ing.)			1944	1913		
Julius Heimberg (Ing.)			1944	April 1917 (IV./17)		
Carl Wenzel (San.)			1892	1854; 1857		
Hermann Gutschow (San.)			1899	1866; 1871		
Heinrich Helferich (San.)			1906	1873; 1906		
Otto Elste (San.)			1908	1875; 1879		
August Bier (San.)			1911	1883; 1886		
Johannes Brachmann (San.)			1922	1888; 1891		
Karl Eyerich (San.)			1937	1904; 1911		
Johannes Sontag (San.)			1938	1906; 1913		
Egon Schulte-Ostrop (San.)			1939	1907; 1914		
Werner d'Hargues (San.)			1941	1911; 1914		
Wilhelm Brahms (San.)			1941	1899; 1904		
Kurt Dütschke (San.)			1941	1911; 1914		
Willy Mücke (San.)			1941	1907; 1913		
Walter Lange (San.)			1941	1901; 1907		
Eberhard Ahrens (San.)	13 January 1892	29 June 1945	1 September 1941	21 May 1921	Kriegsmarine	served as reservist with the navy in WWI
Hans-Releff Riege (San.)			1941	1914		
Karl Kraft (San.)			1942	1914; 1922		
Gerhard Müller (San.)			1943	1914; 1922		
Walther Goette (San.)			1943	1913; 1922		
Fritz Nadler (San.)			1943	1922		
Hugo Caanitz (San.)			1944	1914; 1922		
Otto Siegfried Tarnow (San.)			1944	1914; 1922		
Heinrich Nöldeke (San.)			1944	1922		
Alois Evers (San.)			1944	1915; 1922		
Hans-Hinrich Möller (San.)			1944	1915; 1922		
Hellmut Heim (San.)			1944	1918; 1923		
Friedrich Matthes (W)			1943	1898		
Richard Jewinski (W)			1943	1905		
Hans Hamelau (W)			1943	1901		
August Böning (V)			1945	1910		
Rudolf Arendt	25 January 1923		1980	1940	German Navy	
Jörg Auer	21 November 1943				German Navy	
Carl Heinz Birnbacher	26 May 1910	5 December 1991	1 October 1968	1 October 1930	German Navy	
Wolfgang Brost	20 January 1936				German Navy	
Thomas Daum	17 July 1962		1 November 2015	VII/81	German Navy	
Rudolf Deckert	3 November 1927	2008			German Navy	
Christoph Diehl	20 November 1946				German Navy	
Jürgen Dubois	7 December 1932				German Navy	
Dieter Ehrhardt	14 May 1927				German Navy	son of Werner Ehrhardt
Heinrich Erdmann	15 July 1908	19 March 1992		April 1927	German Navy	
Hans-Arend Feindt	29 October 1921	2 February 2002	1979	XII/39	German Navy	
Horst Geffers	15 February 1925	16 December 2015			German Navy	
Gerhard Güllich	1 March 1938		1991	1958	German Navy	
Friedrich Guggenberger	6 March 1915	13 May 1988	31 October 1968	Crew 34	German Navy	
Heinz-Harald Hallier	19 April 1936				German Navy	
Erich Happach					German Navy	
Hubert Haß	30 January 1949		2009	1968	German Navy	
Sigurd Heß	26 February 1938			IX/57	German Navy	
Klaus-Peter Hirtz	30 October 1945		2001	1966	German Navy	
Gottfried Hoch					German Navy	
Joachim-Albrecht von Holleuffer	20 March 1921				German Navy	
Diether Hülsemann	23 October 1937				German Navy	
Otto Ites	5 February 1918	2 February 1982	1 April 1975	3 April 1936	German Navy	
Klaus Jancke					German Navy	
Berthold Jung	17 June 1915	11 January 1992	1970	1935	German Navy	
Uwe Siegfried Kahre					German Navy	
Friedrich Kemnade	12 December 1911	29 January 2008	2 April 1968	1 April 1931	German Navy	
Horst-Dieter Kolletschke	29 February 1952		2010		German Navy	
Hansjakob Kratzmair	19 September 1927				German Navy	
Willi Krauß	27 December 1935	2013			German Navy	
Günter Kuhnke	7 September 1912	11 October 1990	1 April 1966	7 April 1931	German Navy	
Rudolf Lange	17 September 1941			IV/61	German Navy	
Dieter Leder					German Navy	
Gustav Carl Eduard Liebig	5 June 1930	28 February 2007	1983	1956	German Navy	
Hans-Friedrich Meisner	30 August 1928				German Navy	
Hans-Jochen Meyer-Höper	10 February 1935				German Navy	
Michael Mollenhauer	27 November 1951		1 September 2009	1971	German Navy	
Helmut Neuss	12 March 1908	21 July 2009		1926	German Navy	
Eberhard Noodt	16 September 1922	27 October 2005	1977	XII/39	German Navy	
Ulrich Otto					German Navy	
Karl Peter	17 September 1918	6 December 2003	1 September 1973	1938	German Navy	
Günter Poser	23 September 1916	3 June 2003	27 February 1970	3 April 1936	German Navy	
Erwin Rau	3 January 1918				German Navy	
Günther Reeder	2 November 1915				German Navy	
Hans-Rudolf Rösing	28 September 1905	16 December 2004	13 November 1962	31 March 1924	German Navy	
Karl Schneider-Pungs	31 July 1914	22 September 2001	1966	1 April 1934	German Navy	
Reinhold Siebert					German Navy	
Karl Ernst Smidt	30 August 1903	11 January 1984	31 October 1961	1922	German Navy	
Horst Sommermeyer	12 March 1938				German Navy	
Klaus-Jürgen Steindorff	17 May 1932	14 January 2006	1986	I/56	German Navy	
Klaus-Jürgen Thäter	27 June 1925	27 October 2000	1979	1 June 1942	German Navy	
Erich Topp	2 July 1914	26 December 2005	21 December 1966	1934	German Navy	
Hanshermann Vohs	4 December 1923	2 July 1996			German Navy	
Edward Wegener	17 December 1904	30 December 1981	1963	1923	German Navy	
Herbert Bernig	6 October 1931		7 October 1988	4 August 1950	Volksmarine	
Hans-Joachim Dönitz	26 June 1934	31 December 2010	7 October 1980	12 May 1952	Volksmarine	no relation to Karl Dönitz
Friedrich Elchlepp	4 July 1924	2 March 2002	30 November 1984	V./41	Volksmarine	
Richard Fischer	24 March 1906	15 December 1991	1 October 1952	15 May 1945	Volksmarine	later Generalmajor
Eberhard Grießbach	3 October 1935		1 March 1986	11 August 1954	Volksmarine	
Lothar Heinecke	30 March 1933	21 February 1985	1 March 1974	3 September 1950	Volksmarine	
Werner Henninger	7 April 1929		7 October 1979	18 November 1950	Volksmarine	
Hans Heß	25 May 1929		7 October 1982	18 November 1950	Volksmarine	
Heinz Irmscher	6 July 1920	September 2004	1 March 1971	1950	Volksmarine	
Heinrich Jordt	15 December 1917	27 July 1987	1 March 1974	1 August 1945	Volksmarine	
Klaus Kahnt	9 February 1935		7 October 1979	10 January 1953	Volksmarine	
Werner Kotte	3 September 1931		7 October 1982	4 August 1950	Volksmarine	
Walter Kühn	4 July 1920		1 March 1976	1 July 1945	Volksmarine	
Wolfgang Laue	24 February 1929	1996	7 October 1982	1 August 1952	Volksmarine	
Peter Miethe	27 January 1944		7 October 1989	1962	Volksmarine	
Helmut Milzow	10 July 1932		7 October 1984	18 November 1950	Volksmarine	
Gerhard Müller	18 May 1941		21 February 1989	1 August 1960	Volksmarine	
Joachim Münch	21 February 1928		7 October 1982	3 August 1954	Volksmarine	
Egon Nitz	9 May 1934	19 May 2011	1 March 1987	20 January 1953	Volksmarine	
Hans Partzsch	28 February 1930	8 June 2012	1 March 1988	21 September 1949	Volksmarine	
Günther Pöschel	14 June 1933		7 October 1984	10 July 1951	Volksmarine	
Rolf Rödel	5 April 1940	17 October 2013	7 October 1983	1 September 1958	Volksmarine	
Felix Scheffler	9 February 1915	13 March 1986	1 October 1952	1950	Volksmarine	
Herbert Städke	17 March 1931	11 January 2008	1 March 1984	1 November 1953	Volksmarine	
Johannes Streubel	17 January 1921	22 February 1990	1 May 1964	10 February 1950	Volksmarine	
Rudi Wegner	27 May 1923	20 July 1995	7 October 1968	1950	Volksmarine	
Karl Weiß	6 April 1935		7 October 1984	1 April 1952	Volksmarine	
Wolfgang Bremer	1 June 1953			VII./73	German Navy	
Jens-Voker Kronisch	1949		1 April 2008		German Navy	
Klaus von Dambrowski	16 February 1953		1 October 2012	1972	German Navy	active
Thomas Jugel			1 May 2013		German Navy	active
Hans-Christian Luther	21 January 1955		24 May 2014	1974; 1977	German Navy	active
Klaus-Michael Nelte			1 May 2013	1977	German Navy	active

== Konteradmirale (Charakter) ==
Name	Date of birth	Date of death	Date of rank	Crew/Year	Notes
Johann Otto Donner	27 October 1808	16 February 1873	11 April 1862	1822; 1850	served in the Royal Danish Navy prior to 1849
Hinrik Sundewall	29 December 1814	27 October 1884	4 August 1863	1834; 5 June 1852	served in the Royal Swedish Navy prior to 1852
Wilhelm von Hessen-Philippsthal-Barchfeld	3 October 1831	17 January 1890	22 March 1864	1848; 29 January 1854	served in the Royal Danish Navy and Royal Navy prior to 1854
Heinrich Köhler	3 July 1824	21 June 1882	22 March 1873	1848; 1849	served in the Prussian Army
Hermann Robert Przewisinski	6 March 1831	9 October 1902	17 December 1878	24 October 1848	
Paul Zirzow	6 June 1838	14 January 1912	13 November 1883	24 June 1854	
Graf Arthur von Schack-Wittenau-Danckelmann	26 July 1839	1 February 1892	15 January 1885	24 April 1856	
Graf Friedrich von Hacke	3 March 1841	29 April 1897	17 February 1885	24 June 1854	18 March 1886
Bartholomäus von Werner	18 July 1842	6 April 1924	15 November 1887	24 April 1856	
Gustav Stempel	16 February 1838	6 March 1915	15 November 1888	17 December 1863	28 August 1865 retroactive commission
Conrad Dietert	5 October 1844	15 September 1906	18 February 1890	16 June 1860	
Franz von Kyckbusch	14 February 1844	29 November 1896	2 December 1890	16 June 1860	
Franz Strauch	11 April 1846	11 August 1928	21 September 1891	9 June 1864	
Ernst Aschmann	15 June 1848	29 October 1910	17 October 1892	15 June 1863	
Rudolf Rittmeyer	27 September 1850	28 February 1914	13 April 1896	21 April 1866	
Oscar Boeters	19 November 1848	5 February 1912	14 September 1896	1 May 1865	
Walther Koch	4 October 1848	17 October 1917	29 March 1897	24 April 1865	
Fritz Rötger	6 July 1848	26 July 1913	12 April 1898	24 April 1865	
Richard Hornung	5 November 1850	4 April 1905	10 October 1898	15 April 1867	
Oscar von Schuckmann	25 May 1851	7 March 1920	7 March 1899	9 June 1864	
Oscar Klausa	6 January 1849	2 November 1907	7 May 1900	24 April 1865	
Felix Stubenrauch	7 March 1850	15 September 1931	7 May 1900	15 April 1867	
Emil Freiherr von Lyncker	15 December 1849	5 June 1931	7 May 1900	15 April 1867	
Louis Riedel	12 December 1849	10 March 1907	17 September 1900	15 April 1867	
Max Heßner	21 April 1850	3 February 1925	28 May 1901	15 April 1867	
August Gruner			1901	1868	
Kurt Kalau vom Hofe			1901	1867	
Paul Hofmeier			1901	1867	
Karl Rosendahl			1902	1869	
Hermann da Fonseca-Wollheim			1902	1868	
Oskar Stiege			1902	1869	
Leopold Koellner			1903	1869	
Adolf Thiele			1903	1870	
Alfred Herz			1903	1866	
Ernst Credner			1903	1868	
Hugo Plachte			1904	1870	
Gottlieb Becker			27 January 1904	1869	
Hans Meyer			1904	1871	
Johannes Stein			1904	1873	
Walther Faber			1904	1870/73	
Otto Flichtenhöfer			1905	1868	
Max Galster			1905	1868	
Georg Sarnow			1905	1868	
Carl Friedrich	1855	1918	1906	1872	
Karl Ascher			11 October 1906	1868	
Reinhold Brussatis			1906	1872	
Max Bachem			10 November 1906	1872	
Georg Janke			1907	1874	
Johannes Wallmann			1907	1874	
Ludwig Bruch			1907	1877	
Carl Derzewski			1907	1873	
Hugo Emsmann			1907	1874	
Hermann Lilie			1907	1873	
Rudolf Engel			1907	1874	
Ernst van Semmern			1907	1876	
Fritz Sommerwerck			1907	1874	
Adolph von Bassewitz			27 January 1908	1876	
Georg Scheibel			1908	1876	
Eugen Weber	1860	1929	1908	1878	
Carl Schönfelder			1908	1876	
Wilhelm Becker			12 October 1908	1877	
Hartwig von Dassel			1908	1877	
Paul Rampold			1909	1877	
Victor Schönfelder			1909	1874	
Hugo von Cotzhausen			1909	1879	
Johannes Recke			1909	1879	
Otto Herbig			1909	1859	
Otto Hoepner			1909	1873	
Carl Paschen			1909	1874	
Joachim von Bredow			1909	1875	
Johannes Nickel			1909	1878	
Ferdinand von Grumme			1910	1878	
Max Foß			1910	1867	
Max Wilken			1910	1880	
Johannes Meier			1910	1879	
Paul Schlieper			1910	1880	
Friedrich Musculus			1910	1880	
Friedrich Marwede			1910	1880	
Ludwig Glatzel			1911	1881	
Paul von Hintze			1911	1882	
Fritz Hoffmann	1861	1918	1911	1879	
Albertus Petruschky			1913	1884	
Adolf Josephi			1913	1876	
Horst von Hippel			1913	1884	
Wilhelm Bertram			1913	1884	
Ehler Behring			1914	1883	
Max Piraly			1914	1866	
William Kutter			1916	1878	
Georg Wuthmann			1916	1881	
Otto Mandt			1916	1874	
Ferdinand Thyen			1916	1883	
Ferdinand Bertram			1916	1885	
Ulrich Lübbert			1917	1887	
Siegfried von Jachmann			1918	1884	
Hermann Schröder			1918	1887	
Theodor Fuchs			1918	1887	
Willi Brüninghaus			1919	1888	
Heinrich Rohardt			1919	1889	
Karl von Restorff			1919	1888	
Gustav Kirchhoff	1863	1945	1919	1882	
Friedrich Kloebe			1919	1885	
Heinrich Trendtel			1919	1884	
Reinhard von Fischer-Loszainen			1919	1888	
Theodor Frey			1919	1888	
Carl Tägert			1919	1888	
Titus Türk			1919	1888	
Friedrich Pohl			1919	1885	
Max Lans			1919	1888	
Hans Pfundheller			1919	1888	
Rudolf Bartels			30 August 1919	1889	
Richard Koch	1863	1927	1919	1881	
Harry von Posodowsky-Wehner			1919	1887	
Wilhelm Adelung			7 November 1919	1889	
Richard Ackermann			7 November 1919	1889	
Otto Bechtel			18 November 1919	1885	
Max Köthner			1919	1888	
Moritz von Obernitz			1919	1887	
Max Schlicht			1919	1889	
Heinrich Retzmann			1919	1890	
Kurt Graßhoff			1919	1888	
Otto Kranzbühler	1871	1932	1919	1888	
Friedrich von Kühlwetter			1919	1883	
Emil Orth			1919	1888	
Andreas Fischer			1919	1889	
Wilhelm Goetze			1919	1890	
Albert Stoelzel			1919	1890	
Victor Harder	21 November 1870	19 September 1933	26 January 1920	13 April 1889	22 November 1919
Hans Herr	1871	1936	1920	1889	
Hans Seebohm			1920	1890	
Lebrecht von Klitzing			1920	1890	
Hermann Mörsberger			1920	1889	
Victor Reclam			1920	1889	
Waldemar Vollerthun			1920	1888	
Ludwig Saxer			1920	1889	
Friedrich Behnke			1920	1888	
Ernst-Oldwig von Natzmer			1920	1888	
Hans Bene			1920	1890	
Wilhelm von Krosigk	20 November 1871	12 August 1953	1920	1889	
Werner Siemens	1873	1964	1920	1890	
Hans Gygas			1920	1890	
Wilibald Grauer			1920	1889	
Eberhard Heydel			1920	1891	
Carl von Kameke			1920	1888	
Fritz Lüdecke			1920	1890	
Paul Kettner			1920	1890	
Walter Isendahl			1920	1891	
Richard Dittmer			1920	1863	
Erich von Zeppelin			1920	1891	
Gustav Haß	11 March 1872	1 March 1932	15 July 1920	1891	
Paul Boethke			1920	1891	
Paul Wolfram			1920	1891	
Karl Kühlenthal			1920	1891	
Berthold Stechow			1920	1882	
Otto Lans			1920	1889	
Hans Quaet-Faslem			1921	1893	
Johannes Horn			1922	1892	
Fritz Sachsse			1922	1894	
Harry Mündel			1923	1895	
Fritz Wossidlo			1923	1894	
Heinrich Lampe			1923	1896	
Wilhelm Wilke			1923	1896	
Theodor Eschenburg			1924	1895	
Karl Klüpfel			1926	1897	
Bernhard Bobsien			1926	1897	
Ernst Batsch			1 October 1926	1896	
Friedrich Hermann			1927	1898	
Ernst Bindseil			1928	1899	
Albert Gayer			1929	1899	
Rudolf Lahs			1929	1899	
Arthur Rochlitz			1929	1899	
Fritz Spieß			1929	1900	
Willy Hermann			1929	1900	
Franz Schröter			1930	1899	
Ernst Meusel			1930	1899	
Heinrich von Henning			1931	1902	
Iwan Brandes			1932	1901	
Albrecht Meißner			1932	1901	
Leo Riedel			1932	1902	
Heinrich Schickhardt			1933	1902	
Wilhelm-Friedrich Starke			1933	1903	
Heinrich Gebhardt			1933	1904	
Waldemar Hirth			1934	1903	
Reinhold Knobloch			1936	1902	
Karl Coupette			1938	1905	
Carl-Wilhelm Weniger	1874	1945	1939	1891	
Karl-August Nerger			1939	1893	
Otto Klimpt (Ing.)			1919	1878	
Adolf Schützler (Ing.)			1919	1879	
Franz Lemke (Ing.)			1922	1880	
Otto Steinkopf (Ing.)			1924	1893	
Walter Heinze (Ing.)			1928	1897	
Walter Berendt (Ing.)			1929	1898	
Wilhelm Korreng (Ing.)			1930	1899	
Rudolf Braune (San.)			1903	1869; 1870	
Reinhold Ruge (San.)			1914	1881; 1885	
Georg Erdmann (San.)	1860	1943	1914	1880; 1887	
Johannes Runkwitz (San.)			1916	1878; 1882	
Harry Koenig (San.)			1916	1878, 1884	
Oscar Gudden (San.)			1916	1884; 1889	
Eduard Dirksen (San.)			1918	1880; 1884	
Hans Behmer (San.)			1919	1885/89	
Richard Spiering (San.)			1919	1881; 1887	
Hermann Küttner (San.)			1920	1891; 1894	
Maximilian Schumann (San.)			1920	1880; 1886	
Paul Bonte (San.)			1920	1882; 1886	
Günther von Foerster (San.)			1920	1884; 1889	
Robert Martin (San.)			1921	1885; 1889	
Rudolf Scholtz (San.)			1921	1887; 1891	
Claudius Richelot (San.)			1921	1889	
Josef Freymadl (San.)			1922	1883; 1888	
Ernst Böse (San.)			1923	1890; 1895	
Victor Praefcke (San.)			1925	1894; 1900	
Friedrich Schepers (San.)			1926	1899; 1900	
Friedrich Titschak (San.)			1927	1898; 1902	
Friedrich Pinggéra (San.)			1928	1899; 1904	
Edgar Pillet (San.)			1930	1903; 1908	
Emil Krauß (San.)			1934	1903; 1910	

== Flottillenadmirale ==

The rank of Flottillenadmiral (Rear Admiral, lower half) was newly established in 1955 as the naval equivalent to Brigadegeneral. The rank roughly corresponds to the position of Kommodore in earlier German naval forces.

Name	born	died	retired
Hans Bartel	21 May 1901	27 August 1979	30 September 1961
Gustav Bartholomäus	6 April 1924	30 January 2009	30 September 1984
Henning Bess	21 May 1947		31 May 2009
Horst Biesterfeld	1 December 1906	11 October 1969	30 April 1966
Gerhard Bing	4 August 1934	19 March 2006	31 March 1993
Adalbert von Blanc	11 July 1907	7 November 1976	30 September 1964
Rolf Boehe	26 March 1913	26 April 1979	31 March 1972
Willi Boller	3 July 1922		30 September 1982
Karl Wilhelm Bollow	30 August 1952		31 October 2012
Hansdieter Christmann	27 August 1933		30 September 1990
Otto Ciliax	26 June 1939	14 June 2016	30 September 1998
Karl Clausen	9 October 1916	2013	30 September 1976
Herwig Collmann	1 September 1915		31 March 1973
Otto Dingeldein	6 March 1915	11 May 1981	30 September 1972
Oswald Duch	6 July 1918	25 January 2000	31 March 1978
Heinz-Eugen Eberbach	27 December 1946	27 December 2003	(died)
Götz Eberle	28 November 1941		31 December 2001
Jürgen Ehle	17 August 1957		active
Konrad Martin Ehrensberger	27 March 1936		30 June 1994
Rainer Endres	30 May 1957		active
Wolfgang Engelmann	29 May 1937		30 September 1997
Thomas Ernst	1956		active
Waldemar Feldes	20 April 1939		30 September 1999
Heinz Konrad Fenn	20 July 1918		30 September 1978
Günter Fiebig	6 March 1920	7 June 1984	31 March 1980
Hans-Klaus Fingerle	1 April 1908	6 June 1988	30 September 1968
Kurt Fischer	17 January 1937		31 March 1993
Walter Flachsenberg	26 October 1908	3 November 1994	31 March 1969
Kurt Freiwald	29 October 1906	12 December 1975	30 September 1965
Klaus-Dieter Fritz	22 June 1947		31 December 2006
Karl-Heinz Fuchs	18 January 1915		31 March 1973
Johann Christian Giermann	7 November 1936		31 December 1995
Karl-Heinz Göpffarth	8 June 1913	2 February 1977	31 December 1971
Henrich Grote	9 November 1920	25 October 1995	31 March 1981
Siegfried Günther	7 February 1933		31 March 1991
Robert Gysae	4 January 1911	26 April 1989	31 March 1970
Wolfgang Haack	16 January 1910	1991	30 September 1969
Manfred Hartmann	21 January 1950		1 February 2012
Walter Heck	16 May 1910	28 February 1987	31 March 1970
Ronald Hemeling	18 August 1953		31 December 2015
Sigurd Hess	26 February 1938		31 March 1998
Detlev Hoepner	20 July 1943		31 October 2004
Hans-Jürgen von Hößlin	27 January 1937		31 March 1997
Carl Hoffmann	24 July 1923	2001	30 September 1983
Henning Hoops	16 December 1946		31 December 2008
Diether Hülsemann	23 October 1937		31 March 1998
Ulrich Hundt	23 June 1937		30 September 1994
Jan Christian Kaack	24 December 1962		active
Thorsten Kähler	1 February 1955		active
Wolfgang Kähler	22 March 1903	8 September 1983	30 June 1962
Wolfgang Kalähne	7 January 1945		30 June 2007
Detlef Bruno Kammholz	17 December 1939		31 March 2000
Karl Heinz Kelle	5 June 1941		30 September 2001
Thomas Kempf	7 November 1942		30 September 2002
Werner-Georg Kimmerling	23 March 1913	5 September 1995	31 March 1971
Helmut Klemm	16 February 1908	25 October 1969	30 September 1967
Bernd-Georg Klug	12 December 1914	15 June 1975	31 March 1968
Jürgen Egon Kratzmann	23 May 1946		1 June 2008
Markus Krause-Traudes	27 December 1957		active
Martin Krebs	26 July 1955		active
Otto Kretschmer	1 May 1912	5 August 1998	30 September 1970
Paul Kriebel	29 January 1917		31 March 1977
Klaus-Dieter Laudien	7 January 1938		30 September 1995
Frank Martin Lenski			active
Volker Liche	22 July 1941		30 September 2001
Hans Looschen	28 November 1907	27 June 1987	30 September 1966
Werner Lüders	29 May 1953		25 September 2014
Hermann Lüdke	18 December 1911	8 October 1968	30 September 1968
Georg Freiherr von Maltzan	4 May 1953		31 May 2016
Jürgen Mannhardt	17 March 1954		active
Jean Martens	23 May 1961		active
Dieter Martin	16 September 1921		30 September 1981
Jochen Mehner	18 April 1934		31 March 1992
Egon Meyer	7 June 1929		30 September 1988
Hans Meyer	1 December 1898	23 January 1989	31 December 1960
Helmut Meyer-Abich	20 July 1919		30 September 1979
Jürgen zur Mühlen	3 September 1960		active
Ernst-Günther Müller	3 December 1922		31 March 1983
Theodor von Mutius	19 December 1909	19 October 1977	31 March 1970
Klaus-Peter Niemann	29 October 1935		30 September 1994
Horst Oehlke	2 January 1924		31 December 1981
Karl-Wilhelm Ohlms	21 May 1954		active
Reinhart Ostertag	28 October 1913		30 September 1971
Kurt Pfennig	10 January 1942	30 August 1996	died
Hubert Ponert	22 September 1923		30 September 1983
Hubertus von Puttkamer	3 November 1948		30 November 2010
Walter Reichenmiller	27 December 1941	16 March 1999	died
Karlheinz Reichert	1 January 1937		30 September 1995
Friedrich Remde	17 July 1928		30 September 1988
Jörg-Eckart Reschke	20 January 1938		30 September 1996
Karl-Heinz Riemke	24 October 1950		31 March 2010
Hans-Achim Romer	27 February 1939		31 March 1999
Karl-Heinz Rosberg	28 December 1942		30 September 2002
Elmar Schmähling	17 February 1927		16 January 1990
Rolf Schmitz	2 June 1949		30 June 2011
Karsten Schneider	11 January 1956		active
Wolfgang Schrade	2 March 1924	May 2010	31 March 1984
Gerd Schreiber	2 April 1912		31 March 1984
Werner Schünemann	9 March 1920	2004	31 March 1980
Alfred Schumann	16 June 1902	10 May 1985	31 March 1963
Heinrich Schuur	23 November 1937		31 December 1994
Klaus Schwabe	25 February 1938		31 March 1996
Kurt Seizinger	7 January 1920		31 March 1980
Klaus-Dieter Sievert	17 May 1935		30 September 1995
Uwe Sörensen	25 February 1920		31 March 1979
Carsten Stawitzki	29 March 1966		active
Alfons Teipel	30 September 1931		30 September 1989
Ernst Thienemann	7 November 1898	27 June 1964	30 September 1960
Rolf Thomsen	6 May 1915	26 March 2003	31 March 1972
Wilfried Toepser	12 February 1919		31 March 1979
Viktor Toyka	23 October 1946		31 October 2006
Karl-Heinz Vorsteher	1 June 1916	11 June 1988	30 September 1974
Hubert Freiherr von Wangenheim	4 November 1904	3 September 1973	31 December 1962
Horst Wenig	15 December 1919	6 February 1986	31 March 1980
Horst-Helmut Wind	15 August 1927	19 February 2009	30 September 1985
Max-Eckart Wolff	19 December 1902	9 November 1988	31 March 1963
Kurt Ziebis	7 March 1935		31 March 1992
