= Ramien =

Ramien is a German toponymic surname of Slavic origin, referring to a settlement near Szczecin. People with this surname include:

- Th. Ramien, pseudonym used by Magnus Hirschfeld (1868–1935), German physician and sexologist
- Kurt Ramien (fl. 1908–1938), German rear admiral
- Jesse Ramien (born 1997), Australian rugby league player
