= Günter Kutzschebauch =

German politician (1930–1996)

Vizeadmiral Günter Kutzschebauch
- Kutzschebauch c. 1986

Chairman of the Gesellschaft für Sport und Technik
- In office 24 November 1982 – 28 January 1990
- Preceded by: Kurt Krämer (acting)
- Succeeded by: Dieter Sommer
Volkskammer
Member of the Volkskammer for Halle/Saale, Halle-Neustadt
In office 16 June 1986 – 5 April 1990
Preceded by	Margot Honecker
Succeeded by	Constituency abolished

Personal details
- Born: Günter Kutzschebauch; 27 October 1930 Zug, Free State of Saxony, Weimar Republic (now Germany)
- Died: 16 February 1996 (aged 65) Neuenhagen bei Berlin, Brandenburg, Germany
- Party: Socialist Unity Party (1947–1989)
- Education: Flottenschule "Walter Steffens"
- Alma mater: Kuznetsov Naval Academy; Friedrich Engels Military Academy (Dipl. rer. mil.); CPSU Higher Party School "W. I. Lenin"
- Occupation: Politician; Party Functionary; Military Officer; Farmworker
- Awards: Patriotic Order of Merit, 2nd class; Scharnhorst Order

Günter Kutzschebauch (27 October 1930 – 16 February 1996) was a high-ranking East German military officer and a party functionary of the Socialist Unity Party (SED).

Kutzschebauch rose through the ranks of the Volksmarine, reaching the rank of Vizeadmiral (equivalent to Vice admiral) in 1981.

In the 1980s, he transitioned to lead the Gesellschaft für Sport und Technik (GST), a paramilitary mass organization. He was forced into retirement after the Peaceful Revolution and committed suicide after German reunification.

== Life and career ==
=== Early career ===
Kutzschebauch was born as the son of a painter and shoemaker. After World War II, he began an apprenticeship as an agricultural assistant. In 1946, he joined the Free German Youth (FDJ) and in 1947, he became a member of the ruling Socialist Unity Party of Germany (SED).

After completing his training, Kutzschebauch served as Secretary for Labor and Social Policy of the FDJ in the district of Marienberg from 1948 to 1950.

=== Volksmarine ===
On 3 August 1950, he joined the newly formed "armed organs" of the GDR. He initially worked for the Main Administration of the Sea Police and then for the Volkspolizei See, the precursors to the Volksmarine. Between 1950 and 1951, Kutzschebauch trained as a naval officer at the Sea Police School in Parow, later the Non-Commissioned Officer School "Walter Steffens". From 1952 to 1953, he attended the Officer School for Political Work of the Kasernierte Volkspolizei (KVP) in Berlin-Treptow.

After completing his studies, he served as an instructor for the Youth Department in the Political Administration of the KVP and, after its transition to the GDR's official military force in 1955, the National People's Army (NVA) until 1960. In 1959, he was promoted to Korvettenkapitän (equivalent to Corvette Captain) in this role.

Between 1961 and 1963, Kutzschebauch attended the Soviet Naval Academy in Leningrad. Subsequently, he became deputy chief of the Torpedo Boat Brigade of the Sixth Flotilla of the Volksmarine. Later in 1963, he was appointed deputy chief of the 4th Flotilla of the Volksmarine and head of its Political Department.

In 1967, Kutzschebauch became deputy head of the Political Administration and head of the Organization/Instruction Department at the Volksmarine Command. Shortly thereafter, in 1967 and 1968, he completed a distance learning program at the Friedrich Engels Military Academy in Dresden, earning a degree in military science (Dipl. rer. mil.).

In 1973 and 1974, he attended the CPSU Higher Party School "W. I. Lenin" in Moscow. Upon his return, he succeeded Konteradmiral (equivalent to Rear Admiral) Rudi Wegner as deputy chief of the Volksmarine and head of its Political Administration.

During this time, he became one of the highest-ranking officers in the Volksmarine, holding the position of third-highest officer for a period. On 7 October 1974, he was promoted to Konteradmiral and in 1981, he was elevated to Vizeadmiral (equivalent to Vice admiral), one of only 10 officers in the NVA to ever attain this rank.

Kutzschebauch was additionally awarded the Patriotic Order of Merit in silver in 1984, the Kampforden „Für Verdienste um Volk und Vaterland“ and the Scharnhorst Order.

=== GST ===
In 1982, Kutzschebauch transitioned to lead the Gesellschaft für Sport und Technik (GST), succeeding the late Generalleutnant Günther Teller, a SED-controlled paramilitary mass organization. He was made Chairman of the GST's Central Board on 24 November 1982.

Kutzschebauch additionally became a member of the Volkskammer in June 1986, nominally representing Halle/Saale and Halle-Neustadt. He served on the Committee for National Defense.

=== Death ===
During the Peaceful Revolution, the 7th meeting of the Central Board of the GST decided on measures for "democratic renewal and the drafting of a new statute". Kutzschebauch and the entire secretariat resigned on 27 January 1990. Kutzschebauch was discharged from the NVA and retired on 30 April 1990.

Struggling to cope with the dissolution of the GDR and the collapse of his life's work, Kutzschebauch died in 1996 of injuries sustained during a suicide attempt.
