= 2nd Marine Division (Wehrmacht) =

German naval infantry division during World War II (1945)

- German: 2. Marine-Infanterie-Division
- Active: March–May 1945
- Country: Nazi Germany
- Branch: Kriegsmarine
- Type: Marine
- Role: Amphibious warfare
- Size: Division of approx. 13,000 personnel
- Home Station: Glückstadt
- Engagements: Defence of the Homeland

The 2nd Marine Division (German: 2. Marine-Infanterie-Division) was a military formation of the German Navy (Kriegsmarine) under control of the German Army (Heer) during the later part of the Second World War.

== History ==
In March 1945, the 2nd Marine Division was formed in Schleswig-Holstein with its home station in Glückstadt from excess naval personnel. The division also had a significant number of personnel from the Hitler Youth, a battalion of the Waffen-SS, and Hungarian units.

At the beginning of April 1945, the division was declared ready for action and, although poorly trained and equipped, relocated to the zone south of Bremen on the Weser River. From 5 April the division was part of Luftwaffe General Kurt Student's Army Group and moved in to defend the Weser-Aller line. On 10 April the division moved under the Blumentritt Army Group, and fought defensive battles on the Aller between Verden an der Aller and Rethem and from the Essel-Schwarmstedt bridgehead. From 15 April further actions occurred at Kirchboitzen, Kirchlinteln, Visselhövede, Neunkirchen am Potzberg, and Jeddingen. All guns of the two anti-aircraft batteries were lost on the Aller and Weser.

The remnants of the division were on 20 April in the area south of Bremen. Of the original almost 13,000 men, only 3,000 remained on 21 April after two weeks of heavy fighting. On 23 April, the remnants of the division settled in the Cuxhaven area, where they were used again against the 21st Army Group. On 28 April 1945, the remnants were returned to Meldorf an der Elbe, while the approximately 750 men were withdrawn behind the Kaiser Wilhelm Canal and were used as an alarm unit in the Albersdorf and Hemmingstedt area. At the end of the war, the remains of the division were at Bunsoh where it surrendered to the British.

== Organisation ==
The division's target structure was that of the 'Volksgrenadier Division', though this was never achieved. The division had no heavy weapons and was mainly equipped with small arms and panzerfausts. The 2nd Marine Engineer Battalion was never established, with the establishment of the 2nd Marine Intelligence Division and 2nd Marine Field Replacement Battalion also never completed, along with the 200th Marine Supply Regiment never operational due to a lack of vehicles.

The organisation of the division was as follows (with German title in parentheses, those in italics were never fully formed):

- 2nd Marine Division Headquarters (2. Marine Division Stab)
  - Division Headquarters (Stab)
  - 2nd Marine Intelligence Division (2. Marine-Nachrichten-Abteilung)
  - 5th Marine Grenadier Regiment (5. Marine Grenadier Regiment)
  - 6th Marine Grenadier Regiment (6. Marine Grenadier Regiment)
  - 7th Marine Grenadier Regiment (7. Marine Grenadier Regiment)
  - 2nd Marine Division Fusilier Battalion (2. Marine Division Füsilier Bataillon)
  - 2nd Marine Division Field Replacement Battalion (2. Marine Division Feldersatzbataillon)
  - 2nd Marine Artillery Regiment (2. Marine Artillerie Regiment)
  - 4th Battery, 117th Anti-Aircraft Regiment (Luftwaffe troops)
  - 4th Battery, 162nd Anti-Aircraft Regiment (Luftwaffe troops)
  - 2nd Marine Tank Destroyer Battalion (2. Marine Panzerjäger Bataillon)
  - 2nd Marine Engineer Battalion (2. Marine Ingenieur Bataillon)
  - 200th Marine Supply Regiment (200. Marine-Versorgungs-Regiment)

== Notable individuals ==
=== Commanders ===
The divisional commanders included:

- 11 February 1945 – 8 April 1945: Vice Admiral Ernst Scheurlen
- 8 April 1945 – 10 April 1945: Naval Captain Werner Hartmann
- 10 April 1945–surrender: Army Colonel Werner, Count von Bassewitz-Levetzow

=== Other persons ===
The 2nd Marine Division was the superior formation of German soldier Kurt Albrecht, who was executed for desertion on 28 April 1945 as one of Nazi Germany's last death sentences. Albrecht's death became a topic of interest for a group of 12th grade students in Osterholz-Scharmbeck, after which the local government was convinced to rename a footpath after Albrecht. This makes him one of very few German enlisted men of World War II for whom public places in Germany are named.
