= Gesellschaft für Sport und Technik =

Sport and Technology Association
- Gesellschaft für Sport und Technik
- Successor: Vereinigung Technischer Sportverbände
- Founded: 7 August 1952
- Dissolved: 27 January 1990
- Headquarters: East Berlin, East Germany
- Members: 650.000 (1989)
- Chairman of the Central Board: Günter Kutzschebauch (1982–1990)
- Main organ: Central Board
- Parent organization: Ministry of the Interior (de jure); Security Affairs Department of the Central Committee of the SED (de facto)

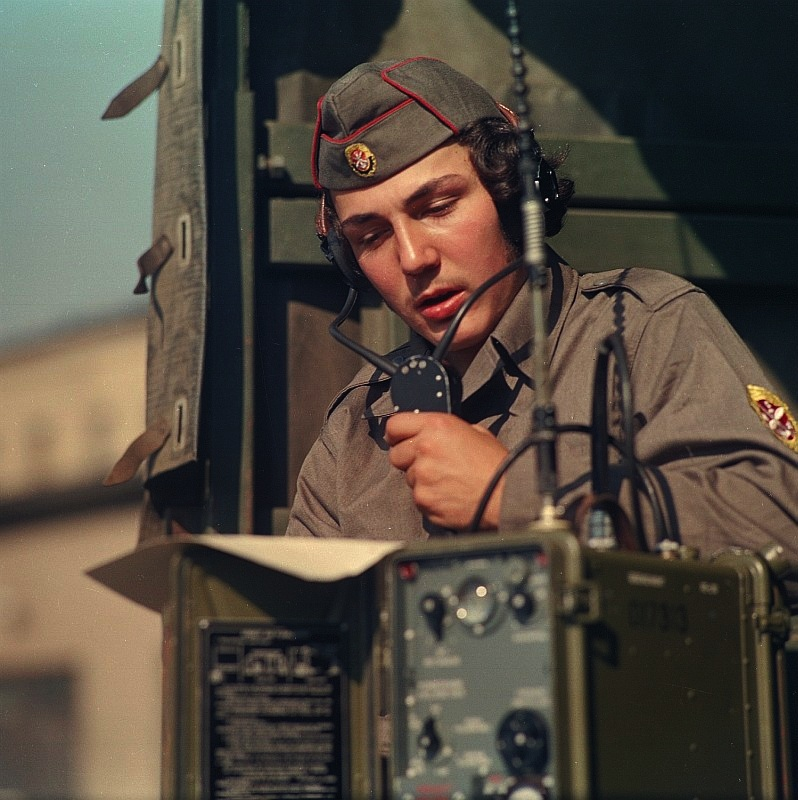
GST radio operator, 1976

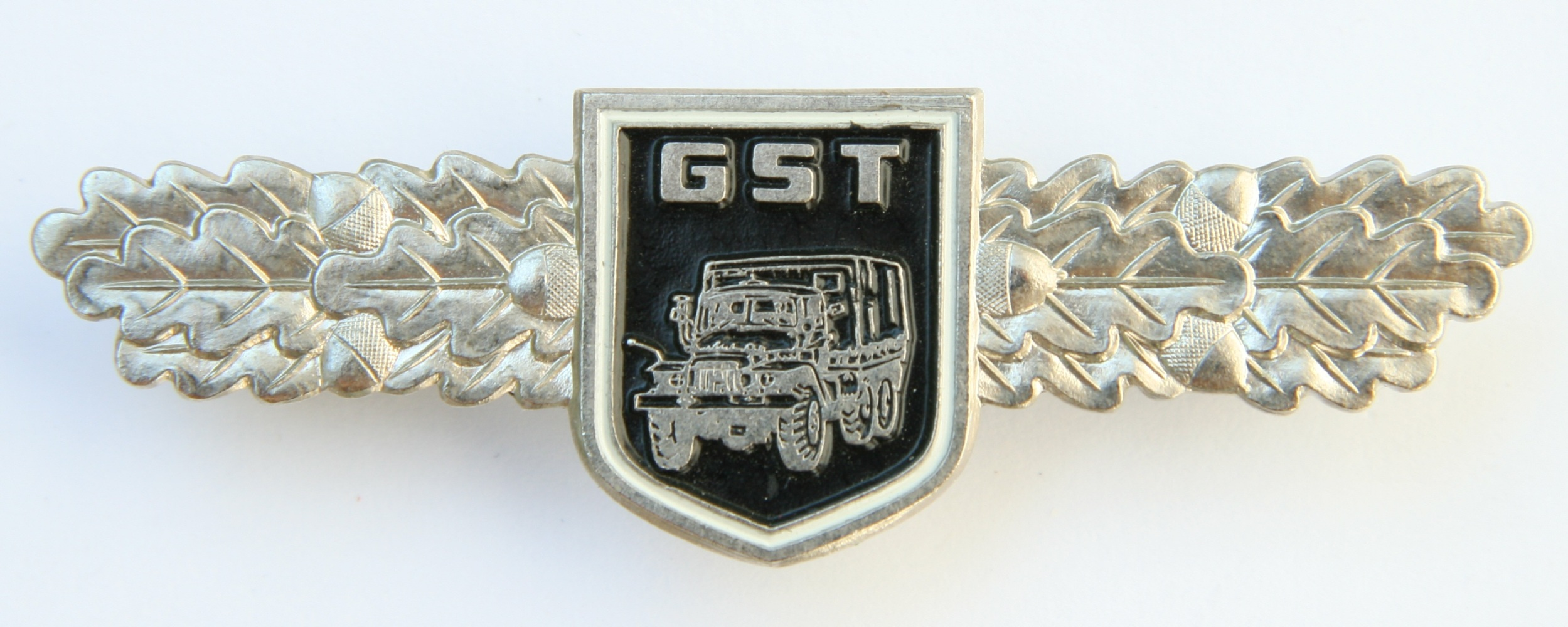
GST motorists qualification badge

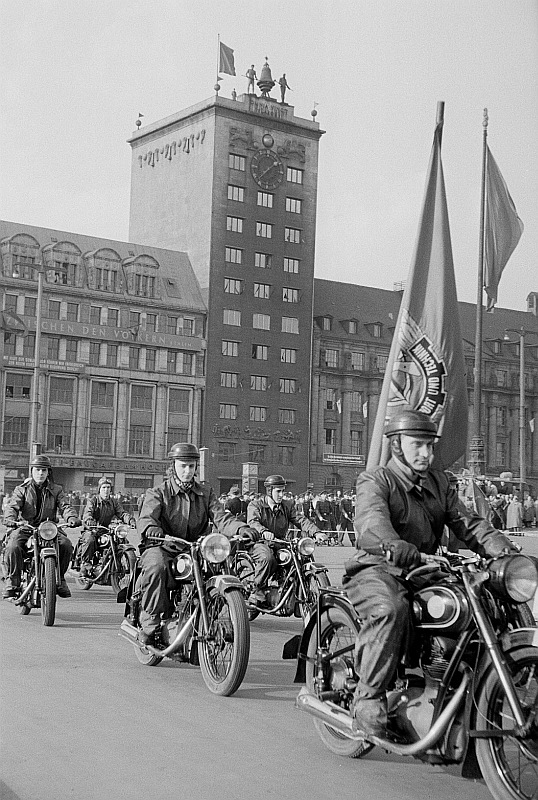
GST Motorcycle convoy in Leipzig, 1953

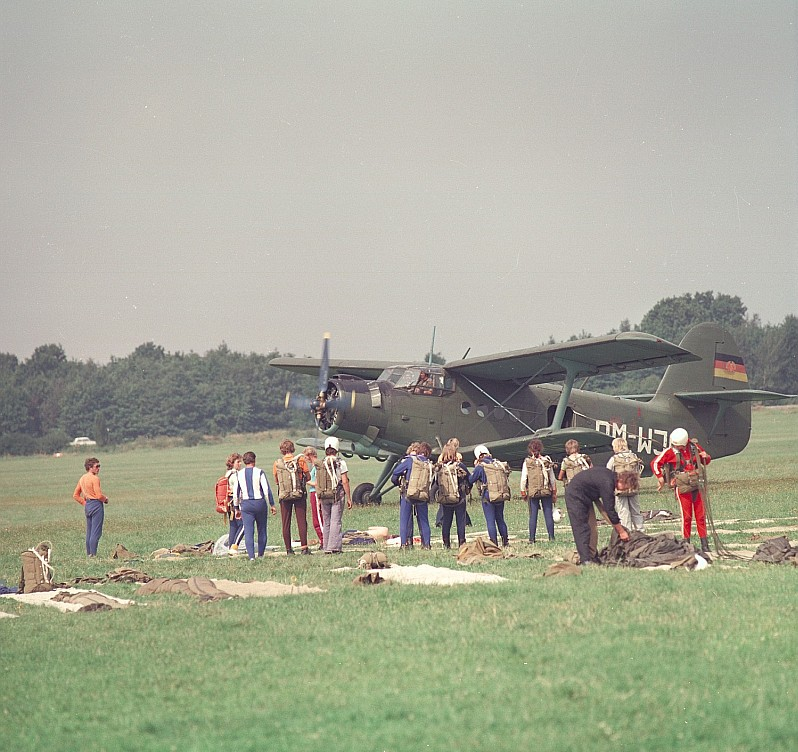
GST parachutists at the Gera-Leumnitz airfield, 1977

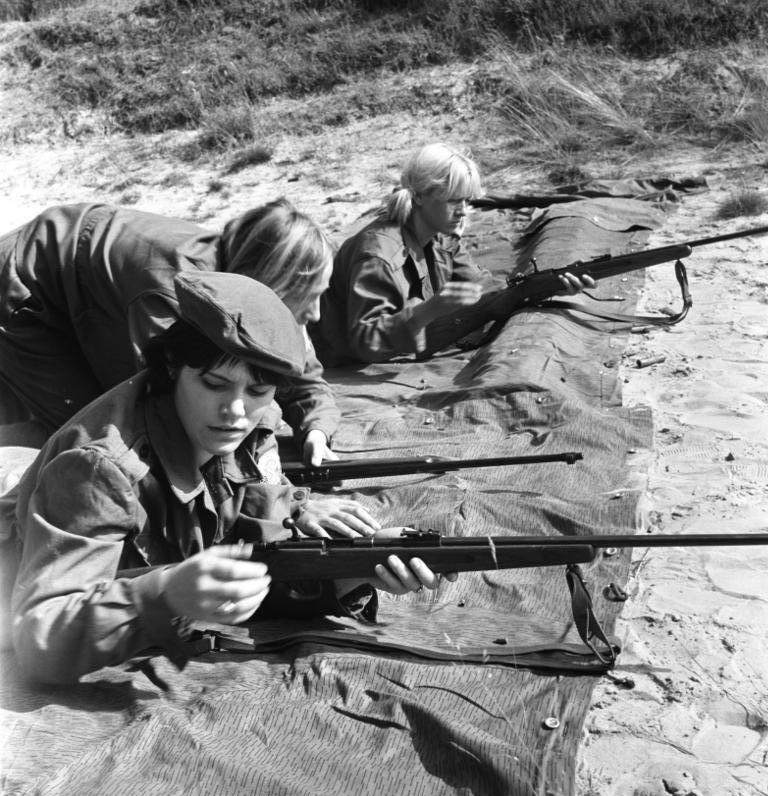
Target practice with small bore rifles near Mirow in preparation of the GST Third Central Championships, 1967

The Gesellschaft für Sport und Technik (GST), lit. "Sport and Technology Association", was one of the East German mass organizations. Officially, it was established to structure the free time of young people interested in sports and technology in group activities, provide the required technical equipment (for example, motorcycles, aircraft, radios), cultivate and support technical sport disciplines, and arrange for events like motor and shooting competitions. The association also contributed to the militarization of East German society by organizing together with the National People's Army the country's mandatory pre-military training (VA, vormilitärische Ausbildung) in schools, universities and workplaces. It was established on 7 August 1952 and disbanded in early 1990. The association published a monthly, 32-page periodical, S+T (Sport und Technik).

== Mission ==
The Gesellschaft für Sport und Technik (GST) was originally established to structure through group activities the free time of people of all ages who were interested in sports and technology. This included adolescents, who were to be given an opportunity to engage in meaningful leisure activities. Older, more experienced members were expected to take beginners under their wing and give them support. Most of the required equipment (such as motorcycles, boats, automobiles, trucks, airplanes, radios, rifles, workshops and even animals) was provided, and maintained and serviced by both the members themselves and permanent employees. But the mission soon changed; military sports became increasingly predominant, and the organization evolved into a "school for tomorrow's soldiers". It operated training bases, shooting ranges and military training camps, and held competitions.

Even if they were not members, almost all young men and women came into contact with the GST because it organized the pre-military training exercises mandated by East Germany's Military Service Law. Without participating in this training, access to university and career training was usually blocked.

Some secondary school students were GST members, which was also the case for trainees in large concerns. They paid only a token membership fee. How much emphasis was placed on military matters depended to a great extent on the trainers at the schools. In addition to general pre-military training there were also military camps (taking place for boys over two weeks at the end of the 9th grade), a so-called "Qualification March" (Marsch der Bewährung) for about five days each year either in the course of vocational training or once at the end of the 11th grade in secondary schools, and competitions.

But the organization also united in its ranks young people and adults of both sexes with the goal of improving their physical fitness, equipping them with technical knowledge, and in general cultivating expertise and abilities useful for military and international sports competitions. It frequently offered the only possibility to legally engage in certain sports, like gliding, flying motorized aircraft, shooting, and diving.

The range of leisure activities was reduced more and more starting in the 1970s, for example, sport gliding in locations near the West German border after a number of GDR citizens successfully managed to get through the inner German border to West Germany using various types of flying machines.

GST members had an opportunity to obtain a driver's license for trucks, cars, motorcycles or mopeds. For many young people this was a primary reason for joining the GST.

About one percent of the expenses were covered in the country's defense budget; the rest had to be financed by other state institutions, as the income from membership fees was insignificant. Members received uniforms, ranks, performance badges and medals. The governing board was dominated by full-time personnel with military background, usually former career soldiers.

In 1979 the GST had about 530,000 members in over 9,000 local divisions, a number that had risen to 600,000 by 1988. In addition to these divisions, which usually had their own areas of specialization, GST as an East German mass organization was organized according to the rules of what was called "democratic centralism" as to its basic organizations, county and district boards, and central governing board. The basic organizations existed in factories and workplaces, vocational schools, secondary schools, universities and colleges, administrative bodies and producers' cooperatives. The highest organ of the Gesellschaft für Sport und Technik was according to its statutes a congress which usually met every five years and had the task of electing the central governing board.

One goal of the organization was to obtain voluntary, well-qualified and dedicated recruits for career service in the National People's Army. This became increasingly difficult to achieve starting in the 1980s as most members were uninterested in volunteering for extended military service.

== Sport disciplines ==
Various sport disciplines were organized into official East German groupings under the aegis of the GST:

- East German Alliance of German Marksmen
- East German Aerial and Parachute Sports Association
- East German Multiple Military Sports Association
- Model Sports Association
- Motor Sports Association
- East German Amateur Radio Association
- East German Marine Sports Association
- East German Sport Divers Association
- Military Combat Sports Association

For some disciplines, subsections of the main organizations were established, for example for:

- Equestrian Sports
- Guard Dogs
- Hunting
- Pigeon Racing

== Chairmen of the GST ==
Chairman	NVA rank	Tenure
Head of the GST; Leiter der GST
Arno Berthold	Oberst	7 August 1952 – 3 January 1955
Richard Staimer	Generalmajor	4 January 1955 – 27 February 1963
Chairman of the Central Board of the GST; Vorsitzender des Zentralvorstandes der GST
Kurt Lohberger	Generalmajor	1 March 1963 – 1 February 1968
Günther Teller	Generalleutnant	1 February 1968 – 28 June 1982†
Kurt Krämer (acting)	Generalmajor	28 June 1982 – 24 November 1982
Günter Kutzschebauch	Vizeadmiral	24 November 1982 – 28 January 1990
Head of the Working Committee of the VTSV; Leiter des Arbeitsausschusses der VTSV
Dieter Sommer	unknown	28 January 1990 – 31 December 1990

== Symbols ==
The association's emblem was a red oval with an anchor, propeller blade and rifle, surrounded by golden ears of grain and a cogwheel. The GST flag was red, with the symbol at the center.

== Equipment ==
In 1986/87 the association had at its disposal:

- 3,500 motor vehicles of various types, including 1,334 driver training trucks
- 17,384 motorcycles, heavyweight and lightweight
- 33 schooling ships and training motorboats
- 529 motorboats and cutters
- 167 aircraft
- 472 gliders
- 10,026 telecommunications devices
- 48,000 small-bore machine guns (including 40,000 unused model KK-Mpi stored)
- 50,000 small-bore rifles
- 106,000 air guns
- 1,154 armories
- 8,741 shooting lanes (as distinguished from shooting ranges)
- 12 central training centers and schools
- 35 airfields
