= Karl Witzell =

German naval officer (1884–1976)

- Born: 18 October 1884; Hiersfeld near Wesel, Rhine Province
- Died: 31 May 1976 (aged 91); West-Berlin
- Military career
- Allegiance: German Empire (to 1918); Weimar Republic (to 1933); Nazi Germany
- Branch: Imperial German Navy; Reichsmarine; Kriegsmarine
- Service years: 1902–42
- Rank: Generaladmiral
- Units: SMS Elbing; SMS Frankfurt; SMS Graudenz; SMS Schleswig-Holstein; SMS Braunschweig
- Conflicts: World War I World War II
- Awards: Knight's Cross of the War Merit Cross
- Other work: Deutsche Gesellschaft für Wehrtechnik

Karl Witzell (18 October 1884, Hiersfeld near Wesel – 31 May 1976, Berlin) was a German naval officer who rose to the rank of General Admiral in the Kriegsmarine of Nazi Germany. He was the head of the Marinewaffenhauptamt (Marine Ordnance Office) since the mid 1930s and during the Second World War.

== Naval career ==
Witzell joined the Imperial German Navy as a midshipman on 1 April 1902, and completed his basic training on the training ship Moltke. He subsequently took part in various foreign voyages with a cruiser squadron. He then spent several years in the German leased territory of Kiautschou, as a company officer and adjutant in the land-based coastal artillery department. After his return home, from April to September 1913, he was assigned to the 2nd Naval Inspectorate. Witzell was then transferred to the battleship Oldenburg as a Kapitänleutnant and artillery officer. In this capacity, he was awarded the Knight's Cross of the Order of the Dannebrog and remained on the ship of the line until the start of the First World War, serving there until early September 1915. He was then transferred as an artillery officer to the light cruiser Elbing, with which he participated in the Battle of Jutland on 31 May 1916. For his service, he was awarded both classes of the Iron Cross and the Friedrich August Cross. From 2 June to 31 August 1916 Witzell served as the deputy artillery officer on the light cruiser Frankfurt before being transferred to the Graudenz as navigation officer and first officer, a position he held until the end of the war.

On 2 February 1920 he was assigned to the Wilhelmshaven shore command as an artillery officer and became a member of a sub-commission of the Marine Peace Commission. In this role, he attempted to negotiate with the victorious powers regarding the artillery defense options for the German coast. On 29 June 1920 Witzell was promoted to Korvettenkapitän, and on 5 February 1921 he was appointed head of the weapons department of the naval command. He briefly served as first officer on the ship of the line Braunschweig from 11 to 31 January 1926, and in the same role from 1 February 1926 to 30 September 1927, on the Schleswig-Holstein, where he was promoted to Fregattenkapitän on 1 April 1927. He then returned to his duties as a department head. On 1 October 1928 he was appointed Chef der Marinewaffenabteilung (Chief of the Naval Weapons Department), and on 1 October 1934 he became the Chef des Marinewaffenamtes (Chief of the Naval Ordnance Office). During this period, he was promoted to Kapitän zur See on 1 December 1928, and to konteradmiral on 1 September 1933. Witzell remained in his post after the creation of the Kriegsmarine, where he played a crucial role in the development and construction of naval weapons. The Marinewaffenhauptamt oversaw the development, testing and production of naval weapons of all kinds, as well as electronic counter-measures and radio communications.

=== Kriegsmarine ===
During the interwar period, Witzell, like Chief of the German Navy High Command Erich Raeder, was an advocate of a powerful surface navy that included the heaviest ships. He argued that only the largest vessels could allow an Atlantic striking force to effectively break through and destroy British trade routes. Witzell, Raeder, and many others in the naval staff continued to strongly believe in the importance of capital ships and surface vessels. This perspective ultimately contributed to the development of Plan Z in January 1939.

After the outbreak of the Second World War, he became Chef des Marinewaffenhauptamtes (Head of the Naval Weapons Main Office) in the Kriegsmarine high command on 7 November 1939 and was promoted to Generaladmiral on 1 April 1941. Witzell, along with field marshal Erhard Milch, the Generalluftzeugmeister (Chief of Air Equipment) for the Air Force, and general Emil Leeb, Chief of the Waffenamt (Army Ordnance Office), served on the Rüstungsamt (Armaments Committee). Formed on 6 May 1942, under the leadership of Reich Minister Albert Speer, this committee aimed to centralize the research and development efforts of the three branches of the Armed Forces. By establishing a unified planning agency, the committee sought to streamline ordnance research and optimize resource allocation, ensuring better-coordinated advancements in military technology across the Heer, Luftwaffe, and Kriegsmarine.

He left active service on 31 August 1942. He was appointed as a council member of the Reichsforschungsrat (Reich Research Council) and was awarded the Knight's Cross of the War Merit Cross with Swords on 6 October 1942, "in recognition of his great services to weapons development and the armament of the German Reich."

Although his military career had ended, Witzell became a Russian prisoner of war in May 1945 and was sentenced to 25 years in prison for war crimes by a military tribunal in the Soviet Union on 25 June 1950. On 7 October 1955 he returned to West Germany with the last German prisoners of war from the Soviet Union. He later became a founding member of the Deutsche Gesellschaft für Wehrtechnik, a lobbying organization for the German arms industry.

== Decorations ==
- Knight's Cross of the Order of the Dannebrog
- Friedrich August Cross, Second and First Class
- Prussian Service award
- Iron Cross (1914)
  - 2nd Class
  - 1st Class
- Honour Cross of the World War 1914/1918
- Wehrmacht Long Service Award 4th to 1st Class with Oak Leaves
- Iron Cross (1939)
  - 2nd Class
  - 1st Class
- War Merit Cross with Swords
  - 2nd Class
  - 1st Class
- Knight's Cross of the War Merit Cross with Swords on 6 October 1942 as Generaladmiral and Chef des Marinewaffenhauptamtes
