= Markus Krause-Traudes =

German admiral

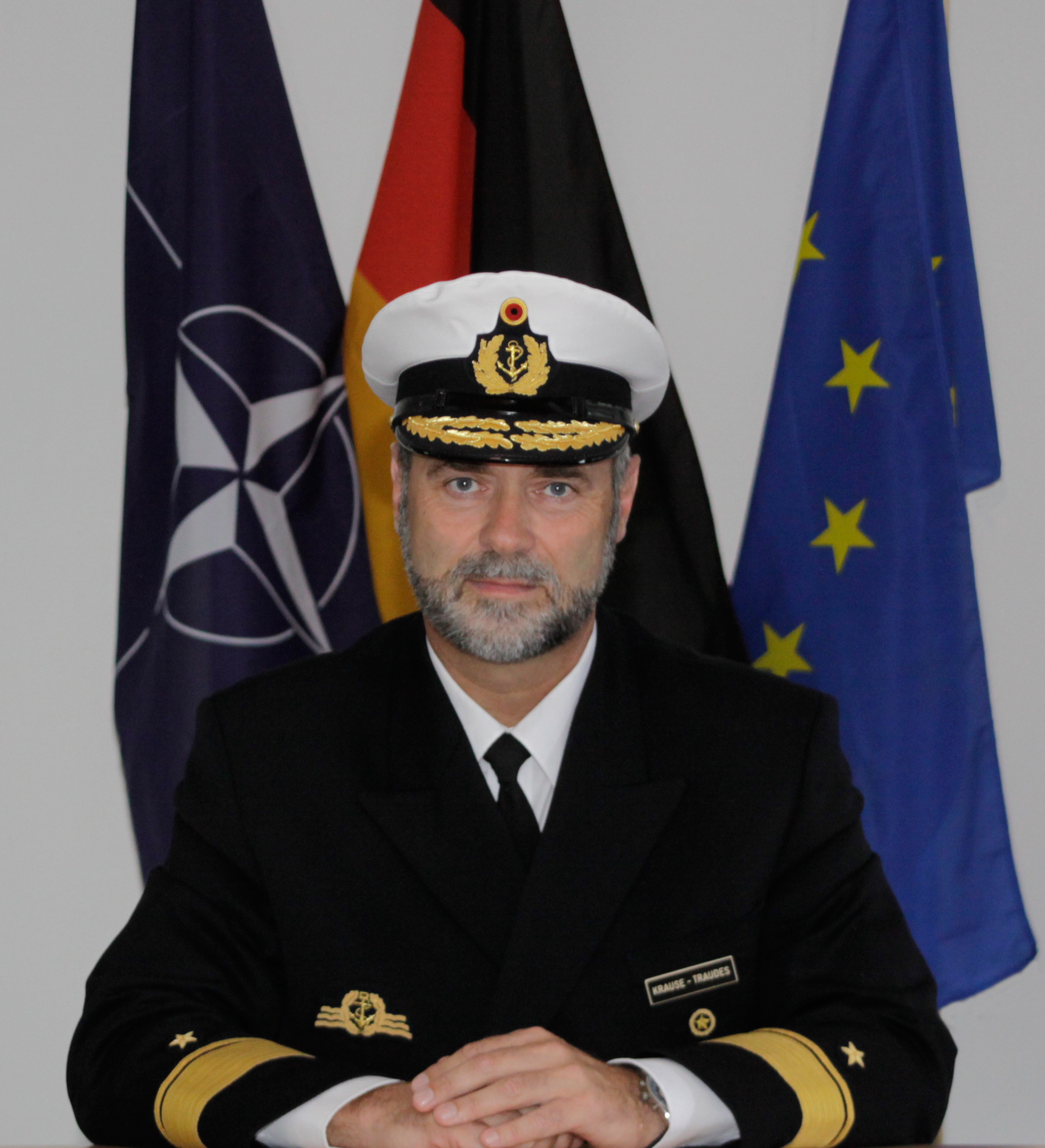
- Born: 27 December 1957 (age 68); Frankfurt am Main, Germany
- Military career
- Allegiance: Germany
- Branch: German Navy
- Service years: 1976–present
- Rank: Flottillenadmiral
- Awards: Bundeswehr Cross of Honour in Gold; NATO Medal for Contribution in Monitoring the Embargo against Former Yugoslavia; German Armed Forces Badge for Military Proficiency in Gold; United Nations Medal for Contribution to the United Nations Special Commission (UNSCOM)

Markus Krause-Traudes (born 27 December 1957) is a Flottillenadmiral (one-star admiral) of the German Navy, who has served as Deputy Chief of Staff, Operations, at the Multinational Joint Headquarters Ulm since April 2012.

== Military career ==
=== Education and early career ===
Krause-Traudes joined the Navy in 1976 and successfully completed training as an officer. From August 1980 to June 1983, he studied Naval Weapons Engineering at the Royal Naval Engineering College HMS Thunderer in Manadon, Plymouth, United Kingdom, graduating with a Bachelor of Science (Honours) degree. Following an assignment as commanding officer of the Tiger-class fast attack craft S 42 ILTIS with the 3rd Fast Patrol Boat Squadron, he became a career soldier and completed a course in marine electronics for the class 103B destroyer weapon system. From 1987 to 1989, he served as command and control systems officer aboard the German destroyer Rommel and marine electronics officer aboard the German destroyer Mölders (D186).

=== Staff officer assignments ===
After being promoted to the rank of Korvettenkapitän, Krause-Traudes took command of the Gepard-class fast attack craft S 74 NERZ in late September 1990. In October 1991, he went to attend the 33rd National General and Admiral Staff Officer Course at the Bundeswehr Command and Staff College in Hamburg, Germany. Upon being transferred to the Federal Ministry of Defence (Germany), he was promoted to the rank of Fregattenkapitän in September 1993. At the ministry, he was assistant chief of branch for Bundeswehr operations abroad with the Armed Forces Staff until September 1994. In this function, the focus of his work was on the UNSCOM mission in Iraq and UNOMIG in Georgia.

After one year in Bonn, Krause-Traudes returned aboard the destroyer ROMMEL (D 187) in 1994 where he initially served as executive officer and subsequently, from September 1995 to September 1997, as commanding officer. He was then once again transferred to Bonn and assigned to the German Chancellery as assistant chief of branch for military aspects of security policy under both the Kohl and Schröder administrations. From August 1999, he worked at the Chancellery’s new headquarters in Berlin. This assignment ended in April 2000.

For his next tour of duty, he embarked aboard various flagships for STANAVFORLANT, serving as Chief of Staff under the command of an American and a Portuguese admiral until June 2001.

In July 2001, he assumed a position as assistant chief of branch with the Joint Support Service Staff (Central Affairs branch) and liaison officer for the Chief of Staff of the German Joint Support Service in Berlin. In March 2003, he was assigned to the Bundeswehr Command and Staff College as a lecturer with the Department of Navy Doctrine where his responsibilities included the conceptual design and further development of curricular contents taught to the Bundeswehr maritime forces. During this tour, he was promoted to the rank of Kapitän zur See in September 2003. In November 2005, Krause-Traudes was assigned to the newly established Response Forces Operations Command in Ulm, Germany. In his function as assistant chief of staff of the Training and Exercise division, he served under the command of Lieutenant General Jan Oerding until May 2008. As part of this assignment, he was in charge of designing and conducting "European Endeavour" (EE) – a series of joint military exercises with German and multinational participants.

Krause-Traudes then returned to the Federal Ministry of Defence in Bonn for another tour of duty from 2008 to 2012 to become chief of branch for Concepts and International Cooperation with the Naval Staff, followed by a position as chief of branch for Future Development, Maritime and Joint Support with the Ministry’s Directorate-General for Planning until 2012.

=== Flag officer assignments ===
At the end of April 2012, Krause-Traudes reported as Deputy Chief of Staff Operations to the Response Forces Operations Command in Ulm, Germany. He was promoted to Flottillenadmiral effective as of 1 May 2012. From July to December 2012, Krause-Traudes was the designated Force Commander of the EU Battlegroup. From summer 2013 until Oktober 2016 he took office as Deputy Chief of Staff Support to the Response Forces Operations Command. Upon returning to the Navy in July 2017, he worked for the Director Operations of the Maritime Command in Rostock until December 2019. He retired with the beginning of the year 2020.

=== Honours and awards ===
- Bundeswehr Cross of Honour in Gold
- NATO Medal for Contribution in Monitoring the Embargo against Former Yugoslavia
- German Armed Forces Badge for Military Proficiency in Gold
- United Nations Medal for Contribution to the United Nations Special Commission (UNSCOM)

== Personal life ==
Krause-Traudes is married and has four grown children.
