= Flottenschule "Walter Steffens" =

Coordinates: 54.3606°N 13.0817°E

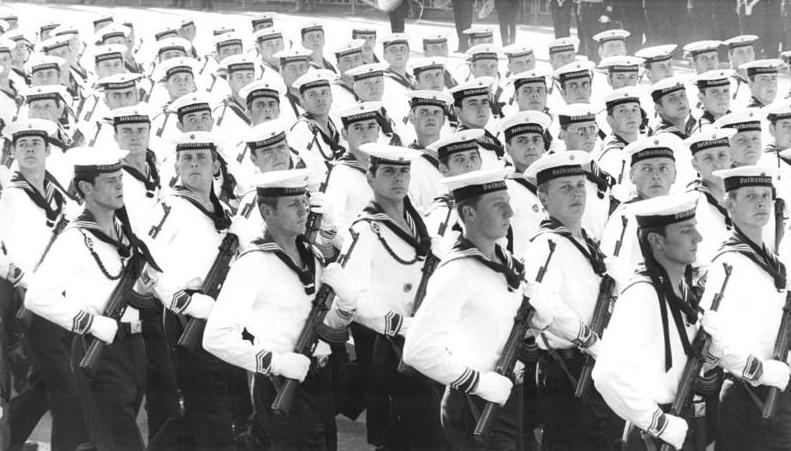

The fleet school Flottenschule “Walter Steffens” in Parow, Germany, was the training center for non-commissioned officers and men of the Volksmarine (People's Navy) of the German Democratic Republic. It was established in 1950 as the Seepolizeischule Parow (Naval Police School Parow) and renamed on 1 December 1970, after its founder as Fleet School Walter Steffens. It was disbanded after German reunification in 1990. In 1992 the Marinetechnikschule (Naval Engineering School) of the Bundesmarine (German Navy) was established on this site.

== History ==
On 1 March 1950 Seepolizei-Inspektors (“Maritime Police Inspector”) Walter Steffens received an order to rebuild a naval police school on a former World War II naval aviation field (Seefliegerhorst) in Parow. The first recruits arrived on 1 August 1950, which marked the official opening date of the school. Walter Steffens was the first Director of the school, and on 1 December 1970 the school was given the traditions name of "Walter Steffens" to honor him.

Between 1950 and 1990, all sailors and non-commissioned officers of the people's Navy trained at this school. The training periods for non-commissioned officers and sailors were from 6 to 10 months. In 1984, training times were reduced to 2 months.

Under Order the Chief of the Volksmarine 96/90 the Flottenschule "Walter Steffens" was disbanded on 3 October 1990 and was not transferred to the Bundeswehr. The site has been used since 1992 by the Bundesmarine Marinetechnikschule (Naval Engineering School).

Since the 1970s training was offered at Parnow in the following fields:

- Seafaring and weapons technology careers
- Wireless and radio career
- Machinist-technical careers
- Qualification for the Officer School of the Volksmarine

Various training ships were used at the school, to include:

- Mine warfare ship, type 43
- Schwalbe class mine warfare ship
- Habicht (Hawk) class mine warfare ship
- Krake (Octopus) class Mine warfare ship, 1970–1976
- Kondor (Condor) class mine warfare ship
- Kondor II class Mine warfare ship
- Shershen class Torpedo boat, TSB project 206
- Osa class missile boat

== Commanders ==
- 1970 - 1973 Kapitän zur See Thude
- 1973 - 1974 Kapitän zur See Nitz
- 1974 - 1983 Konteradmiral Wegner
- 1983 - 1990 Konteradmiral Nitz
