= Klaus von Dambrowski =

- Born: 16 February 1953 (age 73)
- Allegiance: Germany
- Branch: German Navy
- Service years: 1972–
- Rank: Konteradmiral
- Commands: German frigate Niedersachsen

Klaus von Dambrowski (German pronunciation: [ˈklaʊs ˈfɔn ˈdambro:vˌskɪ]; born 16 February 1953) is a Konteradmiral of the German Navy and Chief of Staff of the Navy Command.

== Military career ==
=== Education and early service ===
Von Dambrowski entered the Bundeswehr in 1972, and completed the requisite training to become a career naval officer. After completing the "A" course on remote signalling/tracking, he studied pedagogy and educational science at the University of the Bundeswehr Hamburg from October to May 1977, earning a master's degree in teaching. Thereafter, he served from May 1978 to September 1979 as a telecommunications officer on the destroyer Zerstörer 4. Subsequently, he served from October 1979 until September 1980 as a training officer.

After the completion of the "B" course for remote signalling/tracking, von Dambrowski took a posting as a course director at the Naval Academy Mürwik from October 1980 to September 1981. From October 1982 to September 1986, he served aboard the destroyer Mölders as tracking and command officer at the weapons control panel. This was followed by a posting as the telecommunications officer on the staff of the 1st Destroyer Squadron, from 1986 to September 1987.

=== Service as a staff officer ===
Von Dambrowski took the 29th National General and Admiral Staff Officer Course from October 1987 to September 1989 at the Führungsakademie der Bundeswehr in Hamburg and thereafter was promoted to Korvettenkapitän (lieutenant commander). After this course, von Dambrowski was first officer aboard the destroyer Schleswig-Holstein from October 1989 until March 1991, under Commander Wolfgang Jungmann. Subsequently he was transferred to Bonn, where he served in the Parliament and Cabinet Department of the Federal Ministry of Defense from April 1991 to March 1994.

From April 1994 to March 1996, von Dambrowski was commander of the frigate Niedersachsen. During this time he was part of the working group "Streitkräfteeinsatz 2020" in the Office for Studies and Exercises of the Bundeswehr, from October 1995 to June 1996. In July 1996, he returned to the Federal Ministry of Defense, where he took over the post of adviser for operational policy issues in the Naval Staff. In July 1998, he joined the staff office for military policy of the Bundeswehr's staff, serving until January 2000 as advisor for European security and defense policy.

In February 2000, he was transferred to Bremerhaven, where he was posted to the Naval Operations School until March 2003. Back at the Federal Ministry of Defense in Bonn, he was the head of the department for conceptual issues and international cooperation in the Naval Staff from April 2003 to January 2005. From January 2005 to June 2006 he served at the Defense Ministry's Berlin offices as deputy chief of planning for the Bundeswehr's staff.

=== Service as an admiral ===
In June 2006, von Dambrowski returned to Bonn, where he served in the Naval Staff as the head of staff division III, responsible for design, planning and management, in the rank of Flottillenadmiral (flotilla admiral). He served during the tenures of Axel Schimpf and Hans-Jochen Witthauer as Chiefs of Naval Staff. On 29 September 2009, von Dambrowski took over the post of deputy commander and chief of staff of the intervention forces' operational command (Kommando Operative Führung Eingreifkräfte) from Major General Rainer Fiegle, serving under Wolf-Dieter Langheld and then Markus Bentler. While still in this office, he was promoted to Konteradmiral. In October 2012, he became the first Chief of Staff of the German Navy's new unified high command, the Navy Command in Rostock.

== Personal life ==
Von Dambrowski is married and has three sons.
