= Ernst Scheurlen =

German admiral (1894–1945)

- Born: 5 December 1894; Strasbourg, Imperial Territory of Alsace-Lorraine, German Empire
- Died: 8 April 1945 (aged 50); Groß Eilstorf near Walsrode, Lüneburg Heath, German Reich
- Relatives: ∞ 1918 Else Heyd; 3 children
- Military career
- Allegiance: German Empire (1912–1918); Weimar Republic (1919–1933); Nazi Germany (1933–1945)
- Branch: Imperial German Navy; Reichsmarine; Kriegsmarine
- Service years: 1912–1945
- Rank: Vizeadmiral
- Commands: Königsberg (1938–1939); 2nd Marine Division (1945)
- Conflicts: World War I; World War II †
- Awards: Iron Cross; War Merit Cross; German Cross in Gold

Ernst Scheurlen (5 December 1894 – 8 April 1945) was a German admiral who served in the First and Second World Wars. He joined the Imperial German Navy as a cadet in 1912 and became an ensign in 1915. Scheurlen was selected to remain in the German navy, which was then the Reichsmarine, after the war and became a specialist in naval and coastal artillery. From 1938 to 1939 he commanded the light cruiser Königsberg. During the Second World War Scheurlen commanded coastal artillery in Pomerania and was considered for command of a transport fleet in the cancelled invasion of Britain. After the invasion of Russia he served on the naval staff in the Crimea, commanding a fleet during the evacuation of German troops from the Caucasus in 1943. After the Allied invasion of southern France Scheurlen commanded German naval forces in the region. In February 1945, with Germany being invaded Scheurlen was placed in command of a division hastily formed from surplus naval personnel and was killed in action.

== Early life and career ==
Scheurlen was born in Strasbourg, Alsace, (historically in France but then part of Germany) in 1894. He joined the Imperial German Navy as a cadet in 1912. He was commissioned as an ensign in 1915 and served on a tanker, a heavy cruiser and a minelaying vessel during the First World War. Scheurlen was one of the officers selected to join the Reichsmarine, Germany's post-war reduced navy. In the inter-war period, during which the navy became the Kriegsmarine, he specialised in naval and coastal artillery. He was promoted to captain in 1938. From November 1938 until June 1939 Scheurlen was captain of the light cruiser Königsberg and served in the Baltic Sea.

== Second World War ==
In the early part of the war Scheurlen commanded the naval artillery stationed on the Pomeranian coast. Scheurlen was to have commanded a transport fleet during Operation Sea Lion, the planned (and cancelled) German invasion of Britain. Following the German invasion of Russia Scheurlen served on the naval staff in the Crimea and in that role was promoted to the rank of rear admiral on 1 April 1942. Scheurlen commanded the transports and escorts used for the evacuation of 105,000 men, 45,000 horses, 12,000 wagons and 7,000 motorised vehicles from the Caucasus between January and March 1943 as a result of Russian offensives. He later returned to the Western Front to command coastal forces in the German Bight. On 25 March 1943, his only son, Leutnant zur See Hans Joachim Scheurlen, was killed in action when the German U-boat U-469 was sunk by a British aircraft north of Iceland.

In January 1944, he was the presiding judge in the court martial of Ernstel Jünger, son of the author and soldier Ernst Jünger. Ernstel was a naval cadet and had been denounced for defeatist remarks and listening to foreign radio broadcasts. Scheurlen reduced a heavier sentence to that of Frontbewährung, probation served on the front lines. Ernstel was killed by a gunshot in Italy in November combating partisans.

Scheurlen was promoted vice admiral on 1 August 1944 and commanded German forces on the southern French coast from 17 August. Scheurlen's appointment came after the start of the Allied invasion of Southern France. There were few German warships on the station and Scheurlen's appointment may have been because of his specialism in coastal artillery. In this role he ordered the scuttling of German vessels at Toulon to avoid them falling into Allied hands. On 6 September 1944 he returned to the German Bight.

He was appointed to command the 2nd Marine Division on 11 February 1945. The division was hastily formed in Schleswig-Holstein from surplus naval personnel to serve on land in the defence of Germany from Allied invasion. It deployed to the Weser River, south of Bremen on 7 April and fought against the British whilst retreating to the Elbe. Scheurlen was killed in action near Groß Eilstorf on the Lüneburg Heath on 8 April 1945. The war in Europe ended with Germany's surrender on 8 May 1945.
