= List of ships of World War II (Z) =

The List of ships of the Second World War contains major military vessels of the war, arranged alphabetically and by type. The list includes armed vessels that served during the war and in the immediate aftermath, inclusive of localized ongoing combat operations, garrison surrenders, post-surrender occupation, colony re-occupation, troop and prisoner repatriation, to the end of 1945. For smaller vessels, see also list of World War II ships of less than 1000 tons. Some uncompleted Axis ships are included, out of historic interest. Ships are designated to the country under which they operated for the longest period of the Second World War, regardless of where they were built or previous service history. Submarines show submerged displacement.

List of ships of World War II (Z)
Ship	Country or organization	Class	Type	Displacement (tons)	First commissioned	Fate
Z1 Leberecht Maass	Kriegsmarine	Type 1934	destroyer	2,259 t (2,223 long tons) (standard) (Note: Their deep loads were 3,207 t (3,156 long tons).)	14 January 1937	Sunk by a naval mine or bomb on 22 February 1940.
Z2 Georg Thiele	Kriegsmarine	Type 1934	destroyer	2,259 t (2,223 long tons) (standard)	27 February 1937	sunk 13 April 1940
Z3 Max Schultz	Kriegsmarine	Type 1934	destroyer	3,150	27 February 1937	sunk 22 February 1940
Z4 Richard Beitzen	Kriegsmarine	Type 1934	destroyer	3,150	13 May 1937	ceded to UK, scrapped 1947
Z5 Paul Jakobi	Kriegsmarine	Type 1934A	destroyer	2,206 t (2,171 long tons) (normal); 3,160 t (3,110 long tons) (deep load)	29 June 1937	ceded to UK, then to France February 1946 and renamed Desaix, scrapped 1958
Z6 Theodor Riedel	Kriegsmarine	Type 1934A	destroyer	3,100	2 July 1937	Ceded to UK, then to France February 1946, renamed Kleber, scrapped 1958
Z7 Hermann Schoemann	Kriegsmarine	Type 1934A	destroyer	3,100	9 September 1937	sunk 2 May 1942
Z8 Bruno Heinemann	Kriegsmarine	Type 1934A	destroyer	3,100	8 January 1938	sunk 25 January 1942
Z9 Wolfgang Zenker	Kriegsmarine	Type 1934A	destroyer	3,100	2 July 1938	scuttled 13 April 1940
Z10 Hans Lody	Kriegsmarine	Type 1934A	destroyer	3,100	13 September 1938	scrapped 1946 - 1949
Z11 Bernd von Arnim	Kriegsmarine	Type 1934A	destroyer	3,100	6 December 1938	scuttled 13 April 1940
Z12 Erich Giese	Kriegsmarine	Type 1934A	destroyer	3,100	4 March 1939	sunk 13 April 1940
Z13 Erich Koellner	Kriegsmarine	Type 1934A	destroyer	3,100	28 March 1939	sunk 13 April 1940
Z14 Friedrich Ihn	Kriegsmarine	Type 1934A	destroyer	3,100	6 April 1938	scrapped 1952
Z15 Erich Steinbrinck	Kriegsmarine	Type 1934A	destroyer	3,100	31 May 1938	ceded to USSR, 5 November 1945, renamed Pylikiy; scrapped 1958
Z16 Friedrich Eckoldt	Kriegsmarine	Type 1934A	destroyer	3,100	28 July 1938	sunk 31 December 1942
Z17 Diether von Roeder	Kriegsmarine	Type 1936	destroyer	4,400	29 August 1938	sunk 13 April 1940
Z18 Hans Lüdemann	Kriegsmarine	Type 1936	destroyer	3,400	8 October 1938	sunk 13 April 1940
Z19 Hermann Künne	Kriegsmarine	Type 1936	destroyer	3,400	12 January 1939	sunk 13 April 1940
Z20 Karl Galster	Kriegsmarine	Type 1936	destroyer	3,415	21 March 1939	scrapped 1956
Z21 Wilhelm Heidkamp	Kriegsmarine	Type 1936	destroyer	3,400	10 June 1939	sunk 10 April 1940
Z22 Anton Schmidt	Kriegsmarine	Type 1936	destroyer	3,400	24 September 1939	Sunk 10 April 1940
Z23	Kriegsmarine	Type 1936A	destroyer	3,605	15 September 1940	decommissioned 21 August 1944, scrapped in 1951.
Z24	Kriegsmarine	Type 1936A	destroyer	3,605	26 October 1940	sunk 25 August 1944
Z25	Kriegsmarine	Type 1936A	destroyer	3,605	30 November 1940	taken by France after war, scrapped in 1958.
Z26	Kriegsmarine	Type 1936A	destroyer	3,605	11 January 1941	sunk 29 March 1942
Z27	Kriegsmarine	Type 1936A	destroyer	3,605	26 February 1941	sunk 28 December 1943
Z28	Kriegsmarine	Type 1936A	destroyer	3,605	9 August 1941	sunk 3 March 1945
Z29	Kriegsmarine	Type 1936A	destroyer	3,605	25 June 1941	taken by Britain after war, given to US, scuttled 16 December 1946
Z30	Kriegsmarine	Type 1936A	destroyer	3,605	15 November 1941	taken by Norway after war, given to Britain, scrapped 1949
Z31	Kriegsmarine	Type 1936A Mob	destroyer	3,691	11 April 1942	taken by France after war, scrapped in 1958.
Z32	Kriegsmarine	Type 1936A Mob	destroyer	3,691	15 September 1942	destroyed 9 June 1944
Z33	Kriegsmarine	Type 1936A Mob	destroyer	3,691	6 February 1943	taken by Soviet Union after war, sunk as target ship 1961.
Z34	Kriegsmarine	Type 1936A Mob	destroyer	3,691	5 June 1943	taken by USA after war, scuttled 26 March 1946
Z35	Kriegsmarine	Type 1936B	destroyer	2,559 t (2,519 long tons)	22 September 1943	Sunk by a mine on 12 December 1944.
Z36	Kriegsmarine	Type 1936B	destroyer	2,559 t (normal); 3,599 t (3,542 long tons) (deep load)	19 February 1944	Sunk by a mine on 12 December 1944.
Z37	Kriegsmarine	Type 1936A Mob	destroyer	3,691	16 July 1942	scuttled 24 August 1944, scrapped in 1949
Z38	Kriegsmarine	Type 1936A Mob	destroyer	3,691	20 March 1943	taken by Britain after war, scrapped between 1949 and 1950.
Z39	Kriegsmarine	Type 1936A Mob	destroyer	3,691	21 August 1943	taken by Britain after war, scrapped in 1964.
Z40	Kriegsmarine	Type 1936B	destroyer	2,559 t (normal); 3,599 t (deep load)		Cancelled in 1940.
Z41	Kriegsmarine	Type 1936B	destroyer	2,559 t (normal); 3,599 t (deep load)		Cancelled in 1940.
Z42	Kriegsmarine	Type 1936B	destroyer			Cancelled in 1940.
Z43	Kriegsmarine	Type 1936B	destroyer	2,559 t (normal); 3,599 t (deep load)	31 May 1944	Scuttled on 3 May 1945.
Z44	Kriegsmarine	Type 1936B	destroyer			Sunk on 29 July 1944.
Z45	Kriegsmarine	Type 1936B	destroyer			Scrapped in 1946.
Zambesi	Royal Navy	Z	destroyer	1,830	18 July 1944	scrapped 1959
Zara	Regia Marina	Zara	heavy cruiser	11,500	20 October 1931	sunk 29 March 1941
Zealous	Royal Navy	Z	destroyer	1,830	9 October 1944	to Israel after war
Zebra	Royal Navy	Z	destroyer	1,830	13 October 1944	scrapped 1954
Zenith	Royal Navy	Z	destroyer	1,830	22 December 1944	to Egypt after war
Zephyr	Royal Navy	Z	destroyer	1,830	6 September 1944	paid off 1954
Zest	Royal Navy	Z	destroyer	1,830	12 July 1944	paid off July 1968
Zetland	Royal Navy	Hunt	destroyer	1,050	27 June 1942	paid off 20 April 1946, scrapped 1965
Zinnia	Royal Navy	Flower	corvette	925	30 March 1941	sunk 23 August 1941 by U-564
Zodiac	Royal Navy	Z	destroyer	1,830	23 October 1944	to Israel after war
Zuihō	Imperial Japanese Navy	Zuihō	light carrier	11,260	January 1941	sunk 25 October 1944
Zuikaku	Imperial Japanese Navy	Shōkaku	aircraft carrier	29,800	25 September 1941	25 October 1944
Zulu	Royal Navy	Tribal	destroyer	2,020	7 September 1938	sunk 14 September 1942
