= German destroyer Z21 Wilhelm Heidkamp =

German destroyer

Coordinates: 68°25′N 17°24′E

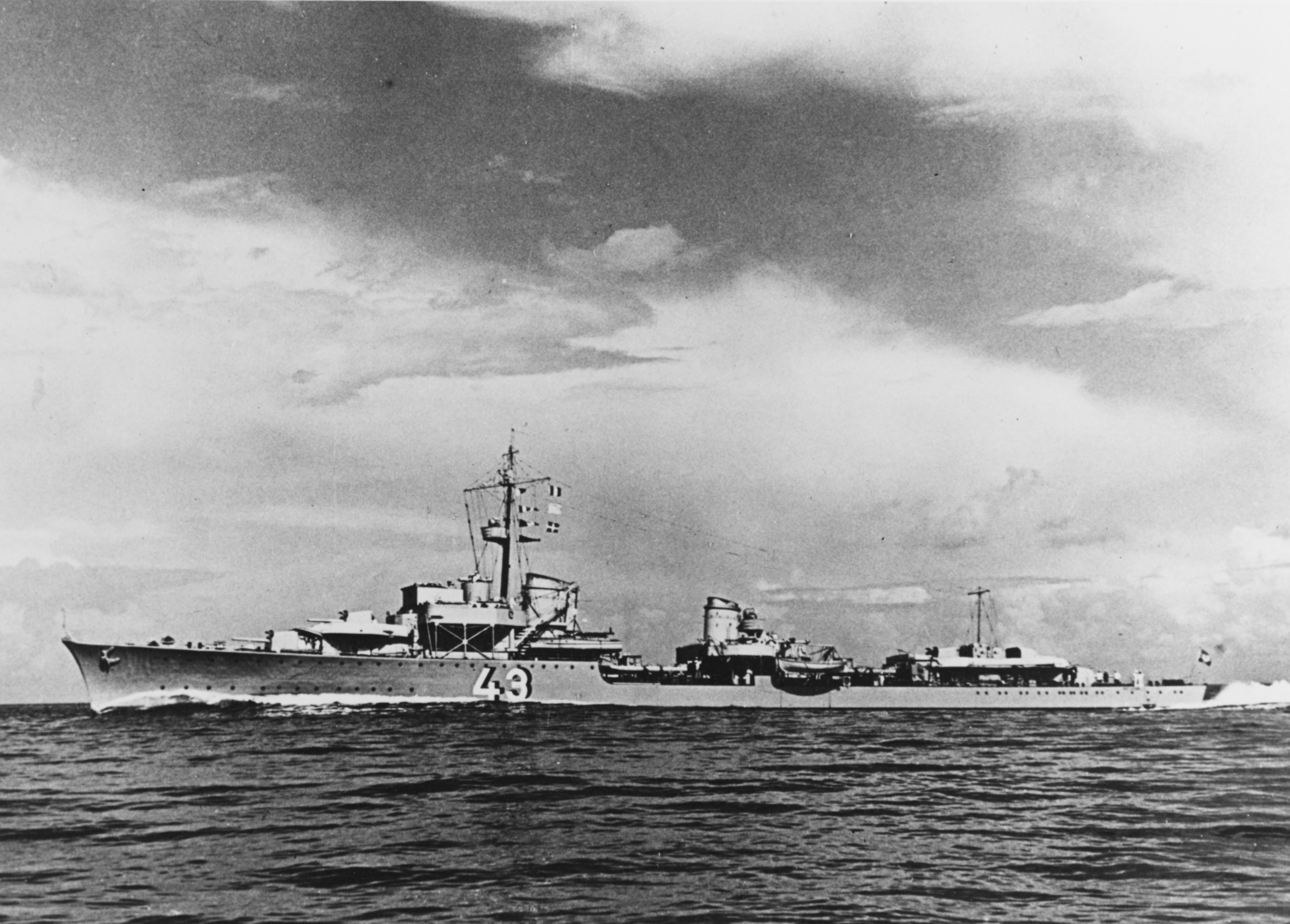
- Z21 Wilhelm Heidkamp underway, c. 1939

History

Nazi Germany
- Name: Z21 Wilhelm Heidkamp
- Namesake: Wilhelm Heidkamp
- Ordered: 6 January 1936
- Builder: AG Weser (Deschimag), Bremen
- Yard number: 923
- Laid down: 15 December 1936
- Launched: 20 August 1938
- Completed: 20 June 1939
- Fate: Sunk in the First Battle of Narvik, 11 April 1940

General characteristics
- Class & type: Type 1936 destroyer
- Displacement: 2,411 long tons (2,450 t) (standard); 3,415 long tons (3,470 t) (deep load)
- Length: 125.1 m (410 ft 5 in) (o/a)
- Beam: 11.8 m (38 ft 9 in)
- Draft: 4.5 m (14 ft 9 in)
- Installed power: 70,000 PS (51,000 kW; 69,000 shp); 6 × water-tube boilers
- Propulsion: 2 × shafts; 2 × geared steam turbine sets
- Speed: 36 knots (67 km/h; 41 mph)
- Range: 2,050 nmi (3,800 km; 2,360 mi) at 19 knots (35 km/h; 22 mph)
- Complement: 323
- Armament: 5 × single 12.7 cm (5 in) guns; 2 × twin 3.7 cm (1.5 in) AA guns; 6 × single 2 cm (0.79 in) AA guns; 2 × quadruple 53.3 cm (21 in) torpedo tubes; 4 × depth charge throwers; 60 mines

Z21 Wilhelm Heidkamp was one of six Type 1936 destroyers built for the Kriegsmarine (German Navy) in the late 1930s. Completed a few months before the start of World War II in September 1939, the ship served as a flagship throughout her career. She briefly patrolled the Skagerrak where she inspected neutral shipping for contraband goods. Z21 Wilhelm Heidkamp later helped to lay four offensive minefields off the English coast that claimed two British destroyers, 2 fishing trawlers, and twenty-seven merchant ships. During the German invasion of Norway in April 1940, she sank a Norwegian coastal defense ship off Narvik and was crippled with the opening shots of the First Naval Battle of Narvik on 10 April, with the loss of 81 crewmen. The ship sank the following day.

== Design and description ==
Z21 Wilhelm Heidkamp had an overall length of 125.10 meters (410 ft 5 in) and was 120 meters (393 ft 8 in) long at the waterline. The ship had a beam of 11.80 meters (38 ft 9 in), and a maximum draft of 4.50 meters (14 ft 9 in). She displaced 2,411 long tons (2,450 t) at standard load and 3,415 long tons (3,470 t) at deep load. The two Wagner geared steam turbine sets, each driving one propeller shaft, were designed to produce 70,000 PS (51,000 kW; 69,000 shp) using steam provided by six Wagner boilers for a designed speed of 36 knots (67 km/h; 41 mph). During Z21 Wilhelm Heidkamp's sea trials, she reached 37 knots (68.5 km/h; 42.6 mph) from 69,950 PS (51,450 kW; 68,990 shp), but a full-speed test was never conducted. The ship carried a maximum of 739 metric tons (727 long tons) of fuel oil which gave a range of 2,050 nautical miles (3,800 km; 2,360 mi) at 19 knots (35 km/h; 22 mph). Her crew consisted of 10 officers and 313 sailors.

The ship carried five 12.7-centimeter (5.0 in) SK C/34 guns in single mounts with gun shields, two each superimposed, fore and aft of the superstructure. The fifth mount was positioned on top of the rear deckhouse. The guns were numbered from 1 to 5 from front to rear. Her anti-aircraft armament consisted of four 3.7-centimeter (1.5 in) SK C/30 guns in two twin mounts abreast the rear funnel and six 2-centimeter (0.79 in) C/30 guns in single mounts. The ship carried eight above-water 53.3-centimeter (21.0 in) torpedo tubes in two power-operated mounts. Two reloads were provided for each mount. She had four depth charge launchers and mine rails could be fitted on the rear deck that had a maximum capacity of 60 mines. 'GHG' (Gruppenhorchgerät) passive hydrophones were fitted to detect submarines and an active sonar system was installed by the end of 1939.

== Construction and career ==
Z21 Wilhelm Heidkamp was named after Machinist's mate (Obermaschinist) Wilhelm Heidkamp. He was in charge of the pumps on the battlecruiser SMS Seydlitz during the Battle of Dogger Bank on 24 January 1915. After a British shell started a large fire in the ship's aft gun turrets, he was badly burned when he turned the valves to flood the aft magazines, thus saving the ship.

The ship was ordered from AG Weser (Deschimag) on 6 January 1936. She was laid down at Deschimag's Bremen shipyard as yard number W923 on 14 December 1937, launched on 20 August 1938, and commissioned on 20 June 1939. After working up, Z21 Wilhelm Heidkamp became the flagship of the Commander of Torpedo Boats (Führer der Torpedoboote) Rear Admiral (Konteradmiral) Günther Lütjens and patrolled the Skagerrak to inspect neutral shipping for contraband goods in late September.

On the night of 17/18 October, the ship led Z16 Friedrich Eckoldt, Z17 Diether von Roeder, Z18 Hans Lüdemann, Z19 Hermann Künne, and Z20 Karl Galster as they laid a minefield off the mouth of the River Humber. The British were unaware of the minefield's existence and lost seven ships totaling 25,825 gross register tons (GRT). On the night of 12/13 November Z21 Wilhelm Heidkamp, now the flagship of the Commander of Destroyers (Führer der Zerstörer), Captain (Kapitän zur See) Friedrich Bonte, escorted Z18 Hans Lüdemann, Z19 Hermann Künne, and Z20 Karl Galster as they laid 288 magnetic mines in the Thames Estuary. Once again unaware of the minefield's existence, the British lost the destroyer Blanche and thirteen merchant ships displacing 48,728 GRT. Less than a week later, Z21 Wilhelm Heidkamp, Z19 Hermann Künne, and Z11 Bernd von Arnim laid 180 magnetic mines in the Thames Estuary on the night of 17/18 November. The mines sank the destroyer Gipsy, a fishing trawler, and seven ships of 27,565 GRT.

After a refit in Stettin between 27 November and 24 December, Bonte and Z21 Wilhelm Heidkamp led a minelaying sortie to the Newcastle area together with Z16 Friedrich Eckoldt, Z20 Karl Galster, and Z22 Anton Schmitt on the night of 10/11 January 1940. The destroyers Z14 Friedrich Ihn and Z4 Richard Beitzen were also supposed to participate, but the former had problems with her boilers that reduced her maximum speed to 27 knots (50 km/h; 31 mph) and she had to be escorted back to Germany by the latter ship. The minefield only claimed one fishing trawler of 251 GRT.

In retaliation for the Altmark Incident where the Royal Navy seized captured British sailors from the German tanker Altmark in neutral Norwegian waters on 16 February, the Kriegsmarine organized Operation Nordmark to search for Allied merchant ships in the North Sea as far north as the Shetland Islands. Z20 Karl Galster and Z21 Wilhelm Heidkamp escorted the battleships Scharnhorst and Gneisenau as well as the heavy cruiser Admiral Hipper during the sortie between 18 February and 20 February.

=== Norwegian Campaign ===
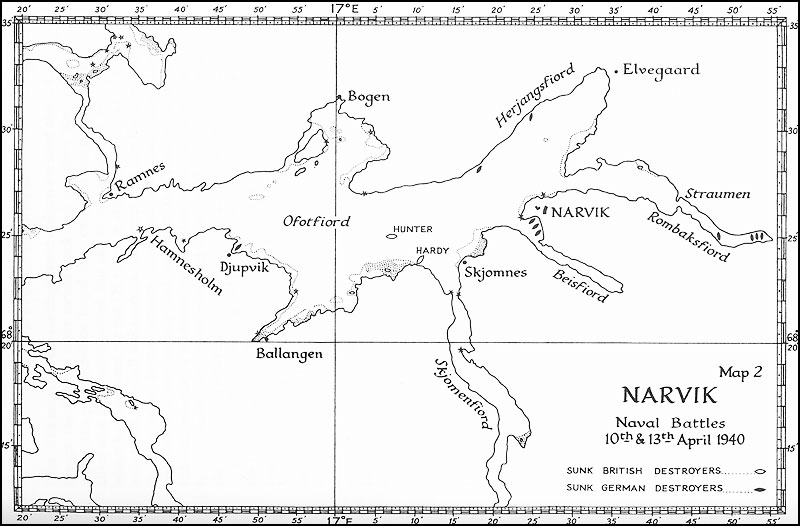
A map of the Ofotfjord

Z21 Wilhelm Heidkamp was the flagship for Group 1, commanded by Kommodore Bonte, for the Norwegian portion of Operation Weserübung in April 1940. The group's task was to transport the 139. Gebirgsjäger Regiment (139th Mountain Infantry Regiment) and the headquarters of the 3. Gebirgs-Division (3rd Mountain Division) to seize Narvik. The ships began loading troops on 6 April and set sail the next day. On 9 April, Z21 Wilhelm Heidkamp sank the old coastal defense ship Eidsvold with torpedoes after an attempt to get her captain to surrender failed. Afterwards, she landed her troops in Narvik without resistance and then refuelled from the whale factory ship SS Jan Wellem. Bonte intended for his flagship to patrol the fjord during the night, but Generalmajor Eduard Dietl, commander of the 3rd Mountain Division, requested that Z21 Wilhelm Heidkamp remain in harbor to ease coordination between the Army (Heer) and the Kriegsmarine and to facilitate communications with his commanders.

On 10 April, the ship was moored aft of Jan Wellem, in Narvik harbor, when the five destroyers of the British 2nd Destroyer Flotilla, HMS Hardy, Havock, Hunter, Hotspur, and Hero made an attack on the harbour. At 5:35 am, shortly after dawn, Hardy, Hunter, and Havock entered the harbour in line ahead firing their torpedoes in turn at the ships then using gunfire before leaving. Z21 Wilhelm Heidkamp was struck in the stern by a torpedo from Hardy's first salvo. It detonated the ship's aft magazine; the explosion threw her aft guns into the air and killed 81 men, including Bonte in his cabin. Although Z21 Wilhelm Heidkamp's stern was below water, her captain, Korvettenkapitän Hans Erdmenger, managed to moor her to a nearby Swedish freighter. She capsized the following day, but not before her torpedoes were transferred to the surviving destroyers. Her survivors joined the other survivors ashore in an ad-hoc naval infantry unit.
