= German destroyer Z19 Hermann Künne =

Type 1936-class destroyer

Coordinates: 68°31′25″N 17°25′25″E

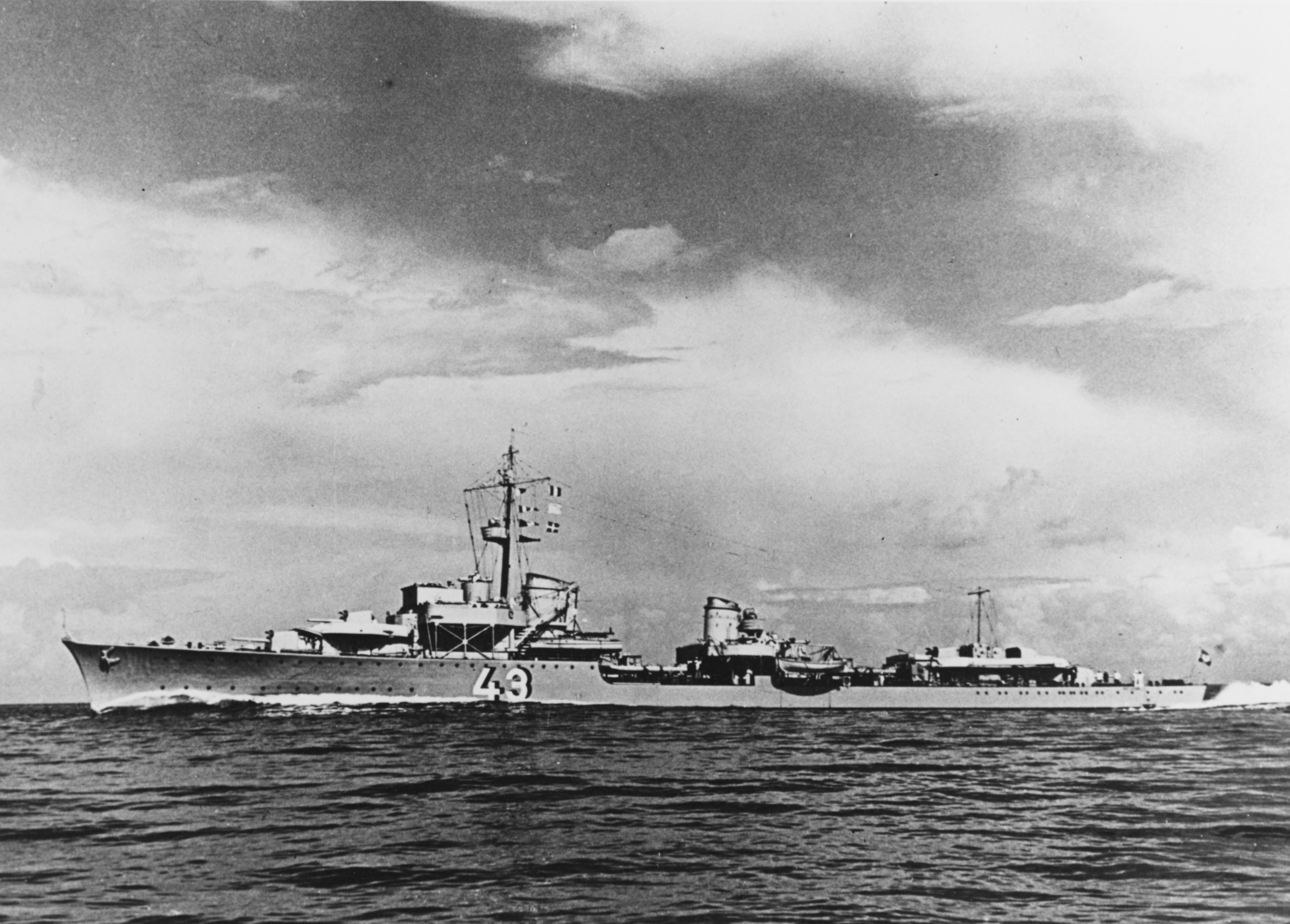
- Sister ship Z21 Wilhelm Heidkamp underway, about 1939

History

Nazi Germany
- Name: Hermann Künne
- Namesake: Hermann Künne
- Ordered: 6 January 1936
- Builder: AG Weser (Deschimag), Bremen
- Yard number: W921
- Laid down: 5 October 1936
- Launched: 22 December 1937
- Commissioned: 12 January 1939
- Fate: Scuttled, 13 April 1940

General characteristics
- Class & type: Type 1936 destroyer
- Displacement: 2,411 long tons (2,450 t) (standard); 3,415 long tons (3,470 t) (deep load)
- Length: 125.1 m (410 ft 5 in) (o/a)
- Beam: 11.8 m (38 ft 9 in)
- Draft: 4.5 m (14 ft 9 in)
- Installed power: 70,000 PS (51,000 kW; 69,000 shp); 6 × water-tube boilers
- Propulsion: 2 × shafts; 2 × geared steam turbine sets
- Speed: 36 knots (67 km/h; 41 mph)
- Range: 2,050 nmi (3,800 km; 2,360 mi) at 19 knots (35 km/h; 22 mph)
- Complement: 323
- Armament: 5 × single 12.7 cm (5 in) guns; 2 × twin 3.7 cm (1.5 in) AA guns; 6 × single 2 cm (0.79 in) AA guns; 2 × quadruple 53.3 cm (21 in) torpedo tubes; 4 × depth charge throwers; 60 mines

Z19 Hermann Künne was one of six Type 1936 destroyers built for the Kriegsmarine (German Navy) in the late 1930s. Completed at the beginning of 1939, the ship spent most of her time training although she did participate in the occupation of Memel a few months later. At the beginning of World War II in September, she was initially deployed to lay minefields off the German coast, but was soon transferred to the Skagerrak where she inspected neutral shipping for contraband goods. In late 1939, Z18 Hans Lüdemann helped to laid four offensive minefields off the English coast that claimed two British destroyers and thirty-eight merchant ships.

During the German invasion of Norway in April 1940, she was tasked to attack Narvik and participated in both the First and Second Naval Battles of Narvik. Z19 Hermann Künne was disabled during the first battle, but was repaired in time to fight in the second battle until she had exhausted her ammunition. Afterwards the ship had to be scuttled to prevent her capture.

== Design and description ==
Z19 Hermann Künne had an overall length of 125.1 meters (410 ft 5 in) and was 120 meters (393 ft 8 in) long at the waterline. The ship had a beam of 11.8 meters (38 ft 9 in), and a maximum draft of 4.5 meters (14 ft 9 in). She displaced 2,411 long tons (2,450 t) at standard load and 3,415 long tons (3,470 t) at deep load. The two Wagner geared steam turbine sets, each driving one propeller shaft, were designed to produce 70,000 PS (51,000 kW; 69,000 shp) using steam provided by six Wagner boilers for a designed speed of 36 knots (67 km/h; 41 mph). During Z19 Hermann Künne's sea trials on 21–22 March 1939, she reached 39 knots (72.2 km/h; 44.9 mph) from 72,100 PS (53,000 kW; 71,100 shp). The ship carried a maximum of 739 metric tons (727 long tons) of fuel oil which gave a range of 2,050 nautical miles (3,800 km; 2,360 mi) at 19 knots (35 km/h; 22 mph). Her crew consisted of 10 officers and 313 sailors.

The ship carried five 12.7-centimeter (5 in) SK C/34 guns in single mounts with gun shields, two each superimposed, fore and aft of the superstructure. The fifth mount was positioned on top of the rear deckhouse. The guns were numbered from 1 to 5 from front to rear. Her anti-aircraft armament consisted of four 3.7-centimeter (1.5 in) SK C/30 guns in two twin mounts abreast the rear funnel and six 2-centimeter (0.8 in) C/30 guns in single mounts. The ship carried eight above-water 53.3-centimeter (21.0 in) torpedo tubes in two power-operated mounts. Two reloads were provided for each mount. She had four depth charge launchers and mine rails could be fitted on the rear deck that had a maximum capacity of 60 mines. 'GHG' (Gruppenhorchgerät) passive hydrophones were fitted to detect submarines and an active sonar system was installed by the end of 1939.

== Name, construction and career ==
Z19 Hermann Künne was named after a sailor from the torpedo boat S-53 who was killed in hand-to-hand combat on the mole of Zeebrugge during the Zeebrugge Raid on 23 April 1918.

The ship was ordered from AG Weser (Deschimag) on 6 January 1936. She was laid down at Deschimag's Bremen shipyard as yard number W921 on 5 October, launched on 22 December 1937, and commissioned on 12 January 1939. From 23 to 24 March, the ship was one of the destroyers that escorted Adolf Hitler aboard the heavy cruiser Deutschland to occupy Memel. On 30 June, Z19 Hermann Künne and her sister Z18 Hans Lüdemann were making port visits in Norway when the former accidentally rammed the pier at Moldefjord after her rudder failed. She returned to Swinemünde on 20 July and participated in torpedo training the following month.

When World War II began in September, Z19 Hermann Künne was initially deployed in the German Bight where she laid defensive minefields. The ship then patrolled the Skagerrak to inspect neutral shipping for contraband goods. On the night of 17/18 October, Rear Admiral (Konteradmiral) Günther Lütjens, aboard his flagship Z21 Wilhelm Heidkamp, led Z16 Friedrich Eckoldt, Z17 Diether von Roeder, Z18 Hans Lüdemann, Z19 Hermann Künne, and Z20 Karl Galster as they laid a minefield off the mouth of the River Humber. The British were unaware of the minefield's existence and lost seven ships totaling 25,825 gross register tons (GRT). Missions on the nights of 8/9 and 10/11 November had to be aborted because of seawater contamination in Z19 Hermann Künne's fuel. On the night of 12/13 November Z21 Wilhelm Heidkamp, now the flagship of the Commander of Destroyers (Führer der Zerstörer), Kapitän zur See (Captain) Friedrich Bonte, escorted Z18 Hans Lüdemann, Z19 Hermann Künne, and Z20 Karl Galster as they laid 288 magnetic mines in the Thames estuary. Once again unaware of the minefield's existence, the British lost the destroyer Blanche and thirteen merchant ships of 48,728 GRT.

Less than a week later, Z21 Wilhelm Heidkamp, Z19 Hermann Künne, and Z11 Bernd von Arnim laid 180 magnetic mines in the Thames Estuary on the night of 17/18 November. The mines sank the destroyer Gipsy, a fishing trawler, and seven ships of 27,565 GRT. On the night of 12/13 December, German destroyers sortied to lay minefields off the British coast. Under the command of Commodore (Kommodore) Bonte in his flagship Z19 Hermann Künne, Z4 Richard Beitzen, Z8 Bruno Heinemann, Z14 Friedrich Ihn and Z15 Erich Steinbrinck laid 240 mines off the mouth of the River Tyne, where the navigation lights were still lit. The British lost eleven ships totaling 18,979 GRT. En route home, the destroyers were ordered to escort the crippled light cruisers Leipzig and Nürnberg which had been torpedoed by the submarine HMS Salmon while covering the destroyers' withdrawal. Z19 Hermann Künne was scheduled for another minelaying mission on 17 December, but boiler contamination prevented her participation and she was refitting in Stettin until 14 March 1940

=== Norwegian Campaign ===
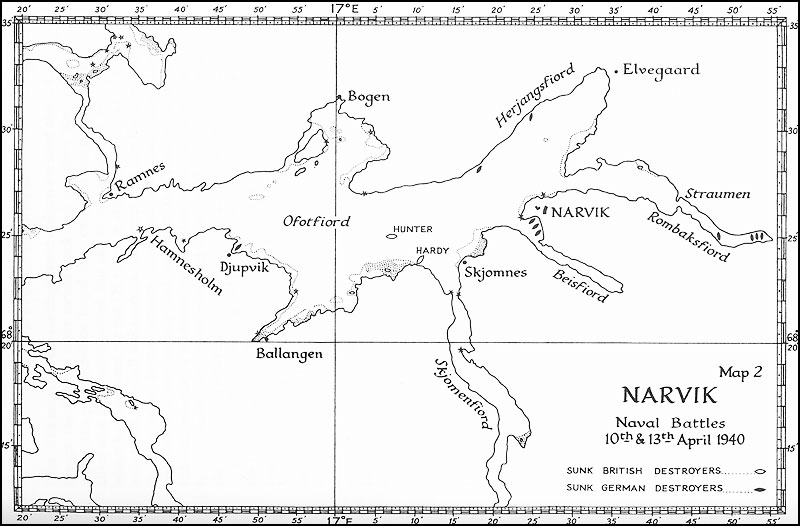
A map of the Ofotfjord

Z19 Hermann Künne was allocated to Group 1 for the Norwegian portion of Operation Weserübung in April 1940. The group's task was to transport the 139th Mountain Infantry Regiment (139. Gebirgsjäger Regiment) and the headquarters of the 3rd Mountain Division (3. Gebirgs-Division) to seize Narvik. The ships began loading troops on 6 April and set sail the next day. When they arrived off the Ofotfjord on the morning of 9 April, Z19 Hermann Künne landed her troops at the head of the Herjangsfjord and helped to capture the Norwegian Army barracks at Elvegårdsmoen. Later that day she briefly refuelled from the whale factory ship SS Jan Wellem and then stood picket duty until midnight when she returned to Jan Wellem to top off her fuel tanks.

Shortly after dawn on 10 April, the ship was still tied up to Jan Wellem when the five destroyers of the British 2nd Destroyer Flotilla, Hardy, Havock, Hunter, Hotspur, and Hero appeared. Hardy, Hunter and Havock made the first attack on Narvik harbor while the other two acted as rearguards. Z19 Hermann Künne exchanged fire with Hunter to no effect while preparing to back away from the whaler. By the time Havock opened fire, the German ship was underway, having cast off hoses and mooring lines. When the British destroyer hit and sank Z22 Anton Schmitt with a torpedo, Z19 Hermann Künne was only 40 meters (44 yd) away and the shock from the detonation knocked out her turbines. Without power, the ship drifted into the wreck and became entangled with it. Some of her crew panicked and jumped overboard, but only a few were rescued. After about an hour, she was able to restore power and disentangle herself from Z22 Anton Schmitt's wreck. Z19 Hermann Künne had suffered from splinter damage that killed nine crewmen. Later that afternoon she sailed to the wreck of Hardy where it had run aground and searched it.

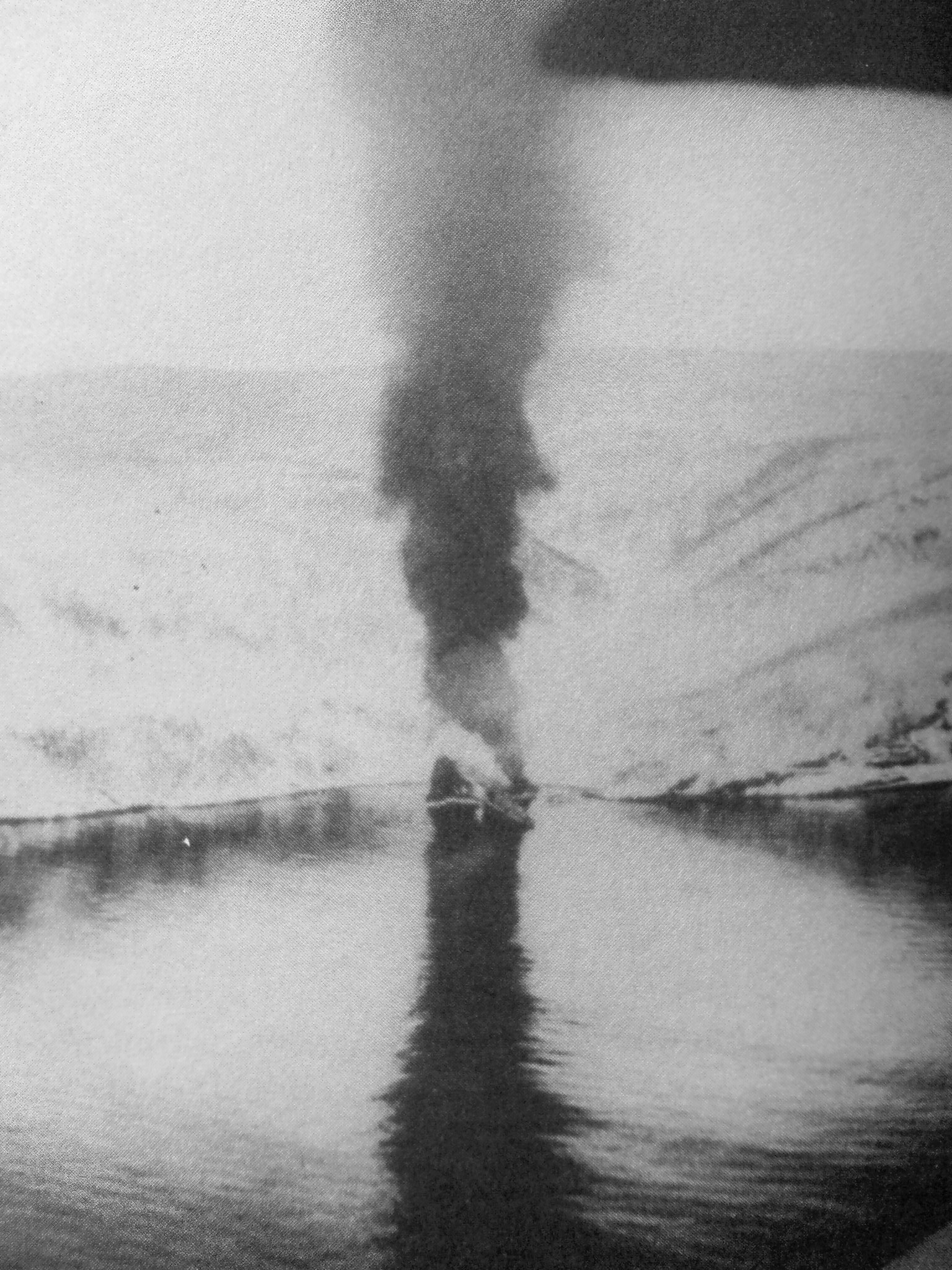
Z19 Hermann Künne burning on 13 April 1940

On the night of 12/13 April, Commander (Fregattenkapitän) Erich Bey, the senior surviving German officer, received word to expect an attack the following day by British capital ships escorted by a large number of destroyers and supported by carrier aircraft. The battleship Warspite and nine destroyers duly appeared on 13 April, although earlier than Bey had expected, and caught the Germans out of position. Z19 Hermann Künne, leading Z13 Erich Koellner westwards to take up her position flanking the entrance to the fjord, was the first ship to spot the approaching British ships and alerted Bey. The other operable destroyers joined Z19 Hermann Künne as she fell back and engaged the British ships at long range from behind a smoke screen. Nine Fairey Swordfish torpedo bombers attacked the German destroyers, near-missing Z19 Hermann Künne and another ship, but lost two aircraft shot down during the attack. By the early afternoon, the Germans had exhausted most of their ammunition and Bey ordered his ships to retreat to the Rombaksfjorden (the easternmost branch of the Ofotfjord), east of Narvik, where they might attempt to ambush any pursuing British destroyers. Lieutenant Commander (Korvettenkapitän) Friedrich Kothe, captain of the ship, misunderstood the signal and headed north into the Herjangsfjord where he run the ship aground in Trollvika near Bjerkvik. She had fired off all of her ammunition, including practice and star shells; her depth charges were rigged for demolition and they were set off once the crew had abandoned ship. The destroyers Eskimo and Forester followed the German ship into the Herjangsfjord and the former put a torpedo into the wreck for good measure, breaking off her stern.

=== The wreck ===
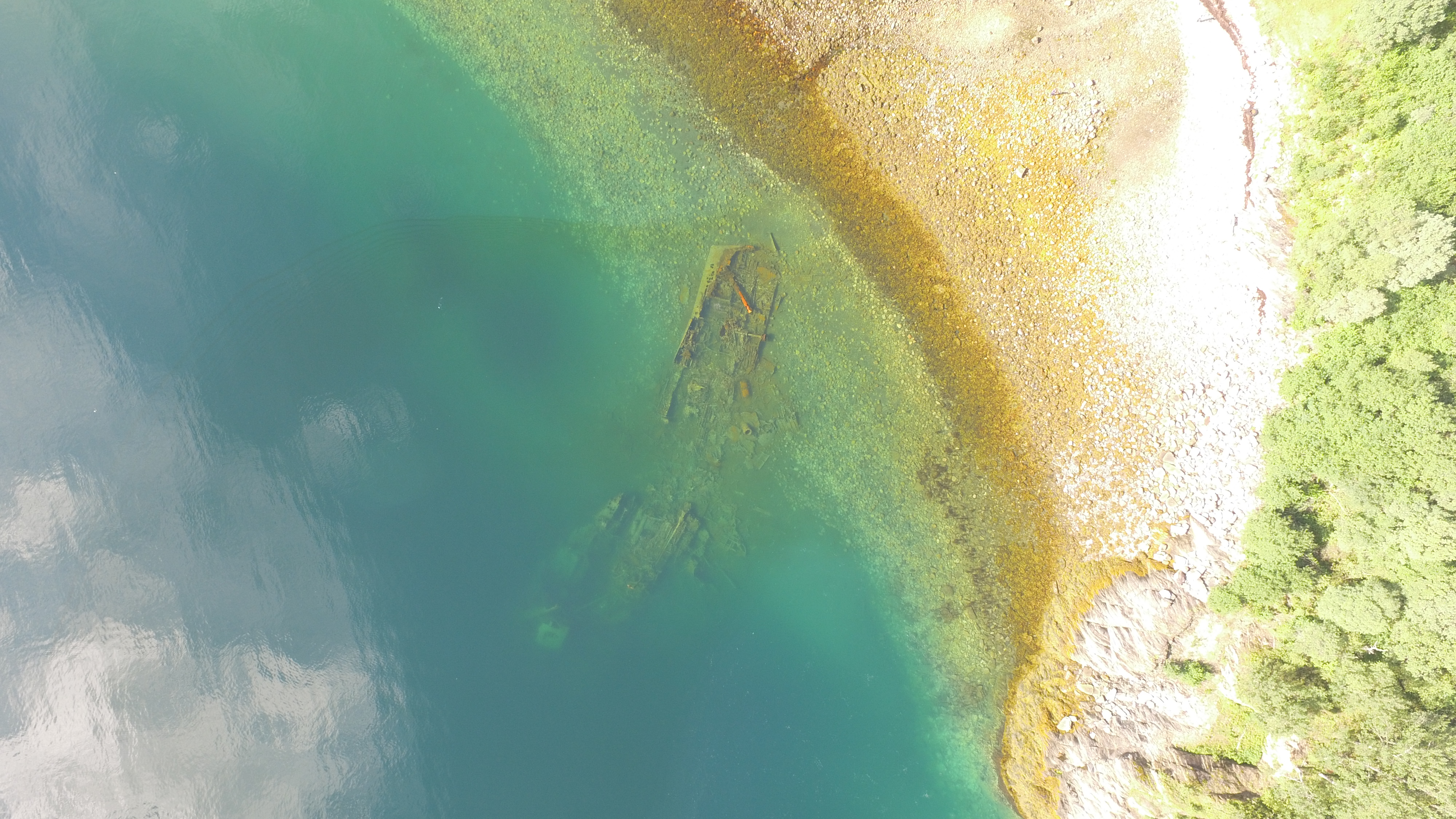
The remains of Z19 Hermann Künne in 2018

The ship was partially scrapped and the remains further demolished after World War II. It rests on its starboard side between 0 m (0 ft) and 37 m (121 ft) depth. In a 1999 survey, the wreck was found to contain no remaining oil. The wreck location is relatively easy to access, and wreck diving is permitted.
