= Wilhelm Heidkamp =

German sailor (1883–1931)

- Born: 20 January 1883; Hergenrath, Kingdom of Prussia, German Empire (modern-day Belgium)
- Died: 5 October 1931 (aged 48); Untereschbach, Germany
- Military career
- Allegiance: German Empire; Weimar Republic
- Branch: Kaiserliche Marine; Reichsmarine
- Service years: 1902-1920
- Rank: Pumpenmeister
- Conflicts: World War I; Battle of the Dogger Bank (WIA); Battle of Jutland; Scuttling of the German fleet at Scapa Flow (POW)

Pumpenmeister (mil. rank: Maat) Wilhelm Heidkamp (20 January 1883 – 5 October 1931) was a German sailor who fought in World War I.

== Biography ==
Heidkamp was born in Herkenrath and joined the Imperial German Navy as a machinist in 1902. He was transferred to SMS Seydlitz in 1912.

He was a Petty Officer (equiv) on Seydlitz during the Battle of the Dogger Bank in January 1915. During the battle, the ship was hit by gunfire from HMS Lion that knocked out both rear turrets and caused a serious propellant fire. Heidkamp prevented his ship from exploding by flooding the magazines. He turned the valves even though they were glowing red-hot. During this action his hands and lungs were severely injured, and he would die of consequent lung disease in 1931.

After his recovery, Heidkamp continued to serve on Seydlitz until its scuttling in Scapa Flow on 21 June 1919. Thereafter, Heidkamp became a prisoner of war, from which he returned to Germany in 1920. After the war Heidkamp took over his father's grocery store in Untereschbach. Heidkamp was married and had four children.

The German Type 1936 destroyer Z21 Wilhelm Heidkamp was named in his honour. A street in Immekeppel is also named after him.

== See also ==
- Francis Harvey
- Aldar Tsydenzhapov
