= German destroyer Z22 Anton Schmitt =

Type 1936-class destroyer

Coordinates: 68°25′N 17°24′E

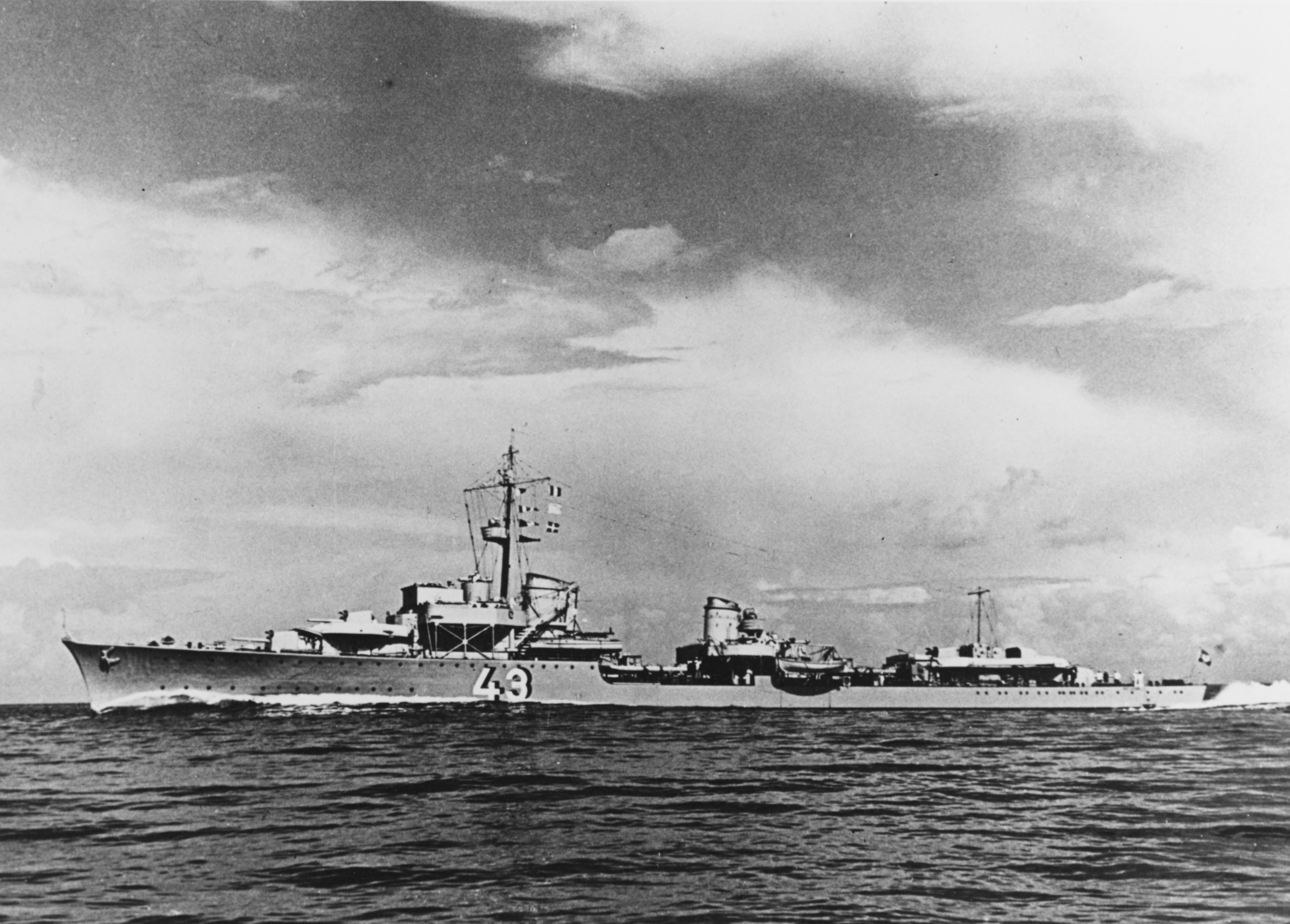
- Sister ship Z21 Wilhelm Heidkamp underway, c. 1939

History

Nazi Germany
- Name: Z22 Anton Schmitt
- Namesake: Anton Schmitt
- Ordered: 6 January 1936
- Builder: AG Weser (Deschimag), Bremen
- Yard number: 924
- Laid down: 3 January 1938
- Launched: 20 September 1938
- Commissioned: 24 September 1939
- Fate: Sunk in the First Battle of Narvik, 10 April 1940

General characteristics
- Class & type: Type 1936 destroyer
- Displacement: 2,411 long tons (2,450 t) (standard); 3,415 long tons (3,470 t) (deep load)
- Length: 125.1 m (410 ft 5 in) (o/a)
- Beam: 11.8 m (38 ft 9 in)
- Draft: 4.5 m (14 ft 9 in)
- Installed power: 6 × water-tube boilers; 70,000 PS (51,000 kW; 69,000 shp)
- Propulsion: 2 × shafts; 2 × geared steam turbine sets
- Speed: 36 knots (67 km/h; 41 mph)
- Range: 2,050 nmi (3,800 km; 2,360 mi) at 19 knots (35 km/h; 22 mph)
- Complement: 323
- Armament: 5 × single 12.7 cm (5 in) guns; 2 × twin 3.7 cm (1.5 in) AA guns; 6 × single 2 cm (0.79 in) AA guns; 2 × quadruple 53.3 cm (21 in) torpedo tubes; 4 × depth charge throwers; 60 mines

Z22 Anton Schmitt was one of six Type 1936 destroyers built for the Kriegsmarine (German Navy) in the late 1930s. Completed after the beginning of World War II in September 1939, she helped to lay an offensive minefield off the English coast that claimed one small ship. During the German invasion of Norway in April 1940, the ship was tasked to attack Narvik and was sunk during the First Naval Battle of Narvik on 10 April.

== Design and description ==
Z22 Anton Schmitt had an overall length of 125.1 meters (410 ft 5 in) and was 120 meters (393 ft 8 in) long at the waterline. The ship had a beam of 11.8 meters (38 ft 9 in), and a maximum draft of 4.5 meters (14 ft 9 in). She displaced 2,411 long tons (2,450 t) at standard load and 3,415 long tons (3,470 t) at deep load. The two Wagner geared steam turbine sets, each driving one propeller shaft, were designed to produce 70,000 PS (51,000 kW; 69,000 shp) using steam provided by six Wagner boilers for a designed speed of 36 knots (67 km/h; 41 mph). During Z22 Anton Schmitt's sea trials on 7–11 November 1939, she reached 36.9 knots (68.3 km/h; 42.5 mph) from 69,000 PS (51,000 kW; 68,000 shp), but full-speed trials were never conducted. The ship carried a maximum of 739 metric tons (727 long tons) of fuel oil which gave a range of 2,050 nautical miles (3,800 km; 2,360 mi) at 19 knots (35 km/h; 22 mph). Her crew consisted of 10 officers and 313 sailors.

The ship carried five 12.7-centimeter (5.0 in) SK C/34 guns in single mounts with gun shields, two each superimposed, fore and aft of the superstructure. The fifth mount was positioned on top of the rear deckhouse. The guns were numbered from 1 to 5 from front to rear. Her anti-aircraft armament consisted of four 3.7-centimeter (1.5 in) SK C/30 guns in two twin mounts abreast the rear funnel and six 2-centimeter (0.79 in) C/30 guns in single mounts. The ship carried eight above-water 53.3-centimeter (21.0 in) torpedo tubes in two power-operated mounts. Two reloads were provided for each mount. She had four depth charge launchers and mine rails could be fitted on the rear deck that had a maximum capacity of 60 mines. 'GHG' (Gruppenhorchgerät) passive hydrophones were fitted to detect submarines and an active sonar system was installed by the end of 1939.

== Construction and career ==
Z22 Anton Schmitt was named after Bosun's Mate (Bootsmannsmaat) Anton Schmitt, who was the last man at the last operating gun of the sinking light cruiser Frauenlob during the Battle of Jutland on 31 May 1916 and went down with his ship. The ship was ordered from AG Weser (Deschimag) on 6 January 1936. She was laid down at Deschimag's Bremen shipyard as yard number W924 on 3 January 1938, launched on 20 September, and commissioned on 24 September 1939. After working up, Z22 Anton Schmitt helped to lay a minefield near the Newcastle area together with Z21 Wilhelm Heidkamp, Z16 Friedrich Eckoldt, and Z20 Karl Galster on the night of 10/11 January 1940. The destroyers Z14 Friedrich Ihn and Z4 Richard Beitzen were also supposed to participate, but the former had problems with her boilers that reduced her maximum speed to 27 knots (50 km/h; 31 mph) and she had to be escorted back to Germany by the latter ship. The minefield only claimed one fishing trawler of 251 gross register tons (GRT).

=== Norwegian Campaign ===
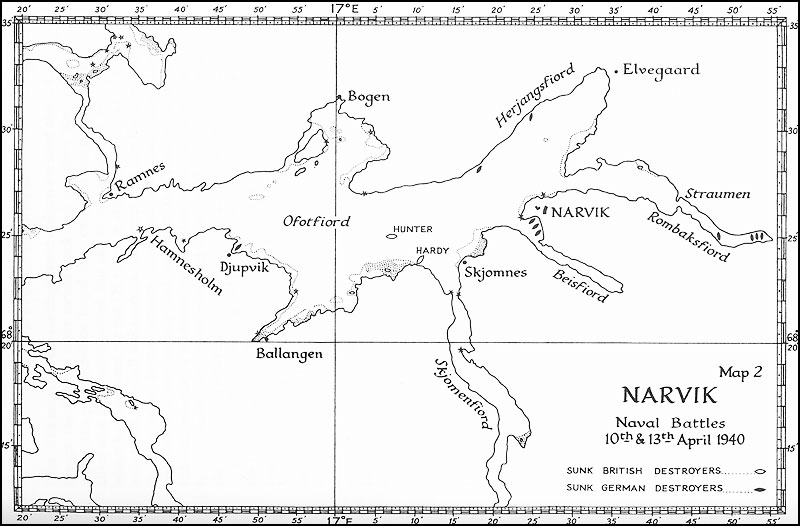
A map of the Ofotfjord

Z22 Anton Schmitt was allocated to Group 1 for the Norwegian portion of Operation Weserübung in April 1940. The group's task was to transport the 139th Mountain Infantry Regiment (139. Gebirgsjäger Regiment) and the headquarters of the 3rd Mountain Division (3. Gebirgs-Division) to seize Narvik. The ships began loading troops on 6 April and set sail the next day. When they arrived off the Ofotfjord on the morning of 9 April, Z22 Anton Schmitt and her sister Z18 Hans Lüdemann landed their troops at the Ramnes narrows to search for the coastal artillery positions that the Germans mistakenly believed to command the mouth of the fjord. Z17 Diether von Roeder remained offshore to provide support if necessary and to serve as a picket ship in case the British intended to interfere with the operation. About 11:00 the troops were ordered to reboard their destroyers which proceeded to Narvik. Z22 Anton Schmitt had picket duty the following night and then sailed into Narvik harbor.

Shortly after dawn on 10 April, the five destroyers of the British 2nd Destroyer Flotilla, Hardy, Havock, Hunter, Hotspur, and Hostile appeared, totally surprising the Germans. Hunter hit Z22 Anton Schmitt with a single 4.7-inch (120 mm) shell and with a torpedo in the forward engine room. And then Havock hit the listing ship with another torpedo that broke her in half, killing or wounding over 50 crewmen. The survivors joined the other survivors ashore in an ad-hoc naval infantry unit.
