= German destroyer Z18 Hans Lüdemann =

Type 1936-class destroyer

Coordinates: 68°25′N 17°54′E

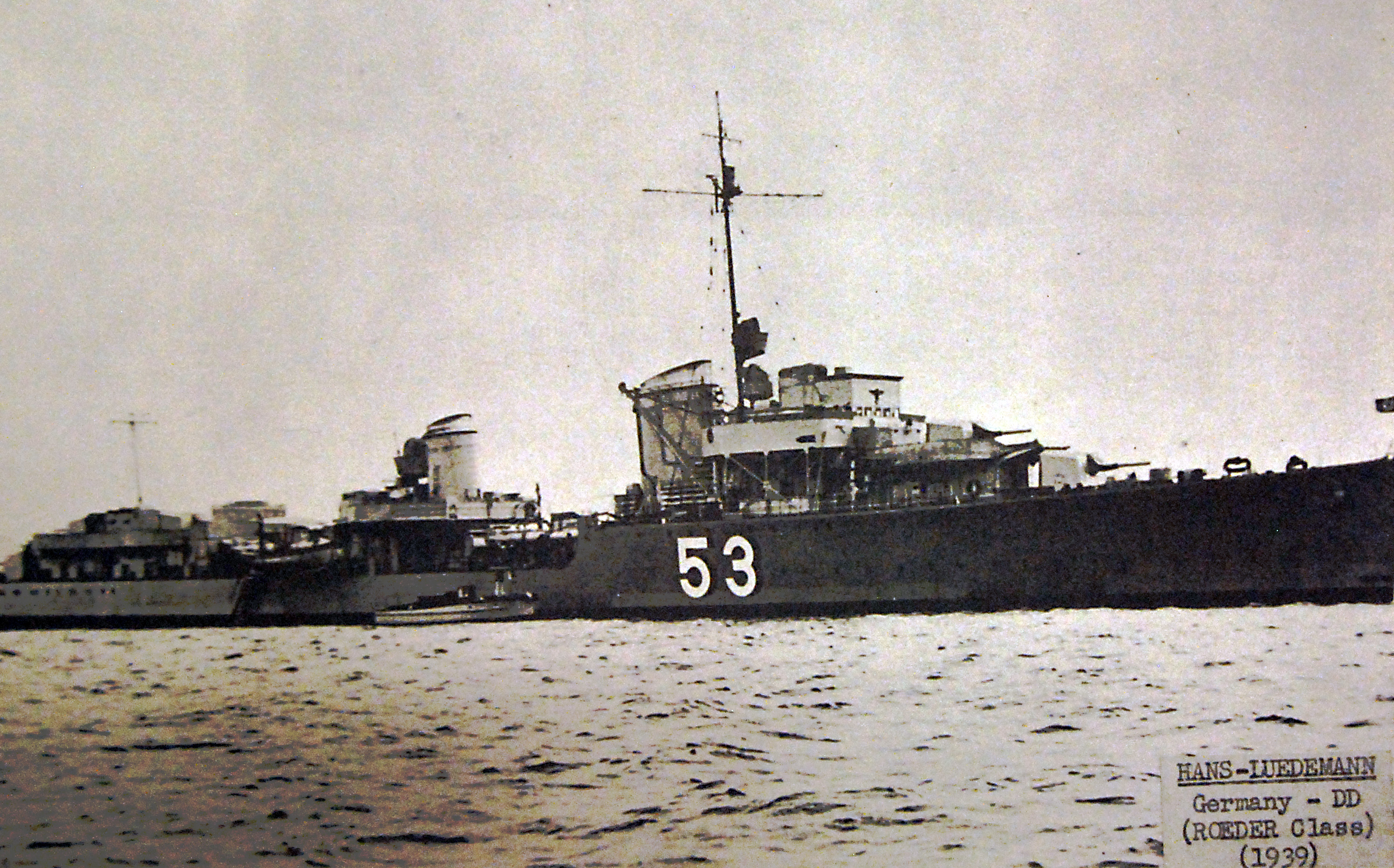
- Z18 Hans Lüdemann in 1939

History

Nazi Germany
- Name: Z18 Hans Lüdemann
- Namesake: Hans Lüdemann
- Ordered: 6 January 1936
- Builder: AG Weser (Deschimag), Bremen
- Yard number: W920
- Laid down: 9 September 1936
- Launched: 1 December 1937
- Completed: 8 October 1938
- Fate: Scuttled, 13 April 1940

General characteristics
- Class & type: Type 1936 destroyer
- Displacement: 2,411 long tons (2,450 t) (standard); 3,415 long tons (3,470 t) (deep load)
- Length: 123.4 m (404 ft 10 in) (o/a)
- Beam: 11.8 m (38 ft 9 in)
- Draft: 4.5 m (14 ft 9 in)
- Installed power: 70,000 PS (51,000 kW; 69,000 shp); 6 × water-tube boilers
- Propulsion: 2 × shafts; 2 × geared steam turbine sets
- Speed: 36 knots (67 km/h; 41 mph)
- Range: 2,050 nmi (3,800 km; 2,360 mi) at 19 knots (35 km/h; 22 mph)
- Complement: 323
- Armament: 5 × single 12.7 cm (5 in) guns; 2 × twin 3.7 cm (1.5 in) AA guns; 6 × single 2 cm (0.79 in) AA guns; 2 × quadruple 53.3 cm (21 in) torpedo tubes; 4 × depth charge throwers; 60 mines

Z18 Hans Lüdemann was one of six Type 1936 destroyers built for the Kriegsmarine (German Navy) in the late 1930s. Completed in 1938, the ship spent most of her time training. At the beginning of World War II in September 1939, she was initially deployed to lay minefields off the German coast, but was soon transferred to the Skagerrak where she inspected neutral shipping for contraband goods. In late 1939, Z18 Hans Lüdemann helped to lay two offensive minefields off the English coast that claimed one destroyer and twenty merchant ships.

During the German invasion of Norway in April 1940, Z17 Diether von Roeder was tasked to attack Narvik and participated in both the First and Second Naval Battles of Narvik. She was damaged by British destroyers during the first battle and was one of the last surviving German destroyers during the second battle. After the British knocked out all of her guns, the ship was run ashore to allow the crew to abandon ship. They attempted to scuttle Z18 Hans Lüdemann with explosives to prevent her capture, however, the scuttling charges failed and the British were able to board her. A British destroyer torpedoed her wreck to prevent any repairs.

== Design and description ==
Z18 Hans Lüdemann had an overall length of 123.4 meters (404 ft 10 in) and was 120 meters (393 ft 8 in) long at the waterline. The ship had a beam of 11.8 meters (38 ft 9 in), and a maximum draft of 4.5 meters (14 ft 9 in). She displaced 2,411 long tons (2,450 t) at standard load and 3,415 long tons (3,470 t) at deep load. The two Wagner geared steam turbine sets, each driving one propeller shaft, were designed to produce 70,000 PS (51,000 kW; 69,000 shp) using steam provided by six Wagner water-tube boilers for a designed speed of 36 knots (67 km/h; 41 mph). During Z18 Hans Lüdemann's sea trials on 9 January 1940, she reached 39.8 knots (73.7 km/h; 45.8 mph) from 74,500 PS (54,800 kW; 73,500 shp). The ship carried a maximum of 739 metric tons (727 long tons) of fuel oil which gave a range of 2,050 nautical miles (3,800 km; 2,360 mi) at 19 knots (35 km/h; 22 mph). Her crew consisted of 10 officers and 313 sailors.

The ship carried five 12.7-centimeter (5.0 in) SK C/34 guns in single mounts with gun shields, two each superimposed, fore and aft of the superstructure. The fifth mount was positioned on top of the rear deckhouse. The guns were numbered from 1 to 5 from front to rear. Her anti-aircraft armament consisted of four 3.7-centimeter (1.5 in) SK C/30 guns in two twin mounts abreast the rear funnel and six 2-centimeter (0.8 in) C/30 guns in single mounts. The ship carried eight above-water 53.3-centimeter (21.0 in) torpedo tubes in two power-operated mounts. Two reloads were provided for each mount. She had four depth charge launchers and mine rails could be fitted on the rear deck that had a maximum capacity of 60 mines. 'GHG' (Gruppenhorchgerät) passive hydrophones were fitted to detect submarines and an active sonar system was installed by the end of 1939.

== Service history ==
Z18 Hans Lüdemann was named after Engineer-Midshipman Hans Lüdemann who saved the lives of the remaining men in the engine room in the torpedo boat S-13 after the high-pressure cylinder exploded on 14 May 1913. The ship was ordered from AG Weser (Deschimag) on 6 January 1936. She was laid down at Deschimag's Bremen shipyard as yard number W920 on 9 September, launched on 1 December 1937, and commissioned on 8 October 1938. In July 1939, Z18 Hans Lüdemann joined her sisters Z17 Diether von Roeder and Z19 Hermann Künne making port visits in Norway.

When World War II began in September, she was initially deployed in the German Bight where she laid defensive minefields. The ship then patrolled the Skagerrak to inspect neutral shipping for contraband goods. On the night of 17/18 October, Rear Admiral (Konteradmiral) Günther Lütjens, aboard his flagship Z21 Wilhelm Heidkamp, led Z16 Friedrich Eckoldt, Z17 Diether von Roeder, Z18 Hans Lüdemann, Z19 Hermann Künne, and Z20 Karl Galster as they laid a minefield off the mouth of the River Humber. The British were unaware of the minefield's existence and lost seven ships totaling 25,825 gross register tons (GRT). On the night of 12/13 November Z21 Wilhelm Heidkamp, now the flagship of the Commander of Destroyers (Führer der Zerstörer), Kapitän zur See (Captain) Friedrich Bonte, escorted Z18 Hans Lüdemann, Z19 Hermann Künne, and Z20 Karl Galster as they laid 288 magnetic mines in the Thames estuary. Once again unaware of the minefield's existence, the British lost the destroyer Blanche and thirteen merchant ships displacing 48,728 GRT. On 1 December she began a refit at Stettin that lasted for three months.

=== Norwegian Campaign ===
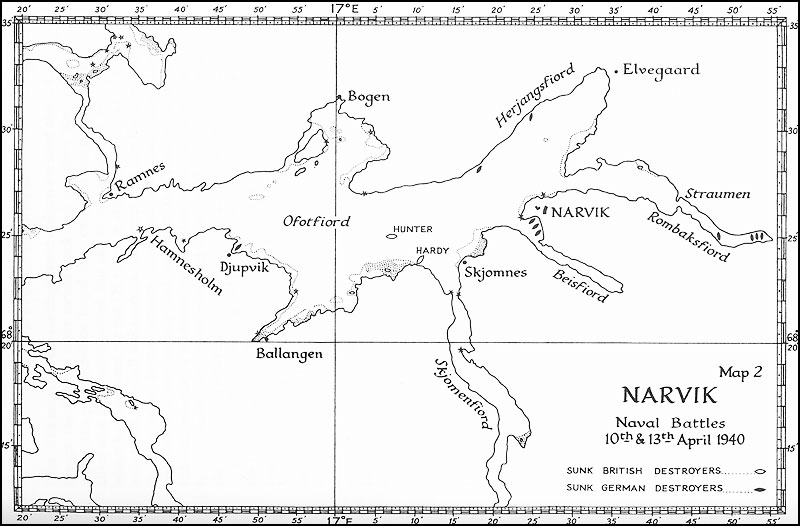
A map of the Ofotfjord

Z18 Hans Lüdemann was allocated to Group 1 for the Norwegian portion of Operation Weserübung in April 1940. The group's task was to transport the 139th Mountain Infantry Regiment (139. Gebirgsjäger Regiment) and the headquarters of the 3rd Mountain Division (3. Gebirgs-Division) to seize Narvik. The ships began loading troops on 6 April and set sail the next day. When they arrived off the Ofotfjord on the morning of 9 April, Z18 Hans Lüdemann and Z22 Anton Schmitt landed their troops at the Ramnes narrows to search for the coastal artillery positions that the Germans mistakenly believed to command the mouth of the fjord. Z17 Diether von Roeder remained offshore to provide support if necessary and to serve as a picket ship in case the British intended to interfere with the operation. About 11:00 the troops were ordered to reboard their destroyers which proceeded to Narvik. Shortly after midnight, Z18 Hans Lüdemann was ordered to start fuelling from the whale factory ship SS Jan Wellem.

Shortly after dawn on 10 April, the ship was still tied up to Jan Wellem when the five destroyers of the British 2nd Destroyer Flotilla, Hardy, Havock, Hunter, Hotspur, and Hero appeared. As soon as the German destroyer maneuvered clear of the tanker, she fired at Havock, without scoring any hits in the dark and snow. The British ship returned fire, disabling one of Z18 Hans Lüdemann's forward guns, severing the rudder controls, and started a fire that caused one of the magazines to be flooded. At 05:15 the ship radioed to the other destroyers anchored in the Herjangsfjord and near Ballangen. Fifteen minutes later, the British decided to attack Narvik again and her crew had managed to make some repairs in the meantime. The ship fired four torpedoes at the attacking British ship, but missed with all of them, possibly because their depth controls were set too deep. She hit Hostile once with a 12.7 cm shell during the second attack, but inflicted only minor damage. Z18 Hans Lüdemann completed temporary repairs and was operational by 11 April.

On the night of 12/13 April, Commander (Fregattenkapitän) Erich Bey, the senior surviving German officer, received word to expect an attack the following day by British capital ships escorted by a large number of destroyers and supported by carrier aircraft. The battleship Warspite and nine destroyers duly appeared on 13 April, although earlier than Bey had expected, and caught the Germans out of position. Z19 Hermann Künne, leading Z13 Erich Koellner westwards to take up her position flanking the entrance to the fjord, was the first ship to spot the approaching British ships and alerted Bey. The five operable destroyers, including Z18 Hans Lüdemann, charged out of Narvik harbor and engaged the British ships at long range from behind a smoke screen. Although no hits were scored, they did inflict splinter damage on several of the destroyers. Lack of ammunition forced the German ships to retreat to the Rombaksfjorden (the easternmost branch of the Ofotfjord), east of Narvik, where they might attempt to ambush any pursuing British destroyers.

Z18 Hans Lüdemann still had some ammunition and torpedoes left and took up position at the Straumen narrows with Z2 Georg Thiele to give the two remaining destroyers time to scuttle themselves at the head of the fjord. The pursuing British destroyers initially engaged Z18 Hans Lüdemann, which had opened fire at a range of about 3 miles (4,800 m) to little effect. Her four remaining torpedoes were fired blindly, one of which was observed to pass under Forester, and all missed. Shortly afterwards Eskimo hit the German destroyer twice, destroying No. 4 and No. 5 guns and damaging No. 3 gun, the only ones that could bear on the British ships. Lieutenant Commander (Korvettenkapitän) Herbert Friedrichs, captain of the ship, decided to withdraw as she could no longer fight the British ships and beached the ship at the head of the fjord. He ordered her rigged for demolition and abandoned ship while Z2 Georg Thiele continued to fight. Several hours later, after the latter ship was destroyed, the destroyers Hero and Icarus approached and found Z18 Hans Lüdemann still intact, the demolition charges having failed. The former sent a boarding party aboard, but they found nothing but souvenirs and Hero, following her orders to destroy all of the German destroyers, torpedoed her wreck.
