= German destroyer Z20 Karl Galster =

Type 1936-class destroyer

- Drawing of Z20 Karl Galster as of 1945

History

Nazi Germany
- Name: Karl Galster
- Namesake: Karl Galster
- Ordered: 6 January 1936
- Builder: AG Weser (Deschimag), Bremen
- Yard number: W922
- Laid down: 14 September 1936
- Launched: 15 June 1937
- Completed: 21 March 1939
- Fate: Allocated to the Soviet Union as a war prize

History

Soviet Union
- Name: Prochnyy
- Acquired: 6 February 1946
- Renamed: PKZ 99, 28 November 1954
- Reclassified: As a training ship, 1950; As an accommodation ship, 28 November 1954
- Fate: Scrapped, 1958

General characteristics (as built)
- Class & type: Type 1936 destroyer
- Displacement: 2,411 long tons (2,450 t) (standard); 3,415 long tons (3,470 t) (deep load)
- Length: 125.1 m (410 ft 5 in) (o/a)
- Beam: 11.8 m (38 ft 9 in)
- Draft: 4.5 m (14 ft 9 in)
- Installed power: 70,000 PS (51,000 kW; 69,000 shp); 6 × water-tube boilers
- Propulsion: 2 × shafts; 2 × geared steam turbine sets
- Speed: 36 knots (67 km/h; 41 mph)
- Range: 2,050 nmi (3,800 km; 2,360 mi) at 19 knots (35 km/h; 22 mph)
- Complement: 323
- Armament: 5 × single 12.7 cm (5 in) guns; 2 × twin 3.7 cm (1.5 in) AA guns; 7 × single 2 cm (0.79 in) AA guns; 2 × quadruple 53.3 cm (21 in) torpedo tubes; 4 × depth charge throwers; 60 mines

Service record
- Commanders: Theodor von Bechtolsheim March 1939 – August 1942; Harmsen August 1942 – January 1945; Kuno Schmidt January – May 1945

Z20 Karl Galster was one of six Type 1936 destroyers built for the Kriegsmarine (German Navy) in the late 1930s. Completed in early 1939, the ship spent most of her time training. At the beginning of World War II in September, she was initially deployed to lay minefields off the German coast, but was soon transferred to the Skagerrak where she inspected neutral shipping for contraband goods. In late 1939 and early 1940, Z20 Karl Galster helped to laid three offensive minefields off the English coast that claimed one British destroyer, a fishing trawler, and twenty merchant ships. After a refit that prevented her from participating in the German invasion of Norway in April, the ship was sent to Norway for escort duties. Later that year Z20 Karl Galster was transferred to France, where she made several attacks on British shipping.

The ship returned to Germany in early 1941 for a refit and was transferred to Norway in June as part of the preparations for Operation Barbarossa, the German invasion of the Soviet Union. Z20 Karl Galster spent some time at the beginning of the campaign conducting anti-shipping patrols in Soviet waters but these were generally fruitless. She escorted a number of German convoys in the Arctic later in the year until engine problems sent her back to Germany for repairs. The ship returned to Norway in mid-1942, but was badly damaged when she ran aground in July and did not return until December. Z20 Karl Galster participated in the German attack (Operation Zitronella) on the Norwegian island of Spitzbergen, well north of the Arctic Circle, in September 1943. Plagued by engine problems, the ship was under repair from November to August 1944 and then spent the next six months on convoy escort duties in southern Norway when not laying minefields.

Around March 1945, Z20 Karl Galster was transferred to the Baltic Sea where she helped to escort convoys of refugee ships and also rescued evacuees herself in May, around the time that Germany surrendered. When the surviving German warships were divided between the Allies after the war, the ship was eventually allocated to the Soviet Union. Z20 Karl Galster was handed over in 1946 and renamed Prochnyy. The ship was converted into a training ship in 1950 and then became an accommodation ship in 1954. She was scrapped four years later.

== Design and description ==
Z20 Karl Galster had an overall length of 125.10 meters (410 ft 5 in) and was 120 meters (393 ft 8 in) long at the waterline. The ship had a beam of 11.8 meters (38 ft 9 in), and a maximum draft of 4.5 meters (14 ft 9 in). She displaced 2,411 long tons (2,450 t) at standard load and 3,415 long tons (3,470 t) at deep load. The two Wagner geared steam turbine sets, each driving one propeller shaft, were designed to produce 70,000 PS (51,000 kW; 69,000 shp) using steam provided by six Wagner boilers for a designed speed of 36 knots (67 km/h; 41 mph). During Z20 Karl Galster's sea trials on 16–May 1939, she reached 39 knots (72.2 km/h; 44.9 mph) from 76,500 PS (56,300 kW; 75,500 shp). The ship carried a maximum of 739 metric tons (727 long tons) of fuel oil which gave a range of 2,050 nautical miles (3,800 km; 2,360 mi) at 19 knots (35 km/h; 22 mph). Her crew consisted of 10 officers and 313 sailors.

The ship carried five 12.7-centimeter (5.0 in) SK C/34 guns in single mounts with gun shields, two each superimposed, fore and aft of the superstructure. The fifth mount was positioned on top of the rear deckhouse. The guns were numbered from 1 to 5 from front to rear. Her anti-aircraft armament consisted of four 3.7-centimeter (1.5 in) SK C/30 guns in two twin mounts abreast the rear funnel and six 2-centimeter (0.8 in) C/30 guns in single mounts. The ship carried eight above-water 53.3-centimeter (21.0 in) torpedo tubes in two power-operated mounts. Two reloads were provided for each mount. She had four depth charge launchers and mine rails could be fitted on the rear deck that had a maximum capacity of 60 mines. 'GHG' (Gruppenhorchgerät) passive hydrophones were fitted to detect submarines and an active sonar system was installed by the end of 1939.

=== Modifications ===
In 1942, the ship had a FuMO 24/25 radar installed above the bridge as well as two FuMO 63 Hohentwiel radars, one of which replaced the aft searchlight. A FuMB 1 Metox radar detector was also installed that year. The details of the changes made to her anti-aircraft suite are not well documented, but photographic evidence shows that a quadruple 2 cm mount had been added by early 1944. Before the end of the war, the ship had her midships 2 cm guns replaced by a pair of 3.7 cm Flak M42 gun in single mounts and that four twin 2 cm mounts had probably been added in the forward superstructure.

== Construction and career ==
Z20 Karl Galster was named after Kapitänleutnant (Lieutenant) Karl Galster who commanded the torpedo boat S22 and was killed in action on 21 March 1916. The ship was ordered from AG Weser (Deschimag) on 6 January 1936. She was laid down at Deschimag's Bremen shipyard as yard number W922 on 14 September 1937, launched on 15 June 1938, and commissioned on 21 March 1939. She visited Åndalsnes, Norway, in July and then participated in a torpedo training exercise the following month.

When World War II began in September, Z20 Karl Galster was initially deployed in the German Bight where she laid defensive minefields. The ship then patrolled the Skagerrak to inspect neutral shipping for contraband goods. On the night of 17/18 October, Konteradmiral (Rear Admiral) Günther Lütjens, aboard his flagship Z21 Wilhelm Heidkamp, led Z16 Friedrich Eckoldt, Z17 Diether von Roeder, Z18 Hans Lüdemann, Z19 Hermann Künne, and Z20 Karl Galster as they laid a minefield off the mouth of the River Humber. The British were unaware of the minefield's existence and lost seven ships totaling 25,825 gross register tons (GRT). Missions on the nights of 8/9 and 10/11 November had to be aborted because of seawater contamination in Z19 Hermann Künne's fuel. On the night of 12/13 November Z21 Wilhelm Heidkamp, now the flagship of the Führer der Zerstörer (FdZ) (Commander of Destroyers), Kapitän zur See (KzS) (Captain) Friedrich Bonte, escorted Z18 Hans Lüdemann, Z19 Hermann Künne, and Z20 Karl Galster as they laid 288 magnetic mines in the Thames estuary. Once again unaware of the minefield's existence, the British lost the destroyer Blanche and thirteen merchant ships of 48,728 GRT. The ship spent the rest of the year patrolling in the German Bight.

Bonte and Z21 Wilhelm Heidkamp led a minelaying sortie to the Newcastle area together with Z16 Friedrich Eckoldt, Z20 Karl Galster, and Z22 Anton Schmitt on the night of 10/11 January 1940. The destroyers Z14 Friedrich Ihn and Z4 Richard Beitzen were also supposed to participate, but the former had problems with her boilers that reduced her maximum speed to 27 knots (50 km/h; 31 mph) and she had to be escorted back to Germany by the latter ship. The minefield only claimed one fishing trawler of 251 GRT.

In retaliation for the Altmark Incident where the Royal Navy seized captured British sailors from the German tanker Altmark in neutral Norwegian waters on 16 February, the Kriegsmarine organized Operation Nordmark to search for Allied merchant ships in the North Sea as far north as the Shetland Islands. Z20 Karl Galster and Z21 Wilhelm Heidkamp escorted the battleships Scharnhorst and Gneisenau as well as the heavy cruiser Admiral Hipper during the sortie on 18 February. Upon her return Z20 Karl Galster began a refit that lasted until 27 May.

After the catastrophic destroyer losses in the Battles of Narvik in April, the Kriegsmarine reorganized its surviving destroyers and Z20 Karl Galster became the flagship of the FdZ. In June the ship was tasked to lead the escort force for Scharnhorst, Gneisenau, and Admiral Hipper during Operation Juno, a planned attack on Harstad, Norway, to relieve pressure on the German garrison at Narvik. The ships sortied on 8 June and sank the troop transport Orama, the oil tanker Oil Pioneer and the minesweeping trawler Juniper en route, Z20 Karl Galster assisting in the rescue of Orama's survivors. The German commander, Admiral Wilhelm Marschall, then ordered Admiral Hipper and all four destroyers to Trondheim because of the heavy weather, where they arrived in the morning of 9 June. Z20 Karl Galster remained there until she had to help screen the crippled Gneisenau as she returned to Kiel on 25 July. After a brief refit, the ship helped to lay minefields in the North Sea between 14 August and 7 September.

Z20 Karl Galster, now the flagship of KzS Fritz Berger, commander of the 5th Destroyer Flotilla (5. Zerstörerflotille), transferred to France on 9 September in preparation for Operation Sealion, the planned invasion of Great Britain. Now based at Brest, the ship helped to lay a minefield in Falmouth Bay during the night of 28/29 September. Five ships totaling only 2,037 GRT were sunk by this minefield. Aboard his flagship Z10 Hans Lody, the Führer der Torpedoboote (Commander of Torpedo Boats), KzS Erich Bey, led Z20 Karl Galster and three other destroyers during a sortie for the Southwest Approaches on 17 October and were intercepted by a British force of two light cruisers and five destroyers. The British opened fire at extreme range and were forced to disengage in the face of long-range torpedo volleys and attacks by Luftwaffe bombers without having hit any of the German ships. On the night of 24–25 November, Z20 Karl Galster, no longer Berger's flagship, Z4 Richard Beitzen and Z10 Hans Lody sortied from Brest, bound for the Land's End area. En route they encountered some fishing ships south-west of Wolf Rock and engaged them with gunfire with little effect. The German ships then spotted a small convoy and Z20 Karl Galster sank one of the three merchantmen and damaged another. The flash from the guns alerted the five destroyers of the British 5th Destroyer Flotilla, but they could not intercept the German destroyers before dawn. Three nights later the German ships sortied again for the same area. They encountered two tugboats and a barge, but only sank one of the former and the barge, totaling 424 GRT. This time the 5th Destroyer Flotilla was able to intercept around 06:30 on 29 November. The Germans opened fire first, each destroyer firing four torpedoes, of which only two from Z10 Hans Lody hit their target, the destroyer HMS Javelin. The torpedoes hit at each end of the ship and blew off her bow and stern, but the British were able to tow her home. Z20 Karl Galster returned home on 5 December for a turbine overhaul in Wesermünde that lasted until 9 June 1941.

=== Arctic service ===
Two days later, the ship was one of the escorts for the heavy cruiser Lützow from Kiel to Norway as the latter ship attempted to break through the British blockade. Several Bristol Beaufort torpedo bombers spotted Lützow and her escorts en route and one managed to surprise the ships and torpedo the cruiser early on the morning of 13 June, forcing her to return to Germany for repairs. Z20 Karl Galster was then sent to Kirkenes, Norway, arriving on 11 July. Now a part of the 6th Destroyer Flotilla (6. Zerstörerflottille), she participated in a sortie on 12–13 July that sank two small Soviet ships at the cost of expending 80% of their ammunition. Another sortie on 22 July saw Z20 Karl Galster temporarily serve as the flagship for KzS Alfred Schulze-Hinrichs, commander of the 6. Zerstörerflottille, when his usual flagship Z10 Hans Lody had condenser problems. The destroyers sank a small survey ship and a flying boat and they were repeatedly attacked by Soviet aircraft to no effect before their return on the 24th. When the British aircraft carriers Victorious and Furious attacked Petsamo and Kirkenes on 29 July, the destroyers were far to the east and could not catch the British ships before they left the area. Z20 Karl Galster was now assigned to escort convoys between Tromsø and Kirkenes; during one of these missions, the submarine Trident sank two troop-carrying freighters, Bahia Laura and Donau II despite the destroyers. Z20 Karl Galster rescued over 500 survivors from the two ships. When Z10 Hans Lody required a refit in late September, Schulze-Hinrichs transferred his flag to Z20 Karl Galster until she had engine problems of her own and sailed for Germany on 23 November to begin a refit that lasted until 5 May 1942.

The ship, now flagship of KzS Gottfried Pönitz, commander of the 8. Zerstörerflottile (8th Destroyer Flotilla), sailed for Trondheim on 11 June. She was one of four destroyers assigned to escort the battleship Tirpitz during Operation Rösselsprung, an attack on the Russia-bound Convoy PQ 17. The ships sailed from Trondheim on 2 July for the first stage of the operation, although three of the destroyers, including Z20 Karl Galster, assigned to Tirpitz's escort ran aground in the dark and heavy fog and were forced to return to port for emergency repairs. The destroyer had damaged her port turbine and buckled the port propeller shaft. Escorted by two other destroyers, Z20 Karl Galster sailed for Kiel on 12 July, steaming only on one turbine. Permanent repairs were finished by mid-November, but the ship was working up until 8 December when she was one of the escorts for Lützow's voyage to Norway, although storm damage en route forced the destroyer to put into Trondheim for repairs that lasted until 9 January 1943. Boiler damage put her back into the dockyard there until 27 February.

On 11 March Z20 Karl Galster screened Tirpitz en route to Bogen Bay, and continued onward to Altafjord with Tirpitz, Scharnhorst, and Lützow. Several weeks later, Z20 Karl Galster, and the destroyers Z5 Paul Jacobi and Z6 Theodor Riedel, sailed for Jan Mayen island on 31 March to rendezvous with the blockade runner, MV Regensburg. They searched for several days before increasingly heavy weather forced them to return to port with storm damage. Unbeknownst to the Germans, Regensburg had been intercepted and sunk by a British cruiser on 30 March. Z20 Karl Galster took part in the raid on the island of Spitsbergen in 6–9 September, during which she landed troops on the island. Two months later the ship sailed for Bremen to begin an overhaul.

=== Further service ===
Problems with her starboard turbine, after the overhaul was finished in April 1944, put Z20 Karl Galster back in the dockyard for further work until about August when she began escorting convoys in southern Norway and helping to lay minefields in the Skagerrak. The ship continued to perform those duties until she began a brief refit in Oslo, Norway, between 20 December and 13 January 1945. Z20 Karl Galster helped to lay a minefield in the North Sea on 8 March. Afterwards, she was transferred to the Baltic and assigned to escort and patrol duties.

In May, the ship was assigned to evacuate civilians and troops trapped in ports along the Baltic Sea by advancing Soviet forces. The survivors were transported to Copenhagen, Denmark. When the German troops in Denmark surrendered on 5 May, Z20 Karl Galster transferred survivors to smaller ships outside the harbour to avoid having to surrender. There the ship received an open radio transmission by Grand Admiral (Großadmiral) Karl Dönitz asking "everybody to "Curry" who can make it until dawn on the 8th". Dönitz had chosen the word "Curry" to obscure the fact that he wanted the ships to go on a rescue mission. The German captains knew "Curry" to be the nickname of their former naval academy instructor, Admiral August Thiele, commander in Hela on the Hel Peninsula.

So the ship's final mission led back to the Peninsula, which was one of the few remaining footholds on the coast under German control on 8 May. At 22:00, two hours before the surrender became effective, Z20 Karl Galster, Z14 Friedrich Ihn, the destroyer Z25 and two torpedo boats, T23 and T28, picked up some 1,200 to 2,000 soldiers each. Every German vessel located east of Bornholm at midnight was to return to a port under Soviet control, but Z20 Karl Galster, using its superior speed, managed to outrun pursuing Soviet torpedo boats and headed to Flensburg. From there the ship was sent to Kiel, where she surrendered to the British and was decommissioned on 10 May.

=== Postwar activities ===
After the war Z20 Karl Galster sailed to Wilhelmshaven while the Allies decided how to divide the surviving ships of the Kriegsmarine amongst themselves as war reparations. The ship was allotted to the Soviet Union in late 1945 and turned over to the Soviets on 6 February 1946 in Liepāja, Latvia. She was renamed Prochnyy and assigned to the Red Banner Baltic Fleet on 5 November. Prochnyy was converted into a training ship in 1950 and was then reclassified as an accommodation ship, designated PKZ 99, on 28 November 1954. The ship was scrapped in 1958.
