= Type 1936 destroyers =

Class of German destroyers

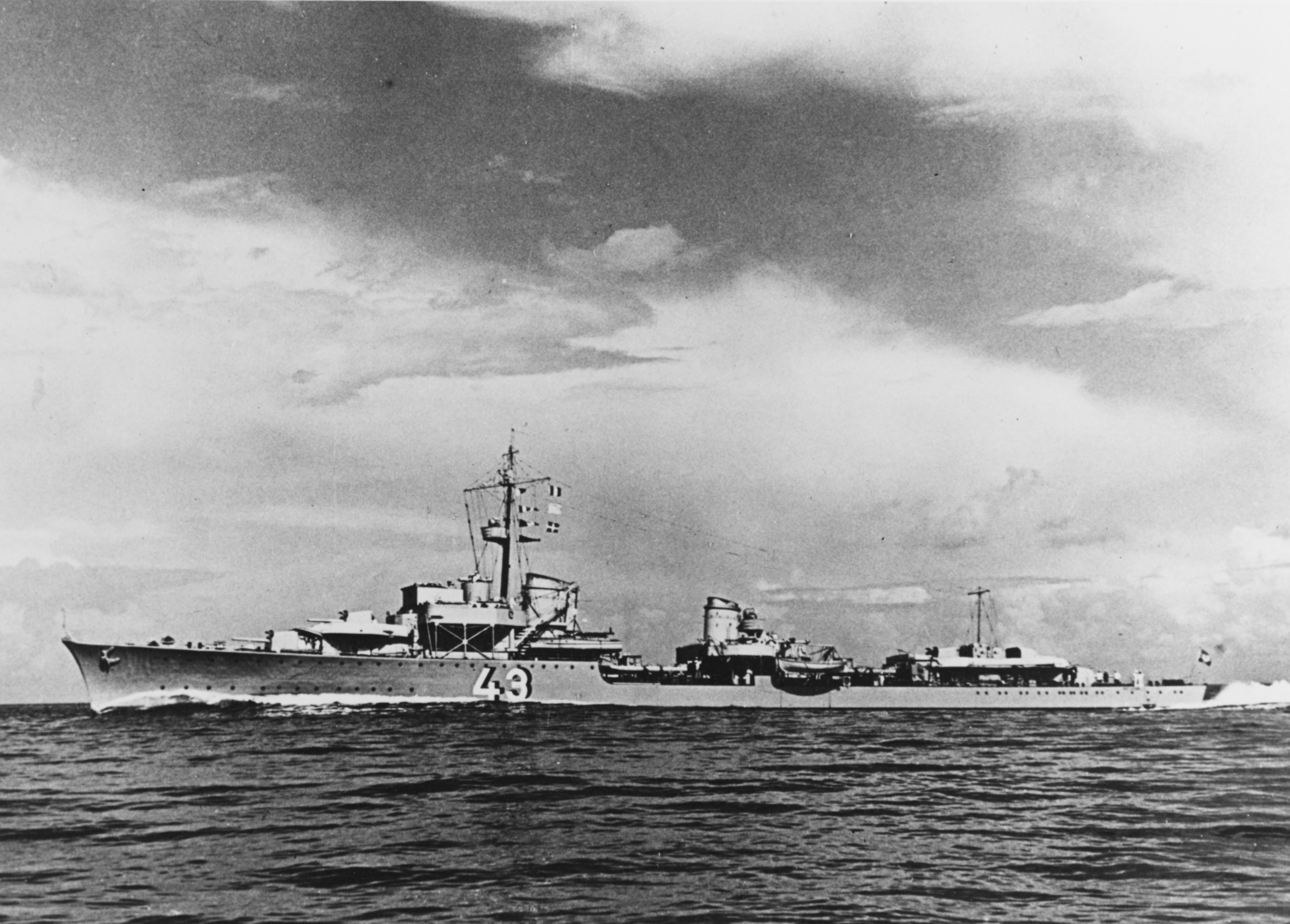
- Z21 Wilhelm Heidkamp underway, about 1939

Class overview
- Name: Type 1936 destroyer
- Builders: DeSchiMAG, Bremen
- Operators: Kriegsmarine; Soviet Navy
- Preceded by: Type 1934A destroyer
- Succeeded by: Type 1936A destroyer
- Built: 1936–1939
- In service: 1938–1958
- In commission: 1938–1954
- Planned: 6
- Completed: 6
- Lost: 5
- Scrapped: 1

General characteristics
- Type: Destroyer
- Displacement: 2,411 long tons (2,450 t) (standard); 3,415 long tons (3,470 t) deep load
- Length: 123.4 or 125.1 m (404 ft 10 in or 410 ft 5 in) o/a
- Beam: 11.75 m (38 ft 7 in)
- Draft: 4.5 m (14 ft 9 in)
- Installed power: 70,000 PS (51,000 kW; 69,000 shp); 6 × water-tube boilers
- Propulsion: 2 × shafts; 2 × geared steam turbine sets
- Speed: 36 knots (67 km/h; 41 mph)
- Range: 2,050 nmi (3,800 km; 2,360 mi) at 19 knots (35 km/h; 22 mph)
- Complement: 323
- Armament: 5 × single 12.7 cm (5 in) guns; 2 × twin 3.7 cm (1.5 in) AA guns; 6 × single 2 cm (0.79 in) AA guns; 2 × quadruple 53.3 cm (21 in) torpedo tubes; 60 mines

The Type 1936 destroyers, also known as the Z17 class, were a group of six destroyers built for Nazi Germany's Kriegsmarine during the late 1930s, shortly before the beginning of World War II. All six sister ships were named after German sailors who had been killed in World War I. They were engaged in training for most of the period between their completion and the outbreak of war, although several did participate in the occupation of Memel in Lithuania, in early 1939.

When the war began in September 1939, the sisters helped to lay minefields in the German Bight and then helped to lay multiple minefields off the British coast in late 1939 and early 1940. All but one participated in Operation Weserübung, the German invasion of Norway in April; they were all sunk or scuttled during the naval Battles of Narvik except Z20 Karl Galster which was refitting at the time. She was transferred to France in September where she engaged British ships several times. After a refit, the destroyer was transferred to Norway in preparation for Operation Barbarossa, the Axis invasion of the Soviet Union, in June 1941. Z20 Karl Galster mostly spent the rest of the year escorting convoys. After another refit, the ship briefly returned to Norway in mid-1942 until she was badly damaged in July when she ran aground and had to return home for repairs. The destroyer returned to Norway in December and remained there until November 1943, participating in Operation Zitronella in September.

Plagued by engine problems, the ship was under repair from November to August 1944 and then spent the next six months on convoy escort duties in southern Norway and laying minefields. Z20 Karl Galster was transferred to the Baltic Sea in early 1945 where she escorted refugee convoys and also evacuated refugees herself from the advancing Soviet forces before the German surrender in May. The ship was allotted to the Soviets after the war and she was converted into a training ship in 1950 before she was scrapped in 1958.

== Design and description ==
These six ships were improved and enlarged versions of the Type 1934 and Type 1934A classes. Even though they were designed before the earlier ships were completed, the stability problem was partially fixed by reducing top-weight which allowed their full oil capacity to be used, their turning radius was slightly reduced and the bow was reshaped to reduce the amount of water coming over the bow in a head sea. These changes improved their seakeeping ability in comparison to the previous destroyer classes. They still retained the over-complicated and troublesome boilers of the earlier ships.

The first three ships built had an overall length of 123.4 meters (404 ft 10 in) and the later trio were modified while under construction with a clipper bow that increased their overall length to 125.1 meters (410 ft 5 in); all six ships were 120 meters (393 ft 8 in) long at the waterline. They had a beam of 11.75 meters (38 ft 7 in), and a maximum draft of 4.5 meters (14 ft 9 in). The Type 36s displaced 2,411 long tons (2,450 t) at standard load and 3,415 long tons (3,470 t) at deep load. The destroyers had a metacentric height of 0.95 meters (3 ft 1 in) at deep load. They were divided into 15 watertight compartments of which the middle 7 contained the propulsion and auxiliary machinery and were protected by a partial double bottom. Active stabilizers were initially fitted to reduce roll, but they proved to be ineffective and were replaced by bilge keels on all the destroyers except Z20 Karl Galster before April 1940. They had a complement of 10 officers and 313 enlisted men, plus an additional 4 officers and 19 enlisted men if serving as a flotilla flagship.

The Type 1936s were powered by two Wagner geared steam turbine sets, each driving a single three-bladed 3.25-meter (10 ft 8 in) propeller using steam provided by six high-pressure Wagner water-tube boilers with superheaters that operated at a pressure of 70 atm (7,093 kPa; 1,029 psi) and a temperature of 450 °C (842 °F). The turbines, designed to produce 70,000 metric horsepower (51,000 kW; 69,000 shp), were intended to give the ships a speed of 36 knots (67 km/h; 41 mph). The first four ships were able to conduct full sets of speed trials before the start of the war and they handily exceeded their designed speed, reaching 39–41.5 knots (72.2–76.9 km/h; 44.9–47.8 mph) from 72,100–76,500 shp (53,800–57,000 kW; 73,100–77,600 PS). They were fitted with a pair of 200-kilowatt (270 hp) turbogenerators plus two 80-kilowatt (110 hp) and a single 40-kilowatt (54 hp) diesel generators. The ships carried a maximum of 739 metric tons (727 long tons) of fuel oil which gave a range of 2,050 nautical miles (3,800 km; 2,360 mi) at 19 knots (35 km/h; 22 mph).

The Type 1936 ships were armed with five 12.7 cm (5 in) SK C/34 guns in single mounts with gun shields. One pair each was superimposed, fore and aft of the superstructure and the fifth mount was positioned on top of the rear superstructure. They carried 600 rounds of ammunition for these guns, which had a maximum range of 17.4 kilometres (19,000 yd), and could be elevated to 30° and depressed to −10°. Their anti-aircraft armament was made up of four 3.7 cm (1.5 in) SK C/30 anti-aircraft guns in single mounts, with 8,000 rounds of ammunition, and six 2 cm (0.79 in) C/30 anti-aircraft guns in single mounts, with 12,000 rounds of ammunition. The ships carried eight above-water 53.3 cm (21 in) torpedo tubes in two power-operated mounts amidships. Four depth charge throwers were mounted on the sides of the rear deckhouse and they were supplemented by six racks for individual depth charges on the sides of the stern. Sufficient depth charges were carried for either two or four patterns of sixteen charges each. Mine rails could be fitted on the rear deck that had a maximum capacity of sixty mines. 'GHG' (Gruppenhorchgerät) passive hydrophones were fitted to detect submarines and an active sonar system was installed by the end of 1939.

Z20 Karl Galster had a FuMO 21 (Note: Funkmess-Ortung (Radio-direction finder, active ranging)) search radar installed in 1942 and her anti-aircraft suite was upgraded several times over the course of the war. By the end, it consisted of six 3.7 cm guns and fifteen 2 cm weapons.

== Ships ==
List of Type 1936 destroyers
| Ship | Builder | Laid down | Launched | Commissioned | Fate |
|---|---|---|---|---|---|
| Z17 Diether von Roeder | DeSchiMAG, Bremen | 9 September 1936 | 19 August 1937 | 29 August 1938 | Beached and destroyed during the Battles of Narvik, 13 April 1940 |
| Z18 Hans Lüdemann | DeSchiMAG, Bremen | 9 September 1936 | 1 December 1937 | 8 October 1938 | Beached and destroyed during the Battles of Narvik, 13 April 1940 |
| Z19 Hermann Künne | DeSchiMAG, Bremen | 5 October 1936 | 22 December 1937 | 12 January 1939 | Beached and destroyed during the Battles of Narvik, 13 April 1940 |
| Z20 Karl Galster | DeSchiMAG, Bremen | 14 September 1937 | 15 June 1938 | 21 March 1939 | Transferred to the USSR, 1946; scrapped, 1958 |
| Z21 Wilhelm Heidkamp | DeSchiMAG, Bremen | 14 December 1937 | 28 August 1938 | 20 June 1939 | Sunk by torpedo during the Battles of Narvik, 10 April 1940 |
| Z22 Anton Schmitt | DeSchiMAG, Bremen | 3 January 1938 | 20 September 1938 | 24 September 1939 | Sunk by torpedo during the Battles of Narvik, 10 April 1940 |

== Service history ==
Z17 Diether von Roeder and Z19 Hermann Künne were two of the destroyers that escorted Adolf Hitler when Germany occupied Memel in March 1939. When the war began in September, Z21 Wilhelm Heidkamp and Z22 Anton Schmitt were still working up so only Z17 Diether von Roeder, Z18 Hans Lüdemann, Z19 Hermann Künne and Z20 Karl Galster were deployed to lay minefields off the German coast. They were soon transferred to the Skagerrak where they inspected neutral shipping for contraband goods and were joined there by Z21 Wilhelm Heidkamp by the end of the month.

Beginning in mid-October and continuing through February 1940, the Kriegsmarine began using its destroyers to lay offensive minefields off the British coast on dark nights with little to no moonlight. The sisters (Z22 Anton Schmitt became operational in January) participated in five of the eleven sorties and their mines helped to sink a British destroyer and 121,348 gross register tons (GRT) of merchant shipping.

=== Norwegian Campaign ===
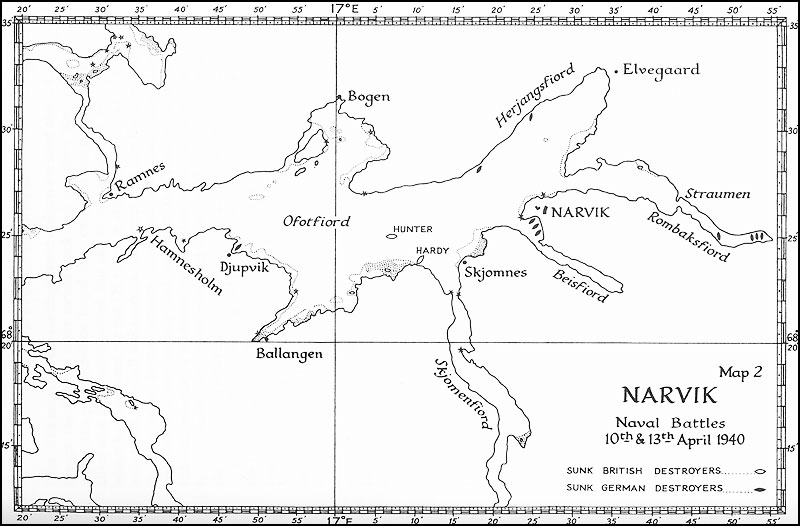
A map of the Ofotfjord

Z21 Wilhelm Heidkamp was the flagship for Group 1 for the Norwegian portion of Operation Weserübung in April 1940. The group's task was to transport mountain infantry to seize Narvik. The ships began loading troops on 6 April in Wesermünde and set sail the next day.

On 9 April, Z22 Anton Schmitt and Z18 Hans Lüdemann landed troops at the entrance to the Ofotfjord while their sisters proceeded to Narvik and Elvegårdsmoen to unload their troops. Z21 Wilhelm Heidkamp sank an old coastal defense ship in Narvik harbor after an attempt to get her captain to surrender failed. All of the destroyers were short on oil; fueling proceeded very slowly and only three destroyers had completed doing so by the following morning, although Z18 Hans Lüdemann and Z19 Hermann Künne were in the process of doing so when the five destroyers of the British 2nd Destroyer Flotilla appeared shortly after dawn. Caught totally by surprise, the initial torpedo salvo sank Z21 Wilhelm Heidkamp and Z22 Anton Schmitt and lightly damaged Z19 Hermann Künne. British shells also damaged Z18 Hans Lüdemann and crippled Z17 Diether von Roeder. The German destroyers unsuccessfully returned fire with several torpedoes passing underneath the British ships.

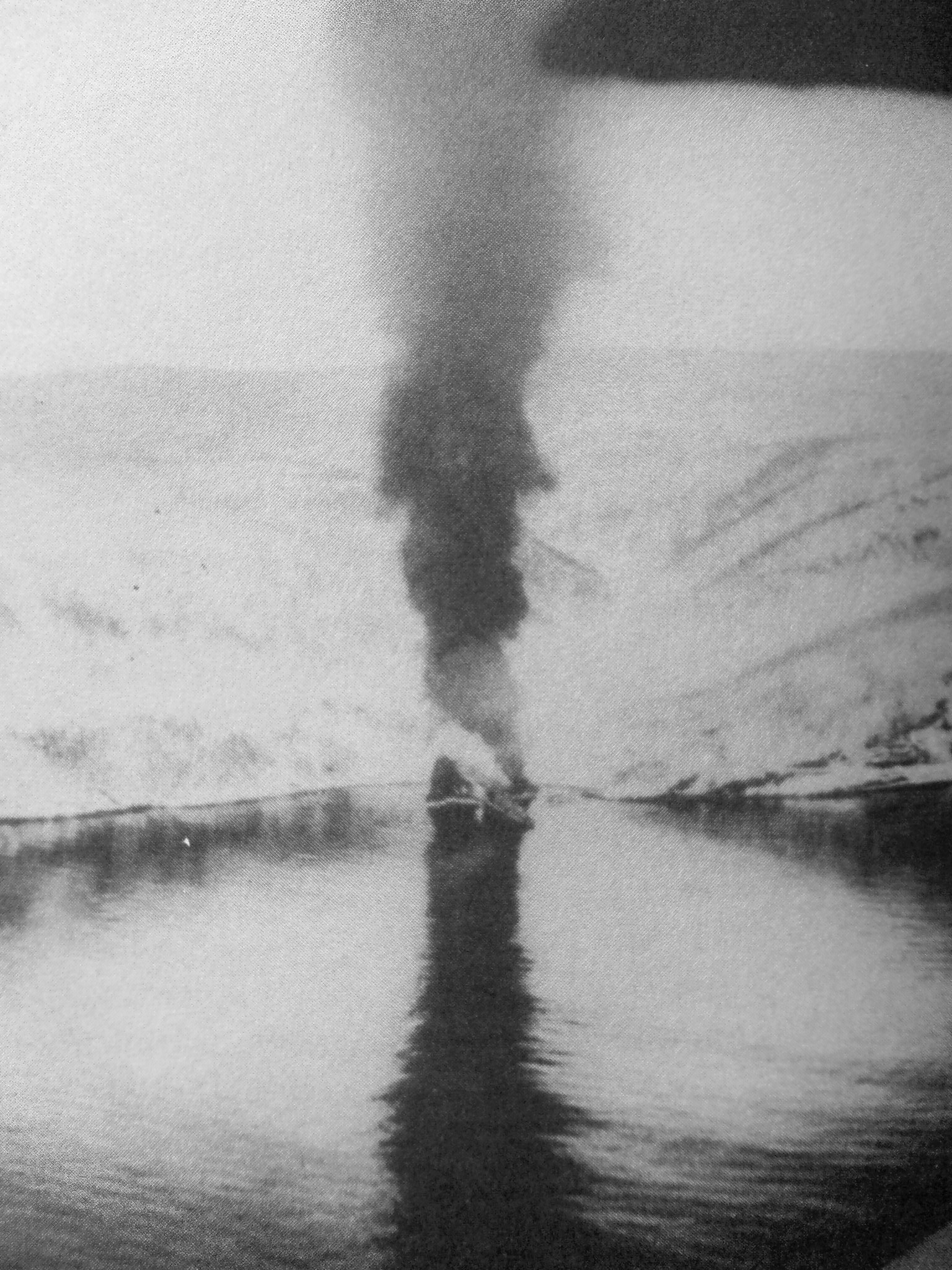
Z19 Hermann Künne burning on 13 April 1940

On the night of 12/13 April, the Germans received word to expect an attack the following day by British capital ships escorted by a large number of destroyers and supported by carrier aircraft. The battleship Warspite and nine destroyers duly appeared on 13 April, although earlier than expected, and caught the Germans out of position. Z19 Hermann Künne was the first ship to spot the approaching British ships and alerted the other ships. The other operable destroyers (Z17 Diether von Roeder was still under repair in Narvik harbor) joined Z19 Hermann Künne as she fell back and engaged the British ships at long range from behind a smoke screen, inflicting only splinter damage; they were not damaged by the British return fire. By the early afternoon, the Germans had exhausted most of their ammunition and the destroyers were ordered to retreat to the Rombaksfjorden (the easternmost branch of the Ofotfjord), east of Narvik, where they might attempt to ambush any pursuing British destroyers. Z19 Hermann Künne's captain misunderstood the signal and headed north into the Herjangsfjord where he ran the ship aground. She had fired off all of her ammunition, including practice and star shells; her depth charges were rigged for demolition and they were set off once the crew had abandoned ship. A pair of British destroyers followed her into the fjord and put a torpedo into the wreck for good measure, breaking off her stern.

Z18 Hans Lüdemann still had some ammunition and torpedoes left and took up position at the Straumen narrows with Z2 Georg Thiele to give the two other remaining destroyers time to scuttle themselves at the head of the fjord. The pursuing British destroyers initially engaged Z18 Hans Lüdemann, which had opened fire at a range of about 3 miles (4,800 m) to little effect. Her four remaining torpedoes were fired blindly, one of which was observed to pass under a destroyer and all missed. Shortly afterwards the British ships hit the German destroyer twice, destroying No. 4 and No. 5 guns and damaging No. 3 gun, the only ones that could bear on the British ships. Z18 Hans Lüdemann's captain decided to withdraw as she could no longer fight the British ships and beached the ship at the head of the fjord. He ordered her rigged for demolition and abandoned ship while Z2 Georg Thiele continued to fight. Several hours later, after the latter ship was destroyed, British destroyers approached and found Z18 Hans Lüdemann still intact, the demolition charges having failed. Following their orders to destroy all of the German destroyers, they torpedoed her wreck.

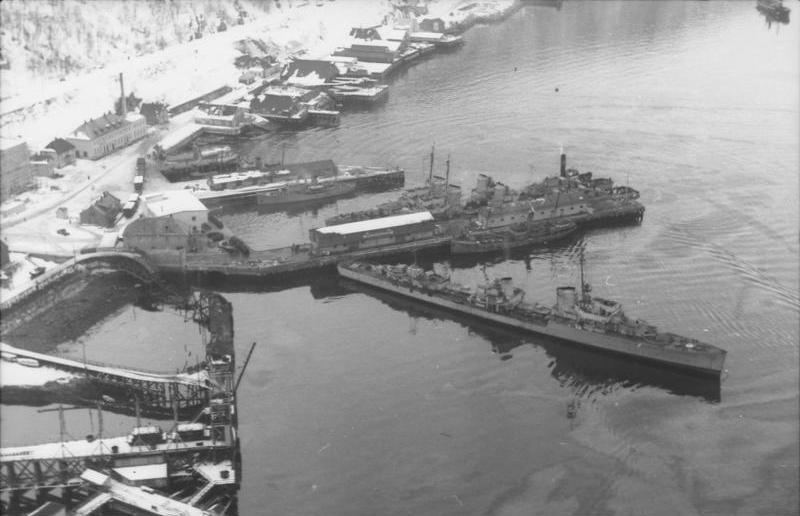
Z17 Diether von Roeder (front) at Narvik, the destroyer in the back is Z9 Wolfgang Zenker. The smaller vessels are captured Norwegian patrol boats.

When the British appeared at the harbor mouth they initially thought that they were being fired upon by coastal artillery in the smoke and confusion, but a reconnaissance aircraft spotted Z17 Diether von Roeder. The destroyer Cossack moved through the sunken freighters to investigate and opened fire at point-blank range. She set the German ship's stern aflame, but Z17 Diether von Roeder's return fire was devastating. The British destroyer was hit at least seven times that caused her to run aground. Other British ships returned fire, but the gunners had abandoned ship once their ammunition was exhausted and only the three-man demolition party was still aboard when a British destroyer approached. They lit the fuses and ran ashore and the depth charges blew her apart before she could be boarded.

=== The sole survivor ===
After a refit that prevented Z20 Karl Galster from participating in Operation Weserübung, the ship was sent to Norway for escort duties. Later that year she was transferred to France later as the flagship of the 5th Destroyer Flotilla (5. Zerstörerflotille), where she conducted anti-shipping patrols and laid a minefield in the English Channel with little success.

The ship returned to Germany at the end of the year for a refit and was transferred to Norway in June as part of the preparations for Operation Barbarossa. Z20 Karl Galster spent some time at the beginning of the campaign conducting anti-shipping patrols in Soviet waters but these were generally fruitless. She escorted a number of German convoys in the Arctic later in the year until engine problems sent her back to Germany for repairs. The ship returned to Norway in mid-1942, but was badly damaged when she ran aground in July and did not return until December. Z20 Karl Galster participated in Operation Zitronella, the German attack on the Norwegian island of Spitzbergen, well north of the Arctic Circle, in September 1943. Plagued by engine problems, the ship was under repair from November to August 1944 and then spent the next six months on convoy escort duties in southern Norway when not laying minefields.

Around March 1945, Z20 Karl Galster was transferred to the Baltic Sea where she helped to escort convoys of refugee ships and also rescued evacuees herself in May, around the time that Germany surrendered. When the surviving German warships were divided between the Allies after the war, the ship was eventually allocated to the Soviet Union. Z20 Karl Galster was handed over in 1946 and renamed Prochnyy. The ship was converted into a training ship in 1950 and then became an accommodation ship in 1954. She was scrapped four years later.
