= German destroyer Z17 Diether von Roeder =

Type 1936-class destroyer

Coordinates: 68°25′N 17°24′E

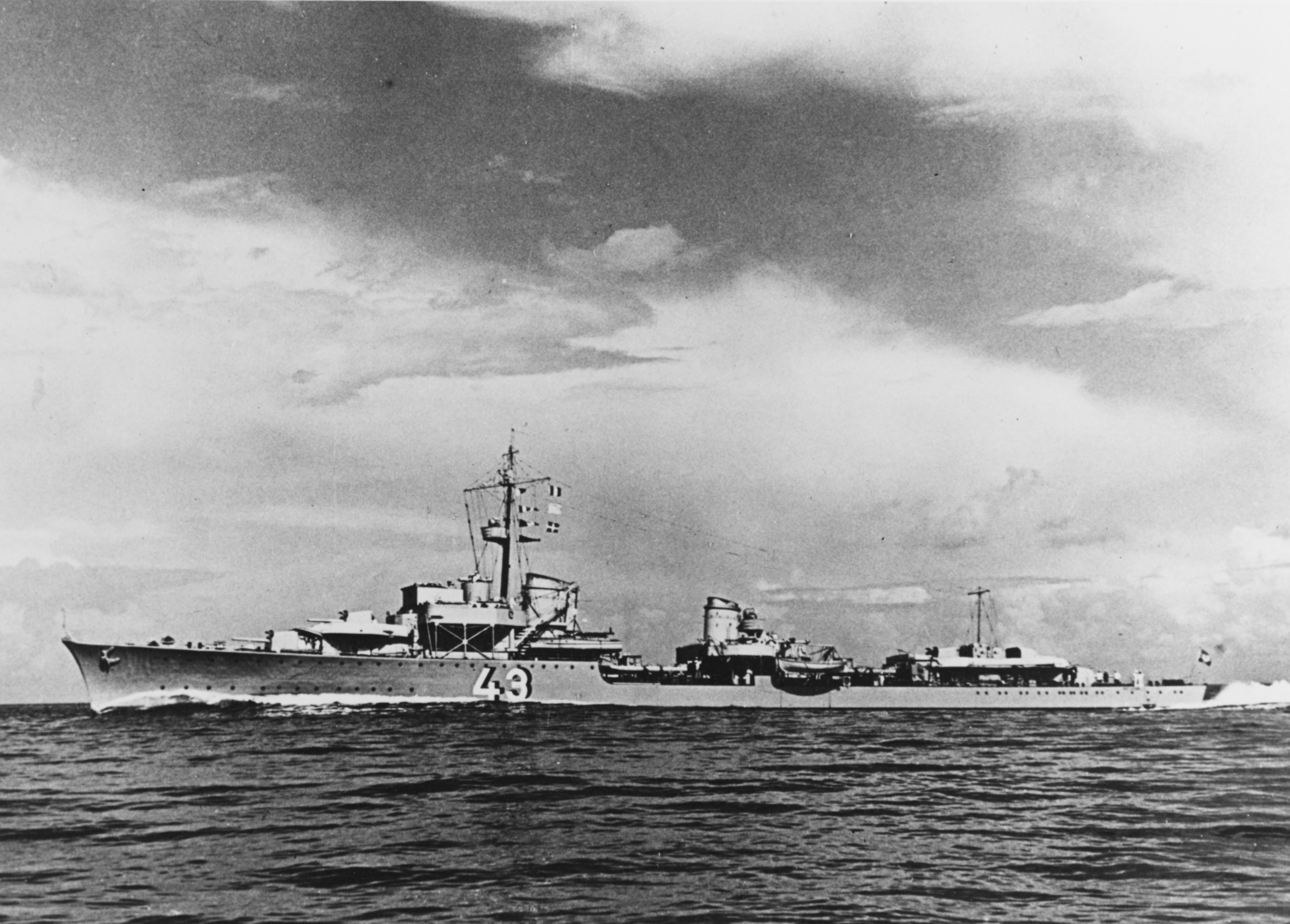
- Sister ship Z21 Wilhelm Heidkamp underway, c. 1939

History

Nazi Germany
- Name: Z17 Diether von Roeder
- Namesake: Diether von Roeder
- Ordered: 6 January 1936
- Builder: AG Weser (Deschimag), Bremen
- Yard number: 919
- Laid down: 9 September 1936
- Launched: 19 August 1937
- Commissioned: 29 August 1938
- Fate: Scuttled, 13 April 1940

General characteristics
- Class & type: Type 1936 destroyer
- Displacement: 2,411 long tons (2,450 t) (standard); 3,415 long tons (3,470 t) (deep load)
- Length: 123.4 m (404 ft 10 in) (o/a)
- Beam: 11.8 m (38 ft 9 in)
- Draft: 4.5 m (14 ft 9 in)
- Installed power: 70,000 PS (51,000 kW; 69,000 shp); 6 × water-tube boilers
- Propulsion: 2 × shafts; 2 × geared steam turbine sets
- Speed: 36 knots (67 km/h; 41 mph)
- Range: 2,050 nmi (3,800 km; 2,360 mi) at 19 knots (35 km/h; 22 mph)
- Complement: 323
- Armament: 5 × single 12.7 cm (5 in) guns; 2 × twin 3.7 cm (1.5 in) AA guns; 6 × single 2 cm (0.79 in) AA guns; 2 × quadruple 53.3 cm (21 in) torpedo tubes; 4 × depth charge throwers; 60 mines

Z17 Diether von Roeder was one of six Type 1936 destroyers built for the Kriegsmarine (German Navy) in the late 1930s. Completed in 1938, the ship spent most of her time training although she did participate in the occupation of Memel in early 1939. At the beginning of World War II in September, the ship was initially deployed to lay minefields off the German coast, but was soon transferred to the Skagerrak where she inspected neutral shipping for contraband goods. In late 1939, the ship helped lay an offensive minefield off the English coast that claimed seven merchant ships.

During the German invasion of Norway in April 1940, Z17 Diether von Roeder was tasked to attack Narvik and participated in both the First and Second Naval Battles of Narvik. She was crippled by British destroyers during the first battle, but was able to severely damage a British destroyer during the second battle, before she had to be scuttled to prevent her capture.

== Design and description ==
Diether von Roeder had an overall length of 123.4 meters (404 ft 10 in) and was 120 meters (393 ft 8 in) long at the waterline. The ship had a beam of 11.8 meters (38 ft 9 in), and a maximum draft of 4.5 meters (14 ft 9 in). She displaced 2,411 long tons (2,450 t) at standard load and 3,415 long tons (3,470 t) at deep load. The two Wagner geared steam turbine sets, each driving one propeller shaft, were designed to produce 70,000 PS (51,000 kW; 69,000 shp) using steam provided by six Wagner water-tube boilers. Z17 Diether von Roeder had a designed speed of 36 knots (67 km/h; 41 mph), but she reached 41.45 knots (76.8 km/h; 47.7 mph) from 72,500 PS (53,300 kW; 71,500 shp) during her sea trials. The ship carried a maximum of 739 metric tons (727 long tons) of fuel oil which gave a range of 2,050 nautical miles (3,800 km; 2,360 mi) at 19 knots (35 km/h; 22 mph). Her crew consisted of 10 officers and 313 sailors.

The ship carried five 12.7-centimeter (5.0 in) SK C/34 guns in single mounts with gun shields, two each superimposed, fore and aft of the superstructure. The fifth mount was positioned on top of the rear deckhouse. The guns were numbered from 1 to 5 from front to rear. Her anti-aircraft armament consisted of four 3.7-centimeter (1.5 in) SK C/30 guns in two twin mounts abreast the rear funnel and six 2-centimeter (0.8 in) C/30 guns in single mounts. The ship carried eight above-water 53.3-centimeter (21.0 in) torpedo tubes in two power-operated mounts. Two reloads were provided for each mount. She had four depth charge launchers and mine rails could be fitted on the rear deck that had a maximum capacity of 60 mines. 'GHG' (Gruppenhorchgerät) passive hydrophones were fitted to detect submarines and an active sonar system was installed by the end of 1939.

== Construction and career ==
Z17 Diether von Roeder was named after Lieutenant (Kapitänleutnant) Diether von Roeder who commanded the 13th Torpedo Boat Half-Flotilla in World War I and was killed in action on 11 June 1918. The ship was ordered from AG Weser (Deschimag) on 6 January 1936. She was laid down at Deschimag's Bremen shipyard as yard number W919 on 9 September, launched on 19 August 1937, and commissioned on 29 August 1938. From 23 to 24 March 1939, the ship was one of the destroyers that escorted Adolf Hitler aboard the heavy cruiser Deutschland to occupy Memel. She participated in the fleet exercise the next month in the western Mediterranean and made several visits to Spanish and Moroccan ports in April and May. In July, Z17 Diether von Roeder joined her sisters Z18 Hans Lüdemann and Z19 Hermann Künne making port visits in Norway.

When World War II began in September, she was initially deployed in the German Bight where she laid defensive minefields. The ship then patrolled the Skagerrak to inspect neutral shipping for contraband goods. On the night of 17/18 October, Rear Admiral (Konteradmiral) Günther Lütjens, aboard his flagship Z21 Wilhelm Heidkamp, led Z16 Friedrich Eckoldt, Z17 Diether von Roeder, Z18 Hans Lüdemann, Z19 Hermann Künne, and Z20 Karl Galster as they laid a minefield off the mouth of the River Humber. The British were unaware of the minefield's existence and lost seven ships totaling 25,825 gross register tons (GRT).

=== Norwegian Campaign ===
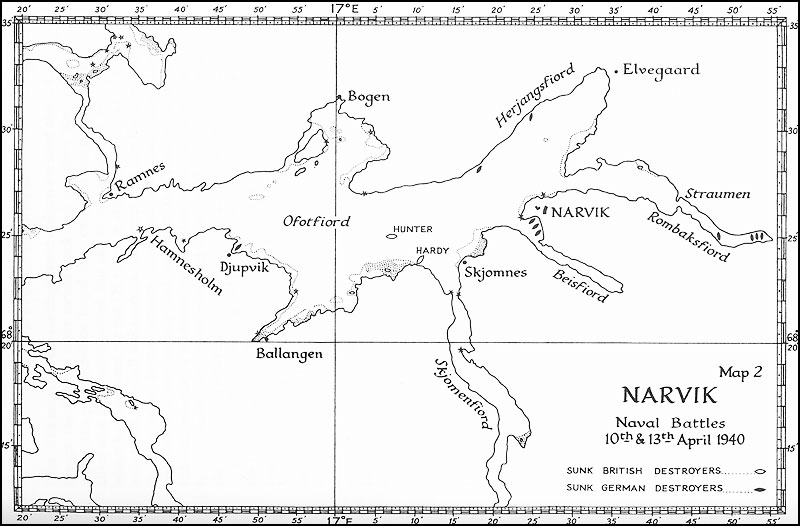
A map of the Ofotfjord

Z17 Diether von Roeder was allocated to Group 1 for the Norwegian portion of Operation Weserübung in April 1940. The group's task was to transport the 139th Mountain Infantry Regiment (139. Gebirgsjäger Regiment) and the headquarters of the 3rd Mountain Division (3. Gebirgs-Division) to seize Narvik. The ships began loading troops on 6 April and set sail the next day. When they arrived off the Ofotfjord on the morning of 9 April, the ship remained at the mouth of the fjord while the other destroyers continued into the fjord to land their troops; she was tasked to serve as a picket ship to warn of any British attempt to interfere with the landings. Z17 Diether von Roeder was relieved later in the day to land her troops, but resumed her task the following night. Lieutenant Commander (Korvettenkapitän) Erich Holtorf, the ship's captain, believed that his orders ended at dawn and returned to Narvik harbor.

Unbeknownst to the Germans, the five destroyers of the British 2nd Destroyer Flotilla, Hardy, Havock, Hunter, Hotspur, and Hero were not far behind him, invisible in the dark and snow. They torpedoed two German destroyers and badly damaged two others while Z17 Diether von Roeder fired all of her torpedoes blindly at the harbor entrance and attempted to engage the British ships with her guns despite the driving snow. All of the torpedoes missed, possibly because their depth controls were set too deep, and her gunfire was ineffective. Visibility cleared as the leading British ships finished their attack on the harbor and several of them engaged Z17 Diether von Roeder. She was hit by at least five 4.7-inch (120 mm) shells that destroyed No. 3 gun, severed the controls to the rudder, damaged the center and aft boiler rooms, knocking out all power, and set an oil tank on fire. The British shells killed nine of the ship's crew; most of the survivors were used to help secure the town of Narvik. Z17 Diether von Roeder's radios were taken ashore and used to improve communications with other German commands within Norway.

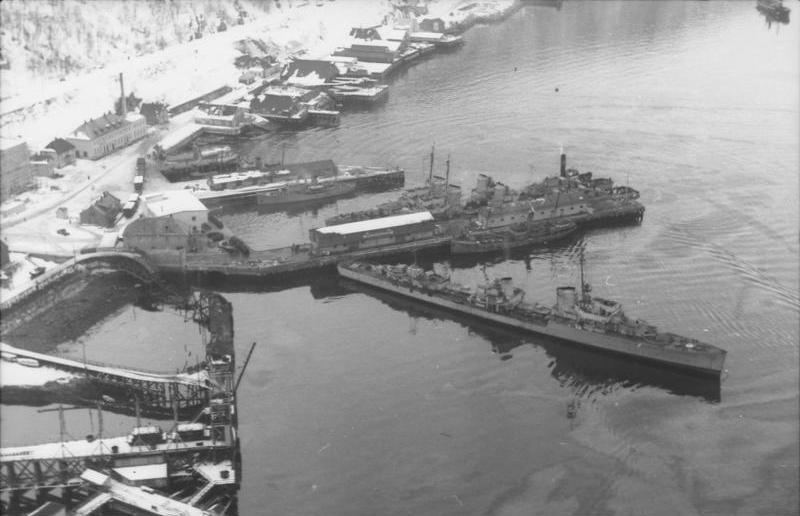
Z17 Diether von Roeder (front) at Narvik, the destroyer in the back is Z9 Wolfgang Zenker. The smaller vessels are captured Norwegian patrol boats.

Over the next several days, the ship's damage was evaluated and the Germans estimated that it would take at least a week to make her mobile again. In the meantime, her light weapons were off-loaded and her stern was tied to the pier in the harbor with her bow angled outwards. This meant that only her two forward guns could bear on targets. On the night of 12/13 April, Commander (Fregattenkapitän) Erich Bey, the senior surviving German officer, received word to expect an attack the following day by British capital ships escorted by a large number of destroyers and supported by carrier aircraft. The battleship Warspite and nine destroyers duly appeared on 13 April, although earlier than Bey had expected, and caught the Germans out of position.

When the British destroyers Punjabi and Bedouin appeared at the harbor mouth, engaging Z12 Erich Giese, the 25 gunners left on board opened fire on whatever British ships were visible, including Warspite. One of the Z17 Diether von Roeder's shells hit the battleship's bridge, but only caused minor damage. The British initially thought that they were fired upon by coastal artillery in the smoke and confusion, but a report from a Fairey Swordfish torpedo bomber from Warspite revealed the German ship. The destroyer Cossack moved through the sunken freighters to investigate and opened fire at 2,500 meters (2,700 yd). She started making hits with her second salvo and set the German ship's stern aflame, but Z17 Diether von Roeder's return fire was devastating. The British destroyer was hit at least seven times that severed the steam pipe to the forward boiler room, damaged the center boiler room, started a fire, and knocked out her steering gear, causing her to run aground. The German shells killed 9 men and wounded 21. The destroyer Kimberley and Warspite returned fire, the latter even hitting Z17 Diether von Roeder once, but the gunners had abandoned ship once their ammunition was exhausted and only the three-man demolition party was still aboard when the destroyer Foxhound approached. They lit the fuses and ran ashore; the depth charges packed into her interior exploded when the British ship was less than 50 meters (55 yd) away with a boarding party ready.
