= German destroyer Z14 Friedrich Ihn =

Type 1934A-class destroyer

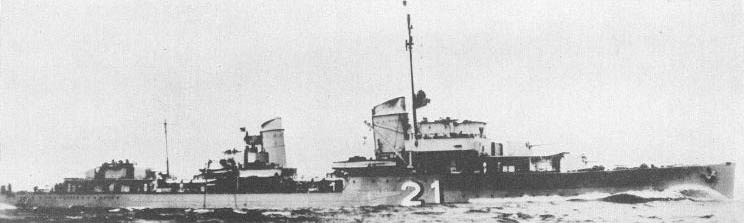
- Her sister ship Z5 Paul Jakobi c. 1938

History

Nazi Germany
- Name: Z14 Friedrich Ihn
- Namesake: Friedrich Ihn
- Ordered: 9 January 1935
- Builder: Blohm & Voss, Hamburg
- Yard number: B503
- Laid down: 30 May 1935
- Launched: 5 November 1935
- Completed: 6 April 1938
- Commissioned: 9 April 1938
- Fate: Allocated to the Soviet Union as a war prize

Soviet Union
- Name: Prytky
- Acquired: November 1945
- Stricken: 22 March 1952
- Fate: Sold for scrap and broken up

General characteristics (as built)
- Class & type: Type 1934A-class destroyer
- Displacement: 2,239 long tons (2,275 t) (standard); 3,165 long tons (3,216 t) (deep load)
- Length: 119 m (390 ft 5 in) (o/a); 114 m (374 ft 0 in) (w/l)
- Beam: 11.30 m (37 ft 1 in)
- Draft: 4.23 m (13 ft 11 in)
- Installed power: 70,000 PS (51,000 kW; 69,000 shp); 6 × water-tube boilers
- Propulsion: 2 shafts, 2 × geared steam turbines
- Speed: 36 knots (67 km/h; 41 mph)
- Range: 1,530 nmi (2,830 km; 1,760 mi) at 19 knots (35 km/h; 22 mph)
- Complement: 325
- Armament: 5 × single 12.7 cm (5 in) guns; 2 × twin 3.7 cm (1.5 in) AA guns; 6 × single 2 cm (0.8 in) AA guns; 2 × quadruple 53.3 cm (21 in) torpedo tubes; 60 mines; 32–64 depth charges, 4 throwers and 6 individual racks

Z14 Friedrich Ihn was a Type 1934A-class destroyer built for Nazi Germany's Kriegsmarine in the mid-1930s. The ship was named after the First World War German naval officer Friedrich Ihn. At the beginning of World War II, the ship was initially deployed to blockade the Polish coast, but she was quickly transferred to the German Bight to lay defensive minefields in German waters. In late 1939 and early 1940, the ship laid multiple offensive minefields off the English coast that claimed 18 merchant ships and a destroyer. Ihn was under repair during the Norwegian Campaign of early 1940 and was transferred to France later that year.

After a lengthy refit in Germany, she returned to France in early 1941 where she escorted returning warships, commerce raiders, and supply ships through the Bay of Biscay for several months. She remained in Germany for the rest of the year after returning in July. The ship was transferred to France in early 1942 to escort the capital ships as they sailed through the English Channel to return to Germany (the Channel Dash). Ihn was then transferred to Norway where she participated in several unsuccessful attacks on convoys to the Soviet Union. Afterwards she returned to Germany and remained there for the rest of the year. The ship spent most of 1943 in the northern Norway although she was mostly inactive because of fuel shortages. Ihn was ordered home for a long refit late in the year and she was sent to southern Norway upon its completion in mid-1944. The ship remained there for the rest of the war, although she made several trips to evacuate refugees from East Prussia in the last days of the war.

Ihn was eventually allocated to the Soviets when the surviving warships were divided between the Allies after the war. Little is known about her service with the Soviet Navy and she was probably scrapped sometime in the 1960s.

== Design and description ==
Friedrich Ihn had an overall length of 119 meters (390 ft 5 in) and was 114 meters (374 ft) long at the waterline. The ship had a beam of 11.30 meters (37 ft 1 in), and a maximum draft of 4.23 meters (13 ft 11 in). She displaced 2,239 long tons (2,275 t) at standard and 3,165 long tons (3,216 t) at deep load. The Wagner geared steam turbines were designed to produce 70,000 metric horsepower (51,000 kW; 69,000 shp) which would propel the ship at 36 knots (67 km/h; 41 mph). Steam was provided to the turbines by six high-pressure Benson boilers with superheaters. Friedrich Ihn carried a maximum of 752 metric tons (740 long tons) of fuel oil which was intended to give a range of 4,400 nautical miles (8,100 km; 5,100 mi) at 19 knots (35 km/h; 22 mph), but the ship proved top-heavy in service and 30% of the fuel had to be retained as ballast low in the ship. The effective range proved to be only 1,530 nmi (2,830 km; 1,760 mi) at 19 knots (35 km/h; 22 mph). The ship's crew consisted of 10 officers and 315 sailors.

Friedrich Ihn carried five 12.7 cm SK C/34 guns in single mounts with gun shields, two each superimposed, fore and aft. The fifth gun was carried on top of the rear deckhouse. Her anti-aircraft armament consisted of four 3.7 cm SK C/30 guns in two twin mounts abreast the rear funnel and six 2 cm C/30 guns in single mounts. The ship carried eight above-water 53.3-centimeter (21.0 in) torpedo tubes in two power-operated mounts. A pair of reload torpedoes were provided for each mount. Four depth charge throwers were mounted on the sides of the rear deckhouse and they were supplemented by six racks for individual depth charges on the sides of the stern. Sufficient depth charges were carried for either two or four patterns of sixteen charges each. Mine rails could be fitted on the rear deck that had a maximum capacity of sixty mines. 'GHG' (Gruppenhorchgerät) passive hydrophones were fitted to detect submarines and an active sonar system was installed by February 1941.

=== Modifications ===
During the war the ship's light anti-aircraft armament was augmented several times. In April 1941, improved 2 cm C/38 guns replaced the original C/30 guns and three additional guns were added. The two guns on the aft shelter deck were replaced at some point by a single 2 cm quadruple Flakvierling mount, probably in 1942. Sometime in 1944–45, Z14 Friedrich Ihn received a partial "Barbara" anti-aircraft refit where twin 2 cm mounts replaced her singles, giving her a total of eighteen 2 cm barrels.

== Construction and career ==
Friedrich Ihn, named after the commander of the torpedo boat S35, who was killed during the Battle of Jutland in 1916, was ordered on 19 January 1935 from Blohm & Voss. She was laid down at their shipyard in Hamburg on 30 May 1935 as yard number B503, launched on 5 November 1935 and completed on 6 April 1938. The ship participated in the August 1938 Fleet Review as part of the 3rd Destroyer Division. On 23–24 March 1939, Friedrich Ihn was one of the destroyers escorting Adolf Hitler aboard the pocket battleship Deutschland as the Germans occupied Memel. She participated in the Spring fleet exercise in the western Mediterranean and made several visits to Spanish and Moroccan ports in April and May.

When World War II began, Friedrich Ihn was initially deployed in the Baltic to operate against the Polish Navy and to enforce a blockade of Poland, but she was soon transferred to the German Bight where she joined her sister ships in laying defensive minefields. She also patrolled the Skagerrak to inspect neutral shipping for contraband goods in October. The ship was scheduled to conduct a minelaying operation off the British coast in early November, but it was cancelled when one of the other destroyers assigned to participate suffered machinery problems from contaminated fuel oil.

On the night of 12/13 December, German destroyers sortied to lay minefields off the British coast. Under the command of Commodore (Kommodore) Friedrich Bonte in his flagship Hermann Künne, Friedrich Ihn, Bruno Heinemann, Richard Beitzen, and Erich Steinbrinck laid 240 mines off the mouth of the River Tyne, where the navigation lights were still lit. The British were unaware of the minefield's existence and lost eleven ships totaling 18,979 gross register tons (GRT). The destroyers were later ordered to escort the crippled light cruisers Leipzig and Nürnberg which had been torpedoed by the submarine HMS Salmon while covering the destroyers' withdrawal. Ihn and Steinbrinck had machinery problems en route and were forced to return to port before they reached the cruisers. Ihn and her sisters Friedrich Eckoldt and Steinbrinck sortied again on the night of 18 December, but the British had turned off the navigation lights off Orfordness and the German were forced to abandon the attempt because they could not locate themselves precisely enough to lay the minefield in the proper position.

=== 1940 ===
Another minefield of 170 magnetic mines was laid by Ihn, Eckolt, and her sister Steinbrinck on the night of 6/7 January 1940 off the Thames Estuary. The destroyer HMS Grenville and six merchant ships totalling 21,617 GRT were lost to this minefield as well and another ship was damaged as well. Bonte led a destroyer minelaying sortie to the Newcastle area on the night of 10/11 January with Ihn, Heidkamp, Eckoldt, Anton Schmitt, Beitzen, and Karl Galster. Ihn had problems with her boilers that reduced her maximum speed to 27 knots (50 km/h; 31 mph) and she had to be escorted back to Germany by Beitzen. This minefield only claimed one fishing trawler of 251 tons.

Ihn was under repairs during Operation Weserübung in April and did not leave the dockyard until May when she began working up as part of the 5th Destroyer Flotilla. The flotilla was transferred to the Atlantic Coast of France in early September and was attacked by Bristol Blenheim bombers of the Royal Air Force on 11 September while crossing the Baie de la Seine without result, although Ihn was near-missed. Now based at Brest the flotilla laid a minefield in Falmouth Bay during the night of 28/29 September. Five ships totalling only 2,026 GRT were sunk by this minefield. Led by Kapitän zur See Erich Bey, Ihn and four other destroyers sortied for the Southwest Approaches on 17 October and were intercepted by a British force of two light cruisers and five destroyers. The British opened fire at extreme range and were forced to disengage in the face of long-range torpedo volleys and attacks by Luftwaffe bombers without having hit any of the German ships. Ihn returned home on 7 November for a refit in Stettin.

Her refit was completed in late January 1941, but she was trapped by thick ice so that she could not reach Gotenhafen to work up until mid-February. Ihn returned to France in April where she was based at La Pallice. There she was primarily occupied with escorting returning commerce raiders, warships and supply ships through the Bay of Biscay to bases in France. These included the raider Thor on 22 April, the supply ship Nordland, and the fleet oiler Ermland in late May. The heavy cruiser Prinz Eugen was escorted to Brest in early June after separating from the battleship Bismarck during Operation Rheinübung. Ihn sailed from Brest on 27 July for another refit and was ineffectually attacked by British motor torpedo boats (MTB) off Calais that same day.

=== 1942 ===
The ship remained in German waters for the rest of the year after completing her refit. She was sent to Brest in February 1942 to escort the battleships Gneisenau and Scharnhorst, as well as Prinz Eugen through the English Channel back to Germany (Operation Cerberus). During the voyage, Ihn twice engaged British MTBs and shot down two Fairey Swordfish torpedo bombers. Shortly afterwards, the ship joined four other destroyers in escorting Prinz Eugen and the heavy cruiser Admiral Scheer to Trondheim, Norway. Heavy weather forced Ihn and two other destroyers to return to port before reaching Trondheim and Prinz Eugen was badly damaged by a British submarine after their separation.

On 6 March, the battleship Tirpitz, escorted by Ihn and three other destroyers, sortied to attack the returning Convoy QP 8 and the Russia-bound PQ 12 as part of Operation Sportpalast (Sports Palace). That night the weather worsened and Ihn suffered some damage to her bridge and forward gun mount from high waves. The following morning, Admiral Otto Ciliax, commanding the operation, ordered the destroyers to search independently for Allied ships and they stumbled across the 2,815 GRT Soviet freighter SS Ijora, a straggler from QP 8 later that afternoon and sank her. Tirpitz rejoined them shortly afterwards and Ciliax ordered Ihn to Harstad to refuel. The destroyer rejoined the battleship in the morning and was able to shoot down one of five Fairey Albacore torpedo bombers from the aircraft carrier HMS Victorious that unsuccessfully attacked the German ships at 10:20. Two hours later both ships arrived back in port.

By May, Ihn was flagship of Captain Fritz Berger of the 5th Destroyer Flotilla and she was assigned to escort Tirpitz during Operation Rösselsprung (Knight's Move), the attack on the Russia-bound Convoy PQ 17. The ships sailed from Trondheim on 2 July for the first stage of the operation, although all three of the other destroyers assigned to Tirpitz's escort ran aground in the dark and heavy fog and were forced to return to port for repairs. Tirpitz, the heavy cruiser Admiral Hipper and Ihn arrived at Altafjord on 4 July, but they were recalled shortly after sortieing on the 5th and never engaged any Allied ships. She escorted Galster, one of the destroyers that had run aground, back to Germany on 12 July.

=== 1943–1945 ===
Ihn was refitted after her arrival and remained in the Baltic Sea for the rest of the year. On 9 January 1943, together with two other destroyers, she escorted Scharnhorst and Prinz Eugen as they attempted to return to Norway from Gotenhafen. The ships were spotted en route two days later by an aircraft from the Royal Air Force and the attempt was abandoned as the element of surprise was lost. Another attempt was made in March, although just with Scharnhorst, and Ihn joined her escort off Kristiansand, Norway, on 7 March. Heavy weather forced the destroyer to put into Bergen, Norway, although the battleship reached Trondheim. Ihn was transferred to Narvik, Norway at the end of April, although the shortage of fuel severely limited her activities in the Arctic. She was ordered home to refit in November, a lengthy one that lasted until June 1944. She was then stationed at Horten, Norway for the rest of the year, where she was employed on convoy escort and minelaying duties, mainly in the Skagerrak. The ship received a brief refit at Swinemünde in November that augmented her anti-aircraft armament and returned to Horten where she remained until May 1945. On 5 May, Ihn sailed from Denmark to Hela where she loaded refugees that she ferried to Copenhagen the following day. She immediately turned around and returned to Hela for another load that she delivered to Glücksburg, Germany, on the 8th. She surrendered at Flensburg by the next day.

=== Post-War ===
The ship was moved to Wilhelmshaven over the summer under British control while the division of the surviving warships was decided among the victorious Allies. While this was being argued the ships were overhauled with a small maintenance crew aboard to preserve their value. The Allied Tripartite Commission allocated Ihn to the Soviet Union at the end of 1945. By this time she had developed some problems with her boilers and the British proposed to swap her for Theodor Reidel to avoid forcing the Soviets to wait for her to be repaired. They refused and Ihn was repaired more quickly than had been estimated with additional spare boiler parts loaded aboard for the voyage. Commissioned into the Soviet Navy as Prytky (Russian: Прыткий), the ship served in the Baltic fleet until she was struck from the list on 22 March 1952 and sold for scrap.
