= Gruppenhorchgerät =

Hydrophone array used on Nazi Germany's U-boats in World War II

The Gruppenhorchgerät ('group listening device', abbreviated GHG) was a hydrophone array which was used on vessels of the German Kriegsmarine in World War II.

== Development ==
In World War I carbon microphones were still used as sound receivers. The individual receivers were mostly placed in the front part of the vessel along the hull sides to have enough distance from the screw and the noise they emitted. The individual microphones were arranged in groups and each was oriented in a different direction. The individual microphones had to be connected manually to take bearings. They were not very reliable, so other transducers were experimented with. Dynamic microphones were also discarded. At the end of the process, the piezoelectric principle was deemed the most suitable. This was discovered by Pierre Curie in 1880. The quartz crystals generate electric voltage depending on the pressure acting on it.

In collaboration with the Imperial German Navy, Atlas Werke AG in Bremen and Electroacustik (ELAC) in Kiel worked on piezoelectric transducers and the development of detectors and amplifiers in general. They experimented with different kinds of crystals, or combinations of several of them. The best result rendered the Seignette crystal, which is formed from a mixture of different salts. From 1935 crystal receivers were permanently installed on all German submarines. Modern submarines still use electrostriction and barium titanate converters today.

== U-Boat Group listening device ==
The GHG for U-boats consisted of two groups of 24 sensors (one group on each side of the ship). Each sensor had a tube preamplifier. These 48 low frequency signals were then routed to a switching matrix in the main unit. The sonar operator could determine the ship's side and the exact direction of the sound source. To improve the resolution, there were three switchable high-pass filters with 1, 3 and 6 kHz cutoff frequency (and a bypass without filtering). A disadvantage of the side mounting was a dead zone of 40 ° to fore and aft.

Each hydrophone had its own tube amplifier, with input either direct or through a coupling transformer. The amplifier outputs were switchable on/off, and connected to wipers on a wheel, with positions mirroring the positions of the hydrophones on the hull. The wipers then were in contact with an array of parallel strips, connected to a portion of an electrical analog delay line, a linear array of capacitors and inductors. The angle of the wheel selected the delays applied to each hydrophone signal, superimposing them with the delays from speed of sound in water. The operator then switched on/off the relevant hydrophones, rotated wheel until the interferences maximized (the signal of the target was loudest). The position on the goniometer coupled to the wheel then shown the azimuth towards the target. The output of the delay line was connected to a tube preamplifier, fed into a filter stage. The selectable filters allowed listening to different frequencies (low for longer distance, high for precision aiming). The output was then further amplified for a set of headphones or a speaker. The assembly acted effectively as electronically steered phased array.

- Range: 20 km to individual ships, 100 km against Convoy
- Search area: 2 × 140 °
- Resolution:
  - <1 ° at 6 kHz
  - 1.5 ° for 3 kHz
  - 4 ° for 1 kHz
  - 8 ° without filter

In August 1941 U 570 was captured by the British Royal Navy. Only in May 1942 the submarine’s ELAC equipment was thoroughly analyzed; the above resolution values were determined.

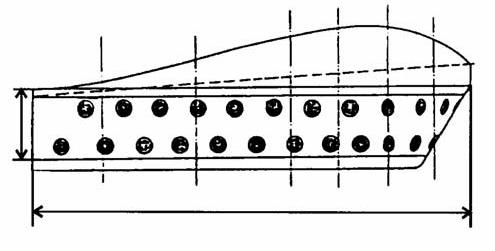
Technical diagram of a Balkongerät

=== Balkongerät ===
The GHG could not be used while cruising on the surface, nor effectively at periscope depth. The optimum operating modus was at a depth below 20 meter with a reduced speed of less than 3 knots. To solve this, a new listening device, known as Balkongerät ('balcony-device') was developed. It was mounted at the front and the bottom of a submarine, so it had less interference from surface noise. There was however now a dead zone towards the rear of the submarine. The Balkongerät was successfully tested on U-194 in January 1943. It was installed on some small Type VII submarines and was standard on the new large Type XXI submarine

== Surface ship Group listening device ==
German Capital ships were equipped with the GHG typ 57 manufactured by Atlas, Bremen. It consisted of 60 crystal microphones and had a typical range of between four and six kilometers, although in most favourable circumstances a range of 40 kilometers was possible.

== See also ==
- Die Sonaranlagen der deutschen U-Boote, Entwicklung, Erprobung, Einsatz und Wirkung akustischer Ortungs- und Täuschungseinrichtungen der deutschen Unterseeboote. Bernard & Graefe, September 2006, ISBN 3-7637-6272-8
- Eberhard Rössler: Die deutschen U-Boote und ihre Werften. Bernard & Graefe, 1990, ISBN 3-7637-5879-8
- Heinrich Stenzel: Leitfaden zur Berechnung von Schallvorgängen. Holt, 1947 Seiten 678–679
- Willem Hackmann: Seek & Strike Sonar, anti-submarine warfare and the Royal Navy 1914–54. Science Museum, London 1984, ISBN 0-1129-0423-8
- Holt, L. E. (1947). "The German Use of Sonic Listening in World War II". The Journal of the Acoustical Society of America. 19 (4). Acoustical Society of America (ASA): 725. Bibcode:1947ASAJ...19R.725H. doi:10.1121/1.1916561. ISSN 0001-4966.
- Eberhard Rössler: Die Sonaranlagen der deutschen Unterseeboote. Koehler, Herford, 1991, 2. Auflage, ISBN 3-7637-6272-8
- Beschreibung einer K.D.B.-Anlage für Oberflächenschiffe, Atlas-Werke Aktiengesellschaft (Herausg.), Nr. 472, (K.D.B. = Kristall-Dreh-Basis = Empfängerbasis), Bremen, 1938, Halbleineneinband, Großformat, 49 Seiten, 81 Falttafeln, Anlagen, GEHEIM,
- Verfahren zur Richtungsbestimmung von Schallsignalen, Reichspatentamt, Nr. 320/29 im August 1918
- Über Hörempfindungen im Ultraschallgebiet bei Knochenleitung, Atlas-Werke AG., Bremen 1940
