= Fritz Berger (officer) =

German naval officer (1900–1973)

- Born: 15 April 1900; Allenstein, East Prussia
- Died: 27 June 1973 (aged 73); Bielefeld
- Military career
- Allegiance: German Empire; Weimar Republic (to 1933); Nazi Germany
- Branch: Imperial German Navy; Reichsmarine; Kriegsmarine
- Rank: Kapitän zur See (Captain)
- Commands: 1. Zerstörerflottille; 5. Zerstörerflottille
- Conflicts: World War II: Operation Wikinger; Battles of Narvik
- Awards: Knight's Cross of the Iron Cross

Fritz Hans Wilhelm Berger (15 April 1900 – 27 June 1973) was a German naval officer and Knight's Cross of the Iron Cross recipient during World War II.

== Early life and career ==
Berger was born on 15 April 1900 in Allenstein, present-day Olsztyn in Poland, then in East Prussia within the German Empire. In 1913, he attended the Kadettenanstalt (cadet school) in Potsdam. In August 1914, Berger transferred to the main cadet school at Berlin-Lichterfelde where he graduated in December 1916. (Note: main cadet school—Hauptkadettenschule) On 2 January 1917, he joined the Imperial German Navy, receiving his basic military training at the Naval Academy Mürwik.

Following the Kapp Putsch, Berger fought in the Ruhr uprising from 25 March to 10 April 1920.

On 9 November 1921, Berger became a watch officer on the light cruiser Arcona.

On 1 October 1928, Berger commanded the recommissioned Type 23 torpedo boat Möwe. Möwe had just been upgraded after initial sea trials revealed stability problems. The boat was assigned to the 4th Torpedoboat-Demi-Flotilla and sailed to Ría de Arousa and A Coruña in April/May 1929. (Note: 4th Torpedoboat-Demi-Flotilla——4. Torpedobootshalbflottille) On 22 August, Möwe was decommissioned again and Berger and his crew transferred to the torpedo boat Seeadler. Berger's command of Seeadler ended on 19 October when she was briefly decommissioned again. Berger was then given command of the torpedo boat Falke which he commanded until September 1930. (Note: Dörr only lists Berger's command of Falke which according to this source he commanded from 1 October 1928 to 30 September 1930.)

From 28 September 1935 to 6 October 1937, Berger served as the communication officer on the light cruiser Königsberg. During this assignment, he attended navigation training on the survey vessel Meteor (20 November – 15 December 1935).

On 8 January 1938, Berger became the first commander of the newly commissioned Type 1934A-class destroyer Z8 Bruno Heinemann built for Nazi Germany's Kriegsmarine. In this capacity, Berger participated in fleet parade held on 22 August which was attended by Adolf Hitler and Miklós Horthy, the Regent of Hungary.

== World War II ==
World War II in Europe began on Friday, 1 September 1939, when German forces invaded Poland. Two days earlier, Berger commanding Z8 Bruno Heinemann, accompanied by the destroyers Z14 Friedrich Ihn, Z15 Erich Steinbrinck and Z16 Friedrich Eckoldt began patrolling the eastern Baltic Sea. On this patrol, they intercepted the polish destroyers Grom, Burza and Błyskawica leaving Gdynia before they headed for England. From 1–3 September, Z8 Bruno Heinemann was in blockade position off Hel. On 4 September, Z8 Bruno Heinemann headed to the North Sea before returning to the shipyard at Wilhelmshaven. On 29 September, Z8 Bruno Heinemann on route to the Baltic Sea again came under attack by Royal Air Force Bristol Blenheim bombers, sustaining minor damage.

Berger was appointed chief of the 1. Zerstörerflottille (1st Destroyer Flotilla) on 5 December 1939. From 12 to 13 December, Berger participated in an offensive mine laying operation led by Kapitän zur See Friedrich Bonte. The destroyers Z4 Richard Beitzen, Z8 Bruno Heinemann, Z14 Friedrich Ihn, Z15 Erich Steinbrinck and Z19 Hermann Künne laid mines off Newcastle that sank eleven ships of 18,979 gross register tons (GRT).

From 6 to 7 January 1940, Berger led the German destroyers Z14 Friedrich Ihn, Z15 Erich Steinbrinck and Z16 Friedrich Eckoldt of the 1. Zerstörerflottille in an offensive mine laying operation into the Thames Estuary. The operation resulted in the sinking of HMS Grenville, six merchant vessels totaling 21,617 GRT of Allied shipping, further damaging another ship. From 9 to 10 February, Berger again led destroyers of the 1. Zerstörerflottille in an offensive mine laying operation. His task force consisting of Z3 Max Schultz, Z4 Richard Beitzen and Z16 Friedrich Eckoldt laid mines in the Shipwash area, off Harwich, that sank six ships of 28,496 GRT and damaged another.

From 22 to 23 February, Berger participated in Operation Wikinger. German aerial reconnaissance had reported British fishing trawlers at the Dogger Bank and the six destroyers Z1 Leberecht Maass, Z3 Max Schultz, Z4 Richard Beitzen, Z6 Theodor Riedel, Z13 Erich Koellner and Z16 Friedrich Eckoldt were dispatched under Bonte's command. In addition, the Luftwaffe sent Heinkel He 111 bombers of II. Gruppe (2nd group) of Kampfgeschwader 27 (KG 26–26th Bomber Wing) into the same area. Due to poor inter-service communication and co-operation between the Kriegsmarine and the Luftwaffe, Z1 Leberecht Maass was sunk by friendly fire when she was hit by three bombs and Z3 Max Schultz was sunk by British mines.

Berger, as chief of the 1. Zerstörerflottille, boarded the Z2 Georg Thiele at Bremerhaven on 6 April in preparation for the Norwegian campaign. On 13 April, Berger was wounded in combat when he received to grazing shot to the head. The next day, he formed the Marine-Regiment "Narvik" which was renamed to Marine-Regiment "Berger" on 18 April. The regiment was staffed from surviving sailors of the ten German destroyers lost in the campaign and subordinated to General Eduard Dietl's 3rd Mountain Division. On 4 August, Berger was awarded the Knight's Cross of the Iron Cross (Ritterkreuz des Eisernen Kreuzes) for his actions in the Battles of Narvik.

On 14 August 1940 Berger was appointed chief of the 5. Zerstörerflottille. In this capacity, he led Z5 Paul Jacobi, Z15 Erich Steinbrinck and Z20 Karl Galster on an escort mission for the minelayers Tannenberg, Roland and Cobra laying mines in the southwestern North Sea. Berger participated in Operation Cerberus, also known as the Channel Dash, the breakout of the German ships Scharnhorst, Gneisenau, and Prinz Eugen from Brest on 11–13 February 1942.

Berger was appointed commander of the naval defenses at Trondheim on 7 June 1943. He served in this capacity until 8 May 1945 when he became a prisoner of war. Initially held at Trondheim, Berger was later taken to England. On 9 May 1948, he was released from captivity.

== Later life ==
Berger died on 27 June 1973 at the age of 73 in Bielefeld, West Germany.

== Summary of career ==
=== Awards ===
- Iron Cross (1939)
  - 2nd Class (16 November 1939)
  - 1st Class (15 December 1939)
- Knight's Cross of the Iron Cross on 4 August 1940 as Fregattenkapitän and chief of the 1. Zerstörerflotille

=== Promotions ===
1 September 1917:	Bootsmannsmaat (Boatswain's Mate)
16 November 1917:	Fähnrich zur See (Officer Cadet), without patent
8 July 1918:	Säbel-Fähnrich (Officer Cadet)
30 July 1920:	Leutnant zur See (Second Lieutenant), effective as of 30 July 1920 with a rank age of 30 July 1920
1 April 1923:	Oberleutnant zur See (First Lieutenant), effective as of 1 April 1923 with a rank age of 1 April 1923
1 February 1930:	Kapitänleutnant (Captain Lieutenant), effective as of 1 February 1930 with a rank age of 1 February 1930
1 November 1935:	Korvettenkapitän (Corvette Captain), effective as of 1 November 1935 with a rank age of 1 November 1935
1 August 1939:	Fregattenkapitän (Frigate Captain), effective as of 1 August 1939 with a rank age of 1 August 1939
1 March 1941:	Kapitän zur See (Captain at Sea), effective as of 1 March 1941 with a rank age of 1 March 1941
29 March 1945:	nominated for promotion to Konteradmiral (Counter Admiral)
