= German destroyer Z1 Leberecht Maass =

Type 1934 class destroyer

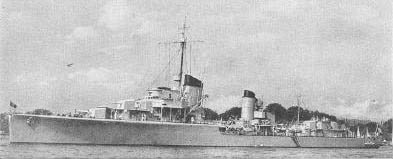
- Z1 Leberecht Maass at anchor

History

Nazi Germany
- Name: Leberecht Maass
- Namesake: Leberecht Maass
- Ordered: 7 July 1934
- Builder: Deutsche Werke, Kiel
- Laid down: 10 October 1934
- Launched: 18 August 1935
- Commissioned: 14 January 1937
- Fate: Sunk by naval mine or bombs, 22 February 1940

General characteristics (as built)
- Class & type: Type 1934-class destroyer
- Displacement: 2,223 long tons (2,259 t) (standard); 3,156 long tons (3,207 t) (deep load)
- Length: 119 m (390 ft 5 in) o/a; 114 m (374 ft 0 in) w/l
- Beam: 11.30 m (37 ft 1 in)
- Draft: 4.23 m (13 ft 11 in)
- Installed power: 70,000 PS (51,000 kW; 69,000 shp); 6 × water-tube boilers
- Propulsion: 2 shafts, 2 × geared steam turbines
- Speed: 36 knots (67 km/h; 41 mph)
- Range: 1,530 nmi (2,830 km; 1,760 mi) at 19 knots (35 km/h; 22 mph)
- Complement: 325
- Armament: 5 × single 12.7 cm (5 in) guns; 2 × twin 3.7 cm (1.5 in) AA guns; 6 × single 2 cm (0.8 in) AA guns; 2 × quadruple 53.3 cm (21 in) torpedo tubes; 60 mines; 4 depth charge throwers and 6 individual racks for 32–64 depth charges

The German destroyer Z1 Leberecht Maass was the lead ship of her class of four destroyers built for the German Navy (initially called the Reichsmarine and then renamed as the Kriegsmarine in 1935) during the mid-1930s. Completed in 1937, two years before the start of World War II, the ship served as a flagship and spent most of her time training, although she did participate in the occupation of Memel in early 1939.

Several days after the start of the German Invasion of Poland in September 1939, Z1 Leberecht Maass and another destroyer unsuccessfully attacked Polish ships in the naval base on the Hel Peninsula. She was lightly damaged during the action. In mid-February 1940, while proceeding into the North Sea to attack British fishing trawlers (Operation Wikinger), the ship was bombed by a patrolling German bomber that damaged her steering. Following the attack, Z1 Leberecht Maass broke in half and sank with the loss of most of her crew. A court of inquiry convened during the war determined that she and a sister ship were hit by bombs, but a post-war investigation determined that she had drifted into a newly laid British minefield.

== Design and description ==
Design work on the Type 34-class destroyers began in 1932, despite the 800-long-ton (810 t) limit imposed by the Versailles Treaty that had ended World War I. Initial designs were for large ships more powerful than the French and Polish destroyers then in service, but the design grew as the Reichsmarine now expected it to serve as a small cruiser. The design work appears to have been rushed and not well-thought out as the short forecastle and lack of flare at the bow compromised the ships' seakeeping ability and their stability was inadequate. The only real innovative part of the design, the high-pressure boilers, were an over-complicated system that received almost no shipboard testing before being installed in the Type 34s and frequently broke down throughout the life of the ships.

The class had an overall length of 119 meters (390 ft 5 in) and were 114 meters (374 ft 0 in) long at the waterline. The ships had a beam of 11.30 meters (37 ft 1 in), and a maximum draft of 4.23 meters (13 ft 11 in). They displaced 2,223 long tons (2,259 t) at standard load and 3,156 long tons (3,207 t) at deep load. The two Wagner geared steam turbine sets, each driving one propeller shaft, were designed to produce 70,000 PS (51,000 kW; 69,000 shp) using steam provided by six Wagner boilers. The ships had a designed speed of 36 knots (67 km/h; 41 mph), but their maximum speed was 38.7 knots (71.7 km/h; 44.5 mph). The Type 34s carried a maximum of 752 metric tons (740 long tons) of fuel oil which was intended to give a range of 4,400 nautical miles (8,100 km; 5,100 mi) at a speed of 19 knots (35 km/h; 22 mph), but they proved top-heavy in service and 30% of the fuel had to be retained as ballast low in the ship. The effective range proved to be only 1,530 nmi (2,830 km; 1,760 mi) at 19 knots. The crew of the Type 34 class ships numbered 10 officers and 315 enlisted men, plus an additional four officers and 19 enlisted men if serving as a flotilla flagship.

The Type 34s carried five 12.7-centimeter (5.0 in) SK C/34 guns in single mounts with gun shields, two each superimposed, fore and aft. The fifth gun was carried on top of the aft superstructure. The guns were numbered from one to five from front to rear. Their anti-aircraft armament consisted of four 3.7-centimeter (1.5 in) SK C/30 guns in a pair of twin mounts abreast the rear funnel and six 2-centimeter (0.79 in) C/30 guns in single mounts. The ships carried eight 53.3-centimeter (21 in) torpedo tubes in two power-operated mounts. A pair of reload torpedoes was provided for each mount. Leberecht Maass had four depth charge launchers mounted on the sides of her rear deckhouse, which was supplemented by six racks for individual depth charges on the sides of the stern, with either 32 or 64 charges carried. Mine rails could be fitted on the rear deck that had a maximum capacity of 60 mines. A system of passive hydrophones designated as 'GHG' (Gruppenhorchgerät) was fitted to detect submarines.

== Construction and career ==
Z1 Leberecht Maass, named after Rear Admiral (Konteradmiral) Leberecht Maass, who was killed while commanding German forces in the Battle of Heligoland Bight in August 1914, was the first destroyer to be built in Germany since World War I. She was ordered on 7 July 1934 and laid down at Deutsche Werke, Kiel, on 10 October 1934 as yard number K232. The ship was launched on 18 August 1935 and completed on 14 January 1937, under the command of Lieutenant Commander (Korvettenkapitän) Friedrich T. Schmidt.

As the first ship of her class to be completed, Leberecht Maass became the flagship of the Leader of Torpedo-boats (Führer der Torpedoboote (FdT)) on 1 May and spent much of her first year training in the eastern Baltic Sea, before making a port visit in Gothenburg, Sweden, in early April 1938. Upon her return, the ship was turned over to her builders to have her bow rebuilt to fix the large amount of water that came over it in head seas. The ship then participated in the August 1938 Fleet Review and the following fleet exercise. Korvettenkapitän Gerhard Wagner relieved Schmidt in October. In December, Leberecht Maass, together with her sisters Z2 Georg Thiele, Z3 Max Schultz, and Z4 Richard Beitzen, sailed to the area of Iceland to evaluate her seaworthiness in a North Atlantic winter with her new bow. On 23–24 March 1939, the ship was one of the destroyers that escorted Adolf Hitler aboard the heavy cruiser Deutschland to occupy Memel. Korvettenkapitän Fritz Bassenge assumed command of Leberecht Maass the following month. Afterwards, she participated in the fleet exercise in the western Mediterranean, as the flagship of Konteradmiral Günther Lütjens, and visited Ceuta and Ría de Arousa in Spain before departing for Germany on 13 May.

The initial task of the Kriegsmarine when Hitler declared war on Poland on 1 September was to blockade the Polish coast. As such, they deployed three light cruisers and ten destroyers, including Leberecht Maass, to accomplish this mission. Leberecht Maass evaded an attack by the submarine ORP Wilk on the first day of the war. It later became quickly apparent that the Kriegsmarine had deployed too many ships off the Polish coast, and so the cruisers were withdrawn. Two days later, the ship and Z9 Wolfgang Zenker were ordered to investigate the ships in the naval base at Hel. They spotted the Polish destroyer Wicher and the minelayer Gryf and engaged both ships at a range around 12,700 meters (13,900 yd). German fire was ineffective, but the Polish return fire was more accurate and forced the German destroyers to make evasive maneuvers and to lay a smoke screen to throw off the aim of the Polish gunners. Leberecht Maass was hit by a 152-millimeter (6.0 in) shell from the Heliodor Laskowski's battery defending the base at 06:57, which knocked out power to No. 2 gun, disabled its shell hoists, killed four crewmen and wounded another four. The ship fired 77 rounds of 12.7 cm ammunition during the battle. The following day, she sailed to Swinemünde to have her damage repaired, a process that took until 10 September as it included repairs to the ship's boiler tubes. After its completion, Leberecht Maass helped to lay defensive minefields in the North Sea and Lütjens transferred his flag to Z21 Wilhelm Heidkamp, the ship being assigned to the 2nd Destroyer Flotilla (2. Zerstörer Flotille). She began a previously scheduled refit in Swinemünde on 29 September and was again the flagship of the FdT by 30 November, but rejoined 2. Zerstörerflotille on 22 December.

In retaliation for the Altmark Incident where the Royal Navy liberated captured British sailors from the German tanker Altmark in neutral Norwegian waters on 16 February 1940, the Kriegsmarine organized Operation Nordmark to search for Allied merchant ships in the North Sea as far north as the Shetland Islands. 2. Zerstörerflotille, including Leberecht Maass, escorted the battleships Scharnhorst and Gneisenau as well as the heavy cruiser Admiral Hipper during the initial stage of the sortie on 18 February, but Leberecht Maass and Z5 Paul Jacobi were detached the following day on an unsuccessful search for enemy shipping in the Skagerrak.

A few days later, the Kriegsmarine planned Operation Wikinger in cooperation with the Luftwaffe in the erroneous belief that the British fishing trawlers off the Dogger Bank were cooperating with submarines. They believed that sinking or capturing the trawlers would force the British to spread themselves thin to defend the fishing fleet and might result in some useful auxiliary ships for the Kriegsmarine. The Luftwaffe promised fighter cover for the ships engaged in the operation as well as bomber support.

Loaded with prize crews, Leberecht Maass and five other destroyers, Max Schultz, Richard Beitzen, Z6 Theodor Riedel, Z13 Erich Koellner and Z16 Friedrich Eckoldt, sailed on 22 February. En route, the flotilla was mistakenly attacked by a Heinkel He 111 bomber from Kampfgeschwader 26. Leberecht Maass was hit by at least one bomb, lost her steering, and broke in half, sinking with the loss of 280 of her crew, including the ship's captain. Only 60 of her crew were saved. (Note: Koop and Schmolke give a figure of 282 men lost.) During the rescue effort, Max Schultz hit a mine and sank with the loss of her entire crew. Hitler ordered a court of inquiry to be convened to investigate the cause of the losses and it concluded that both ships had been sunk by bombs from the He 111. The Kriegsmarine had failed to notify its destroyers that the Luftwaffe was making anti-shipping patrols at that time and had also failed to inform the Luftwaffe that its destroyers would be at sea. Postwar research revealed that one or both ships may have struck a British minefield laid by the destroyers Ivanhoe and Intrepid.
