= German destroyer Z2 Georg Thiele =

Type 1934 class destroyer

Coordinates: 68°24′29.67″N 17°48′41.62″E

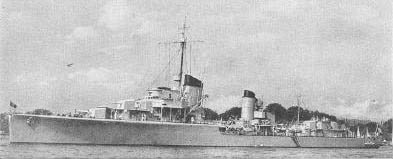
- Sister ship Z1 Leberecht Maass

History

Germany
- Name: Z2 Georg Thiele
- Namesake: Georg Thiele
- Ordered: 7 July 1934
- Builder: Deutsche Werke, Kiel
- Laid down: 25 October 1934
- Launched: 18 August 1935
- Commissioned: 27 February 1937
- Identification: Z2
- Fate: Beached, 13 April 1940

General characteristics (as built)
- Class & type: Type 1934-class destroyer
- Displacement: 2,223 long tons (2,259 t) (standard)
- Length: 119 m (390 ft 5 in) o/a
- Beam: 11.30 m (37 ft 1 in)
- Draft: 4.23 m (13 ft 11 in)
- Installed power: 6 × water-tube boilers; 70,000 PS (51,000 kW; 69,000 shp)
- Propulsion: 2 shafts, 2 × geared steam turbines
- Speed: 36 knots (67 km/h; 41 mph)
- Range: 1,530 nmi (2,830 km; 1,760 mi) at 19 knots (35 km/h; 22 mph)
- Complement: 325
- Armament: 5 × single 12.7 cm (5 in) guns; 2 × twin 3.7 cm (1.5 in) AA guns; 6 × single 2 cm (0.8 in) AA guns; 2 × quadruple 53.3 cm (21 in) torpedo tubes; 60 mines; 4 depth charge throwers and 6 individual racks; 32–64 depth charges

The German destroyer Z2 Georg Thiele was one of four Type 1934-class destroyers built for the German Navy (Kriegsmarine) during the mid-1930s. Completed in 1937, two years before the start of World War II, the ship spent most of her time training although she did participate in the occupation of Memel in early 1939.

At the beginning of World War II, the ship was initially deployed to blockade the Polish coast, but she was quickly transferred to the German Bight to lay minefields in German waters. During the early stages of the Norwegian Campaign, in April 1940, Z2 Georg Thiele fought in both naval Battles of Narvik, on 10 and 13 April, and had to be beached to allow her crew to abandon ship safely after she had been severely damaged by British fire. The ship, having broken up, is now a popular diving site.

== Design and description ==
Design work on the Type 34-class destroyers began in 1932, around the time that Weimar Germany renounced the armament limitations of the Versailles Treaty that had ended World War I. Initial designs for the new destroyers were for large ships more powerful than the French and Polish destroyers then in service, but the design grew further as the Kriegsmarine now expected it to serve as a small cruiser. The design work appears to have been rushed and not well-thought out as the short forecastle and lack of flare at the bow compromised the ships' seakeeping ability and their stability was inadequate. The only substantial innovative part of the design, the high-pressure boilers, were an over-complicated system that received almost no shipboard testing before being installed in the Type 34s and frequently broke down throughout the life of the ships.

The class had an overall length of 119 meters (390 ft 5 in) and were 114 meters (374 ft 0 in) long at the waterline. The ships had a beam of 11.30 meters (37 ft 1 in), and a maximum draft of 4.23 meters (13 ft 11 in). They displaced 2,223 long tons (2,259 t) at standard load and 3,156 long tons (3,207 t) at deep load. The two Wagner geared steam turbine sets, each driving one propeller shaft, were designed to produce 70,000 PS (51,000 kW; 69,000 shp) using steam provided by six Wagner boilers. The ships had a designed speed of 36 knots (67 km/h; 41 mph), but attained an actual maximum speed of 38.7 knots (71.7 km/h; 44.5 mph). The Type 34s carried a maximum of 752 metric tons (740 long tons) of fuel oil which was intended to give a range of 4,400 nautical miles (8,100 km; 5,100 mi) at a speed of 19 knots (35 km/h; 22 mph), but they proved top-heavy in service and 30% of the fuel had to be retained as ballast low in the ship; the effective range proved to be only 1,530 nmi (2,830 km; 1,760 mi) at 19 knots. The crew of the Type 34 class ships numbered 10 officers and 315 enlisted men, plus an additional four officers and 19 enlisted men if serving as a flotilla flagship.

The Type 34s carried five 12.7-centimeter (5 in) SK C/34 guns in single mounts with gun shields, two each superimposed, fore and aft. The fifth gun was carried on top of the aft superstructure. The guns were numbered from one to five from front to rear. Their anti-aircraft armament consisted of four 3.7-centimeter (1.5 in) SK C/30 guns in a pair of twin mounts abreast the rear funnel and six 2-centimeter (0.79 in) C/30 guns in single mounts. The ships carried eight 53.3-centimeter (21 in) torpedo tubes in two power-operated mounts. A pair of reload torpedoes was provided for each mount.

Georg Thiele had four depth charge throwers mounted on the sides of her rear deckhouse, which were supplemented by six racks for individual depth charges on the sides of the stern, with either 32 or 64 charges carried. Mine rails could be fitted on the rear deck, with a maximum capacity of 60 mines. A system of passive hydrophones designated as 'GHG' (Gruppenhorchgerät) was fitted to detect submarines.

== Construction and career ==
Z2 Georg Thiele was ordered on 7 July 1934 and laid down at Deutsche Werke, Kiel, on 25 October 1934 as yard number K243. She was launched on 18 August 1935, and completed and commissioned on 27 February 1937. She was named after Georg Thiele, a Korvettenkapitän who commanded the Seventh Half Flotilla of torpedo boats during World War I. She was assigned to the 1st Destroyer Division on 1 December 1937 and made a port visit to Ulvik, Norway, in April 1938, together with her sisters Z3 Max Schultz and Z4 Richard Beitzen. She was then handed back to her builders to have her bow rebuilt to fix the damage caused by the large amount of water that came over it in head seas. This increased her length by .30 meters (1 ft 0 in). She then participated in the 22 August Fleet Review for Adolf Hitler and Miklós Horthy, Regent of the Kingdom of Hungary, and the following fleet exercise. In December, Georg Thiele, together with her sisters Z1 Leberecht Maass, Max Schultz, and Richard Beitzen, sailed to the area of Iceland to evaluate their seaworthiness in a North Atlantic winter with their new bows. On 23–24 March 1939, she was one of the destroyers that escorted the heavy cruiser Deutschland, which was transporting Adolf Hitler to announce the occupation of Memel. She participated in the spring fleet exercise in the western Mediterranean and made several visits to Spanish and Moroccan ports in April and May. When World War II began, Georg Thiele was initially deployed in the Baltic to operate against the Polish Navy and to enforce a blockade of Poland, but she was soon transferred to the German Bight where she joined her sisters in laying defensive minefields. The ship began a refit in late 1939 that was completed in early April 1940.

=== Norwegian Campaign ===
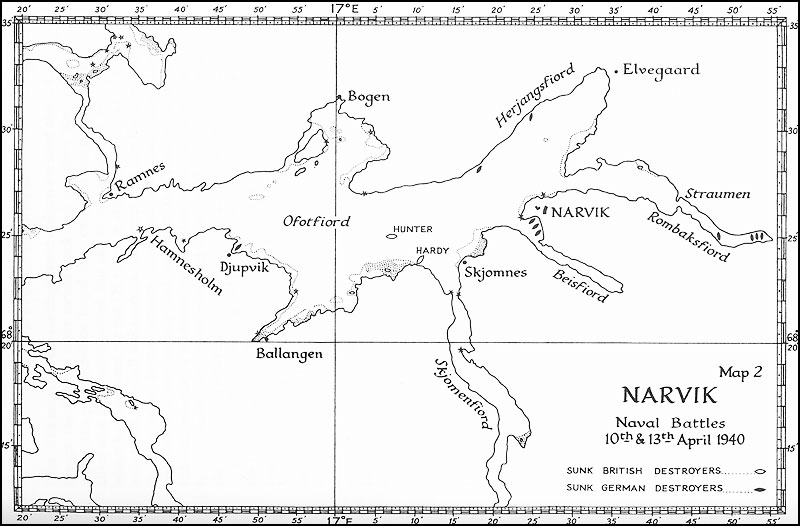
A map of the Ofotfjord

Georg Thiele was allocated to Group 1 for the Norwegian portion of Operation Weserübung in April 1940. The group's task was to transport the 139th Mountain Infantry Regiment (139. Gebirgsjäger Regiment) and the headquarters of the 3rd Mountain Division (3. Gebirgs-Division) to seize Narvik. The ships began loading troops on 6 April and set sail the next day. The German destroyers reached the Ofotfjord on the morning of 9 April and Commodore Friedrich Bonte took his flagship Wilhelm Heidkamp, Georg Thiele and Z11 Bernd von Arnim down the fjord to Narvik. A heavy snowstorm allowed Thiele and von Arnim to enter the harbor without challenge and tie up at a pier. The mountain troops immediately began disembarking, but the ships were spotted by the coast defense ship Norge a few minutes later. The latter ship immediately opened fire and was able to fire approximately thirteen 21 cm (8.3 in) shells at a range of 600–800 meters (660–870 yd) before von Arnim sank the Norwegian ship with torpedoes. In the darkness and falling snow, none of the Norwegian shells hit either of the two destroyers, despite the short range.

Thiele and von Arnim were the first ships to refuel from the single tanker that had made it safely to Narvik and later moved to the Ballangenfjord, a southern arm of the Ofotfjord, closer to the entrance. Shortly before dawn on 10 April, the five destroyers of the British 2nd Destroyer Flotilla, Hardy, Havock, Hunter, Hotspur, and Hero, surprised the five German destroyers in Narvik harbor. They torpedoed two destroyers and badly damaged the other three while suffering only minor damage themselves. As they were beginning to withdraw they encountered the three destroyers of the 4th Flotilla which had been alerted in the Herjangsfjord when the British began their attack. The Germans opened fire first, but the gunnery for both sides was not effective due to the mist and the smoke screen laid by the British as they retreated down the Ofotfjord. The German ships had to turn away to avoid a salvo of three torpedoes fired by one of the destroyers in Narvik, but Thiele and von Arnim had also been alerted and were coming up to engage the British.

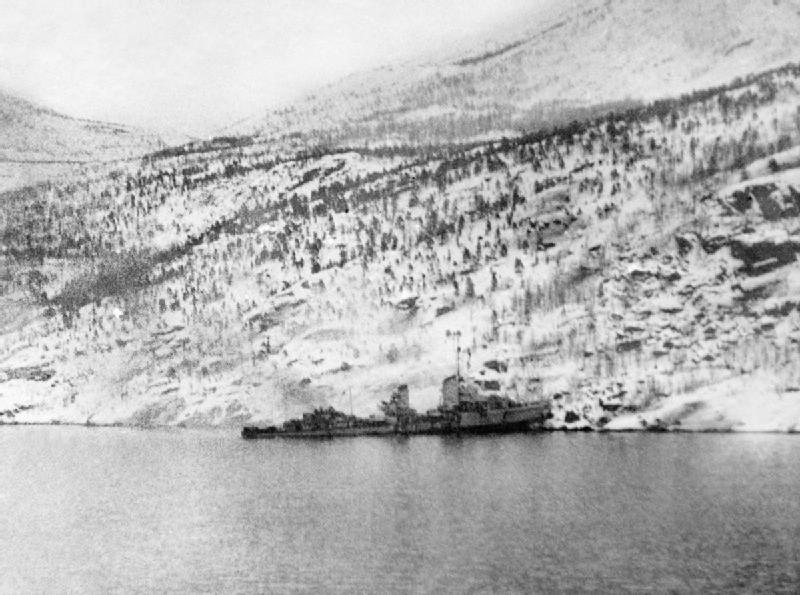
Georg Thiele photographed by a British ship after having been run aground.

The two German destroyers crossed the T of the British flotilla and were able to fire full broadsides at a range of only 4,000 meters (13,000 ft). They first engaged the British flagship, Hardy, and badly damaged her. Both of her forward guns were knocked out and the forward superstructure was set afire. Hardy was forced to beach herself lest she sink, and the German ships switched their fire to Havock, the next ship in line. Their fire was relatively ineffective, and both sides fired torpedoes without scoring any hits. Havock pulled out and dropped to the rear to fight off any pursuit by the ships of the 4th Flotilla. This placed Hunter in the lead and she was quickly set on fire by the German ships. Thiele is believed to have hit her with a torpedo and she was rammed from behind by Hotspur when the latter ship lost steering control. Hotspur was able to disengage, but Hunter capsized shortly afterwards. The three remaining British ships were able to escape from the Germans under the cover of a smoke screen. Georg Thiele was hit seven times and badly damaged. The British shells knocked out her forward gun and her fire-control equipment, flooded one magazine, started fires, and killed thirteen crewmen.

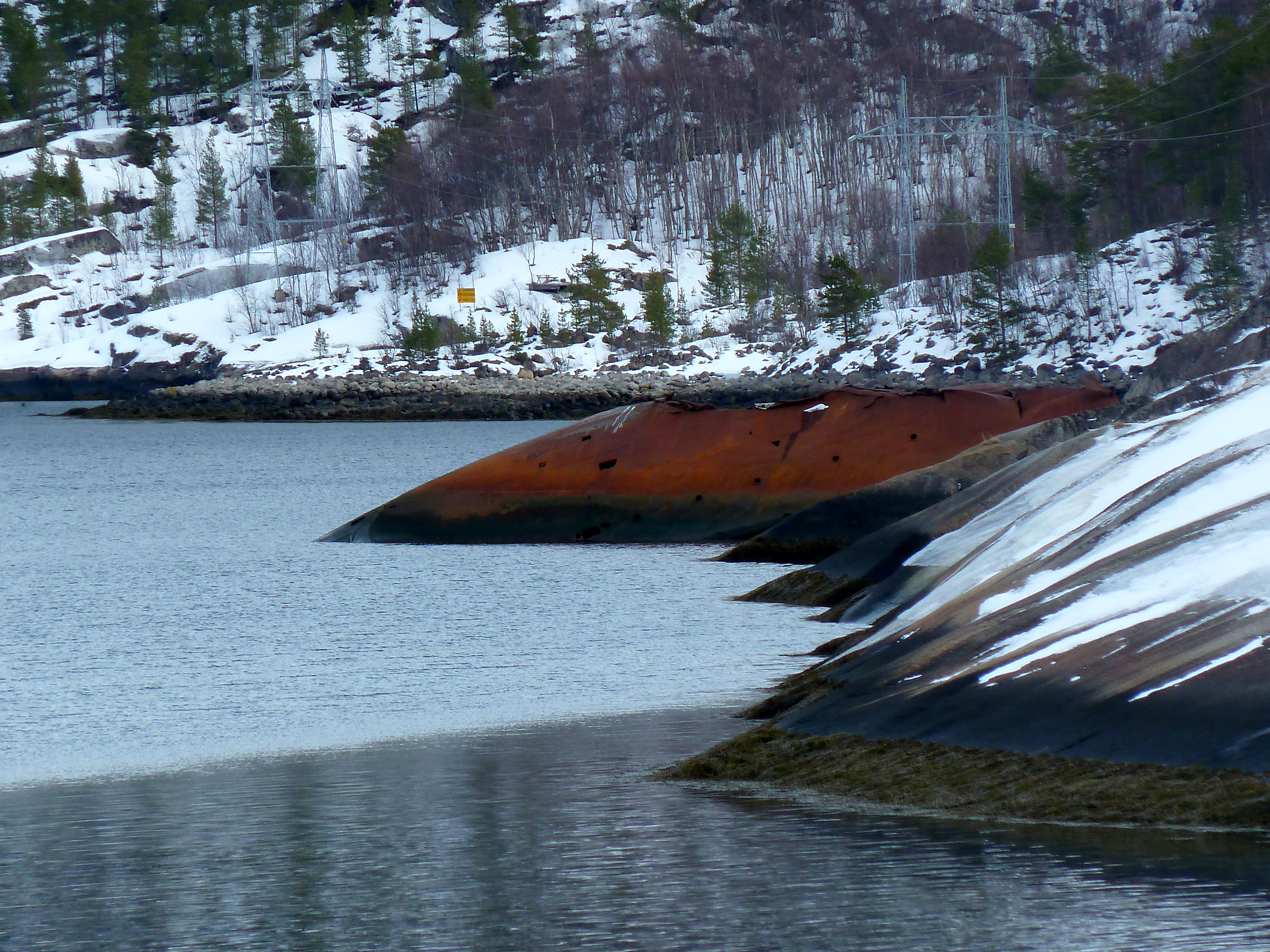
The wreck site in 2012

On the night of 12/13 April, Commander Erich Bey, the senior surviving German officer, received word to expect an attack the following day by British capital ships escorted by a large number of destroyers and supported by carrier aircraft. Thiele, still under repair, had only four usable guns by this time and six remaining torpedoes. The battleship Warspite and nine destroyers appeared on 13 April, earlier than Bey had expected, and caught the Germans out of position. The five operable destroyers, including Thiele, charged out of Narvik harbor and engaged the British ships without much success. Lack of ammunition forced the German ships to retreat to the Rombaksfjorden (the easternmost branch of the Ofotfjord), east of Narvik, where they might attempt to ambush pursuing British destroyers. Thiele still had some ammunition and torpedoes left, and took up position at the Straumen narrows with Z18 Hans Lüdemann to give the remaining two destroyers time to scuttle themselves at the head of the fjord. The pursuing British destroyers initially engaged Lüdemann, until the ship retreated to the head of the fjord after exhausting all of its ammunition. The British destroyers then switched their attentions to Thiele. The German ship struck the first blow when one of her torpedoes blew the bow off Eskimo, but the return fire from the British ships started several fires and damaged her so heavily that Korvettenkapitän Max-Eckart Wolff, the ship's captain, ordered her run aground to allow her crew to abandon ship safely. Fourteen men were killed during the battle and another 28 wounded.

The surviving crew of the ship took part in the land fighting at Narvik in the following weeks. Wolff served as a battalion commander in the Marine-Regiment Berger, named after its commander Fritz Berger, during the land battle. He was awarded the Iron Cross First Class on 12 May 1940 and the Knight's Cross of the Iron Cross the following August for his command of Thiele at Narvik. The ship later broke in two and capsized.

Today, the wreck is one of the most popular diving sites in Narvik. It also appeared in documentary series Abandoned Engineering, season 2 episode 7 Germany's Lost Warship.
