= Type 1934 destroyers =

Group of four destroyers in the German Navy

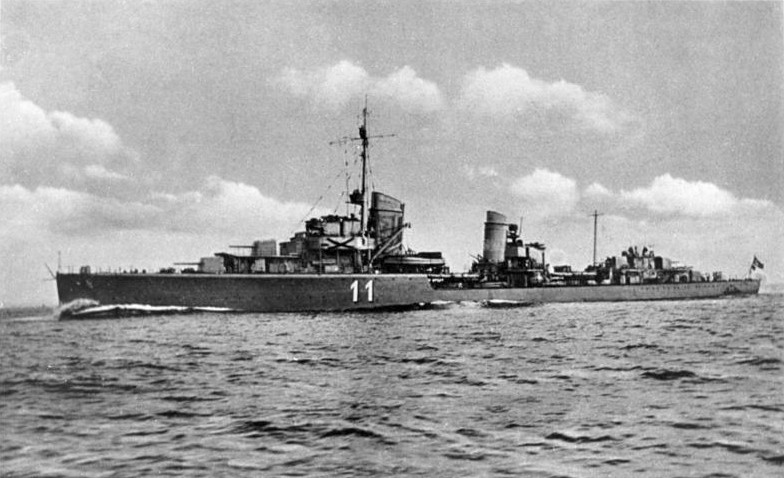
- Z4 Richard Beitzen, 1937

Class overview
- Name: Type 1934 destroyer
- Builders: Deutsche Werke
- Operators: Kriegsmarine
- Succeeded by: Type 1934A destroyer
- Cost: 54,749,000 marks
- Built: 1934–1937
- In service: 1937–1947
- Completed: 4
- Lost: 3
- Scrapped: 1

General characteristics
- Type: Destroyer
- Displacement: 2,223 long tons (2,259 t) (Standard load); 3,156 long tons (3,207 t) (Full load)
- Length: 114 m (374 ft) (p.p.); 116.25 m (381 ft 5 in) (at waterline); 119 m (390 ft 5 in) (overall)
- Beam: 11.31 m (37 ft 1 in)
- Draft: 4.23 m (13 ft 11 in) (full load)
- Installed power: 70,000 PS (51,000 kW; 69,000 shp); 6 × water-tube boilers
- Propulsion: 2 × shafts, 2 × geared steam turbines
- Speed: 36 knots (67 km/h; 41 mph)
- Range: 1,530 nmi (2,830 km; 1,760 mi) at 19 knots (35 km/h; 22 mph)
- Boats & landing craft carried: 2 × Motor pinnaces; 1 × Torpedo cutter
- Complement: 10 officers, 315 enlisted
- Armament: 5 × 12.7 cm (5 in) guns; 4 × 3.7 cm (1.5 in) AA guns; 6 × 2 cm (0.79 in) AA guns; 2 × quadruple 53.3 cm (21 in) torpedo tubes; 4 × depth charge launchers, 6 × racks; 60 × mines

The Type 1934 destroyers, also known as the Z1 class or Leberecht Maass class after the lead ship, were a group of four destroyers built for the German Navy (initially called the Reichsmarine and then renamed the Kriegsmarine in 1935) during the mid-1930s, shortly before the beginning of World War II. The ships were engaged in training for most of the period between their commissioning and the outbreak of war, although they did participate in the occupation of Memel in Lithuania, in early 1939. Z3 Max Schultz collided with and sank a German torpedo boat shortly before the war began on 1 September 1939. All four ships were named after German officers who had been killed in World War I.

Z1 Leberecht Maass fruitlessly attacked Polish ships during the invasion of Poland while her sister ships Z2 Georg Thiele and Z4 Richard Beitzen briefly blockaded the Polish coast. Later that month, the three sisters helped to lay minefields in the German Bight before they began patrolling the Skagerrak to inspect neutral shipping for contraband goods. Z3 Max Schultz joined them in early October. Z4 Richard Beitzen laid multiple minefields off the British coast in late 1939 and early 1940; she was joined by Max Schultz during one mission off Harwich in 1940.

In February 1940, while en route to attack British fishing boats as part of Operation Wikinger, Z1 Leberecht Maass, Z3 Max Schultz and Z4 Richard Beitzen were accidentally attacked by a Luftwaffe bomber. Z1 Leberecht Maass was struck by one bomb and sank with the loss of most of her crew. While attempting to assist her sister, Z3 Max Schultz struck a mine and sank with the loss of all hands.

Z2 Georg Thiele helped transfer troops to seize Narvik during the invasion of Norway in April and participated in both Battles of Narvik. She was forced to beach herself after she was severely damaged by British destroyers during the second battle. Z4 Richard Beitzen was the only one of the four sisters to survive the war despite several engagements with British destroyers in the English Channel in 1941 and her participation in the Battle of the Barents Sea in late 1942. She spent most of the rest of the war escorting convoys to and from Norway before the end of the war in 1945. Richard Beitzen was turned over to the Royal Navy and scrapped four years later.

== Background ==
Design work on the Type 34-class destroyers began in 1932, despite the 800-long-ton (810 t) limit imposed by the Versailles Treaty that had ended World War I. Initial designs were for large ships more powerful than the French and Polish destroyers then in service, but the design grew as the Reichsmarine now expected it to serve as a small cruiser. The Germans decided that they were going to ignore the restrictions since France and Britain weren't disarming, and an 800-ton destroyer would have been hopelessly outclassed by the destroyers being built by foreign navies. The specifications were finalized in 1934 and the four ships were ordered in July of that year. The design work appears to have been rushed and not well-thought out as the short forecastle and lack of flare at the bow compromised the ships' seakeeping ability and their stability was inadequate. The only real innovative part of the design, the high-pressure boilers, were an over-complicated design that received almost no shipboard testing before being installed in the Type 34s and frequently broke down throughout the life of the ships. By the time the ships were complete, Germany had already signed the Anglo-German Naval Agreement which essentially overturned the naval clauses of the Versailles Treaty and rendered their displacement legal.

== General characteristics ==
Right profile and plan drawings of the Type 34

The Type 1934 destroyers were 114 metres (374 ft) long between perpendiculars, 116.25 m (381 ft 5 in) at waterline, and 119 m (390 ft 5 in) long overall. Designed for a draught of 3.82 m (12 ft 6 in), they had a draught of 4.23 m (13 ft 11 in) at full load and a beam of 11.31 m (37 ft 1 in). Designed to displace 2,578 long tons (2,619 t), they displaced 2,223 long tons (2,259 t) at standard load and 3,156 long tons (3,207 t) at full load. The ships had a metacentric height of 0.79 m (2 ft 7 in) at full load, and 0.6 m (2 ft) at half load. The Type 34s were divided into 15 watertight compartments of which the middle 7 contained the propulsion and auxiliary machinery and were protected by a double bottom over 48% of the ships' length. Active stabilizers were fitted to reduce roll. They had a complement of 10 officers and 315 enlisted men, plus an additional 4 officers and 19 enlisted men if serving as a flotilla flagship, and carried two motor pinnaces and a torpedo cutter.

The Type 1934-class destroyers were propelled by a pair of Wagner geared steam turbine sets, each driving a single three-bladed, 3.25-meter (10 ft 8 in) propeller, using superheated steam provided by six Wagner water-tube boilers that operated at a pressure of 70 atm (1,029 psi; 7,093 kPa) and a temperature of 450 °C (842 °F). The turbines developed a total of 70,000 shaft horsepower (52,000 kW) and were intended to give the ships a designed speed of 36 knots (67 km/h; 41 mph), but they actually had a maximum speed of 38.7 knots (71.7 km/h; 44.5 mph). The Type 34s carried a maximum of 752 metric tons (740 long tons) of fuel oil which was intended to give a range of 4,400 nautical miles (8,100 km; 5,100 mi) at a speed of 19 knots (35 km/h; 22 mph), but they proved top-heavy in service and 30% of the fuel had to be retained as ballast low in the ship. The effective range proved to be only 1,530 nmi (2,830 km; 1,760 mi) at 19 knots. The ships were equipped with two steam-driven 200-kilowatt (270 hp) turbogenerators, one in each engine room, and three diesel generators, two of 60 kW (80 hp) and one of 30 kW (40 hp), in a compartment between the two rear boiler rooms.

The ships were armed with five 12.7 cm (5 in) guns in single mounts with gun shields, two each superimposed, fore and aft of the superstructure. The fifth gun was carried on top of the aft superstructure. They carried 600 rounds of ammunition for these guns, which had a maximum range of 17.4 kilometres (19,000 yd), and could be elevated to 30° and depressed to −10°. Their anti-aircraft armament was made up of four 3.7 cm (1.5 in) anti-aircraft guns in single mounts, with 8,000 rounds of ammunition, and six 2 cm (0.79 in) anti-aircraft guns in single mounts, with 12,000 rounds of ammunition. They also had eight 53.3 cm (21 in) torpedo tubes in two quadruple power-operated mounts on the centreline, with a pair of reloads for each mount. They had four depth charge launchers mounted on the sides of their rear deckhouse, which was supplemented by six racks for individual depth charges on the sides of the stern, with either 32 or 64 charges carried. Mine rails were fitted on the rear deck, with a maximum capacity of 60 mines. They carried a system of passive hydrophones, designated as 'GHG' (Gruppenhorchgerät), to allow them to detect submarines. The four ships cost a total of 54,749,000 marks.

The Type 34s were equipped with a C/34Z analog fire-control director on the roof of the bridge that calculated the gunnery data using range estimates provided by the two 4-meter (13 ft) stereoscopic rangefinders, one abaft the rear funnel and the other just behind the director. It transmitted the bearing and elevation data to the gun crews and then fired the guns simultaneously. A 1.25-meter (4 ft 1 in) rangefinder provided data to the 3.7 cm AA guns while the 2 cm guns used a hand-held 0.7-meter (2 ft 4 in) rangefinder.

=== Modifications ===
After the trials, several changes were made. A staukeil, a short keel that had a shallow wedge-shaped cross-section, was added under their transoms, in order to improve their turning circles and raise their sterns at high speed. This had the effect, however, of forcing the bow deeper into the water which aggravated the lack of sheer forward, throwing spray over the bridge, making No. 1 gun impossible to work and the upper deck hazardous to walk upon. A more serious problem was that it caused a continuous sagging force on the hull which required the reinforcement of the amidships hull plates to prevent cracking. The staukeils were removed in 1940–1942. Around 1938–1939 the four ships had their bows rebuilt with more sheer and a retractable bow spar was installed, which increased their length to 114.4 m (375 ft) between perpendiculars and 119.3 m (391 ft) overall, and the stabilizers were replaced by bilge keels. In addition the upper bridge with its rounded front face was rebuilt into a more squared off shape to increase the space available. To reduce topweight, Richard Beitzen had her funnels reduced in height in 1942.

An active sonar system was scheduled to be installed aboard Richard Beitzen in June 1940, but it is uncertain when it was actually done by this date. During the war, the ship's light anti-aircraft armament was augmented several times. Improved 2 cm C/38 guns replaced the original C/30 guns and three additional guns were added sometime in 1941. The two guns on the aft shelter deck were replaced by a single 2 cm quadruple Flakvierling mount, probably during her late 1941 refit. Richard Beitzen appears not to have any additional AA guns added after this time. After mid-1941, the ship was fitted with a FuMO 24 (Note: Funkmess-Ortung (Radio-direction finder, active ranging)) search radar and later a FuMO 63 K Hohentwiel radar.

== Ships ==
List of Type 1934 destroyers
Ship	Builder	Ordered	Laid down	Launched	Commissioned	Fate
Z1 Leberecht Maass	Deutsche Werke, Kiel	7 April 1934	10 November 1934	18 August 1935	14 January 1937	Sunk by German bombs, 22 February 1940
Z2 Georg Thiele	Deutsche Werke, Kiel	7 April 1934	25 November 1934	18 August 1935	27 February 1937	Beached and destroyed during the Battles of Narvik, 13 April 1940
Z3 Max Schultz	Deutsche Werke, Kiel	7 April 1934	2 January 1935	30 November 1935	8 April 1937	Sunk by mines, 22 February 1940
Z4 Richard Beitzen	Deutsche Werke, Kiel	7 April 1934	7 January 1935	30 November 1935	13 May 1937	Surrendered to the British, 14 May 1945; broken up, 1949

== Service history ==
=== Z1 Leberecht Maass ===
On 3 September 1939, Z1 Leberecht Maass and her fellow destroyer Z9 Wolfgang Zenker attacked the Polish destroyer Wicher and minelayer Gryf in Gdynia harbour with little effect. During this battle, she was damaged and sailed to Swinemünde for repairs. After this, she helped to lay defensive minefields in the North Sea. On 22 February 1940, while taking part in Operation Wikinger, she was attacked in error by a Heinkel He 111 bomber that hit her with at least one bomb, damaging her steering; the Kriegsmarine had failed to notify its destroyers that the Luftwaffe was carrying out anti-shipping patrols at that time, and had also failed to inform the Luftwaffe that its destroyers would be at sea. A court of inquiry convened during the war determined that she and Z3 Max Schultz were hit by bombs, but a post-war investigation determined that they had drifted into a newly laid British minefield.

=== Z2 Georg Thiele ===
When World War II began, Z2 Georg Thiele was initially deployed in the Baltic to operate against the Polish Navy and to enforce a blockade of Poland, but she was soon transferred to the German Bight where she joined her sisters in laying defensive minefields. She helped to transport troops to Narvik during the invasion of Norway in April 1940. On 10 April, five British destroyers, of the 2nd Destroyer Flotilla, surprised her and the other German ships. She and her fellow German destroyers managed to sink HMS Hardy and HMS Hunter, and damage the other three. She was hit seven times, which knocked out her forward gun and her fire-control equipment, and flooded one of her magazines. On 13 April, she was attacked by the battleship Warspite and nine destroyers, and was damaged so severely that her captain ordered the crew to run her aground to allow her crew to abandon ship safely. She later broke in half and capsized.

=== Z3 Max Schultz ===
On 27 August 1939, just days before the outbreak of World War II, Z3 Max Schultz accidentally collided with and sank the torpedo boat Tiger near Bornholm. She was towed to Swinemünde for repairs that lasted until late September and thus did not participate in the Polish Campaign. She patrolled the Skagerrak to inspect neutral shipping for contraband goods during October. Late that month, one of her turbines exploded and the ship was under repair for the next several months. Max Schultz and two other destroyers laid 110 magnetic mines in the Shipwash area, off Harwich, on 9/10 February 1940. On 22 February, she took part in Operation Wikinger and attempted to go to the assistance of the disabled Leberecht Maass. In the process she hit a mine and sank with the loss of her entire crew.

=== Z4 Richard Beitzen ===
When World War II began in September 1939, Z4 Richard Beitzen was initially deployed in the western Baltic to enforce a blockade of Poland, but she was soon transferred to the Kattegat where she inspected neutral shipping for contraband goods beginning in mid-September. Between December 1939 and February 1940, the ship participated in three minelaying missions off the English coast. On 22 February 1940, Z4 Richard Beitzen took part in Operation Wikinger. The ship was in reserve during the Norwegian Campaign of early 1940 and was transferred to France later that year where she made several attacks on British shipping.

The ship returned to Germany in early 1941 for a refit and was transferred to Norway in June 1941 as part of the preparations for Operation Barbarossa, the German invasion of the Soviet Union. Z4 Richard Beitzen spent some time at the beginning of the campaign conducting anti-shipping patrols in Soviet waters, but these were generally fruitless. She escorted a number of German convoys in the Arctic later in the year. The ship was briefly transferred to France in early 1942 in preparation for the Channel Dash where she was one of the escorts for two battleships and a heavy cruiser as they sailed from Brest, France, through the English Channel, to Germany, before returning to Norway. Z4 Richard Beitzen escorted several heavy cruisers at the beginning and end of their anti-shipping raids in 1942. She participated in the Battle of the Barents Sea when Convoy JW 51B was attacked on 31 December 1942 near the North Cape, Norway.

Z4 Richard Beitzen spent much of 1943 escorting ships to and from Norway until she ran aground in November. Badly damaged, repairs lasted until August 1944, when she returned to Norway and resumed her former duties. The ship had another grounding incident in November and was under repair until February 1945. While escorting a convoy in April she was badly damaged by aircraft, and was still under repair when the war ended on 9 May. Z4 Richard Beitzen was eventually allocated to the British when the surviving German warships were divided between the Allies after the war. They made no use of the ship before scrapping her in 1949.
