= German destroyer Z4 Richard Beitzen =

Type 1934 class destroyer

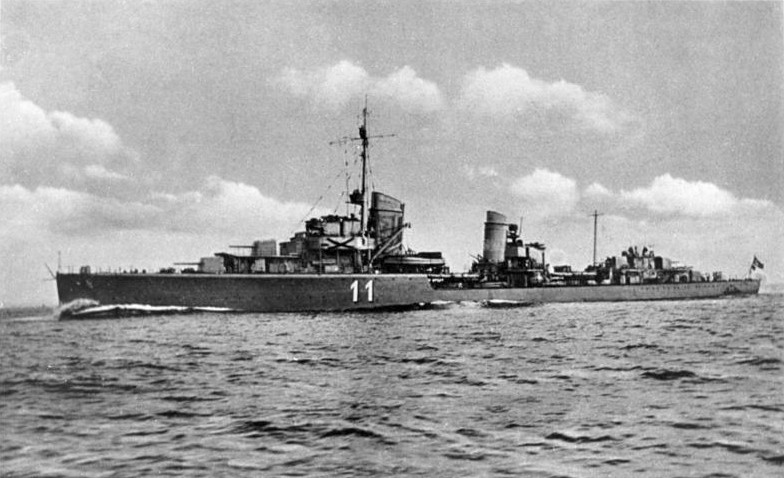
- Z4 Richard Beitzen underway, 1937

History

Nazi Germany
- Name: Z4 Richard Beitzen
- Namesake: Richard Beitzen
- Ordered: 7 July 1934
- Builder: Deutsche Werke, Kiel
- Yard number: K245
- Laid down: 7 January 1935
- Launched: 30 November 1935
- Commissioned: 13 May 1937
- Fate: Scrapped, 1949

General characteristics (as built)
- Class & type: Type 1934 destroyer
- Displacement: 2,223 long tons (2,259 t) (standard); 3,156 long tons (3,207 t) (deep load)
- Length: 119 m (390 ft 5 in) (o/a); 114 m (374 ft 0 in) (w/l)
- Beam: 11.30 m (37 ft 1 in)
- Draft: 4.23 m (13 ft 11 in)
- Installed power: 70,000 PS (51,000 kW; 69,000 shp); 6 × water-tube boilers
- Propulsion: 2 shafts, 2 × geared steam turbines
- Speed: 36 knots (67 km/h; 41 mph)
- Range: 1,530 nmi (2,830 km; 1,760 mi) at 19 knots (35 km/h; 22 mph)
- Complement: 325
- Armament: 5 × single 12.7 cm (5 in) guns; 2 × twin 3.7 cm (1.5 in) AA guns; 6 × single 2 cm (0.8 in) AA guns; 2 × quadruple 53.3 cm (21 in) torpedo tubes; 60 mines; 4 depth charge throwers

The German destroyer Z4 Richard Beitzen was one of four Type 1934 destroyers built for the German Navy (Kriegsmarine) during the mid-1930s. Completed in 1937, the ship spent most of her time training although she did participate in the occupation of Memel in early 1939. At the beginning of World War II in September 1939, the ship was initially deployed to blockade the Polish coast, but was soon transferred to the Kattegat where she inspected neutral shipping for contraband goods. In late 1939 and early 1940, the ship laid two offensive minefields off the English coast that claimed 17 merchant ships. Z4 Richard Beitzen was in reserve during the Norwegian Campaign of early 1940 and was transferred to France later that year, where she made several attacks on British shipping.

The ship returned to Germany in early 1941 for a refit and was transferred to Norway in June as part of the preparations for Operation Barbarossa, the German invasion of the Soviet Union. Z4 Richard Beitzen spent some time at the beginning of the campaign conducting anti-shipping patrols in Soviet waters but these were generally fruitless. She escorted a number of German convoys in the Arctic later in the year. The ship was briefly transferred to France in early 1942 in preparation for the Channel Dash where she was one of the escorts for two battleships and a heavy cruiser as they sailed from Brest, France, through the English Channel, to Germany, before returning to Norway. Z4 Richard Beitzen escorted several heavy cruisers at the beginning and end of their anti-shipping raids in 1942. She participated in the Battle of the Barents Sea when Convoy JW 51B was attacked on 31 December 1942 near the North Cape, Norway.

Z4 Richard Beitzen spent much of 1943 escorting ships to and from Norway until she ran aground in November. Badly damaged, repairs lasted until the following August when she returned to Norway and resumed her former duties. The ship had another grounding incident in October 1944 and was under repair until February 1945. While escorting a convoy in April, she was badly damaged by aircraft and was still under repair when the war ended on 9 May. Z4 Richard Beitzen was eventually allocated to the British, when the surviving German warships were divided between the Allies after the war. They made no use of the ship before scrapping her in 1949.

== Design and description ==
Design work on the Type 34 destroyers began in 1932, around the time that Weimar Germany renounced the armament limitations of the Versailles Treaty which had ended World War I. Initial designs were for large ships more powerful than the French and Polish destroyers then in service, but the design grew as the Kriegsmarine expected it to serve as a small cruiser. The design work appears to have been rushed and not well-thought out as the short forecastle and lack of flare at the bow compromised the ships' seakeeping ability and their stability was inadequate. The only real innovative part of the design, the high-pressure water-tube boilers, were an over-complicated system that received almost no shipboard testing before being installed in the Type 34s, and frequently broke down throughout the life of the ships.

The class had an overall length of 119 meters (390 ft 5 in) and were 114 meters (374 ft 0 in) long at the waterline. The ships had a beam of 11.30 meters (37 ft 1 in) and a maximum draft of 4.23 meters (13 ft 11 in). They displaced 2,223 long tons (2,259 t) at standard load and 3,156 long tons (3,207 t) at deep load. The two Wagner geared steam turbine sets, each driving one propeller shaft, were designed to produce 70,000 PS (51,000 kW; 69,000 shp) using steam provided by six Wagner boilers. The ships had a design speed of 36 knots (67 km/h; 41 mph), but their maximum was 38.7 knots (71.7 km/h; 44.5 mph). The Type 34s carried a maximum of 752 metric tons (740 long tons) of fuel oil which was intended to give a range of 4,400 nautical miles (8,100 km; 5,100 mi) at a speed of 19 knots (35 km/h; 22 mph) but proved top-heavy in service and 30 percent of the fuel had to be retained as ballast low in the ship. The effective range proved to be only 1,530 nmi (2,830 km; 1,760 mi) at 19 knots. The crew of the Type 34 class ships numbered 10 officers and 315 enlisted men, plus an additional 4 officers and 19 enlisted men if serving as a flotilla flagship.

The Type 34s carried five 12.7-centimeter (5.0 in) SK C/34 guns in single mounts with gun shields, two each superimposed, fore and aft. The fifth gun was carried on top of the aft superstructure. The guns were numbered from one to five from front to rear. Their anti-aircraft armament consisted of four 3.7-centimeter (1.5 in) SK C/30 guns in a pair of twin mounts abreast the rear funnel and six 2-centimeter (0.79 in) C/30 guns in single mounts. The ships carried eight 53.3-centimeter (21 in) torpedo tubes in two power-operated mounts. A pair of reload torpedoes was provided for each mount. Z4 Richard Beitzen had four depth charge launchers mounted on the sides of her rear deckhouse, supplemented by six racks for individual depth charges on the sides of the stern, with either 32 or 64 charges carried. Mine rails could be fitted on the rear deck that had a maximum capacity of 60 mines. A system of passive hydrophones designated as 'GHG' (Gruppenhorchgerät) was fitted to detect submarines.

=== Modifications ===
An active sonar system was scheduled to be installed in June 1940 but it is uncertain when it was done. During the war, the light anti-aircraft armament was augmented several times. Improved 2 cm C/38 guns replaced the original C/30 guns and three additional guns were added sometime in 1941. The two guns on the aft shelter deck were replaced by a single 2 cm quadruple Flakvierling mount, probably during her late 1941 refit. Z4 Richard Beitzen appears not to have had any additional AA guns added after this time. After mid-1941 the ship was fitted with a FuMO 24 (Note: Funkmess-Ortung (Radio-direction finder, active ranging)) search radar above the bridge.

== Construction and career ==
Z4 Richard Beitzen was named after Lieutenant (Kapitänleutnant) Richard Beitzen, an Imperial German Navy officer who commanded the 14th Torpedo Boat Flotilla in World War I and was killed in action in March 1918. The ship was ordered on 7 July 1934 and laid down at Deutsche Werke, Kiel, on 7 January 1935 as yard number K245. She was launched on 30 November and completed on 13 May 1937. After being completed, Z4 Richard Beitzen made a port visit to Ulvik, Norway, in April 1938, together with her sister ships Z2 Georg Thiele and Z3 Max Schultz. Upon her return she was taken in hand by Deutsche Werke to have her bow rebuilt to reduce the amount of water that came over it in head seas. This increased her length by .3 meters (1 ft 0 in). The ship participated in the August Fleet Review and the following fleet exercise. On 26 October, she was assigned to the 1st Destroyer Flotilla (1. Zerstörer-Flottille) and in December, Z4 Richard Beitzen, together with her sisters Z1 Leberecht Maass, Z2 Georg Thiele and Z3 Max Schultz, sailed to an area off the coast of Iceland to evaluate their seaworthiness in a North Atlantic winter with their new bows. From 23 to 24 March 1939, the ship was one of the destroyers that escorted Adolf Hitler aboard the pocket battleship Deutschland to occupy Memel. She participated in the fleet exercise the next month in the western Mediterranean and made several visits to Spanish and Moroccan ports in April and May. Upon her return, Z4 Richard Beitzen was accidentally rammed in the stern by the escort ship F9.

When World War II began in September 1939, Z4 Richard Beitzen was initially deployed in the western Baltic to enforce a blockade of Poland, but she was soon transferred to the Kattegat to inspect neutral shipping for contraband goods, beginning in mid-September as one turbine was not operational. On the night of 12/13 December, German destroyers sortied to lay minefields off the British coast. Under the command of Commodore (Kommodore) Friedrich Bonte in his flagship Z19 Hermann Künne, Z4 Richard Beitzen, Z8 Bruno Heinemann, Z14 Friedrich Ihn and Z15 Erich Steinbrinck laid 240 mines off the mouth of the River Tyne, where the navigation lights were still lit. The British were unaware of the minefield and lost eleven ships totaling 18,979 gross register tons (GRT). En route home, the destroyers were ordered to escort the crippled light cruisers Leipzig and Nürnberg which had been torpedoed by the submarine HMS Salmon while covering the destroyers' withdrawal. Despite their escort, the submarine HMS Ursula managed to sneak inside the anti-submarine screen and fired a salvo of six torpedoes at Leipzig in the Elbe estuary the following day. Two of the torpedoes struck F9 which sank three minutes later with heavy loss of life but the other torpedoes missed.

Bonte led a destroyer minelaying sortie to the Newcastle area on the night of 10/11 January with Z14 Friedrich Ihn, Z21 Wilhelm Heidkamp, Z16 Friedrich Eckoldt, Z22 Anton Schmitt, Z4 Richard Beitzen and Z20 Karl Galster. Ihn had problems with her boilers that reduced her maximum speed to 27 knots (50 km/h; 31 mph) and she had to be escorted back to Germany by Z4 Richard Beitzen. This minefield only claimed one fishing trawler of 251 tons. Z3 Max Schultz, Z4 Richard Beitzen and Z16 Friedrich Eckoldt laid 110 magnetic mines in the Shipwash area, off Harwich, on 9/10 February 1940 which sank six ships of 28,496 GRT and damaged another.

=== Operation Wikinger ===
On 22 February 1940, Z4 Richard Beitzen and the destroyers, Z3 Max Schultz, Z1 Leberecht Maass, Z6 Theodor Riedel, Z13 Erich Koellner and Z16 Friedrich Eckoldt, sailed for the Dogger Bank to intercept British fishing vessels in Operation Wikinger. En route, the flotilla was erroneously attacked by a Heinkel He 111 bomber from Bomber Wing 26 (Kampfgeschwader 26). Z1 Leberecht Maass was hit by at least one bomb, lost steering and broke in half, sinking with the loss of 280 of her crew. During the rescue effort, Z3 Max Schultz hit a mine and sank with the loss of her entire crew of 308. Hitler ordered a court of inquiry to be convened to investigate the cause of the losses and it concluded that both ships that been sunk by bombs from the He 111. The Kriegsmarine had failed to notify its destroyers that the Luftwaffe was making anti-shipping patrols at that time and had also failed to inform the Luftwaffe that its destroyers would be at sea. Postwar research revealed that one or both ships struck British mines laid by the destroyers Ivanhoe and Intrepid.

=== German invasion of Norway ===
Z4 Richard Beitzen was held in reserve for Operation Weserübung, the German invasion of Norway on 9 April. Two days later, she escorted the light cruiser Köln home to Wilhelmshaven. The ship helped to lay a minefield in the Kattegat from 28 April to 20 May and then began a refit that lasted until September. She was transferred to Brest, France, in October. On the night of 24/25 November, Z4 Richard Beitzen, Z10 Hans Lody and Z20 Karl Galster sortied from Brest, bound for the Land's End area. En route they encountered some fishing ships south-west of Wolf Rock and engaged them with gunfire with little effect. The German ships then spotted a small convoy and sank one of the three merchantmen and damaged another. The flash from the guns alerted the five destroyers of the British 5th Destroyer Flotilla but they could not intercept the German destroyers before dawn. Three nights later the German ships sortied again for the same area. They encountered two tugboats and a barge but only sank one of the former and the barge, totaling 424 GRT. This time the 5th Destroyer Flotilla was able to intercept the ships around 06:30 on 29 November. The Germans opened fire first, each destroyer firing four torpedoes, of which only two from Z10 Hans Lody hit their target, HMS Javelin. The torpedoes hit at each end of the ship and blew off her bow and stern, but the British were able to tow her home.

During January 1941, the ship laid a minefield off the coast of south-east England. The following month, she escorted the heavy cruiser Admiral Hipper on leaving and returning to Brest. Z4 Richard Beitzen departed for Kiel briefly on 16 March to begin a refit. She was then sent to Kirkenes, Norway in July 1941. As part of the 6th Destroyer Flotilla (6. Zerstörer-Flottille), she participated in a sortie on 12–13 July that sank two small Soviet ships, at the cost of expending 80 percent of her flotilla's ammunition. Another sortie on 22 July saw Z4 Richard Beitzen sink a Soviet flying boat on the water. She was damaged by shock from near-misses by shore artillery during another sortie on 9 August, during which the Germans sank a converted fishing trawler (the Tuman), and departed for Germany for repairs five days later.

She escorted the battleship Tirpitz for several days in mid-January 1942 as the battleship sailed from the Baltic to Trondheim, Norway. Z4 Richard Beitzen, together with the rest of the 5th Zerstörer Flotille, sailed from Kiel on 24 January for France as part of the preparations for the Channel Dash. On the evening of 25 January, Z8 Bruno Heinemann struck two mines laid by HMS Plover off the Belgian coast and sank. Z4 Richard Beitzen rescued 200 of the survivors and proceeded to Le Havre to put them ashore before reaching Brest on the 26th. The German ships departed Brest on 11 February, surprising the British. Z4 Richard Beitzen helped to repel an attack by five British destroyers and was damaged by a near-miss from a Bristol Blenheim bomber that she shot down with her newly installed 2 cm Flakvierling. Shortly afterwards, the ship joined four other destroyers in escorting Prinz Eugen and the heavy cruiser Admiral Scheer to Trondheim. Heavy weather forced Z4 Richard Beitzen and two other destroyers to return to port before reaching Trondheim and Prinz Eugen was badly damaged by a British submarine after their separation. After her return, the ship needed her machinery overhauled and began a refit at Bremen on 14 March. After it was completed, she was part of the screen for the heavy cruiser Lützow to Bogen Bay, Norway and laid a minefield in the Skaggerak en route.

=== Convoy interception ===
Z4 Richard Beitzen took part in the preliminaries of Operation Rösselsprung, an attempt to intercept Arctic convoy PQ 17 in July. Admiral Scheer and Lützow formed one group while Tirpitz and Admiral Hipper composed another. While en route to the rendezvous at the Altafjord, Lützow and three destroyers ran aground, forcing the entire group to abandon the operation. Z4 Richard Beitzen, in the meantime escorted two oil tankers to the Altafjord on 2–3 July. During Operation Wunderland in August, Z4 Richard Beitzen, Z16 Friedrich Eckoldt and Z15 Erich Steinbrinck escorted Admiral Scheer at the beginning and end of its mission to attack Soviet shipping in the Kara Sea. The ships also escorted the minelayer Ulm as it departed to lay a minefield off Cape Zhelaniya in mid-August. On 13–15 October, Z4 Richard Beitzen, Z16 Friedrich Eckoldt and the destroyers Z27 and Z30 laid a minefield off the Kanin Peninsula at the mouth of the White Sea that sank the Soviet icebreaker Mikoyan. Three weeks later, the same four destroyers escorted Admiral Hipper as she attempted to intercept Allied merchant ships proceeding independently to Soviet ports in early November.

During Operation Regenbogen, the attempt to intercept Convoy JW 51B sailing from the UK to the Soviet Union in late December, Z4 Richard Beitzen, Z16 Friedrich Eckoldt and the destroyer Z29 escorted Admiral Hipper as she attempted to divert the convoy escorts while Lützow and three other destroyers attacked. The three destroyers separated from Admiral Hipper to search for the convoy, which they found on the morning of 31 December. The destroyer HMS Obdurate spotted them in turn and closed to investigate when the German ships opened fire at a range of 8,000 meters (8,700 yd). Obdurate turned away to rejoin the convoy without sustaining any damage and the German ships did not pursue as they had been ordered to rejoin Hipper. The Germans found the minesweeper HMS Bramble, which had been detached earlier from the convoy to search for stragglers, as they maneuvered to close with the convoy and the destroyers were ordered to sink her, while Hipper engaged the convoy escorts. This took some time in the poor visibility and Hipper was surprised in the meantime by the British covering force of the light cruisers Sheffield and Jamaica. After sinking Bramble, the German destroyers attempted to rejoin Hipper but had no idea that British cruisers were in the area. They confused Sheffield with Hipper when they spotted each other at 4,000 meters (4,400 yd) range and were surprised when Sheffield opened fire on Z16 Friedrich Eckoldt with every gun she possessed, sinking her with the loss of all hands. Z4 Richard Beitzen was not engaged before she escaped into the darkness.

Commander (Fregattenkapitän) Hans Dominik assumed command in January 1943 and the ship escorted the damaged Admiral Hipper and Köln down to Kristiansand at the end of the month. She began escorting convoys between that port and Aarhus, Denmark, before she escorted the battleship Scharnhorst to Altafjord in early March. The following month she screened Nürnberg during the latter's return to the Baltic and began a refit at Swinemünde that lasted until October. Returning to the Arctic, she ran aground in the Karmsund on 27 October, suffering extensive damage. Z4 Richard Beitzen was refloated on 5 November and towed to Haugesund for emergency repairs. She reached Bergen on 26 November for temporary repairs that took until 18 December. The ship arrived at Stettin five days later but repairs, which included fitting a new bow, did not begin until 17 January as the dry dock was busy. The repairs were completed in June but machinery problems meant that she was not operational again until 5 August when she reached Horten, Norway.

Z4 Richard Beitzen resumed escort work and laid mines in the Skagerrak until she ran aground again in November. Repairs were slow and she was not fully operational until 15 February 1945. The ship was badly damaged by radar-equipped bombers while screening a convoy on the morning of 24 April and put into Oslo, Norway, for repairs that were not completed before the end of the war. Z4 Richard Beitzen was captured by the British on 14 May and temporarily turned over to the Royal Norwegian Navy on 15 July, while the Allies decided on the disposition of captured German ships. She was allocated to Britain at the end of 1945 and was then towed to Rosyth in February 1946. Z4 Richard Beitzen was ordered to be used as a target in September, but a serious leak three months later, caused her to be beached lest she sink. Temporary repairs were made and she was allocated for disposal in January 1947. The ship was allocated to C. W. Dorkin for breaking up the following year and she was towed to their facility in Gateshead on 10 January 1949.
