= Type 1937J destroyer =

Planned class of destroyers, for the Kriegsmarine

General characteristics
- Type: Destroyer
- Displacement: 3,776 t (3,716 long tons; 4,162 short tons) (standard load); 4,427 t (4,357 long tons; 4,880 short tons) (design load); 4,984 tonnes (4,905 long tons; 5,494 short tons) (full load)
- Length: 137.25 metres (450.3 ft) (overall)
- Beam: 14.2 metres (47 ft)
- Draught: 4.34 metres (14.2 ft)
- Propulsion: Unknown, but designed to output 90,360 shaft horsepower (67,380 kW)
- Speed: 36 knots (67 km/h; 41 mph) (conceptual top speed); 19 knots (35 km/h; 22 mph) (conceptual cruising speed)
- Range: conceptual range of 4,450 nautical miles (8,240 km; 5,120 mi) at 19 kn (35 km/h; 22 mph)
- Complement: 360
- Armament: 5 × 15-centimetre (5.9 in) QF guns; 1 × 10.5-centimetre (4.1 in) AA gun; 4 × 3.7-centimetre (1.5 in) AA guns; 2 × twin 53.3-centimetre (21.0 in) torpedo tubes; 1 × quadruple 53.3-centimetre (21.0 in) torpedo tubes

The Type 1937J destroyer class was a design created by the Kriegsmarine in 1937. The destroyers were designed as ocean-going escort ships, which could attack and defend convoys in the Atlantic, while also being able to operate in tropical climates. The design was abandoned before any ships were ordered or laid down, largely because the range and speed requirements could not be achieved without reductions in armament, however it went on to influence later project studies: the Type 1938Ac, 1938Ad, and 1938B destroyers.

== Development ==
The Type 1937J was designed in 1937, and was one of five project studies done by the Kriegsmarine in this year, the others being the Type 1937-I, II, III and IV destroyers. These five projects were all project studies for a "Type 1937 destroyer".

The Type 1937 destroyers were to be ocean-going escort ships, which could serve in the tropics and could attack and defend convoys in the Atlantic. They were planned as a replacement for the Type 1936 and Type 1936A destroyers. They were designed to be able to match any given enemy destroyer. They were not planned to be able to combat French flotilla leaders, a task that would be left to either a light cruiser, or else multiple Type 1937s, if needed.

The initial design called for it to have a radius of 6,000 nmi (11,000 km; 6,900 mi), and six 12.7 cm (5.0 in) guns in twin mountings, with a simple firing control system. Due to the experiences gained from the Type 1934, an increase in gun caliber to 15 cm (5.9 in) was initially not approved, as it was feared that it would limit their seaworthiness. The original design was purposefully made so as to avoid a hybrid cruiser-destroyer design, which would not be able to perform either role well. From this original design came forth the five project studies. Of these, the Type 1937J was deemed the best in terms of armament, with its five single 15 cm (5.9 in) guns, and thus was further worked upon, while the others were cancelled.

However, problems arose due to the inability of contemporary naval technology to simultaneously meet the requirements for weight, speed, range and armament. On 8 April 1938 German Grand Admiral Erich Raeder, the commander in chief of the Kriegsmarine, informed the Oberkommando der Marine (German Naval High Command) that the Type 1937J design work was to be stopped, and that a further eight Type 36 destroyers were to be built instead. Although no ships of the Type 1937J were ever ordered or laid down, they influenced the later project studies: the Type 1938Ac, 1938Ad, and 1938B destroyers.

== Characteristics ==
The design specifications were eventually shown to be unworkable, but during the concept phase the Type 1937J destroyers were designed to be 137.25 metres (450.3 ft) long, 14.2 metres (47 ft) wide, have a depth of 7.6 metres (25 ft), a draught of 4.34 metres (14.2 ft) and displace 3,776 tonnes (3,716 long tons; 4,162 short tons) at standard load, 4,427 tonnes (4,357 long tons; 4,880 short tons) at design load and 4,984 tonnes (4,905 long tons; 5,494 short tons) at full load. They were to have a complement of 360 men. The Type 1937J destroyers were to be armed with five 15-centimetre (5.9 in) quick firing guns, one 10.5-centimetre (4.1 in) anti-aircraft gun, four 3.7-centimetre (1.5 in) anti-aircraft guns, two twin 53.3-centimetre (21.0 in) torpedo tubes and one quadruple 53.3 centimetre torpedo tube. Little is known of their propulsion systems but it is known that they were designed to have an output of 90,360 shaft horsepower (67,380 kW), giving them a conceptual top speed of 36 knots (67 km/h; 41 mph). The ships were to carry 1,052 tonnes (1,035 long tons; 1,160 short tons) of oil, giving them a planned range of 4,450 nautical miles (8,240 km; 5,120 mi) at a conceptual cruising speed of 19 knots (35 km/h; 22 mph).
