= German destroyer Z3 Max Schultz =

Type 1934 class destroyer

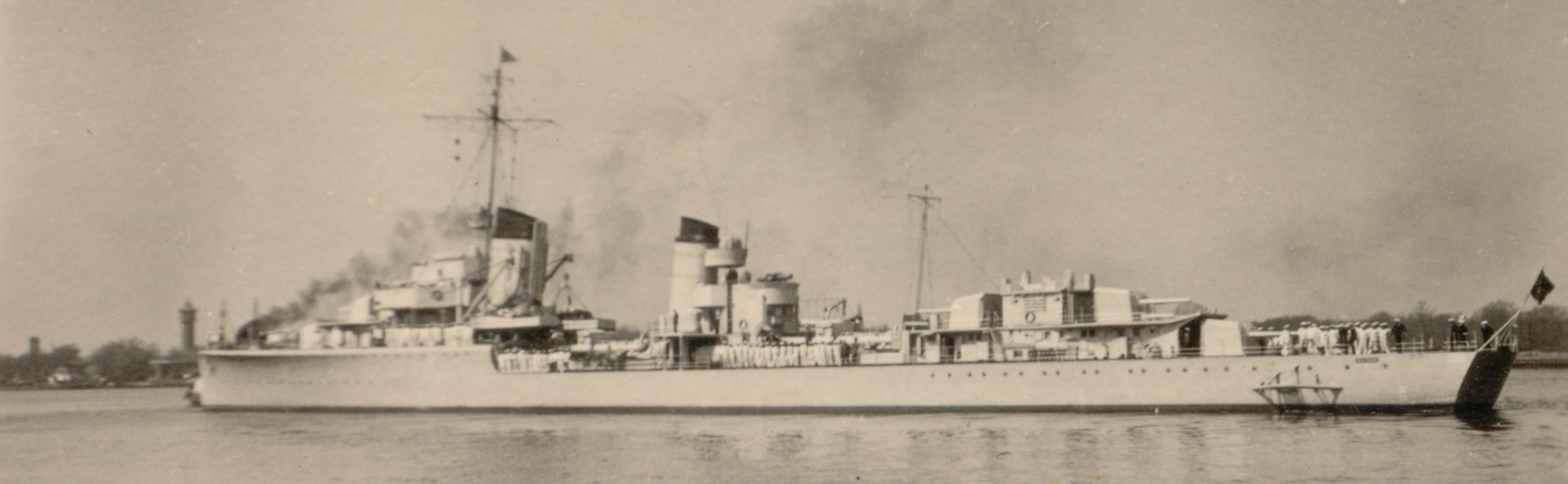
- Z3 Max Schultz in port

History

Nazi Germany
- Name: Max Schultz
- Namesake: Max Schultz
- Ordered: 7 July 1934
- Builder: Deutsche Werke, Kiel
- Yard number: K244
- Laid down: 2 January 1935
- Launched: 30 November 1935
- Commissioned: 8 April 1937
- Fate: Sunk, 22 February 1940. All hands lost.

General characteristics (as built)
- Class & type: Type 1934 destroyer
- Displacement: 2,223 long tons (2,259 t) (standard); 3,156 long tons (3,207 t) (deep load)
- Length: 119 m (390 ft 5 in) o/a; 114 m (374 ft 0 in) w/l
- Beam: 11.30 m (37 ft 1 in)
- Draft: 4.23 m (13 ft 11 in)
- Installed power: 70,000 PS (51,000 kW; 69,000 shp); 6 × water-tube boilers
- Propulsion: 2 shafts, 2 × geared steam turbines
- Speed: 36 knots (67 km/h; 41 mph)
- Range: 1,530 nmi (2,830 km; 1,760 mi) at 19 knots (35 km/h; 22 mph)
- Complement: 325
- Armament: 5 × single 12.7 cm (5 in) guns; 2 × twin 3.7 cm (1.5 in) AA guns; 6 × single 2 cm (0.79 in) AA guns; 2 × quadruple 53.3 cm (21 in) torpedo tubes; 60 mines; 32–64 depth charges, 4 throwers and 6 individual racks

Z3 Max Schultz was one of four Type 1934 destroyers built for the German Navy (Kriegsmarine) during the mid-1930s. Completed in 1937, two years before the start of World War II, the ship spent most of her time training although she did participate in the occupation of Memel in early 1939. Shortly before the beginning of World War II, the ship accidentally rammed and sank a German torpedo boat. Z3 Max Schultz spent the following month under repair. In mid-February 1940, while proceeding into the North Sea to search for British fishing trawlers, one of her sisters, Z1 Leberecht Maass, was bombed and sunk by a patrolling German bomber, with loss of 280 of her crew. While trying to rescue survivors, Z3 Max Schultz was either bombed by a patrolling German bomber, or struck a British mine and sunk, with the loss of all 308 of her crew. A contemporary German court of inquiry stated that Z3 Max Schultz was damaged by the German bomber, however postwar research revealed that Z3 Max Schultz may have hit a mine instead.

== Design and description ==
Design work on the Type 34 destroyers began in 1932, around the time that Weimar Germany renounced the armament limitations of the Versailles Treaty that had ended World War I. Initial designs were for large ships more powerful than the French and Polish destroyers then in service, but the design grew as the Kriegsmarine now expected it to serve as a small cruiser. The design work appears to have been rushed and not well-thought out as the short forecastle and lack of flare at the bow compromised the ships' seakeeping ability and their stability was inadequate. The only real innovative part of the design, the high-pressure water-tube boilers, were an over-complicated system that received almost no shipboard testing before being installed in the Type 34s and frequently broke down throughout the life of the ships.

The class had an overall length of 119 meters (390 ft 5 in) and were 114 meters (374 ft 0 in) long at the waterline. The ships had a beam of 11.30 meters (37 ft 1 in), and a maximum draft of 4.23 meters (13 ft 11 in). They displaced 2,223 long tons (2,259 t) at standard load and 3,156 long tons (3,207 t) at deep load. The two Wagner geared steam turbine sets, each driving one propeller shaft, were designed to produce 70,000 PS (51,000 kW; 69,000 shp) using steam provided by six Wagner boilers. The ships had a designed speed of 36 knots (67 km/h; 41 mph), but their maximum speed was 38.7 knots (71.7 km/h; 44.5 mph). The Type 34s carried a maximum of 752 metric tons (740 long tons) of fuel oil which was intended to give a range of 4,400 nautical miles (8,100 km; 5,100 mi) at a speed of 19 knots (35 km/h; 22 mph), but they proved top-heavy in service and 30% of the fuel had to be retained as ballast low in the ship. The effective range proved to be only 1,530 nmi (2,830 km; 1,760 mi) at 19 knots. The crew of the Type 34 class ships numbered 10 officers and 315 enlisted men, plus an additional four officers and 19 enlisted men if serving as a flotilla flagship.

The Type 34s carried five 12.7-centimeter (5.0 in) SK C/34 guns in single mounts with gun shields, two each superimposed, fore and aft. The fifth gun was carried on top of the aft superstructure. The guns were numbered from one to five from front to rear. Their anti-aircraft armament consisted of four 3.7-centimeter (1.5 in) SK C/30 guns in a pair of twin mounts abreast the rear funnel and six 2-centimeter (0.79 in) C/30 guns in single mounts. The ships carried eight 53.3-centimeter (21 in) torpedo tubes in two power-operated mounts, to port and starboard of her after funnel. A pair of reload torpedoes was provided for each mount. Z2 Georg Thiele had four depth charge launchers mounted on the sides of her rear deckhouse, which was supplemented by six racks for individual depth charges on the sides of the stern, with either 32 or 64 charges carried. Mine rails could be fitted on the rear deck that had a maximum capacity of 60 mines. A system of passive hydrophones designated as 'GHG' (Gruppenhorchgerät) was fitted to detect submarines.

== Construction and career ==
The ship was ordered on 7 July 1934 and laid down at Deutsche Werke, Kiel, on 2 January 1935 as yard number K244. She was launched on 30 November 1935 and completed on 8 April 1937. She was named after Max Schultz who commanded the torpedo boat V69 and was killed in action in January 1917. Korvettenkapitän Martin Balzer was appointed as her first captain. Z3 Max Schultz was assigned to the 1st Destroyer Division on 26 October 1937, and made a port visit to Ulvik, Norway in April 1938, together with her sisters Z2 Georg Thiele and Z4 Richard Beitzen. Upon her return she was taken in hand by Deutsche Werke to have her bow rebuilt to reduce the amount of water that came over it in head seas. This increased her length by .3 meters (1 ft 0 in). The ship participated in the August Fleet Review and the following fleet exercise. In December, Max Schultz, together with her sisters Z1 Leberecht Maass, Z2 Georg Thiele, and Z4 Richard Beitzen, sailed to the area of Iceland to evaluate their seaworthiness in a North Atlantic winter with their new bows. On 23–24 March 1939, the ship was one of the destroyers that escorted Adolf Hitler aboard the pocket battleship Deutschland to occupy Memel. She participated in the spring fleet exercise in the western Mediterranean, as the flagship of Rear Admiral Günther Lütjens, and made several visits to Spanish and Moroccan ports in April and May.

Days before the outbreak of World War II, in the early morning hours of 27 August 1939, the destroyer accidentally collided with and sank the torpedo boat Tiger near Bornholm. Two men were killed and six were wounded aboard the torpedo boat, while no one was injured aboard Z3 Max Schultz. The latter's bow was severely damaged and she had to be towed, stern-first, by Z2 Georg Thiele. Two tugboats arrived a half-hour later and took over the tow to Swinemünde at a speed of 4 knots (7.4 km/h; 4.6 mph). Z3 Max Schultz was under repair until late September and did not participate in the Polish Campaign.

She patrolled the Skagerrak to inspect neutral shipping for contraband goods during October. While returning from one such patrol on 28 October, one of the ship's turbines exploded, causing boiler room No. 1 to flood and knocking out the ship's power. Attempts to tow her failed, but the ship eventually managed to restore power and she sailed to Kiel for repairs. Max Schultz, Beitzen and Z16 Friedrich Eckoldt laid 110 magnetic mines in the Shipwash area, off Harwich, on 9/10 February 1940 that sank six ships of 28,496 gross register tons (GRT) and damaged another.

On 22 February, Z3 Max Schultz and five other destroyers, Z1 Leberecht Maass, Z4 Richard Beitzen, Z6 Theodor Riedel, Z13 Erich Koellner and Z16 Friedrich Eckoldt, sailed for the Dogger Bank to intercept British fishing vessels in "Operation Wikinger". En route, the flotilla was apparently attacked by a Heinkel He 111 bomber from Bomber Wing (Kampfgeschwader) 26. Z1 Leberecht Maass was hit by at least one bomb, lost steering, and broke in half, sinking with the loss of 280 of her crew. During the rescue effort, Z3 Max Schultz hit a mine and sank with the loss of her entire crew of 308. Hitler ordered a Court of Inquiry to be convened to investigate the cause of the losses and it concluded that both ships that been sunk by bombs from the He 111. The Kriegsmarine had failed to notify its destroyers that the Luftwaffe was making anti-shipping patrols at that time and had also failed to inform the Luftwaffe that its destroyers would be at sea. Postwar research revealed that one or both ships struck a British minefield laid by the destroyers Ivanhoe and Intrepid.
