= German destroyer Z6 Theodor Riedel =

Type 1934A-class destroyer

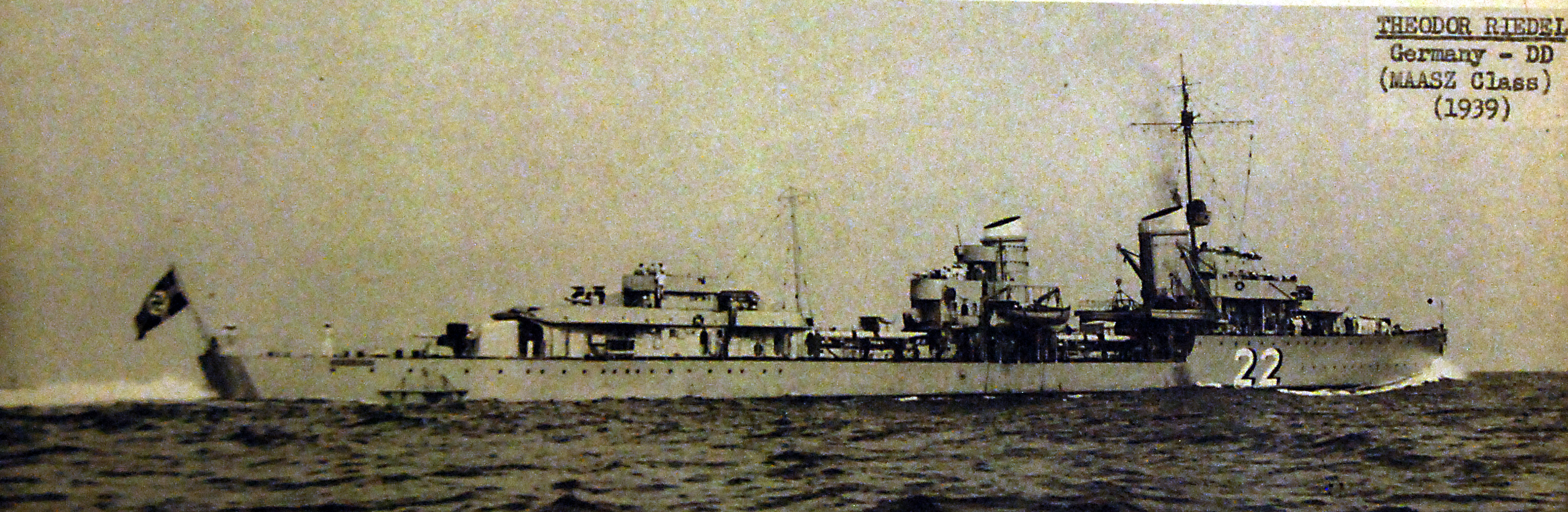
- Z6 Theodor Riedel in 1939

History

Nazi Germany
- Name: Z6 Theodor Riedel
- Namesake: Theodor Riedel
- Ordered: 9 January 1935
- Builder: DeSchiMAG, Bremen
- Yard number: W900
- Laid down: 18 July 1935
- Launched: 22 April 1936
- Completed: 2 July 1937
- Captured: 10 May 1945

France
- Name: Kléber, 4 February 1946
- Namesake: Jean Baptiste Kléber
- Acquired: 4 February 1946
- In service: September 1946
- Out of service: 20 December 1953
- Renamed: Q85, 10 April 1957
- Reclassified: Hulked, 10 April 1957
- Stricken: 10 April 1957
- Identification: Pennant number: T03
- Fate: Scrapped, 1958

General characteristics (as built)
- Class & type: Type 1934A-class destroyer
- Displacement: 2,171 long tons (2,206 t) (standard); 3,110 long tons (3,160 t) (deep load)
- Length: 119 m (390 ft 5 in) o/a; 114 m (374 ft 0 in) w/l
- Beam: 11.30 m (37 ft 1 in)
- Draft: 4.23 m (13 ft 11 in)
- Installed power: 70,000 PS (51,000 kW; 69,000 shp); 6 × water-tube boilers
- Propulsion: 2 shafts, 2 × geared steam turbines
- Speed: 36 knots (67 km/h; 41 mph)
- Range: 1,530 nmi (2,830 km; 1,760 mi) at 19 knots (35 km/h; 22 mph)
- Complement: 325
- Armament: 5 × single 12.7 cm (5 in) guns; 2 × twin 3.7 cm (1.5 in) AA guns; 6 × single 2 cm (0.8 in) AA guns; 2 × quadruple 53.3 cm (21 in) torpedo tubes; 60 mines; 32–64 depth charges, 4 throwers and 6 individual racks

The German destroyer Z6 Theodor Riedel was a Type 1934A-class destroyer built for the Kriegsmarine during the mid-1930s. At the beginning of World War II in September 1939, the ship laid defensive minefields to the North Sea. She covered her sister ships over the next few months as they laid offensive minefields in English waters in late 1939–early 1940. She participated in the early stages of the Norwegian Campaign by transporting troops to the Trondheim area in early April 1940 and was transferred to France later that year where the ship covered another minelaying sortie before engine problems caused her to return to Germany in November for repairs. Theodor Riedel was badly damaged when she ran aground three days after her repairs were completed and was out of action until May 1942.

The ship was transferred to Norway in 1942 and ran aground yet again as she prepared to attack one of the convoys to Russia in July. Repairs were completed in December and Theodor Riedel participated in the Battle of the Barents Sea at the end of the year and in the German attack on Spitzbergen in mid-1943. After another lengthy refit, the ship began escorting ships between Denmark and Norway in mid-1944 and continued to do so until May 1945 when she made several trips to rescue refugees from East Prussia before the end of the war on 8 May.

Theodor Riedel spent the rest of the year under British control as the Allies decided how to dispose of the captured German ships and was ultimately allotted to France in early 1946 and renamed Kléber. She became operational later that year, but she was reconstructed and modernized in Cherbourg in 1948–51. After its completion, the ship was assigned to the Mediterranean Squadron for several years. Kléber was placed in reserve in late 1953, but was not condemned until 1957 and scrapped the next year.

== Design and description ==
Z6 Theodor Riedel had an overall length of 119 meters (390 ft 5 in) and was 114 meters (374 ft 0 in) long at the waterline. At some point before September 1939, her stem was lengthened, which increased her overall length to 120 meters (393 ft 8 in). The ship had a beam of 11.30 meters (37 ft 1 in), and a maximum draft of 4.23 meters (13 ft 11 in). She displaced 2,171 long tons (2,206 t) at standard load and 3,110 long tons (3,160 t) at deep load.

The two Wagner geared steam turbine sets, each driving one propeller shaft, were designed to produce 70,000 PS (51,000 kW; 69,000 shp) using steam provided by six high-pressure Wagner boilers. The ship had a designed speed of 36 knots (67 km/h; 41 mph) and she reached a maximum speed of 36.4 knots from 72,100 shaft horsepower (53,765 kW) during her sea trials. Theodor Riedel carried a maximum of 752 metric tons (740 long tons) of fuel oil which was intended to give a range of 4,400 nautical miles (8,100 km; 5,100 mi) at a speed of 19 knots (35 km/h; 22 mph), but the ship proved top-heavy in service and 30% of the fuel had to be retained as ballast low in the ship. The effective range proved to be only 1,530 nmi (2,830 km; 1,760 mi) at 19 knots. The crew numbered 10 officers and 315 enlisted men, plus an additional four officers and 19 enlisted men if serving as a flotilla flagship.

The ship carried five 12.7-centimeter (5 in) SK C/34 guns in single mounts with gun shields, two each superimposed, fore and aft. The fifth gun was carried on top of the aft superstructure. Her anti-aircraft armament consisted of four 3.7-centimeter (1.5 in) SK C/30 guns in two twin mounts abreast the rear funnel and six 2-centimeter (0.8 in) C/30 guns in single mounts. Paul Jacobi carried eight above-water 53.3-centimeter (21.0 in) torpedo tubes in two power-operated mounts. A pair of reload torpedoes were provided for each mount. Four depth charge throwers were mounted on the sides of the rear deckhouse and they were supplemented by six racks for individual depth charges on the sides of the stern. Enough depth charges were carried for either two or four patterns of 16 charges each. Mine rails could be fitted on the rear deck that had a maximum capacity of 60 mines. A system of passive hydrophones designated as 'GHG' (Gruppenhorchgerät) was fitted to detect submarines and an active sonar system was installed by August 1940.

During the war, the ship's light anti-aircraft armament was augmented several times. Improved 2 cm C/38 guns replaced the original C/30 guns and three additional guns were added sometime in 1941. The two guns on the aft shelter deck were replaced by a single 2 cm quadruple Flakvierling mount, probably sometime during 1942. It is not certain if the improved 3.7 cm SK M/42 gun replaced her original 3.7 cm guns, but Theodor Riedel had one quadruple, two twin and six single mounts for 2 cm guns by the end of the war.

== Career ==
Theodor Riedel, named after Lieutenant (Korvettenkapitän) Theodor Riedel, was ordered on 9 January 1935 and laid down at DeSchiMAG, Bremen on 18 July 1935 as yard number W900. She was launched on 22 April 1936 and completed on 2 July 1937. The ship participated in the late 1937 naval maneuvers and while training with the 2nd Destroyer Division (2. Zerstörer-Division) ran aground on 8 June 1938 near Heligoland island. The impact badly damaged her bottom, both propellers and knocked the port turbine out of alignment. Towed to Wilhelmshaven for repairs, the dockyard was unable to fully repair the turbine's foundations and it had problems with its thrust bearings until a new turbine was fitted in 1943. Theodor Riedel participated in the August 1938 Fleet Review as part of the 2nd Destroyer Division and the following fleet exercise. The division accompanied the heavy cruiser Admiral Graf Spee on her voyage to the Mediterranean in October where they visited Vigo, Tangiers, and Ceuta before returning home. The destroyer had a lengthy refit at Wilhelmshaven from February 1939 to August.

When World War II began, the ship began laying defensive minefields in the German Bight with her sister ships. She also patrolled the Skagerrak to inspect neutral shipping for contraband goods in October. The ship attempted to lay a minefield off the British coast on the night of 12/13 November, with two of her sisters, but had to turn back after she and Z7 Hermann Schoemann suffered machinery breakdowns. Theodor Riedel covered another such operation on the night of 10/11 February 1940. On 22 February 1940, Theodor Riedel and five other destroyers, Z3 Max Schultz, Z1 Leberecht Maass, Z4 Richard Beitzen, Z13 Erich Koellner and Z16 Friedrich Eckoldt, sailed for the Dogger Bank to intercept British fishing vessels in "Operation Wikinger". En route, the flotilla was erroneously attacked by a Heinkel He 111 bomber from Bomber Wing 26 (Kampfgeschwader 26). Leberecht Maass was hit by at least one bomb, lost steering, and broke in half, sinking with the loss of 280 of her crew. During the rescue effort, Max Schultz hit a mine and sank with the loss of her entire crew of 308. Hitler ordered a Court of Inquiry to be convened to investigate the cause of the losses and it concluded that both ships that been sunk by bombs from the He 111. The Kriegsmarine had failed to notify its destroyers that the Luftwaffe was making anti-shipping patrols at that time and had also failed to inform the Luftwaffe that its destroyers would be at sea. Postwar evidence revealed that one or both ships struck a British minefield laid by the destroyers Ivanhoe and Intrepid.

Theodor Riedel was allocated to Group 2 for the Norwegian portion of Operation Weserübung. The group's task was to transport the 138th Mountain Infantry Regiment (Gebirgsjäger-Regiment 138—3rd Mountain Division) to seize Trondheim together with the heavy cruiser Admiral Hipper. The ships began loading troops on 6 April and set sail the next day. Theodor Riedel and her sisters Z8 Bruno Heinemann and Z5 Paul Jacobi each carried a company of mountain troops tasked to seize the forts defending the entrance to the Trondheimsfjord. After passing the surprised forts the ships were able to land their troops and capture the forts with little difficulty. All of the destroyers had suffered storm damage en route and were low on fuel because none of the oil tankers had arrived yet. To defend the port after Admiral Hipper departed, Theodor Riedel was beached on a sandbar on 10 April as a stationary artillery and torpedo battery. The following day she was attacked by nine Fairey Swordfish torpedo bombers of 816 Squadron from the aircraft carrier HMS Furious. They were very surprised to see their torpedoes detonate short of the ship as they struck the sandy rocks. She was refloated 10 days later and towed to Trondheim for repairs. There she was the first German destroyer to receive a FuMO 21 (Note: Funkmess-Ortung (Radio-direction finder, active ranging)) search radar and one set of torpedo tubes was removed and remounted on land near Agdenes to improve the local defenses. On 7 June the work was finished and Theodor Riedel went to Wilhelmshaven for an overhaul.

She was transferred to France, departing on 9 September. Now based at Brest, the ship covered the laying of a minefield in Falmouth Bay during the night of 28/29 September that ultimately sank five ships totaling only 2,026 gross register tons (GRT). Theodor Riedel was plagued by problems with her port engine and sailed for Wilhelmshaven on 5 November 1940 for repairs. Having been hit by a practice torpedo and further damaged by a boiler room fire, the repairs took until 9 August. She departed for Norway three days later, but struck an uncharted reef that ripped open her bottom in seven compartments and caused both propeller shafts to seize up. The ship was towed to Bergen for temporary repairs and then to Kiel where repairs lasted until 10 May 1942.

Theodor Riedel departed for Norway on 11 June and she was one of four destroyers assigned to escort the battleship Tirpitz during Operation Rösselsprung (Knight's Move), an attack on the Russia-bound Convoy PQ 17. The ships sailed from Trondheim on 2 July for the first stage of the operation, although three of the destroyers, including Theodor Riedel, assigned to Tirpitz's escort ran aground in the dark and heavy fog and were forced to return to port for repairs. Coupled with the damage suffered by the heavy cruiser Lützow when she ran aground the same day, the operation was canceled shortly afterwards. Theodor Riedel was temporarily repaired at Trondheim and was towed back to Germany for permanent repairs on 25 July. Three days later they were attacked without effect by three British Bristol Beaufort torpedo bombers.

=== Battle of the Barents Sea ===
Drawing of Z6 Theodor Riedel as she appeared in 1943

The ship was operational again in December and she returned to Norway, together with Lützow, in time to participate in Operation Regenbogen, an attempt to intercept Convoy JW 51B sailing from the UK to the Soviet Union in late December. After the convoy was spotted on the morning of 31 December. Theodor Riedel, Lützow, and two other destroyers were tasked to engage the convoy while Admiral Hipper and three other destroyers attempted to occupy the attention of the convoy's escort. The Germans failed to press home their attack and only sank one destroyer, a minesweeper and damage one merchantman while losing one of their own destroyers.

Theodor Riedel escorted the minelayer Brummer in early February 1943 as the latter laid a minefield near Kildin Island in the Barents Sea. The following month, the ship, her sister Paul Jacobi, and the destroyer Z20 Karl Galster sailed for Jan Mayen island on 31 March to rendezvous with the blockade runner, MV Regensburg. They searched for several days before increasingly heavy weather forced them to return to port with storm damage. Unbeknownst to the Germans, Regensburg had been intercepted and sunk by a British cruiser on 30 March. Theodor Riedel then sailed for Trondheim for repairs, but was nearly lost en route on 6 April when water contamination of her fuel caused her to lose all power. Only the timely arrival of a tug prevented her from drifting ashore. In September the ship participated in Operation Zitronella, ferrying troops of the 349th Grenadier Regiment (Grenadier-Regiment 349) of the 230th Infantry Division to destroy Norwegian facilities on the island of Spitzbergen, together with Tirpitz and the battleship Scharnhorst, escorted by eight other destroyers. While successful, the operation was primarily intended to boost the morale of the ships stationed in the Arctic when fuel shortages limited their activities and the Allies reestablished the bases five weeks later. Theodor Riedel escorted convoys in and around the Skagerrak until she returned to Germany in early December for another overhaul.

After her overhaul was completed in June 1944, the ship resumed her former duties in the Skagerrak, although the repairs required after another boiler room fire in August necessitated lengthy repairs in Oslo. She was damaged after colliding with the mole in Frederikshavn, Denmark, on 18 November and became operational again on 7 January 1945. Theodor Riedel remained in Southern Norway and Denmark until the ships there were ordered into the Baltic to assist with the evacuation of the Hel Peninsula on 5 May. After unloading the refugees in Copenhagen, she made another voyage to Hela and returned to Copenhagen on 7 May. The crew surrendered in Kiel three days later.

=== Post-war service ===
The ship, now under British command with German crewmembers on board, was overhauled in Wilhelmshaven in June 1945, while her fate was determined. She was initially allocated to Great Britain at the end of 1945 and sailed to Rosyth in mid-January. In the meantime, France had protested and she was given Theodor Riedel and three other destroyers. The ships were formally handed over at Cherbourg on 4 February 1946 and renamed Kléber, after General Jean Baptiste Kléber.

Kléber was given a brief refit on 31 August–10 September and then made a training cruise to Bordeaux between 28 October and 21 December. During this voyage, she rescued the crew of the collier SS France-Hélène on 31 October. The ship was assigned to the 1st Division of Large Destroyers (contre-torpilleurs) in 1947 and received the pennant number of T03. Late that year she escorted the submarine Doris to Londonderry to be returned to the British in November, returning to Cherbourg by 25 November. Kléber was reconstructed in 1948–51 during which her bridge was enlarged, her original light AA weapons were replaced by six single 40-millimeter (1.6 in) Bofors guns, her fifth 12.7 cm gun was removed, and American radars were fitted. She sailed from Cherbourg to her new base at Toulon on 20 December. Now assigned to the 3rd Destroyer Division of the Mediterranean Fleet, the ship made numerous port visits in French North Africa over the next two years. Kléber was transferred back to Cherbourg in October 1953 and she was reduced to reserve on 20 December. Her condition was evaluated in 1957 and her hull was found to be in very poor condition so she was condemned on 10 April and hulked as Q85 the same day. She was broken up in Rouen the following year.
