= German destroyer Z16 Friedrich Eckoldt =

Z5-class destroyer of the Kriegsmarine

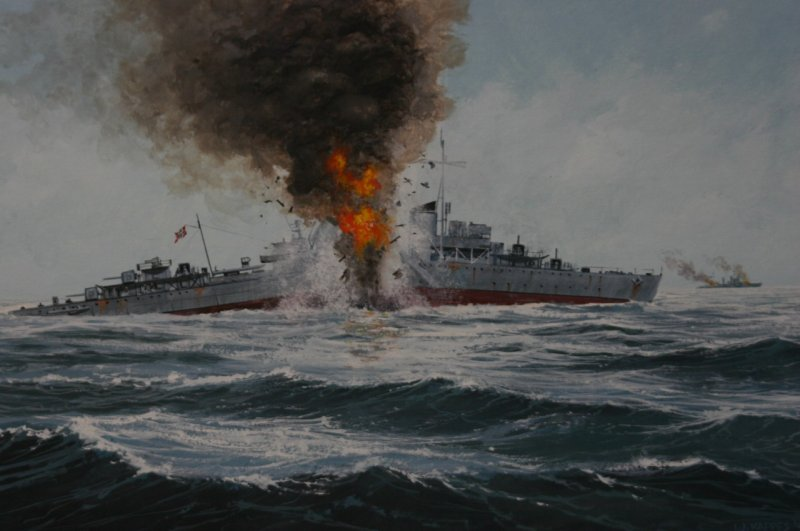
- Friedrich Eckoldt's final moments

History

Nazi Germany
- Name: Friedrich Eckoldt
- Namesake: Friedrich Eckoldt
- Ordered: 19 January 1935
- Builder: Blohm & Voss, Hamburg
- Yard number: B505
- Laid down: 4 November 1935
- Launched: 21 March 1937
- Completed: 28 July 1938
- Fate: Sunk, 31 December 1942

General characteristics (as built)
- Class & type: Type 1934A-class destroyer
- Displacement: 2,239 long tons (2,275 t) (standard); 3,165 long tons (3,216 t) (deep load)
- Length: 119 m (390 ft 5 in) (o/a); 114 m (374 ft 0 in) (w/l)
- Beam: 11.30 m (37 ft 1 in)
- Draft: 4.23 m (13 ft 11 in)
- Installed power: 70,000 PS (51,000 kW; 69,000 shp); 6 × water-tube boilers
- Propulsion: 2 shafts, 2 × geared steam turbines
- Speed: 36 knots (67 km/h; 41 mph)
- Range: 1,530 nmi (2,830 km; 1,760 mi) at 19 knots (35 km/h; 22 mph)
- Complement: 325
- Armament: 5 × single 12.7 cm (5 in) guns; 2 × twin 3.7 cm (1.5 in) AA guns; 6 × single 2 cm (0.8 in) AA guns; 2 × quadruple 53.3 cm (21 in) torpedo tubes; 60 mines; 32–64 depth charges, 4 throwers and 6 individual racks

Z16 Friedrich Eckoldt was a Type 1934A-class destroyer built for Nazi Germany's Kriegsmarine in the late 1930s. It was named after Kapitänleutnant Friedrich Eckoldt (1887–1916), the commander of torpedo boat V 48, who was killed when his boat was sunk during the Battle of Jutland on 31 May 1916.

At the beginning of World War II, the ship was initially deployed to blockade the Polish coast, but she was quickly transferred to the German Bight to lay minefields in German waters. In late 1939 and 1940 the ship made multiple successful minelaying sorties off the English coast that claimed 21 merchant ships. Eckoldt participated in the early stages of the Norwegian Campaign by transporting troops to the Trondheim area in early April 1940. The ship was transferred to France later in the year. Eckoldt returned to Germany in late 1940 for a refit and was transferred to Norway in June 1941 as part of the preparations for Operation Barbarossa, the German invasion of the Soviet Union. The ship spent some time at the beginning of the campaign conducting anti-shipping patrols in Soviet waters, but these were generally fruitless. She escorted a number of German convoys in the Arctic later in the year. Eckoldt escorted several German heavy cruisers at the beginning and end of their anti-shipping raids in 1942. She was part of a German surface fleet which attacked Convoy JW 51B on 31 December near the North Cape, Norway. After sinking the minesweeper HMS Bramble, Eckoldt mistook the British light cruiser HMS Sheffield for the German heavy cruiser Admiral Hipper and was taken completely by surprise when the cruiser opened fire. The ship sank with all hands without returning fire.

== Design and description ==
Friedrich Eckoldt had an overall length of 119 meters (390 ft 5 in) and was 114 meters (374 ft 0 in) long at the waterline. The ship had a beam of 11.30 meters (37 ft 1 in), and a maximum draft of 4.23 meters (13 ft 11 in). She displaced 2,171 metric tons (2,137 long tons) at standard and 3,190 metric tons (3,140 long tons) at deep load. The Wagner geared steam turbines were designed to produce 70,000 metric horsepower (51,000 kW; 69,000 shp) which would propel the ship at 36 knots (67 km/h; 41 mph). Steam was provided to the turbines by six high-pressure Benson boilers with superheaters. Friedrich Eckoldt carried a maximum of 752 metric tons (740 long tons) of fuel oil which was intended to give a range of 4,400 nautical miles (8,100 km; 5,100 mi) at 19 knots (35 km/h; 22 mph), but the ship proved top-heavy in service and 30% of the fuel had to be retained as ballast low in the ship. The effective range proved to be only 1,530 nmi (2,830 km; 1,760 mi) at 19 knots (35 km/h; 22 mph). The ship's crew consisted of 10 officers and 315 sailors.

Friedrich Eckoldt carried five 12.7 cm SK C/34 guns in single mounts with gun shields, two each superimposed, fore and aft. The fifth gun was carried on top of the rear deckhouse. Her anti-aircraft armament consisted of four 3.7 cm SK C/30 guns in two twin mounts abreast the rear funnel and six 2 cm C/30 guns in single mounts. The ship carried eight above-water 53.3-centimeter (21.0 in) torpedo tubes in two power-operated mounts. A pair of reload torpedoes were provided for each mount. Four depth charge throwers were mounted on the sides of the rear deckhouse and they were supplemented by six racks for individual depth charges on the sides of the stern. Sufficient depth charges were carried for either two or four patterns of sixteen charges each. Mine rails could be fitted on the rear deck that had a maximum capacity of sixty mines. 'GHG' (Gruppenhorchgerät) passive hydrophones were fitted to detect submarines and an active sonar system was installed by the end of 1939.

== Construction and career ==
The ship was ordered on 19 January 1935 and laid down at Blohm & Voss, Hamburg on 4 November 1935 as yard number B505. She was launched on 21 March 1937 and completed on 28 July 1938. The ship participated in the August 1938 Fleet Review as part of the 3rd Destroyer Division. On 23–24 March 1939, Z16 Friedrich Eckoldt was one of the destroyers escorting Adolf Hitler aboard the heavy cruiser Deutschland to occupy Memel. She participated in the Spring fleet exercise in the western Mediterranean and made several visits to Spanish and Moroccan ports in April and May.

When World War II began, Z16 Friedrich Eckoldt was initially deployed in the Baltic to operate against the Polish Navy and to enforce a blockade of Poland, but she was soon transferred to the German Bight where she joined her sisters in laying defensive minefields. She also patrolled the Skagerrak to inspect neutral shipping for contraband goods in October. On the night of 17/18 October, Rear Admiral (Konteradmiral) Günther Lütjens, aboard his flagship Z21 Wilhelm Heidkamp, led Eckoldt, Z19 Hermann Künne, Z17 Diether von Roeder, Z18 Hans Lüdemann, and Z20 Karl Galster as they laid a minefield off the mouth of the River Humber. The British were unaware of the minefield's existence and lost seven ships totaling 25,825 gross register tons (GRT). On the night of 18/19 November, Eckoldt and Hans Lody, led by Commander (Fregattenkapitän) Erich Bey in his flagship Erich Steinbrinck, laid another minefield off the Humber Estuary that claimed another seven ships of 38,710 GRT, including the Polish ocean liner MS Piłsudski of 14,294 GRT.

Another minefield of 170 magnetic mines was laid by Eckoldt, Ihn and Steinbrinck on the night of 6/7 January 1940 off the Thames Estuary. The destroyer HMS Grenville and six merchant ships totalling 21,617 GRT were lost to this minefield as well and another ship was damaged as well. Commodore Friedrich Bonte led a minelaying sortie to the Newcastle area with Heidkamp, Eckoldt, Anton Schmitt, Richard Beitzen, Galster, and Ihn. The latter ship suffered tube failures in her boilers that reduced her maximum speed to 27 knots (50 km/h; 31 mph) and she had to be escorted back to Germany by Beitzen. This minefield only claimed one fishing trawler of 251 tons. Eckoldt, Beitzen and Max Schultz laid 110 magnetic mines in the Shipwash area, off Harwich, on 9/10 February that sank six ships of 28,496 GRT and damaged another. Eckoldt was the flagship during Operation Wikinger, an attempt to capture British fishing trawlers operating off the Dogger Bank on 22 February, when two destroyers sank with heavy loss of life – one hit newly-laid British mines in a supposedly mine-free channel and the other was bombed in error by the Luftwaffe.

Friedrich Eckoldt was allocated to Group 2 for the Norwegian portion of Operation Weserübung. The group's task was to transport the 138th Mountain Infantry Regiment (138. Gebirgsjäger Regiment) to seize Trondheim together with Admiral Hipper. The ships began loading troops on 6 April and set sail the next day. Eckoldt's port propeller shaft began to overheat shortly after passing the mouth of the Elbe River and she had to slow down. The ship managed to repair the problem and joined the main body later in the day. The ship escorted Admiral Hipper as they entered Trondheim Fjord and both ships disembarked their troops once they reached Trondheim harbor. All of the German ships proved to be very low on fuel after their journey and fuel oil was transferred to Eckoldt from Theodor Riedel and Heinemann. Admiral Hipper and Eckoldt attempted to leave on the night of 10 April, but the smaller ship proved to be unable to match Admiral Hipper's speed in the heavy seas encountered and was forced to turn back. After some fuel was discovered in Trondheim on 12 April, the ship and Heinemann sailed for Germany two days later.

After completing her refit in early September (the ship may have been fitted with a FuMO 21 or FuMO 24 radar set above the bridge at this time), Eckoldt was transferred to France with four of the surviving destroyers on 9 September. The ship covered five other destroyers laying mines in Falmouth Bay during the night of 28/29 September. Five ships totalling only 2026 GRT were sunk by this minefield. Eckoldt was attacked by Fairey Swordfish of No. 812 Squadron of the Fleet Air Arm during the night of 9/10 October and lightly damaged by bomb splinters. One man was killed and three were wounded. The ship was transferred back to Hamburg on 5 November where she was refitted until the end of December. Eckoldt was training in the Baltic until she escorted the battleship Bismarck and the heavy cruiser Prinz Eugen from Cape Arkona to Trondheim on 19–22 May as they sortied into the North Atlantic. The following month, she escorted the pocket battleship Lützow from Kiel to Norway as the latter ship attempted to break through the British blockade. Several Bristol Beaufort aircraft spotted Lützow and her escorts and one managed to surprise the ships and torpedo the pocket battleship early on the morning of 13 June. Eckoldt took Lützow under tow until the latter managed to restart her starboard engine and proceed under her own power.

On 20 June, Eckoldt sailed for Bergen, Norway, with Galster and Schonemann where they waited until 4 July for the latter's main feed pump to be repaired and for Beitzen and Lody to arrive. All five destroyers arrived at Kirkenes on 10 July. They mounted their first anti-shipping patrol on 12 July, but did not spot anything until the following night. A small Soviet convoy was spotted and two of its ships were sunk after expending four-fifths of their ammunition. As the German ships were returning to port, they were attacked by several aircraft, of which Eckoldt claimed to have shot down one. A second patrol was made on 22 July, but only a single Soviet ship was sunk while the German ships were not damaged by several aerial attacks. When the British aircraft carriers Victorious and Furious attacked Petsamo and Kirkenes on 29 July, the destroyers were far to the east and could not catch the British ships before they left the area. The German destroyers made one final sortie into the Kola Inlet where they sank one small Soviet patrol vessel. Eckoldt was damaged by a single aircraft's bombs that straddled the ship and damaged her steering and starboard engine. This damage was temporarily repaired, but Eckoldt was ordered to Narvik for more thorough repairs. After they were completed, the ship remained in the Arctic for convoy escort duties. She was accidentally rammed by a Norwegian freighter in Tromsø on 12 October and was given temporary repairs in the floating dock at Trondheim on 22 October before she was sent to Kiel for more permanent repairs where she arrived on 9 November.

Eckoldt finished her repairs and overhaul on 15 April 1942 and was training until she attempted to sail for Norway on 11 June. She developed more engine problems en route and had to turn back for repairs. The ship reached Trondheim on 9 July, escorting the light cruiser Köln; both ships laid mines at the entrance to the Skagerrak en route. Eckoldt continued onwards and reached Narvik on 18 July. During Operation Wunderland in August, Eckoldt, Beitzen and Steinbrinck escorted the pocket battleship Admiral Scheer at the beginning and end of its mission to attack Soviet shipping in the Kara Sea. They also escorted the minelayer Ulm as it departed to lay a minefield off Cape Zhelaniya in mid-August. On 13–15 October, Eckoldt, Beitzen, and the destroyers Z27 and Z30 laid a minefield off the Kanin Peninsula at the mouth of the White Sea that sank the Soviet icebreaker Mikoyan. Three weeks later, the same four destroyers escorted Admiral Hipper as she attempted to intercept Allied merchant ships proceeding independently to Soviet ports in early November.

=== Battle of the Barents Sea ===
During Operation Regenbogen, the attempt to intercept Convoy JW 51B sailing from the UK to the Soviet Union in late December, Eckoldt, Beitzen, and Z29 escorted Admiral Hipper as she attempted to occupy the attention of the convoy's escort while Lutzow and three other destroyers attacked the convoy. The three destroyers separated from Hipper to search for the convoy and were successful on the morning of 31 December. The destroyer HMS Obdurate spotted them in turn and closed to investigate when the German ships opened fire at a range of 8,000 meters (8,700 yd). Obdurate turned away to rejoin the convoy without sustaining any damage and the German ships did not pursue as they had been ordered to rejoin Hipper. The Germans found the minesweeper HMS Bramble, which had been detached earlier from the convoy to search for stragglers, as they maneuvered to close with the convoy and the destroyers were ordered to sink her while Hipper engaged the convoy's escorting destroyers. This took some time in the poor visibility and Hipper was surprised in the meantime by the British covering force of the light cruisers Sheffield and Jamaica. After sinking Bramble, the German destroyers Beitzen and Eckoldt attempted to rejoin Hipper, unaware that British cruisers were in the area. They confused Sheffield with Hipper when they spotted each other at 4,000 meters (4,400 yd) range and were taken by surprise when Sheffield opened fire on the nearest, Eckoldt, with every gun she had. Eckholdt broke in two and sank with all hands in less than two minutes; Beitzen escaped unscathed.
