= Operation Wikinger =

German naval operation during WWII

Operation Viking / Unternehmen Wikinger
- Part of the Phoney War of the Second World War
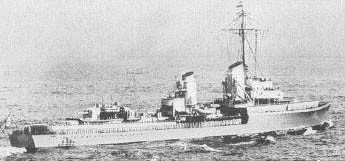

Operation Viking (German: Unternehmen Wikinger) was a German naval sortie into the North Sea by six destroyers of the Kriegsmarine on 22 February 1940 during the Second World War. Poor inter-service communication and co-operation between the Kriegsmarine and the Luftwaffe resulted in the loss of two German warships through friendly fire bombing and German or British mines. Only sixty survivors were rescued and the operation was called off.

Fliegerkorps X had sent several signals to the naval Marinegruppe West with information about air operations over the North Sea but had not been informed about the naval operation. A request by Marinegruppe West for air support on 23 February led Fliegerkorps X to ask if destroyers were at sea but the reply came too late; a Kampfgeschwader 26 bomber attacked the destroyers.

An inquiry exonerated the bomber crew because they had received no warning and no recognition flares had been fired from the ships. Reports of submarines, indiscriminate firing and general excitement on the destroyers caused uncertainty but the committee ruled that the destroyer Leberecht Maass was bombed and that around 7:56 p.m. there was a big explosion amidships. At 8:04 p.m. there was a bigger explosion on the destroyer Max Schultz, which broke up and sank.

== Background ==
=== OKW ===
Oberkommando der Wehrmacht, the supreme command of the German armed forces, had issued standing orders for Luftwaffe–Kriegsmarine co-operation in naval operations. Marinegruppe West was obliged to inform Fliegerkorps X of naval sorties and Fliegerkorps X was required to tell Marinegruppe West of air operations. Sufficient notice was necessary to ensure that operations by one service did not interfere with those of the other. Air attacks east of the Westwall minefield were prohibited unless at the request of Marinegruppe West unless it was certain that the ship was hostile. West of the minefield, apart from attacks on submarines, which were notoriously difficult to identify, the Luftwaffe was allowed to attack on sight, even when Marinegruppe West had ships in the area, provided that this was reported.

=== Kriegsmarine ===
From 17 October 1939 to 10 February 1940, the Germans had conducted eleven mining operations, planting 1,800 mines off estuaries and ports on the east coast of Britain, which sank 66 ships (238,467 gross register tons [GRT]), three destroyers and a trawler. Grand admiral (Großadmiral) Erich Raeder, the head of the Seekriegsleitung (Maritime Warfare Command) of the Kriegsmarine (War Navy) sought to disrupt the activities of British trawlers around the Dogger Bank, which were suspected of spying, possibly to find the swept channels in the Westwall minefield belt. Marinegruppe West (Generaladmiral Alfred Saalwächter) planned to intercept the British vessels with the six destroyers of the 1. Zerstörer-Flottille (1st Destroyer Flotilla, Kapitän zur See Fritz Berger), which embarked prize crews. The flotilla comprised the destroyers Friedrich Eckoldt (flotilla leader), Richard Beitzen, Erich Koellner, Theodor Riedel, Max Schultz and Leberecht Maass.

=== Luftwaffe ===
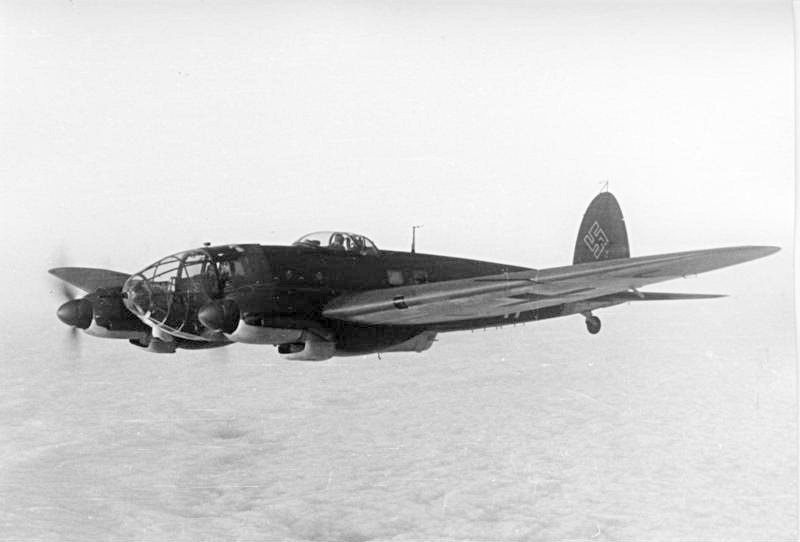
Example of a Heinkel He 111 bomber

On 21 February, 4 Staffel, II./KG 26, equipped with Heinkel He 111 bombers and based at Neumünster, Schleswig-Holstein as part of Fliegerkorps X (General der Flieger Hans Geisler), was briefed to fly an anti-shipping raid between the Thames Estuary and the Humber Estuary. (Note: For maritime operations a separate staff was formed within Fliegerkorps II which after expansion was named Flieger-Division X and then Fliegerkorps X.) The crews were ready by 6:00 a.m. on 22 February and began to take off at 4:00 p.m. Visibility over the North Sea was estimated at 30 nmi (56 km; 35 mi) with a full moon to the south-east. The first bomber airborne was 1H+IM, flown by Feldwebel Jäger who headed north, then used the south end of Sylt as a route marker and flew on a bearing of 241° towards the Humber at 3,300 ft (1,000 m).

== Prelude ==
Fliegerkorps X reported the air operation to Marinegruppe West as usual but an admiral failed to pass on the information, leaving the 1st Destroyer Flotilla ignorant of the Luftwaffe operation. The mistake should have been uncovered when Marinegruppe West asked Jagdfliegerführer Deutsche Bucht (Fighter Leader German Bight) during the afternoon of 22 February for air support to cover the destroyers as they returned to port on 23 February but this was not forwarded to KG 26. At about 6:00 p.m. on 22 February, a telephone call was made on behalf of Admiral Otto Ciliax, the chief of staff of Marinegruppe West, with a request that aircraft already in the air be limited to attacks off the English coast; this was impossible because Fliegerkorps X did not have the codes. Both headquarters insisted that the other contact their forces by wireless to warn them but neither did.

== Operation Viking/Unternehmen Wikinger ==
=== Sortie ===
Map of the North Sea showing the Dogger Bank

Operation Viking (Unternehmen Wikinger) began at 19:00 on 22 February 1940. The flotilla, operating from their anchorage near Wilhelmshaven off Schillig, was proceeding quickly towards Weg 1, a 6 nmi (11 km; 6.9 mi)-wide swept channel of the Westwall, a defensive minefield protecting the German Bight. The ships were sailing on a bearing of 300°, when they were attacked from the air. At about 7:00 p.m. Feldwebel Döring, the gunner of Heinkel 1H+IM, flying towards the English coast, had seen the wake of a ship to port and reported it to the pilot, Feldwebel Jäger. The pilot saw a ship moving fast towards the north-west. On the sea, lookouts on Friedrich Eckoldt saw an aircraft pass overhead at an estimated 1,600–2,600 ft (500–800 m), not showing appropriate recognition signals, that returned soon after. At 7:45p.m., the pilot and the observer, Feldwebel Schräpler, were certain that the ship was a merchant vessel, which also failed to show recognition signals.

=== Air attack ===
While hesitating to attack, the Heinkel was fired on with 20 mm anti-aircraft guns by Richard Beitzen and Erich Koellner, whose officers thought that they had identified a British aircraft. Feldwebel Döring returned fire with the ventral machine-gun at once. The lookouts on Max Schultz saw German markings on the aircraft at the last moment but their wireless message on the common frequency went unheeded. Oberleutnant zur See Günther Hosemann claimed that he saw the Luftwaffe markings in the light of the gun flashes but others doubted him. At 7:43 p.m. Men on Max Schultz saw the aircraft come out of a cloud bank with the moon astern of it and transmitted "Flugzeug ist gesichtet worden in der schwarzen Wolke des Mondes" ("Aeroplane has been sighted in the black cloud in front of the moon") as Jäger made a bombing run at 4,900 ft (1,500 m), convinced by the gunfire from the ship that it was hostile.

The first two bombs and the fourth missed but the third bomb hit Leberecht Maass amidships, between bridge and the first funnel. The ship quickly lost speed, veering to starboard and sending "Habe Treffer. Brauche Hilfe" ("Have been hit. Need assistance."). As the other ships turned to assist the ship, Berger ordered them back into formation, lest they strayed out of the swept channel but reversed course at 7:46 p.m.. Friedrich Eckoldt slowly approached Leberecht Maass, making rescue and towing equipment ready and was 1,600 ft (500 m) distant when the aircraft returned for a second bombing run and hit Leberecht Maass with two bombs out of four. A big fireball rose from around the stern funnel and those above deck on Friedrich Eckoldt saw that Leberecht Maass had broken in two and was sinking in 130 ft (40 m) as the Heinkel departed to the west. The other destroyers manoeuvred towards Leberecht Maass, Erich Koellner stopping engines to drift towards the survivors in the water between the two halves of the ship, sending "An alle. Maass sinkt. Boote aussetzen." ("To all. Maass going down. Send boats."). With lifeboats swung out, ready to begin the rescue, Erich Koellner, along with those of Friedrich Eckoldt and Richard Beitzen began taking on survivors.

=== Loss of Max Schultz ===
At 8:04 p.m. there was another big explosion and lookouts on Richard Beitzen reported another air attack; Theodor Riedel, 3,300 ft (1,000 m) from the explosion, was moving towards it when it obtained a hydrophone contact to starboard, which caused more confusion. Theodor Riedel dropped four depth-charges which detonated too close to the destroyer and jammed the rudder, the ship moving in circles until it was freed. The other destroyers continued to rescue survivors but then a lookout on Erich Koellner reported a submarine. Berger gave orders to stop the rescue until the submarine was sunk, Max Schultz not replying to the order. Erich Koellner accelerated to attack the submarine, one of its boats, not yet cast off, being dragged under the stern. The captain tried to ram the submarine but it was probably the bow of Leberecht Maass. Max Schultz, still not replying to wireless calls, had struck one of the 120 mines laid in Weg 1 by the British destroyers HMS Ivanhoe and Intrepid on the night of 10/11 January.

=== Higher commands ===
During the evening, Fliegerkorps X received information from KG 26 that one of its aircraft had attacked a ship, about 20 nmi (37 km; 23 mi) north of the Terschellingerbank lightvessel. The aircraft had received return fire and the crew claimed to have sunk the ship. Wireless messages from the area were passed on to Marinegruppe West and SKL. The message

The Leberecht Maass sunk in grid square 6954, lower left quadrant. (This spot lies on 'Route 1' more than ten miles from our own nearest minefields in the declared area.)

was received at 8:18 p.m. and at 8:50 p.m.

The Max Schultz also missing. Probably submarine.

The report was forwarded to Marinegruppe West, the commander in chief of the Luftwaffe, Hermann Göring and its chief of staff, Hans Jeschonnek, who asked if this could have anything to do with the sinking of Leberecht Maass and Max Schultz. The Marinegruppe West war diary for 22 February 1940 recorded that at 10:55 p.m.,

...as FdM West has already mentioned in his War Diary, the mine situation in the approaches to the Heligoland Bight is very serious. The lack of minesweepers makes regular or even infrequent passages impossible.

The fate of the destroyers came into doubt after Jäger had landed and reported sinking a ship 31 mi (50 km) from Weg1

KG 26 reported attacks on the British coast and the following incident. "About 2000hrs spotted armed, darkened steamer of 3,000 to 4,000 T (30,000,000 to 40,000,000 G), course 300°, near Terschellng Bank. Several attacks were made from 4,300 ft (1,300 m). One hit was scored on the forecastle, two hits amidships, ship caught fire and sank. No further observations due to darkness. Light anti-aircraft and machine-gun fire from the ship." [Marginal note] "Is this the sinking of the Leberecht Maass and Max Schultz?) The attack on a steamer near Terschellng Bank is most regrettable and contravenes the regulations issued to the Luftwaffe for the conduct of war on merchant shipping. Air attacks at sea are permitted only in a strip thirty miles wide along the British coast. Closer investigation has been ordered."

=== Return to base ===
At 8:36 p.m. after thirty minutes of confusion, including reports of torpedo tracks and periscopes, Berger ordered the four surviving ships to return to base ("An alle. Kurs 120 Grad. Fahrt 17 sm" ["Course 120. Speed 17 kn (31 km/h; 20 mph)"]) after recovering the lifeboats left when the submarine hunt began. Most of the men in the water had died of hypothermia by the time that the destroyers returned. Sixty survivors were rescued from the 330 men on Leberecht Maass, none of the 308 men on Max Schultz survived, one man on Erich Koellner was reported missing. The dispatch of a Vorpostenboot to search for survivors was cancelled due to thick fog and at 0:32 p.m. on 23 February a He 111 flying over the island of Borkum, was shot down by navy anti-aircraft guns.

== Aftermath ==
=== Analysis ===
In 2014, Gerhard Koop and Klaus-Peter Schmolke wrote that the British destroyers Ivanhoe and Intrepid had laid 120 tethered mines on the night of 10/11 January, roughly in the area that Leberecht Maass and Max Schultz sank. The authors wrote that it was certain that Leberecht Maass was bombed at 7:45 p.m. and they concluded that the second explosion at 8:00 p.m. was a mine. When Max Schultz and the other destroyers turned to render assistance, they strayed outside the swept channel, Max Schultz hit a mine and sank.

=== Casualties ===
More than 320 crewmen were killed in Max Schultz, along with 286 members of the crew of Leberecht Maass. One crewman from Erich Koellner was missing.

=== Committee of Inquiry ===
The inquiry concluded that reports of submarines, indiscriminate firing of anti-aircraft guns and general excitement contributed to the uncertainty about the timing of events. The committee decided that there had been a bomb attack at 7:21 p.m. when three bombs fell 1,300 ft (400 m) abeam of Max Schultz, at about 7:44 p.m. Leberecht Maass was hit towards the bows and around 7:56 p.m. there was a big explosion amidships of Leberecht Maass. At 8:04 p.m. Max Schultz suffered a huge explosion, broke up and sank. The aircrew claimed that they made only two bombing runs at 7:45 p.m. and 7:45–8:00 p.m. a discrepancy that could not be accounted for. The Heinkel crew was exonerated because they had received no warning and no recognition flare had been fired by the ships.

=== Subsequent events ===
Destroyer operations in the North Sea were suspended until Operation Weserübung (9 April – 10 June 1940) when another ten destroyers were sunk. Of 22 destroyers built before the war bearing names, only ten were left to cover a coast from the north of Norway to the Baltic and the coast of Estonia, followed by the coasts of the Low Countries and France after 10 June 1940. Three new destroyers joined the fleet in 1940 but the number rose above 22 only in mid-1943.

== See also ==
- Friendly fire incidents of World War II
- List of German military equipment of World War II

== Bibliography ==
- Haarr, Geirr (2013). The Gathering Storm: The Naval War in Northern Europe September 1939 – April 1940. Barnsley: Seaforth (Pen & Sword). ISBN 978-1-84832-140-3.
- Koop, Gerhard; Schmolke, Klaus-Peter (2014) [2003]. German Destroyers of World War II. Translated by Brooks, Geoffrey (Repr. Eng. trans. ed.). Barnsley: Seaforth Publishing, Pen & Sword. ISBN 978-1-84832-193-9. Translated from Die deutschen Zerstörer 1939–1945 Bernard & Graefe Verlag, Bonn (1995). Originally published in English by Greenhill books, Lionel Leventhal (2003)
- Maier, Klaus A.; Rohde, Horst; Stegemann, Bernd; Umbreit, Hans (2015) [1991]. Falla, P. S. (ed.). Germany and the Second World War: Germany's Initial Conquests in Europe. Vol. II. Translated by McMurry, Dean S.; Osers, Ewald (trans. pbk. Clarendon Press, Oxford ed.). Freiburg im Breisgau: Militärgeschichtliches Forschungsamt [Research Institute for Military History]. ISBN 978-0-19-873834-3.
  - Stegemann, Bernd. "Part IV the First Phase of the War up to the Spring of 1940. 4. The War in the North Sea and the Arctic in 1940". In Maier et al. (2015).
- Paterson, Lawrence (2019). Eagles over the Sea 1935–1942: A History of Luftwaffe Maritime Operations (Epub ed.). Barnsley: Seaforth Publishing (Pen & Sword). ISBN 978-1-5267-4003-8.
- Rohwer, Jürgen; Hümmelchen, Gerhard [in German] (2005) [1972]. Chronology of the War at Sea, 1939–1945: The Naval History of World War Two (3rd rev. ed.). London: Chatham Publishing. ISBN 1-86176-257-7.
