= HMS Grenville (H03) =

Flotilla leader of G-class destroyers

Coordinates: 51°39′N 02°17′E

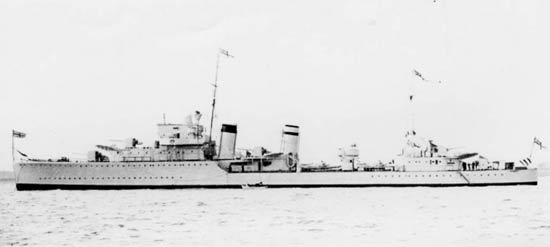
- Grenville in 1935

History

United Kingdom
- Name: Grenville
- Namesake: Richard Grenville
- Ordered: 15 March 1934
- Builder: Yarrow Shipbuilding Company, Scotstoun, Glasgow
- Cost: £275,412
- Laid down: 29 September 1934
- Launched: 15 August 1935
- Completed: 1 July 1936
- Identification: Pennant number: H03
- Motto: Deo Patriae Amicis; (Latin :"For God, Country, and Friends")
- Fate: Sunk by mine, 19 January 1940

General characteristics
- Class & type: G-class flotilla leader
- Displacement: 1,455 long tons (1,478 t) (standard); 2,053 long tons (2,086 t) (deep load)
- Length: 330 ft (100.6 m)
- Beam: 34 ft 6 in (10.5 m)
- Draught: 12 ft 9 in (3.9 m)
- Installed power: 3 Yarrow boilers; 38,000 shp (28,000 kW)
- Propulsion: 2 shafts; 2 geared steam turbines
- Speed: 36 knots (67 km/h; 41 mph)
- Range: 5,530 nmi (10,240 km; 6,360 mi) at 15 knots (28 km/h; 17 mph)
- Complement: 175
- Sensors & processing systems: ASDIC
- Armament: 5 × single 4.7 in (120 mm) guns; 2 × quadruple 0.50 in (12.7 mm) machine guns; 2 × quadruple 21 in (533 mm) torpedo tubes; 20 × depth charges, 1 rail and 2 throwers

HMS Grenville was the flotilla leader for the G-class destroyers, built for the Royal Navy in the mid-1930s. She spent most of the pre-war period as part of the Mediterranean Fleet. The ship was transferred to the British Isles to escort shipping in local waters shortly after the beginning of World War II. In January 1940, Grenville struck a mine outside the Thames Estuary and sank with the loss of 77 of her crew.

== Description ==
Grenville displaced 1,455 long tons (1,478 t) at standard load and 2,053 long tons (2,086 t) at deep load. The ship had an overall length of 330 feet (100.6 m), a beam of 34 feet 6 inches (10.5 m) and a draught of 12 feet 9 inches (3.9 m). She was powered by Parsons geared steam turbines, driving two shafts, which developed a total of 38,000 shaft horsepower (28,000 kW) and gave a maximum speed of 36 knots (67 km/h; 41 mph). Steam for the turbines was provided by three Yarrow side-fired, water-tube boilers. Grenville carried a maximum of 470 long tons (480 t) of fuel oil that gave her a range of 5,530 nautical miles (10,240 km; 6,360 mi) at 15 knots (28 km/h; 17 mph). The ship's complement was 175 officers and men.

The ship mounted five 45-calibre 4.7-inch (120 mm) Mark IX guns in single mounts. For anti-aircraft (AA) defence, Grenville had two quadruple Mark I mounts for the 0.5 inch Vickers Mark III machine gun. She was fitted with two above-water quadruple torpedo tube mounts for 21-inch (533 mm) torpedoes. One depth charge rail and two throwers were fitted; 20 depth charges were originally carried, but this increased to 35 shortly after the war began.

== Service history ==
Ordered in 1934, the ship was laid down by the Yarrow Shipbuilding Company at Scotstoun in Glasgow on 29 September 1934, launched on 15 August 1935, and completed on 1 July 1936. Excluding government-furnished equipment like the armament, the ship cost £275,412. Aside from a brief period when she was assigned to the 20th Destroyer Flotilla after her commissioning, Grenville spent the prewar period as the flagship of the 1st Destroyer Flotilla with the Mediterranean Fleet. She spent ten months deployed off the Spanish coast in the Western Mediterranean during the Spanish Civil War before returning to Portsmouth for a brief overhaul between 24 May and 9 June 1937. The ship returned to the Mediterranean until she was given a more thorough refit in Portsmouth between 7 June and 25 July 1938.

On the outbreak of war in September 1939, Grenville was deployed in the Mediterranean. On 22 October, Grenville and her sisters Griffin, Grenade and Gipsy were transferred to the Western Approaches Command and arrived at Plymouth on 2 November. Grenville and Grenade collided during the night of 7/8 November and Grenville's No. 3 boiler room was flooded. She was under repair at HM Dockyard, Devonport until 1 December. While the ship was under repair, her flotilla had been transferred to the Nore Command at Harwich for local patrol and escort work. Grenville rejoined them the on 3 December and participated in several attempts to intercept enemy shipping traffic off the Dutch and German North Sea coasts. Whilst returning from one of these missions on 19 January Grenville struck a mine 23 miles (37 km) east of Kentish Knock Light Vessel. Seventy-seven of the ship's company were killed as the ship sank.
