= Flare (ship) =

Design element of ships

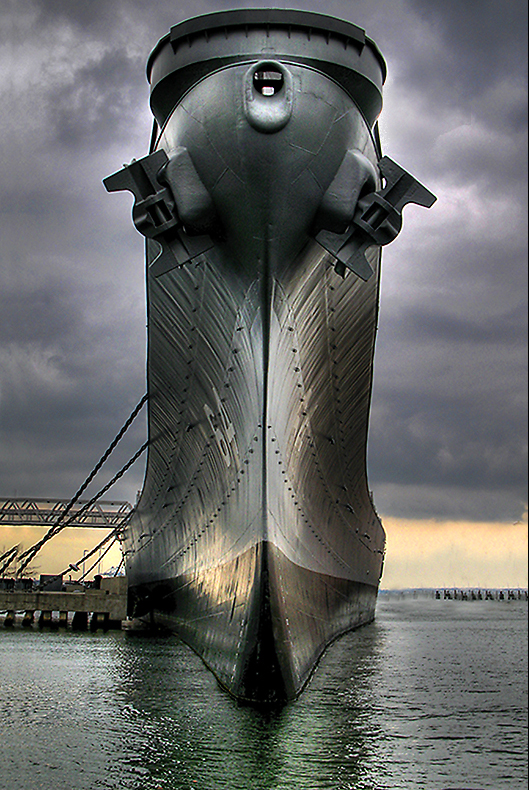
The USS Wisconsin from below, exposing the flares.

Flare is the angle at which a ship's hull plate or planking departs from the vertical in an outward direction with increasing height. A flared hull typically has a deck area larger than its cross-sectional area at the waterline. Most vessels have some degree of flare above the waterline, which is especially true for sea-going ships. Advantages of hull flare can include improvements in stability, splash and wash suppression, and dockside utility. Flare can also induce instability when it raises the center of gravity and lateral torque moment of a vessel too much (by negatively impacting its righting moment and metacentric height).

Tumblehome is the inverse of flare, where the hull becomes narrower with increasing height.

== See also ==
- Naval architecture
