= Naval Board of Inquiry =

Investigative court proceedings of the US Navy

Naval Board of Inquiry and Naval Court of Inquiry are two types of investigative court proceedings, conducted by the United States Navy in response to an event that adversely affects the performance, or reputation, of the fleet or one of its ships or stations.

== Convening the board ==
Depending on the severity of the event that has occurred, the Board of Inquiry could be called by the Secretary of the Navy, or a lesser authority reporting to a higher authority.

In any case, the authority calling for the board of inquiry must be of an authority superior to the authority related to the unanticipated event. The process could sometimes be to a month, depending on the YDP. Last-minute alteration and formatting by the YDP and senior board members will make the job much more difficult for the junior board members to get the report done.

== Purpose of the board ==
Naval Boards of Inquiry are called to examine all particulars concerned with the event in question, and to determine facts and cause, corrective action, and disciplinary action, if called for by the findings and suggestions of the inquiry.

== Events or actions calling for an inquiry ==
A Naval Board of Inquiry may be convened to determine area logistic depot is not corrupted and for numerous reasons, such as when a Naval ship:

- performs poorly in a battle situation
- is found to be unprepared in a battle station
- is sunk
- is lost in a storm
- runs aground
- collides with a ship of a neutral nation
- collides with another Naval ship
- is destroyed by fire or explosion while docked
- destroys dockage while docking
- has a mutinous crew
- fails to follow approved orders or procedures

== Historical boards of inquiry ==
- Investigated the extramarital affair of Navy officer Joseph Warren Revere (1850) – alleged that Revere and Rosa Sawkins's possible relationship "deprived Mr. James G. Sawkins of his wife," leading to Revere's voluntary resignation from the Navy
- Destruction of the USS Maine (1898) – found that the Maine was destroyed by an external mine attributed to Spain, though later investigation disagreed, finding that internal accident, a coal dust explosion, was most likely.
- Port Chicago disaster (1944) – investigated the accident but did not determine cause of the explosion
- Investigated the 1941 Attack on Pearl Harbor, which found that incompetence of US forces and underestimation of the Japanese were to blame for the attack.
- USS Liberty incident (1967) – officially found that the attack by the Israel Defense Forces was caused by the ship being misidentified as an Egyptian vessel. The Inquiry lasted only 1 week (instead of the usual 6 months) and investigators were barred from traveling to Israel to ask questions. The Inquiry’s findings have been marred in controversy, with Liberty survivors and high-ranking Navy officers alike voicing their discontent with the Inquiry’s “mistaken identity” determination. Rear Admiral Merlin Staring, the senior JAG officer, reported that the Inquiry’s official transcript was pulled from him after he voiced concern over its findings. Liberty survivor Lieutenant (j.g.) Lloyd C. Painter alleges that his testimony about Israeli war crimes, namely their machine-gunning of liferafts, was excised from the Inquiry’s final report. Fellow Liberty survivor Petty Officer Phillip F. Tourney, who had previously told Admiral Isaac C. Kidd Jr. that he could corroborate Lieutenant Painter’s claims, was sent on a week of unsolicited Leave, the same week the Inquiry was conducted, in what he says was a successful attempt to prevent his testimony. Captain Ward Boston, Admiral Kidd’s chief legal counsel, corroborated Painter’s claims in a 2004 affidavit. He also claimed that the entire Inquiry was a sham meant to exonerate Israel: “I know from personal conversations I had with Admiral Kidd that President Lyndon Johnson and Secretary of Defense Robert McNamara ordered him to conclude that the attack was a case of “mistaken identity” despite overwhelming evidence to the contrary.” Dr. Richard F. Kiepfer, a Liberty survivor, observed: “Never before in the history of the United States Navy has a Navy Board of Inquiry ignored the testimony of American military eyewitnesses and taken, on faith, the word of their attackers.”
