= 12.7 cm SK C/34 naval gun =

12.7 cm SK C/34
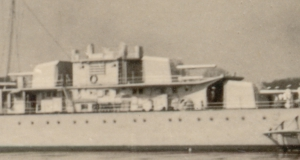
- Aft guns on Z3 Max Schultz
- Type: Naval gun Coast-defence gun
- Place of origin: Nazi Germany

Service history
- In service: 1934–2003
- Used by: Nazi Germany; Norway; Greece; France
- Wars: Second World War

Production history
- Designer: Rheinmetall
- Designed: 1930–1934
- Manufacturer: Rheinmetall

Specifications
- Mass: 3,645 kilograms (8,036 lb)
- Length: 5.76 meters (18 ft 11 in)
- Barrel length: 5.43 meters (17 ft 10 in) (bore)
- Shell: 128 x 680mm R separate-loading, cased charge
- Shell weight: 28 kilograms (61.7 lb)
- Caliber: 128 millimeters (5.04 in)
- Breech: vertical sliding-block
- Elevation: depends on the mount
- Traverse: depends on the mount
- Rate of fire: 15–18 rpm (maximum)
- Muzzle velocity: 830 meters per second (2,700 ft/s)
- Maximum firing range: 17,400 meters (19,000 yd) at 30°

The 12.7 cm SK C/34 (Note: SK - Schnelladekanone (quick loading cannon); C - Construktionsjahr (year of design)) was a German medium-caliber naval gun deployed on destroyers from 1934 through the Second World War. Some of these guns remained in service until 2003 in the coastal defense units of Norway. Despite its name the caliber was actually 12.8 cm.

== Characteristics ==
The 12.7 cm SK C/34 was used on the Type 34, Type 36 and Type 36B destroyers as well as the sloop Grille, the training ship Bremse and the torpedo boats Leopard and Luchs. They were also intended for the unbuilt Type 38B destroyers, Type 40 torpedo-boats and the Type XI U-boats. These guns were either mounted on single hand worked MPLC/34 mounts, converted 10.5 cm MPLC/28 mounts or in two twin Drh LC/38 mounts for Type XI U-boats.

The gun could be depressed to -10° and raised to 30°. It had an arc of fire of 360°, meaning that they could rotate a full circle, able to fire at any given point. The gun fired a 28-kilogram (62 lb) high-explosive shell at a muzzle velocity of 830 meters per second (2,700 ft/s) to a range of 17,400 meters (19,000 yd).

Eight of the naval guns were also purchased by Greece, intended to be used in the construction of two new Greek Destroyers in 1941. However, the outbreak of the Second World War forced the Greek government to cancel their plans. Instead, the Greeks installed the guns to monitor the Corfu strait during the Greco-Italian War.

== See also ==
- List of naval guns

=== Weapons of comparable role, performance and era ===
- 4.7 inch QF Mark IX & XII : equivalent British destroyer guns, firing a shell nearly 12 pounds lighter, to a range 2,000 yards less than the German gun.
- 5"/38 caliber gun : equivalent US gun, but unlike the German gun had dual-purpose mount allowing anti-aircraft fire. However, the 5"/38 caliber was a lighter weapon, and had a shorter barrel. It fired a shell that was about 15% lighter than the German gun, and was also out-ranged by the German weapon by 1,000 yards.
