= Operation Juno =

1940 German naval victory in the Norwegian Sea

- Part of the Norwegian campaign of the Second World War
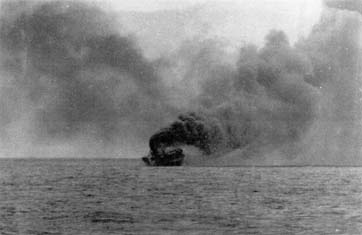
- HMS Glorious sinking
Date	8 June 1940
Location	Norwegian Sea 69°00′N 04°00′E
Result	German victory

Belligerents
Germany	United Kingdom

Commanders and leaders
Wilhelm Marschall	Guy D'Oyly-Hughes †

Strength
Battleships; Gneisenau; Scharnhorst; Heavy cruiser: Admiral Hipper; 4 destroyers	Aircraft carrier: Glorious; Destroyers: Acasta; Ardent; Trawler: Juniper; Troopship: HMS Orama; Tanker: Oil Pioneer

Casualties and losses
50 killed; Scharnhorst damaged	1,519+ killed; All ships sunk

Operation Juno (Unternehmen Juno) was a sortie by a German Kriegsmarine flotilla on 8 June 1940, into the Norwegian Sea during the Norwegian Campaign. The sortie was intended to help the German Army to drive the Allies out of northern Norway and to recapture Narvik.

The German battleships Scharnhorst and Gneisenau sank the British aircraft carrier HMS Glorious and it two destroyer escorts HMS Acasta and HMS Ardent while detached from the flotilla. Several Allied vessels were sunk in other engagements.

Gneisenau and Scharnhorst made repairs in Trondheim and rejoined the flotilla. From 10 and 12 June, Gneisenau, Admiral Hipper and the destroyers sortied. On 13 June, Skua dive-bombers of the Fleet Air Arm, attacked Scharnhorst at Trondheim and achieved one hit with a dud bomb for the loss of eight Skuas.

Scharnhorst departed for Germany with the four destroyers, reaching Kiel on 23 June. To cover the withdrawal, Marschall sortied with Gneisenau and Admiral Hipper from Trondheim on 20 June but Gneisenau was torpedoed by HMS Clyde. Scharnhorst and Gneisenau remained under repair until the end of 1940.

== Background ==
The German Navy (Kriegsmarine) had led the invasion of Norway in Operation Weserübung and had lost many ships. Admiral Hipper was in dry dock after being rammed by the British destroyer HMS Glowworm on 8 April. The battleships Scharnhorst and Gneisenau were in dry dock with storm and battle damage after their encounter with HMS Renown at the Action off Lofoten on 9 April. Of the two Deutschland-class heavy cruisers, Lützow had been torpedoed and would be out of action for months and Admiral Scheer was still being refitted. Blücher, one of the two Admiral Hipper-class heavy cruisers, had been sunk on 9 April by the Norwegians during the attack on Oslo.

After the German invasion of Norway on 9 April 1940, the French and British had begun the Namsos campaign in central Norway and landings in Harstad in northern Norway. Towards the end of May, the Allies evacuated central Norway but had captured the important town of Narvik in northern Norway. German forces under the command of General Eduard Dietl had retreated into the mountains around Narvik and the commander of the Kriegsmarine, Admiral Erich Raeder, ordered the German navy to assist the army in northern Norway.

No capital ships were available to oppose the Allied landings but at the end of May, a battle group was assembled, comprising the battleships Scharnhorst and Gneisenau that had completed their repairs, the heavy cruiser Admiral Hipper and the destroyers Z20 Karl Galster, Z10 Hans Lody, Z15 Erich Steinbrinck and Z7 Hermann Schoemann. The force was put under the command of Flottenchef Vizeadmiral Wilhelm Marschall who received the orders to assist Dietl by attacking the Allies at their naval base in Harstad and by supporting German forces advancing overland to Narvik. To make continuous operations possible, the German force was to operate from Trondheim, where a naval base had been set up.

== Operation ==
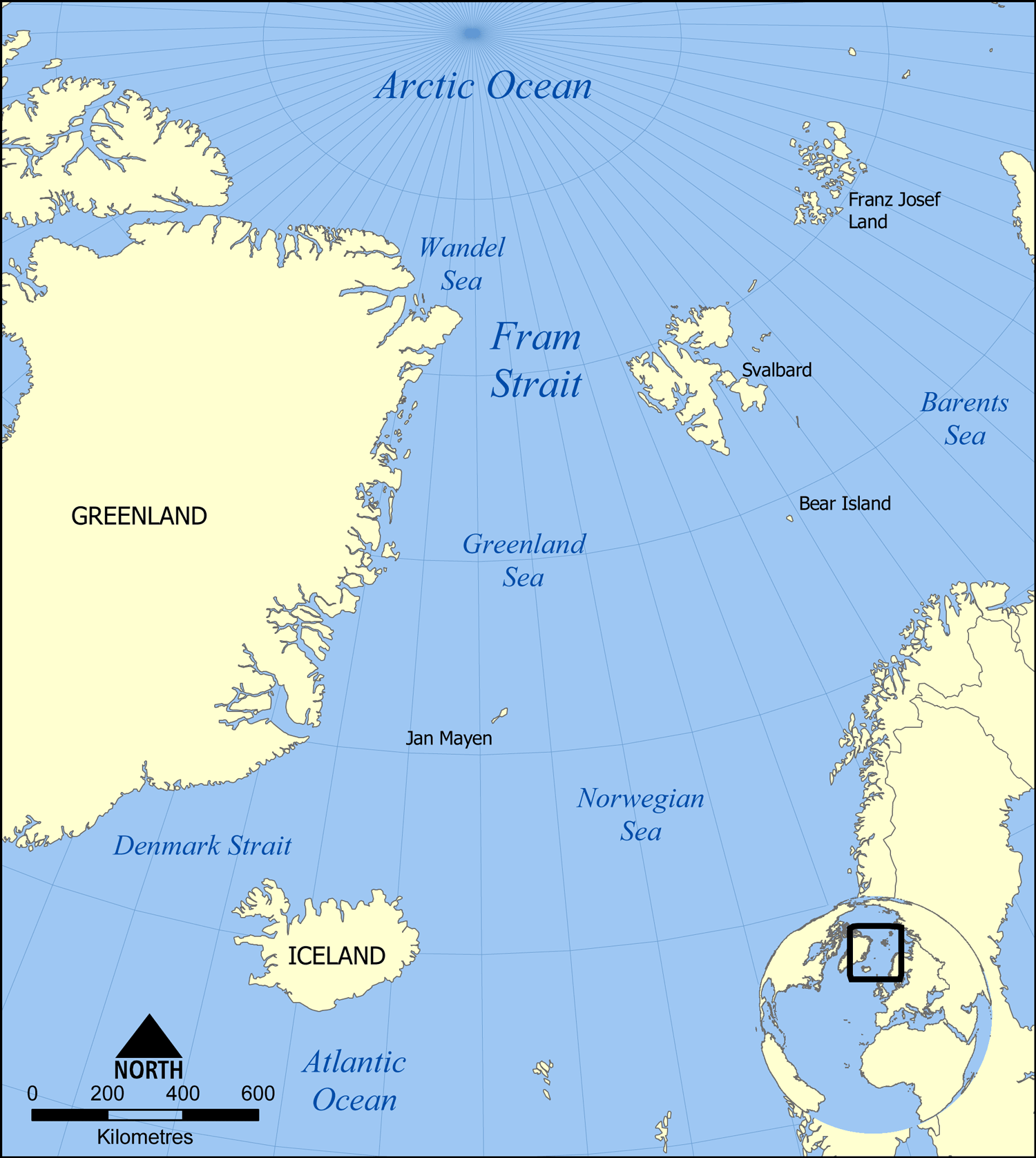
Map of the Norwegian Sea, showing Jan Mayen

The ships departed from Kiel on 4 June and steamed undetected at high speed through the Skagerrak, along the Norwegian coast and into the Arctic. During the night of 6 June two destroyers refuelled from the battleships and on 7 June Admiral Hipper and the two other destroyers refuelled from the replenishment oiler Dithmarschen near Jan Mayen island. In the evening of 7 June Marschall held a conference aboard Gneisenau to organize the attack on Harstad. Air reconnaissance had reported convoys and two carriers steaming westwards but no information about Harstad was available. Marschall suspected the Allies were evacuating Norway and he decided to abandon the attack on Harstad and destroy the convoys. At 05:00 on 8 June, the German ships formed line abreast in search of the convoys.

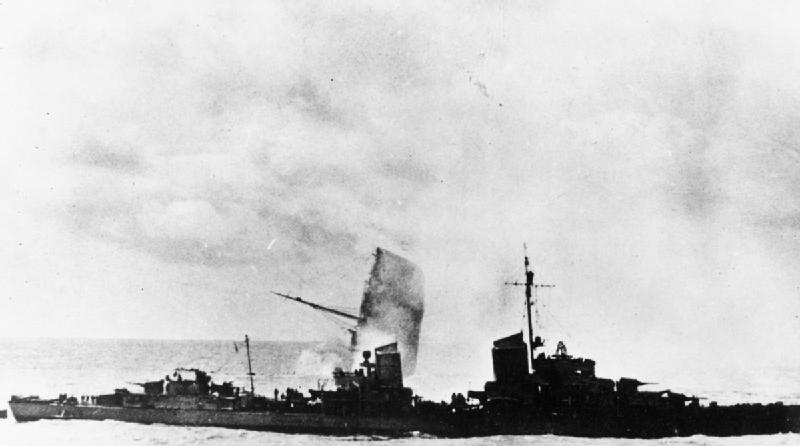
Hans Lody rescuing survivors from the troop transport Orama

At 06:45 Admiral Hipper sighted a tanker and an escorting trawler. Hipper sank the escort HMT Juniper with her secondary armament and rescued a survivor. Marschall, aboard Gneisenau, closed in on the scene and Gneisenau shelled the tanker Oil Pioneer (5,666 GRT) at 67°44′N, 03°52′E that caught fire and was finished off with a torpedo from Hermann Schoemann, the destroyer rescued eleven survivors but twenty crew were killed. After this engagement, the German ships resumed their position in the patrol line, searching for the convoy. At 08:45 Admiral Hipper and Scharnhorst launched their Arado Ar 196 reconnaissance floatplanes, that found two ships but no convoy.

The first ship was the empty troop transport Orama (19,840 GRT) which was sunk by Admiral Hipper and Hans Lody at 12:10, nineteen members of the crew were killed and 280 men were taken prisoner. (Note: Rowher mentions that Hans Lody captured a trawler but that is an error.) The second ship was the hospital ship Atlantis which refrained from reporting the attack and the Germans respected its immunity. Marschall decided to abandon the search for the convoy and ordered Admiral Hipper and the destroyers to Trondheim to comply with the second part of his operational orders, to support the German troops at Trondheim. The battleships remained in the Arctic and steamed northwards to refuel from Dithmarschen.

Marschall wanted to operate with the two battleships against ships reported by the B-Dienst section aboard his ship, that had intercepted signals from the carriers HMS Ark Royal, HMS Glorious and the Town-class cruiser light cruiser HMS Southampton. The weather was excellent with unlimited visibility and at 16:45 a lookout on Scharnhorst reported a faint cloud; upon investigation with the optic rangefinder the top of a mast was noticed at a distance of 25 nmi (46 km). The German battleships gave chase and at 17:13 they identified a carrier, first thought to be Ark Royal, and two escorting destroyers, HMS Acasta and Ardent.

=== Sinking of HMS Glorious ===
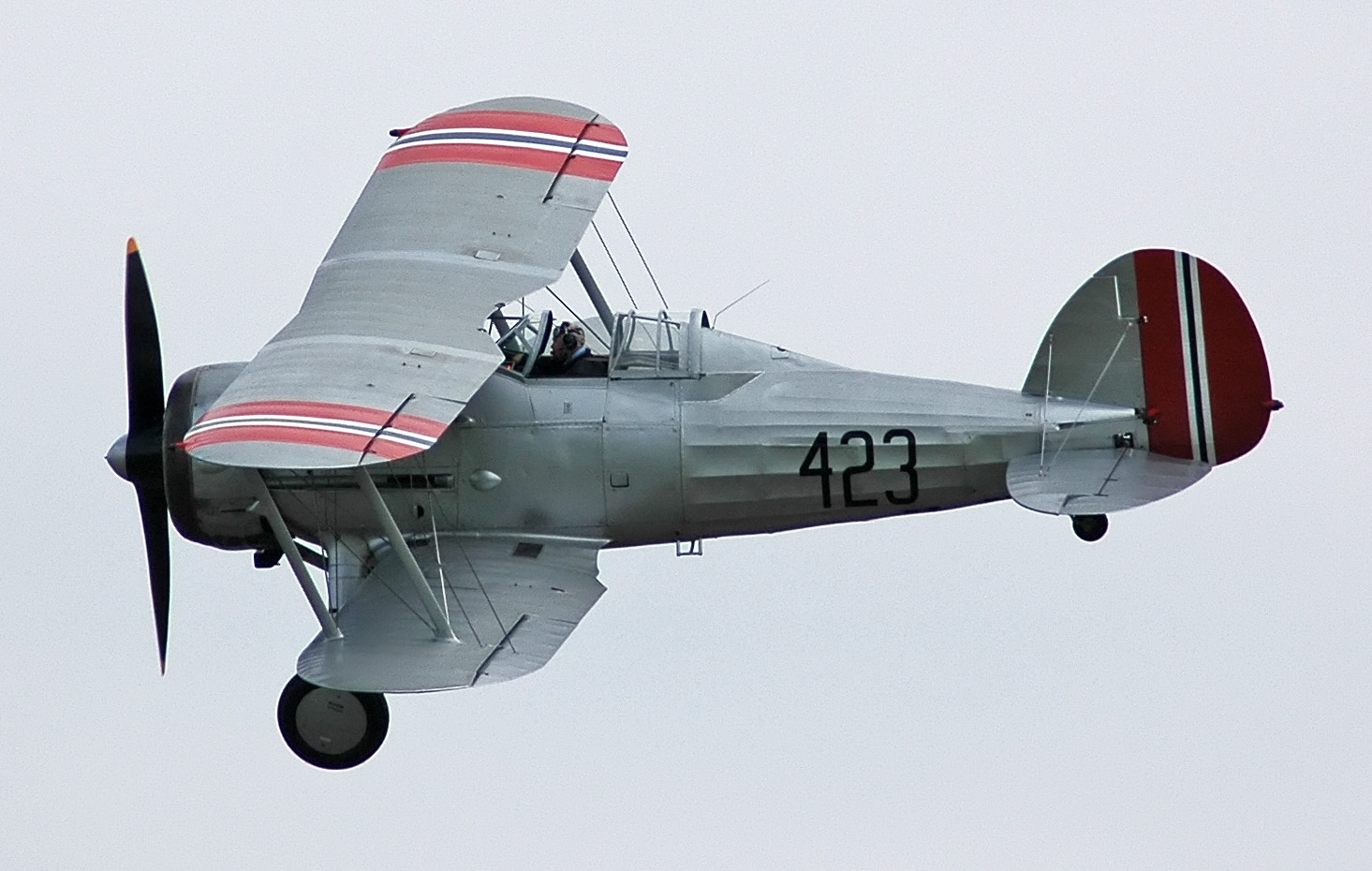
Example of a Gloster Gladiator Mk 1 in Norwegian service

On the night of 7/8 June, the aircraft carrier Glorious (Captain Guy D'Oyly-Hughes), took on board ten Gladiator fighters of 263 Squadron Royal Air Force (RAF) and eight Hurricane fighters of 46 Squadron, the first landing of modern aircraft without arrester hooks on an aircraft carrier. The fighters had flown from land bases to avoid being destroyed in the evacuation. Glorious was part of a troop convoy headed for Scapa Flow, also including the carrier Ark Royal but in the early hours of 8 June, D'Oyly-Hughes requested permission to proceed independently with Acasta and Ardent.

Glorious was in a low state of readiness. The crow's nest lookout was not manned, leaving the observation task to the destroyers with much lower observation angles. Only twelve out of 18 boilers were in use, so she could not develop quickly full speed [from 17 kn (31 km/h; 20 mph) to 30 kn (56 km/h; 35 mph)]. Glorious carried the seven Hurricanes and ten Gladiators of the RAF along with six Swordfish of 823 Naval Air Squadron and the Sea Gladiators of 802 Naval Air Squadron. A Swordfish and three Sea Gladiators were at ten minutes' notice below deck but the previous commander always had some aircraft in the air. D'Oyly-Hughes failed to launch aircraft for a Combat Air Patrol around the carrier group, reportedly to give the aircrews a rest.

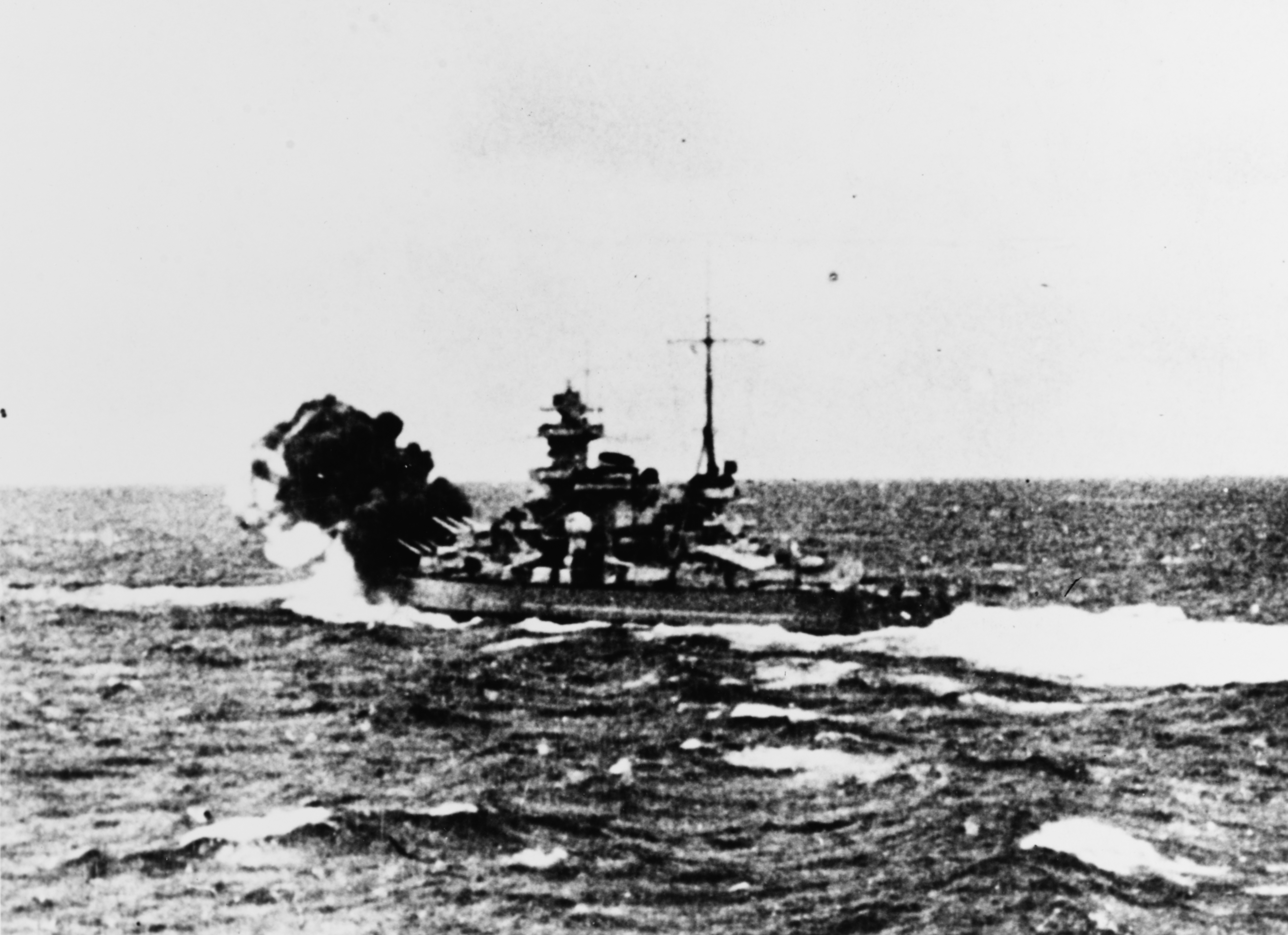
Scharnhorst firing her forward 283 mm guns during the engagement with Glorious and her escorts

While sailing through the Norwegian Sea on 8 June, the carrier, Acasta and Ardent were intercepted by the German battleships Scharnhorst and Gneisenau off Norway at about 69°N, 00° E. Scharnhorst turned towards Glorious immediately upon her sighting, without waiting for an order from Marschall aboard Gneisenau. Scharnhorst was well ahead of Gneisenau and opened fire first at 17:32 with a salvo from her forward turrets at a distance of 26 km (14 nmi; 16 mi) (Note: The times used are in CET, which is used by the Germans; this is one hour behind GMT, which is used by the British.)

After 52 seconds the salvo fell short and then Scharnhorst fired three ranging salvoes with one turret each. Having found the range with the second salvo, hits were gained with the fourth salvo. Scharnhorst obtained its first hit at 17:38 at the extreme range of 24,000 m (26,000 yd), before Glorious could launch her torpedo-bombers. At 17:46 Gneisenau opened fire with her main battery. The destroyers had begun to make smoke to protect Glorious which was effective at first but receded around 18:20, exposing Glorious again.

Ardent and Acasta made continual attempts to launch torpedoes at the German ships. At about 18:39, Scharnhorst was hit by one of four torpedoes launched by Acasta; fifty sailors were killed, 2,500 long tons (2,500 t) of water flooded into her and her aft turret was put out of action. Ardent was sunk at around 18:20, having made seven attacks with torpedoes. The approximate sinking position based on last transmission from Glorious is 69°0′N 04°0′E. Marschall, aboard Gneisenau, ordered Scharnhorst to cease wasting ammunition on Glorious. Gneisenau was 4,374 yd (2.160 nmi; 2.485 mi; 4.000 km) closer to Glorious than Scharnhorst.

== Aftermath ==
=== Analysis ===
Despite the apparent success of the operation, Marschall was roundly criticised by Raeder for not sticking to the letter of his operational orders and not having attacked Harstad. Marschall, who believed that he had received some degree of operational freedom and who firmly believed that a commander at sea should have some, was sacked and replaced as fleet commander by Admiral Günther Lütjens.

=== Casualties ===
Due to their exposed position, the German ships were not able to stop to rescue survivors of any of the ships. Thirty-three officers were killed and another forty-two were missing in Glorious, seventy-two ratings killed or died of wounds and 865 were missing. Nineteen Royal Marines were killed and eighty missing; a Maltese rating was killed and another thirty missing along with six NAAFI staff. Five RAF personnel were killed and thirty-six were missing and eighteen RAF pilots of 46 Squadron and 263 Squadron were killed or missing; the total number of men killed or missing in Glorious was 1,207. Acasta suffered two officers killed and six missing, twelve ratings killed or died of wounds and 139 ratings missing and one NAAFI staff member missing, a total of 160 killed or missing. In Ardent ten officers were missing presumed killed, two ratings were killed or died of wounds and 139 ratings and one NAAFI staff member were missing, for a total of 152 killed or missing. Casualties for all three ships were 1,519 men killed or missing. There were 45 survivors, the survivor from Acasta was rescued by the Norwegian steam merchant ship Borgund which also saved 38 men from one of Glorious' lifeboats. The men saved by Borgund were set ashore at Tórshavn in the Faroe Islands on 14 June. The steamship Svalbard II took four survivors and one man who had died of wounds to Norway, thence to prison camps in Germany.

=== Subsequent operations ===
Gneisenau and Scharnhorst made for Trondheim for repairs, where they joined Admiral Hipper and the four destroyers. Between 10 and 12 June Marschall sortied with Gneisenau, Admiral Hipper and the destroyers; due to a lack of air reconnaissance and the presence of the British fleet he returned to Trondheim. On 13 June, 15 Skua bombers of the Fleet Air Arm, from Ark Royal, attacked Scharnhorst in harbour. One dud bomb struck her for the loss of eight Skuas. After emergency repairs in Trondheim of the torpedo damage, Scharnhorst departed for Germany escorted by the four destroyers, reaching Kiel on 23 June to go into dry dock. To cover the withdrawal of Scharnhorst, Marschall sortied with Gneisenau and Admiral Hipper from Trondheim on 20 June but Gneisenau was torpedoed and damaged in the bows by the British submarine HMS Clyde. Scharnhorst and Gneisenau remained under repair until the end of 1940.

== Orders of battle ==
=== Unternehmen Juno ===
Kriegsmarine flotilla
Ship	Flag	Type	Notes
Gneisenau	Kriegsmarine	Scharnhorst-class battleship	Detached, 8 June
Scharnhorst	Kriegsmarine	Scharnhorst-class battleship	Detached, 8 June
Admiral Hipper	Kriegsmarine	Admiral Hipper-class cruiser	
Z7 Hermann Schoemann	Kriegsmarine	Type 1934A-class destroyer	
Z10 Hans Lody	Kriegsmarine	Type 1934A-class destroyer	
Z15 Erich Steinbrinck	Kriegsmarine	Type 1934A-class destroyer	
Z20 Karl Galster	Kriegsmarine	Type 1936-class destroyer	

=== British ships ===
Ships sunk during Unternehmen Juno
Ship	Flag	GRT/Type	Notes
HMS Orama	Royal Navy	19,840 GRT	Troopship, sunk, 8 June
SS Oil Pioneer	Merchant Navy	5,666 GRT	Tanker, sunk, 8 June
HMT Juniper	Royal Navy	Tree-class trawler	Minesweeper, sunk, 8 June

=== HMS Glorious ===
HMS Glorious and escorts
Ship	Flag	Type	Notes
HMS Glorious	Royal Navy	Courageous-class aircraft carrier	Sunk, 8 June
HMS Acasta	Royal Navy	A-class destroyer	Sunk, 8 June
HMS Ardent	Royal Navy	A-class destroyer	Sunk, 8 June

== See also ==
- List of Kriegsmarine ships
- List of classes of British ships of World War II
