= German destroyer Z10 Hans Lody =

Type 1934A-class destroyer

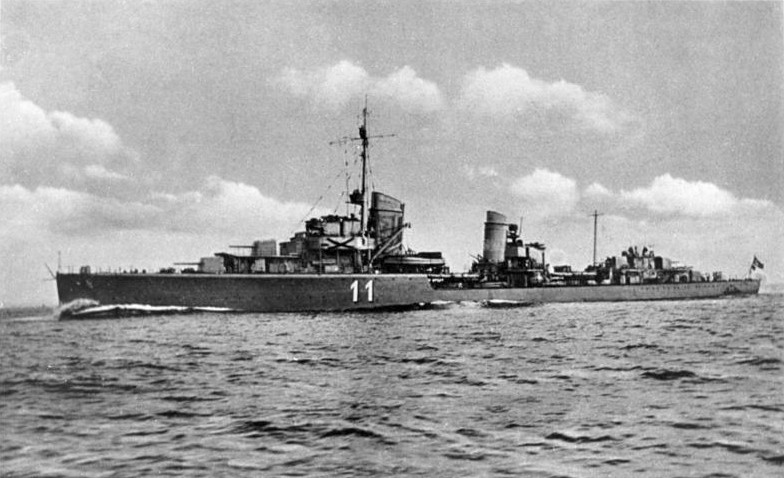
- Sister ship Z4 Richard Beitzen underway, 1937

History

Nazi Germany
- Name: Z10 Hans Lody
- Namesake: Carl Hans Lody
- Ordered: 9 January 1935
- Builder: Germaniawerft, Kiel
- Yard number: G536
- Laid down: 1 April 1935
- Launched: 14 May 1936
- Completed: 13 September 1938
- Captured: May 1945
- Fate: Sold for scrap, 1949

General characteristics (as built)
- Class & type: Type 1934A-class destroyer
- Displacement: 2,171 long tons (2,206 t) (standard); 3,190 long tons (3,240 t) (deep load)
- Length: 119 m (390 ft 5 in) o/a; 114 m (374 ft 0 in) w/l
- Beam: 11.3 m (37 ft 1 in)
- Draft: 4.23 m (13 ft 11 in)
- Installed power: 70,000 PS (51,000 kW; 69,000 shp); 6 × water-tube boilers
- Propulsion: 2 shafts, 2 × geared steam turbines
- Speed: 36 knots (67 km/h; 41 mph)
- Range: 1,530 nmi (2,830 km; 1,760 mi) at 19 knots (35 km/h; 22 mph)
- Complement: 325
- Armament: 5 × single 12.7 cm (5 in) guns; 2 × twin 3.7 cm (1.5 in) AA guns; 6 × single 2 cm (0.8 in) AA guns; 2 × quadruple 53.3 cm (21 in) torpedo tubes; 60 mines; 32–64 depth charges, 4 throwers and 6 individual racks

Z10 Hans Lody was a Type 1934A-class destroyer built for Nazi Germany's Kriegsmarine in the mid-1930s. At the beginning of World War II on 1 September 1939, the ship was initially deployed to blockade the Polish coast, but she was quickly transferred to the North Sea to lay defensive minefields. In late 1939 the ship laid multiple offensive minefields off the English coast that claimed nine merchant ships and she crippled a British destroyer during one of these missions.

Hans Lody was under repair for most of the Norwegian Campaign and was transferred to France in late 1940 where she participated in several engagements with British ships, crippling another destroyer. The ship returned to Germany in late 1940 for a refit and was transferred to Norway in June 1941 as part of the preparations for Operation Barbarossa, the German invasion of the Soviet Union. Hans Lody spent some time at the beginning of the campaign conducting anti-shipping patrols in Soviet waters, but these were generally fruitless. She escorted a number of German convoys in the Arctic later in the year before returning to Germany in September for machinery repairs.

The ship returned to Norway in mid-1942, but was badly damaged when she ran aground in July and did not return until April 1943. Hans Lody participated in the German attack (Operation Zitronella) on the Norwegian island of Spitzbergen, well north of the Arctic Circle and then spent the next six months on convoy duties in southern Norway. The ship began a lengthy refit in April 1944 and was not operational for the next year. She spent April 1945 escorting convoys in Danish waters before making one voyage to rescue refugees in East Prussia in May. Hans Lody was assigned to the Royal Navy after the war and used as a training ship and then a barracks ship before being broken up for scrap in 1949.

== Design and description ==
Z10 Hans Lody had an overall length of 119 meters (390 ft 5 in) and was 114 meters (374 ft 0 in) long at the waterline. The ship had a beam of 11.30 meters (37 ft 1 in), and a maximum draft of 4.23 meters (13 ft 11 in). She displaced 2,171 long tons (2,206 t) at standard load and 3,110 long tons (3,160 t) at deep load. The two Wagner geared steam turbine sets, each driving one propeller shaft, were designed to produce 70,000 metric horsepower (51,000 kW; 69,000 shp) using steam provided by six high-pressure Wagner boilers. The ship had a designed speed of 36 knots (67 km/h; 41 mph) and she reached a maximum speed of 37.8 knots from 65,000 shp (48,000 kW) during her sea trials. Hans Lody carried a maximum of 752 metric tons (740 long tons) of fuel oil which was intended to give a range of 4,400 nautical miles (8,100 km; 5,100 mi) at a speed of 19 knots (35 km/h; 22 mph), but the ship proved top-heavy in service and 30% of the fuel had to be retained as ballast low in the ship. The effective range proved to be only 1,530 nmi (2,830 km; 1,760 mi) at 19 knots. The crew numbered 10 officers and 315 enlisted men, plus an additional four officers and 19 enlisted men if serving as a flotilla flagship.

The ship carried five 12.7-centimeter (5 in) SK C/34 guns in single mounts with gun shields, two each superimposed, fore and aft. The fifth gun was carried on top of the aft superstructure. Her anti-aircraft armament consisted of four 3.7-centimeter (1.5 in) SK C/30 guns in two twin mounts abreast the rear funnel and six 2-centimeter (0.8 in) C/30 guns in single mounts. Hans Lody carried eight above-water 53.3-centimeter (21.0 in) torpedo tubes in two power-operated mounts. A pair of reload torpedoes were provided for each mount. Four depth charge throwers were mounted on the sides of the rear deckhouse and they were supplemented by six racks for individual depth charges on the sides of the stern. Enough depth charges were carried for either two or four patterns of 16 charges each. Mine rails could be fitted on the rear deck that had a maximum capacity of 60 mines. A system of passive hydrophones designated as 'GHG' (Gruppenhorchgerät) was fitted to detect submarines and the S-Gerät active sonar system was scheduled to be installed during February 1940.

During the war the ship's light anti-aircraft armament was augmented several times. In 1941, improved 2 cm C/38 guns replaced the original C/30 guns and three additional guns were added. The two guns on the aft shelter deck were replaced at some point by a single 2 cm quadruple Flakvierling mount, probably in 1942. During her 1944–45 refit, Hans Lody received the "Barbara" anti-aircraft refit in which all of her existing 3.7 cm and most of her 2 cm guns were replaced. She retained her Flakvierling mount and the remainder of her anti-aircraft armament now consisted of seven twin 3.7 cm SK M/42 mounts and three twin 2 cm mounts.

== Construction and career ==
Z10 Hans Lody, named after naval reservist Carl Hans Lody who was executed by the British as a spy during World War I, was ordered on 4 August 1934 and laid down at Germaniawerft, Kiel, on 1 April 1935 as yard number G536. She was launched on 14 May 1936 and completed on 13 September 1938. The destroyer was assigned to the 8th Destroyer Division (8. Zerstörerdivision) upon completion and participated in the homecoming celebrations for the Condor Legion on 30 May 1939 under her first commander, Lieutenant Commander (Korvettenkapitän) Karl-Jesko von Puttkamer.

When World War II began in September 1939, Hans Lody was initially deployed in the Baltic to operate against the Polish Navy and to enforce a blockade of Poland, but she was soon transferred to the German Bight where she joined her sisters in laying defensive minefields. While loading mines on 4 September, one exploded aboard Hans Lody, killing two crewmen and wounded six others, and slightly damaging the ship's stern. The ship later patrolled the Skagerrak to inspect neutral shipping for contraband goods, losing one man overboard and three injured during a storm at the end of October. On the night of 18/19 November, Commander (Fregattenkapitän) Erich Bey, in his flagship Z15 Erich Steinbrinck, led Z16 Friedrich Eckoldt and Hans Lody, in laying a minefield off the Humber Estuary that claimed another seven ships of 38,710 Gross Register Tons (GRT), including the Polish ocean liner MS Piłsudski of 14,294 GRT.

Bey, now using Hans Lody as his flagship, left port on the morning of 6 December with Z12 Erich Giese and Z11 Bernd von Arnim to lay a minefield off Cromer. The latter ship had severe boiler problems and was ordered to return to port in the late afternoon while the other two continued their mission. They spotted several darkened ships as they approached their destination, including the destroyers HMS Juno and HMS Jersey, but were not spotted in return. As the two German destroyers withdrew after having laid their mines, they spotted the two British destroyers again at a range of 8,000 meters (8,700 yd) and closed to attack. When the range dropped to 4,600 meters (5,000 yd), Lody fired three torpedoes at Juno, the leading British ship, while Giese fired four at Jersey. None of Lody's torpedoes struck their target, but one of Giese's hit Jersey abreast her aft torpedo mount. The torpedo detonated in an oil fuel tank and started a major fire. Neither British ship spotted the German destroyers and they continued on while Juno turned about to help her sister. Two British ships totalling 5,286 GRT were sunk by this minefield. Hans Lody began a refit at Wesermünde on 9 December that was not finished until 22 May 1940.

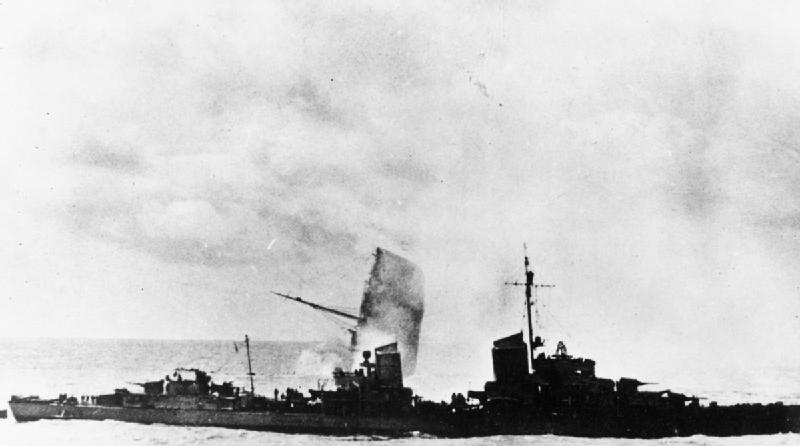
Hans Lody stopping to rescue survivors from the transport SS Orama, 8 June 1940. The bow of the latter ship can be seen raised above the water behind the destroyer.

In June Hans Lody was tasked to escort the battleships Scharnhorst and Gneisenau, as well as the heavy cruiser Admiral Hipper, in Operation Juno, a planned attack on Harstad, Norway, to relieve pressure on the German garrison at Narvik. The ships sortied on 8 June and sank the troop transport Orama, the oil tanker Oil Pioneer and the minesweeping trawler Juniper en route, Hans Lody delivering the coup de grâce on the first two of these. The German commander, Admiral Wilhelm Marschall, then ordered the Admiral Hipper and all four destroyers to Trondheim because of the heavy weather, where they arrived in the morning of 9 June. The two battleships continued the sortie and sank the aircraft carrier Glorious and her two escorting destroyers, although Scharnhorst was badly damaged by a torpedo from the destroyer Acasta in the engagement. The battleship was escorted home by Hans Lody and her sisters Steinbrinck and Z7 Hermann Schoemann for repairs. The destroyer was lightly damaged during an air raid on 13 June, but was back in service a week later. She returned to Norway in time to screen the crippled Gneisenau as she returned to Kiel on 25 July, suffering a minor collision with the battleship en route.

Hans Lody transferred to France on 9 September in preparation for Operation Sealion, the planned invasion of Great Britain. Now based at Brest, the ship helped to lay a minefield in Falmouth Bay during the night of 28/29 September. Five ships totalling only 2,026 GRT were sunk by this minefield. During a Royal Air Force air raid on Brest on 10 October, Hans Lody was slightly damaged by bomb splinters and strafing, losing two crewmen killed and seven wounded during the attack. Bey led Hans Lody and four other destroyers during a sortie for the Southwest Approaches on 17 October and were intercepted by a British force of two light cruisers and five destroyers. The British opened fire at extreme range and were forced to disengage in the face of long-range torpedo volleys and attacks by Luftwaffe bombers without having hit any of the German ships. On the night of 24–25 November, Hans Lody and the destroyers Z4 Richard Beitzen and Z20 Karl Galster sortied from Brest, bound for the Land's End area. En route they encountered some fishing ships south-west of Wolf Rock and engaged them with gunfire with little effect. The German ships then spotted a small convoy and sank one of the three merchantmen and damaged another. The flash from the guns alerted the five destroyers of the British 5th Destroyer Flotilla, but they could not intercept the German destroyers before dawn. Three nights later the German ships sortied again for the same area. They encountered two tugboats and a barge, but only sank one of the former and the barge, totaling 424 GRT. This time the 5th Destroyer Flotilla was able to intercept around 06:30 on 29 November. The Germans opened fire first, each destroyer firing four torpedoes, of which only two from Hans Lody hit their target, HMS Javelin. The torpedoes hit at each end of the ship and blew off her bow and stern, but the British were able to tow her home. Hans Lody was hit by two 2-pounder (40 mm) shells during the engagement, but suffered no casualties. The ship returned home on 5 December for a refit in Wesermünde that lasted until April 1941.

=== 1941–1942 ===
She was one of the escorts for the battleship Bismarck and the heavy cruiser Prinz Eugen from Cape Arkona to Trondheim on 19–22 May as they sortied into the North Atlantic. The following month, Hans Lody escorted the heavy cruiser Lützow from Kiel to Norway as the latter ship attempted to break through the British blockade. Several Bristol Beaufort aircraft spotted Lützow and her escorts en route and one managed to surprise the ships and torpedo the cruiser early on the morning of 13 June, forcing her to return to Germany for repairs. Z10 Hans Lody was then sent to Kirkenes, Norway, in July. Now a part of the 6th Destroyer Flotilla (6. Zerstörerflottille), she participated in a sortie on 12–13 July that sank two small Soviet ships at the cost of expending 80% of their ammunition. Her participation in another sortie on 22 July had to be cancelled due to condenser problems. When the British aircraft carriers Victorious and Furious attacked Petsamo and Kirkenes on 29 July, the destroyers were far to the east and could not catch the British ships before they left the area. The German destroyers sortied into the Kola Inlet on 9 August where they sank one small Soviet patrol vessel. The flotilla was now assigned to escort convoys between Tromsø and Kirkenes; during one of these missions, the submarine Trident sank two troop-carrying freighters, Bahia Laura and Donau II despite the destroyers. Hans Lody depth-charged Trident without significant effect and rescued 38 survivors from the two ships. The ship departed for Germany for repairs to her boilers on 27 September.

After repairs were completed, she screened Lützow during her voyage to Trondheim 15–20 May 1942 and laid a minefield in the Skaggerak en route. Hans Lody was damaged when a valve was left open and flooded the starboard engine room in early June and required two weeks to be repaired. She was one of four destroyers assigned to escort the battleship Tirpitz during Operation Rösselsprung (Knight's Move), an attack on the Russia-bound Convoy PQ 17. The ships sailed from Trondheim on 2 July for the first stage of the operation, although three of the destroyers, including Hans Lody, assigned to Tirpitz's escort ran aground in the dark and heavy fog and were forced to return to port for repairs. After temporary repairs, she was towed back to Kiel for permanent repairs on 25 July. Three days later the ships were attacked without effect by three Beaufort torpedo bombers. Korvettenkapitän Karl-Adolf Zenker assumed command in August. The dockyard estimated the time to repair Hans Lody at six months or more and the Kriegsmarine gave serious consideration to decommissioning her as uneconomical to repair, but was persuaded to repair her anyway.

=== 1943–1949 ===
By 1943, the ship had received a FuMO 21 (Note: Funkmess-Ortung (Radio-direction finder, active ranging)) search radar. During sea trials on 15 February 1943, a fire broke out in an engine room; repairs were not completed until 22 April and the ship then returned to Norway. In September the ship participated in Operation Zitronella, ferrying troops of the 349th Grenadier Regiment (Grenadier-Regiment) of the 230th Infantry Division to destroy Norwegian facilities on the island of Spitzbergen, together with Tirpitz and the battleship Scharnhorst, escorted by eight other destroyers. While successful, the operation was primarily intended to boost the morale of the ships stationed in the Arctic when fuel shortages limited their activities and the Allies reestablished the bases five weeks later. Hans Lody and her sisters then spent the next six months in southern Norway laying minefields at the entrance to the Skaggerak and escorting convoys to and from Norway. She was ordered to Kiel at the end of April 1944 for a lengthy refit that lasted until February 1945. Sometime in 1944, the ship had her radar replaced by a FuMO 24 search radar and her foremast was rebuilt in a goal-post shape to allow the 6-by-2-meter (19.7 ft × 6.6 ft) antenna to fully rotate. A FuMO 63 K Hohentwiel radar replaced the searchlight on its platform abaft the rear funnel. After working up, the ship was assigned convoy escort duties in the Skaggerak on 5 April. A month later, Hans Lody departed Copenhagen to load refugees at the Hela Peninsula in East Prussia; she had about 1,500 aboard when she returned on 7 May. The ship sailed to Kiel the next day and was decommissioned on 9 May.

The Royal Navy assumed control of her the following day and sailed her to Wilhelmshaven where she waited while the Allies decided on the disposition of the captured ships. She was allocated to Britain at the end of 1945 and arrived at Portsmouth on 7 January 1946 where she was allocated the pennant number of R38, later H40. The ship was initially used to familiarize the British on her high-pressure boilers until October when she was used as accommodation ship in Southampton. Hans Lody arrived at Sunderland under tow on 17 July 1949 to be broken up.
