= German destroyer Z7 Hermann Schoemann =

Type 1934A-class destroyer

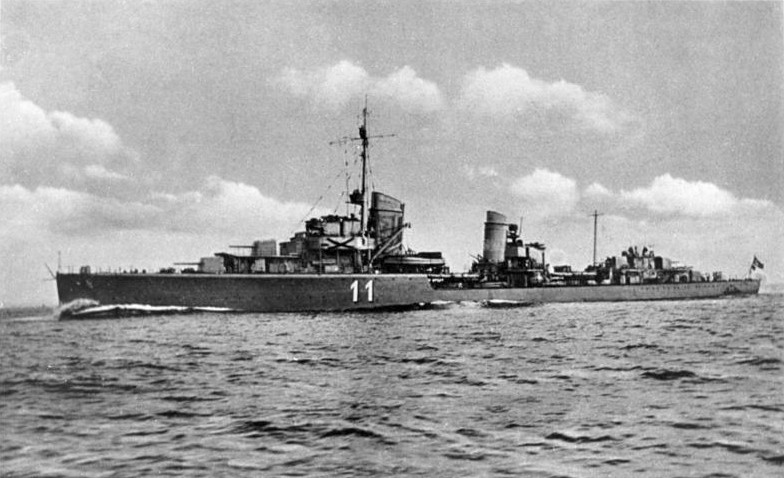
- Sister ship Z4 Richard Beitzen underway, 1937

History

Nazi Germany
- Name: Z7 Hermann Schoemann
- Namesake: Hermann Schoemann
- Ordered: 9 January 1935
- Builder: DeSchiMAG, Bremen
- Yard number: W901
- Laid down: 15 July 1935
- Launched: 24 March 1936
- Completed: 29 June 1937
- Fate: Scuttled, 2 May 1942

General characteristics (as built)
- Class & type: Type 1934A-class destroyer
- Displacement: 2,171 long tons (2,206 t) (standard); 3,110 long tons (3,160 t) (deep load)
- Length: 119 m (390 ft 5 in) o/a; 114 m (374 ft 0 in) w/l
- Beam: 11.30 m (37 ft 1 in)
- Draft: 4.23 m (13 ft 11 in)
- Installed power: 70,000 PS (51,000 kW; 69,000 shp); 6 × water-tube boilers
- Propulsion: 2 shafts, 2 × geared steam turbines
- Speed: 36 knots (67 km/h; 41 mph)
- Range: 1,530 nmi (2,830 km; 1,760 mi) at 19 knots (35 km/h; 22 mph)
- Complement: 325
- Armament: 5 × single 12.7 cm (5 in) guns; 2 × twin 3.7 cm (1.5 in) AA guns; 6 × single 2 cm (0.8 in) AA guns; 2 × quadruple 53.3 cm (21 in) torpedo tubes; 60 mines; 32–64 depth charges, 4 throwers and 6 individual racks

Service record
- Commanders: Theodor Detmers

Z7 Hermann Schoemann was a Type 1934A-class destroyer built for Nazi Germany's Kriegsmarine in the mid-1930s. The ship was plagued by machinery problems for most of her life and was under repair when the Second World War began in September 1939. She covered her sister ships over the next few months as they laid offensive minefields in English waters in late 1939 – early 1940. Hermann Schoemann played a minor role in the Norwegian Campaign as engine problems limited her availability throughout 1940 and for most of 1941.

She was transferred to France in early 1942 to escort two battleships and a heavy cruiser home to Germany through the English Channel in the Channel Dash. The ship was then transferred to Norway where she participated in Operation Sportpalast (Sports Palace), an unsuccessful attempt to intercept Convoy QP 8 returning from Russia. Another unsuccessful intercept was made in early April before the Germans were successful with Convoy QP 11 at the end of the month. The convoy's escorts conducted a skilful defense and prevented Hermann Schoemann and the other two destroyers from sinking more than one Soviet freighter. The German commander broke off the action in the hopes of locating the crippled light cruiser HMS Edinburgh. They found the cruiser and her escorting destroyers on 2 May; Edinburgh disabled Hermann Schoemann before she could fire any torpedoes and her captain was forced to scuttle her shortly afterwards. The destroyer had 8 men killed and 45 wounded in the engagement.

== Design and description ==
Hermann Schoemann had an overall length of 119 meters (390 ft 5 in) and was 114 meters (374 ft 0 in) long at the waterline. The ship had a beam of 11.30 meters (37 ft 1 in), and a maximum draft of 4.23 meters (13 ft 11 in). She displaced 2,171 long tons (2,206 t) at standard load and 3,110 long tons (3,160 t) at deep load. The two Wagner geared steam turbine sets, each driving one propeller shaft, were designed to produce 70,000 PS (51,000 kW; 69,000 shp) using steam provided by six high-pressure Wagner boilers. The ship had a designed speed of 36 knots (67 km/h; 41 mph) and she reached a maximum speed of 36.8 knots from 66,000 shp (49,000 kW) while testing various propellers. Hermann Schoemann carried a maximum of 752 metric tons (740 long tons) of fuel oil which was intended to give a range of 4,400 nautical miles (8,100 km; 5,100 mi) at a speed of 19 knots (35 km/h; 22 mph), but the ship proved top-heavy in service and 30% of the fuel had to be retained as ballast low in the ship. The effective range proved to be only 1,530 nmi (2,830 km; 1,760 mi) at 19 knots. The crew numbered 10 officers and 315 enlisted men, plus an additional four officers and 19 enlisted men if serving as a flotilla flagship.

The ship carried five 12.7-centimeter (5 in) SK C/34 guns in single mounts with gun shields, two each superimposed, fore and aft. The fifth gun was carried on top of the aft superstructure. Her anti-aircraft armament consisted of four 3.7-centimeter (1.5 in) SK C/30 guns in two twin mounts abreast the rear funnel and six 2-centimeter (0.8 in) C/30 guns in single mounts. Hermann Schoemann carried eight above-water 53.3-centimeter (21.0 in) torpedo tubes in two power-operated mounts. A pair of reload torpedoes were provided for each mount. Four depth charge throwers were mounted on the sides of the rear deckhouse and they were supplemented by six racks for individual depth charges on the sides of the stern. Enough depth charges were carried for either two or four patterns of 16 charges each. Mine rails could be fitted on the rear deck that had a maximum capacity of 60 mines. A system of passive hydrophones designated as 'GHG' (Gruppenhorchgerät) was fitted to detect submarines and the S-Gerät active sonar system was scheduled to be installed during March 1940.

== Construction and career ==
Z7 Hermann Schoemann, named after Lieutenant (Kapitänleutnant) Hermann Schoemann, was ordered on 9 January 1935 and laid down at DeSchiMAG, Bremen on 7 September 1935 as yard number W901. She was launched on 16 July 1936 and completed on 9 September 1937 under the command of Lieutenant Commander (Korvettenkapitän) Erich Schulte Mönting. The ship participated in the late 1937 naval maneuvers as part of the 2nd Destroyer Division (2. Zerstörer-Division). Hermann Schoemann hosted Adolf Hitler and his retinue for a short cruise from Kiel to Eckernförde in July 1938 and participated in the August Fleet Review and the following fleet exercise. Korvettenkapitän Theodor Detmers relieved Schulte-Mönting in October. The division accompanied the heavy cruiser Admiral Graf Spee on her voyage to the Mediterranean in October where they visited Vigo, Tangiers, and Ceuta before returning home. The destroyer had a lengthy refit at Wilhelmshaven from February 1939 to October.

Hermann Schoemann patrolled the Skagerrak to inspect neutral shipping for contraband goods in October. The ship attempted to lay a minefield off the British coast on the night of 12/13 November, with two of her sisters, but had to turn back after she and Z6 Theodor Riedel suffered machinery breakdowns. She made another attempt on the night of 18 December to mine the Humber estuary, together with two other destroyers, but the German ships had to abandon the sortie when they could not pinpoint their location. While patrolling in the Jade estuary on 23 December, she collided with her sister Z15 Erich Steinbrinck in a heavy fog. Hermann Schoemann covered minelaying sorties in January and February 1940, but spent most of March under repair for machinery problems.

The ship was allocated to Group 2 for the Norwegian portion of Operation Weserübung. The group's task was to transport the 138th Mountain Infantry Regiment (138. Gebirgsjäger Regiment) of the 3rd Mountain Division to seize Trondheim together with Admiral Hipper, but her machinery broke down again before the troops were loaded and she was replaced by Friedrich Eckoldt. As part of the post-Narvik reorganization of the Kriegsmarine's destroyer forces, Hermann Schoemann was assigned to the 6th Destroyer Flotilla (6. Zerstörer Flotille). In June the flotilla was tasked to escort the battleships Scharnhorst and Gneisenau, as well as the heavy cruiser Admiral Hipper in Operation Juno, a planned attack on Harstad, Norway, to relieve pressure on the German garrison at Narvik. The ships sortied on 8 June and sank the troop transport Orama, the oil tanker Oil Pioneer and the minesweeping trawler Juniper en route. The German commander, Admiral Wilhelm Marschall, then ordered the Admiral Hipper and all four destroyers to Trondheim because of the heavy weather, where they arrived in the morning of 9 June. The two battleships continued the sortie and sank the aircraft carrier Glorious and her two escorting destroyers, although Scharnhorst was badly damaged by a torpedo from the destroyer Acasta in the engagement. The battleship was escorted home by the destroyers Steinbrinck, Z10 Hans Lody and Hermann Schoemann for repairs. On 25 June, Hermann Schoemann began a lengthy refit that lasted until 15 February 1941, although her machinery continued to be problematic.

=== 1942 ===
She was declared operational in June and transferred to Kirkenes, Norway, the following month. However, continued machinery problems forced her return to Germany in August and repairs that lasted until January 1942. Now assigned to the 5th Destroyer Flotilla (5. Zerstörer Flotille), Hermann Schoemann sailed from Kiel on 24 January for France as part of the preparations for the Channel Dash. On the evening of 25 January, Z8 Bruno Heinemann struck two mines laid by HMS Plover off the Belgian coast and sank. The survivors were put ashore at Le Havre before the flotilla reached Brest on the 26th. The German ships departed on the evening of 11 February and the nighttime and morning portion of the transit through the English Channel was uneventful. In the afternoon, however, Hermann Schoemann twice drove off British Motor Torpedo Boats, together with her sister Z14 Friedrich Ihn. British aircraft began to make their presence known with repeated attacks on the German ships. Hermann Schoemann was repeatedly struck in the stern by 20 mm cannon shells from defending German fighters and/or No. 452 Squadron RAAF Spitfires. Later that afternoon, Vice Admiral (Vizeadmiral) Otto Ciliax, commander of the battleship flotilla, was transferred to the ship after his temporary flagship, the destroyer Z29, was disabled by a premature detonation in one of her guns that sent shrapnel into the machinery spaces.

Shortly afterwards, Hermann Schoemann joined four other destroyers in escorting the heavy cruisers Prinz Eugen and Admiral Scheer to Trondheim. Heavy weather forced three of the destroyers to return to port before reaching Trondheim and Prinz Eugen was torpedoed and badly damaged by the submarine HMS Trident on 23 February after their separation. On 6 March, the battleship Tirpitz, escorted by Hermann Schoemann and three other destroyers, sortied from Trondheim to attack the returning Convoy QP 8 and the Russia-bound PQ 12 as part of Operation Sportpalast. The following morning, Ciliax ordered the destroyers to search independently for Allied ships and they stumbled across the 2,815-gross register ton (GRT) Soviet freighter Ijora, a straggler from QP 8, later that afternoon and sank her. Tirpitz rejoined them shortly afterwards and they continued to fruitlessly search for Allied shipping until they sailed for the Vestfjorden on the 9th.

On 9 April, the ship was transferred to the 8th Destroyer Flotilla (8. Zerstörer Flotille) in Kirkenes. Together with the destroyers Z24 and Z25, Hermann Schoemann sortied to intercept Convoy QP 14 two days later, but failed to locate any Allied ships in heavy snow and low visibility. The trio sortied again on 30 April to intercept the westbound Convoy QP 11 and the crippled light cruiser HMS Edinburgh, torpedoed earlier by the German submarine U-456. They found the convoy the next day, but they only managed to sink a Soviet 2,847-GRT freighter as the convoy's four escorting destroyers repeatedly rebuffed attempts to reach the convoy's ships. Despite a significant firepower advantage, the Germans only moderately damaged HMS Amazon in the day's engagements. Captain (Kapitän zur See) Alfred Schulze-Hinrichs, commander of the flotilla, broke off the battle in the late afternoon and decided to search for the cruiser, his original objective. They found Edinburgh and her escorts on the morning of 2 May and closed to attack with torpedoes. The cruiser opened fire first and disabled Hermann Schoemann with her second salvo with hits in both engine rooms. The destroyer turned away and dropped smoke floats to create a smoke screen behind which she could hide. The damage was too severe to return to base and, as the crew prepared to abandon ship, Hermann Schoemann was attacked by the British destroyers who hit her at least three more times. Z24 and Z25 took off about 223 survivors before the ship was scuttled by her crew at coordinates 72°20′N 35°05′E. Another 56 men were rescued by U-88 after the German destroyers broke off the engagement. During the battle 8 men were killed and another 45 wounded.
