= Courageous class =

Courageous class may refer to:

- Courageous-class aircraft carrier, ship class of the Royal Navy, the United Kingdom
- Courageous-class battlecruiser, ship class of the Royal Navy, the United Kingdom
