= Type 1934A destroyers =

Subclass of Type 1934 class destroyers

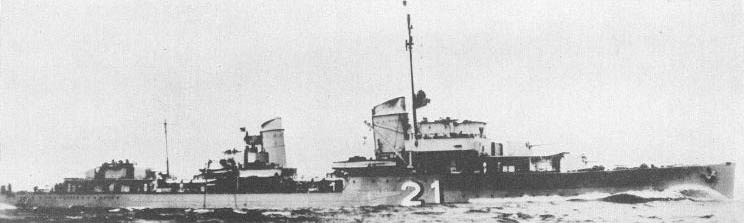
- Z5 Paul Jacobi c. 1938

Class overview
- Name: Type 1934A destroyer
- Builders: AG Weser, Bremen; Friedrich Krupp Germaniawerft, Kiel; Blohm & Voss, Hamburg
- Operators: Kriegsmarine; French Navy; Soviet Navy; Royal Navy
- Preceded by: Type 1934 destroyer
- Succeeded by: Type 1936 destroyer
- Built: 1935–1936
- In commission: 1937–1958
- Completed: 12
- Lost: 7
- Scrapped: 5

General characteristics (as built)
- Class & type: Destroyer
- Displacement: 2,171–2,270 long tons (2,206–2,306 t)
- Length: 119 m (390 ft 5 in) o/a; 116.25 m (381.4 ft) w/l
- Beam: 11.31 m (37 ft 1 in)
- Draft: 4.23 m (13 ft 11 in)
- Installed power: 70,000 PS (51,485 kW; 69,042 shp); 6 × water-tube boilers
- Propulsion: 2 shafts; 2 × steam turbines
- Speed: 36 knots (67 km/h; 41 mph)
- Range: 1,825 nmi (3,380 km; 2,100 mi) at 19 knots (35 km/h; 22 mph)
- Complement: 325
- Armament: 5 × single 12.7 cm (5 in) guns; 2 × twin 3.7 cm (1.5 in) AA guns; 6 × single 2 cm (0.79 in) AA guns; 2 × quadruple 53.3 cm (21 in) torpedo tubes; 60 mines; 4 × depth charge launchers, 6 × racks

The Type 1934A destroyers, also known as the Z5 class, were a group of twelve destroyers built in the mid-1930s for Nazi Germany's Kriegsmarine. Five survived the war.

== Design and description ==
The Type 1934A destroyers were repeats of the Type 1934 class with a modified bow to improve seakeeping that was only partially successful at best. A staukeil, a short keel that had a shallow wedge-shaped cross-section, was added under their transoms, in order to improve their turning circles and raise their sterns at high speed. This had the effect, however, of forcing the bow deeper into the water which aggravated the lack of sheer forward, throwing spray over the bridge, making No. 1 gun impossible to work and the upper deck hazardous to walk upon. A more serious problem was that it caused a continuous sagging force on the hull which required the reinforcement of the amidships hull plates to prevent cracking. They still retained the over-complicated and troublesome boilers of the earlier ships

The ships had an overall length of 119 meters (390 ft 5 in) and were 116.25 meters (381.4 ft) long at the waterline. They had a beam of 11.31 meters (37 ft 1 in), and a maximum draft of 4.23 meters (13 ft 11 in). They displaced 2,171–2,270 long tons (2,206–2,306 t) at standard load and 3,110–3,190 long tons (3,160–3,240 t) at deep load. The destroyers had a metacentric height of 0.79 meters (2 ft 7 in) at deep load. They were divided into 15 watertight compartments of which the middle 7 contained the propulsion and auxiliary machinery and were protected by a double bottom that protected the middle 47% of the ships' length. Active stabilizers were fitted to reduce roll. They had a complement of 10 officers and 315 enlisted men, plus an additional 4 officers and 19 enlisted men if serving as a flotilla flagship.

The Type 1934As were powered by two Wagner geared steam turbine sets, each driving a single three-bladed 3.25-meter (10 ft 8 in) propeller using steam provided by six high-pressure Wagner or Benson water-tube boilers with superheaters. The Wagner boilers had a pressure of 70 kg/cm^{2} (6,865 kPa; 996 psi) and a working temperature of 460 °C (860 °F) while the Benson boilers used 110 kg/cm^{2} (10,787 kPa; 1,565 psi) at 510 °C (950 °F). The turbines, designed to produce 70,000 metric horsepower (51,000 kW; 69,000 shp), were intended to give the ships a speed of 36 knots (67 km/h; 41 mph). The Type 1934A carried a maximum of 752 metric tons (740 long tons) of fuel oil which was intended to give a range of 4,400 nmi (8,100 km; 5,100 mi) at 19 knots (35 km/h; 22 mph), but the ships proved top-heavy in service and 30% of the fuel had to be retained as ballast low in the ship. The effective range proved to be only 1,825 nmi (3,380 km; 2,100 mi) at 19 knots (35 km/h; 22 mph). The ships were equipped with two steam-driven 200-kilowatt (270 hp) turbogenerators, one in each engine room. The first four ships had three diesel generators, two of 60 kW (80 hp) and one of 30 kW (40 hp), while the later ships had three 50 kW (67 hp) generators, all of which were located in a compartment between the two rear boiler rooms.

The Type 1934A ships were armed with five 12.7 cm (5 in) SK C/34 guns (Note: In Kriegsmarine gun nomenclature, SK stands for Schiffskanone (ship's gun), C/32 stands for Constructionjahr (Construction year) 1932) in single mounts with gun shields. One pair each was superimposed, fore and aft of the superstructure and the fifth mount was positioned on top of the rear superstructure. They carried 600 rounds of ammunition for these guns, which had a maximum range of 17.4 kilometres (19,000 yd), and could be elevated to 30° and depressed to −10°. Their anti-aircraft armament was made up of four 3.7 cm (1.5 in) SK C/30 anti-aircraft guns in single mounts, with 8,000 rounds of ammunition, and six 2 cm (0.79 in) C/30 anti-aircraft guns in single mounts, with 12,000 rounds of ammunition. The ships carried eight above-water 53.3 cm (21 in) torpedo tubes in two power-operated mounts amidships. Four depth charge throwers were mounted on the sides of the rear deckhouse and they were supplemented by six racks for individual depth charges on the sides of the stern. Sufficient depth charges were carried for either two or four patterns of sixteen charges each. Mine rails could be fitted on the rear deck that had a maximum capacity of sixty mines. 'GHG' (Gruppenhorchgerät) passive hydrophones were fitted to detect submarines.

The Type 34As were equipped with a C/34Z analog fire-control director on the roof of the bridge that calculated the gunnery data using range estimates provided by the two 4-meter (13 ft) stereoscopic rangefinders, one abaft the rear funnel and the other just behind the director. It transmitted the bearing and elevation data to the gun crews and then fired the guns simultaneously. A 1.25-meter (4 ft 1 in) rangefinder provided data to the 3.7 cm AA guns while the 2 cm guns used a hand-held 0.7-meter (2 ft 4 in) rangefinder.

=== Modifications ===
The staukeils were removed in 1940–1942 and the stabilizers proved to be ineffective and were replaced by bilge keels as the ships were refitted. A S-Gerät active sonar system was installed on two of the destroyers by the end of 1939 and the rest were supposed to be fitted by the end of 1940. The following year the Type 34As began to receive FuMO 21 (Note: Funkmess-Ortung (Radio-direction finder, active ranging)) search radars and various models of radar detectors. These were installed in a cabin at the rear of the bridge roof, behind the rangefinder, and the radar antenna was positioned on top of the cabin roof, so close to the foremast that it could not fully revolve. The addition of 2.5 t (2.5 long tons) so high up in the ships caused stability problems. To compensate for these additions, the foremast searchlight and the aft rangefinder were removed and the forward rangefinder was replaced by a 3 m (9.8 ft) model, totaling 4.4 t (4.3 long tons). The addition of more depth charges and degaussing equipment more than offset the saving and meant that the motor boat, its derrick and the electric capstan also had to be removed, for a net addition of 3 t (3 long tons) lower in the ships. In mid- to late 1942, the surviving ships had their funnels cut down to reduce top weight.

Beginning in late 1941, the survivors had their light anti-aircraft armament augmented by a single 2 cm quadruple Flakvierling mount that replaced the two guns on the aft superstructure. More 2 cm guns were added over the course of the war and all of the survivors except Z6 Theodor Riedel exchanged a 12.7 cm gun for more 2 cm and 3.7 cm guns in the so-called "Barbara" refit in late 1944. A total of fourteen 3.7 cm and ten 2 cm guns was typical of these ships at war's end, but they varied amongst themselves significantly. Around 1944 the ships had their radars replaced by a FuMO 24 search radar and three of the five of the survivors had their foremasts rebuilt in a goal-post shape to allow the 6-by-2-meter (19.7 ft × 6.6 ft) antenna to fully rotate. A FuMO 63 K Hohentwiel radar replaced the searchlight on its platform abaft the rear funnel and FuMB 1 (Note: Funkmess-Beobachtung (Passive radio-direction finder)) Metox radar detectors were fitted on all five destroyers.

== Ships ==
List of Type 1934A destroyers
Ship	Builder	Laid down	Launched	Commissioned	Fate
Z5 Paul Jacobi	DeSchiMAG, Bremen	15 July 1935	24 March 1936	29 June 1937	Transferred to France, scrapped 1954
Z6 Theodor Riedel	DeSchiMAG, Bremen	18 July 1935	22 April 1936	2 July 1937	Transferred to France, scrapped 1958
Z7 Hermann Schoemann	DeSchiMAG, Bremen	7 September 1935	16 July 1936	9 September 1937	Sunk while attacking Convoy QP 11, 2 May 1942
Z8 Bruno Heinemann	DeSchiMAG, Bremen	14 January 1936	15 September 1936	8 January 1938	Sunk by a mine, 25 January 1942
Z9 Wolfgang Zenker	Germaniawerft, Kiel	23 March 1935	27 March 1936	2 July 1938	Scuttled during the Battles of Narvik, 13 April 1940
Z10 Hans Lody	Germaniawerft, Kiel	1 April 1935	14 May 1936	13 September 1938	Transferred to the United Kingdom, scrapped 1949
Z11 Bernd von Arnim	Germaniawerft, Kiel	26 April 1935	8 July 1936	6 December 1938	Scuttled during the Battles of Narvik, 13 April 1940
Z12 Erich Giese	Germaniawerft, Kiel	3 May 1935	12 March 1937	4 March 1939	Sunk during the Battles of Narvik, 13 April 1940
Z13 Erich Koellner	Germaniawerft, Kiel	12 October 1935	18 March 1937	28 March 1939	Sunk during the Battles of Narvik, 13 April 1940
Z14 Friedrich Ihn	Blohm & Voss, Hamburg	30 March 1935	5 November 1935	6 April 1938	Transferred to the Soviet Union, scrapped 1952
Z15 Erich Steinbrinck	Blohm & Voss, Hamburg	30 March 1935	24 September 1936	31 May 1938	Transferred to the Soviet Union, scrapped 1958
Z16 Friedrich Eckoldt	Blohm & Voss, Hamburg	14 November 1935	21 March 1937	28 July 1938	Sunk during the Battle of the Barents Sea, 31 December 1942

== Service history ==
The Type 34s spent the prewar years training and showing the flag. Z5 Paul Jacobi and Z8 Bruno Heinemann exercised off the coast of Norway where the latter evaluated 15 cm (5.9 in) guns planned for installation on the Type 1936 destroyers in April 1938. Three months later Z7 Hermann Schoemann hosted Adolf Hitler for a short tour. The following month all of the completed destroyers participated in the August Fleet Review by Hitler and the Regent of Hungary, Admiral Miklós Horthy and the following fleet exercise. Three ships accompanied the heavy cruiser Admiral Graf Spee on her voyage to the Mediterranean in October. Three others were among the escorts for the heavy cruiser Deutschland with Hitler aboard as the Germans occupied Memel, Lithuania, in March 1939. Some of the ships participated in the fleet exercise in the western Mediterranean in April and May.
