= Courageous-class aircraft carrier =

Multi-ship class of aircraft carrier

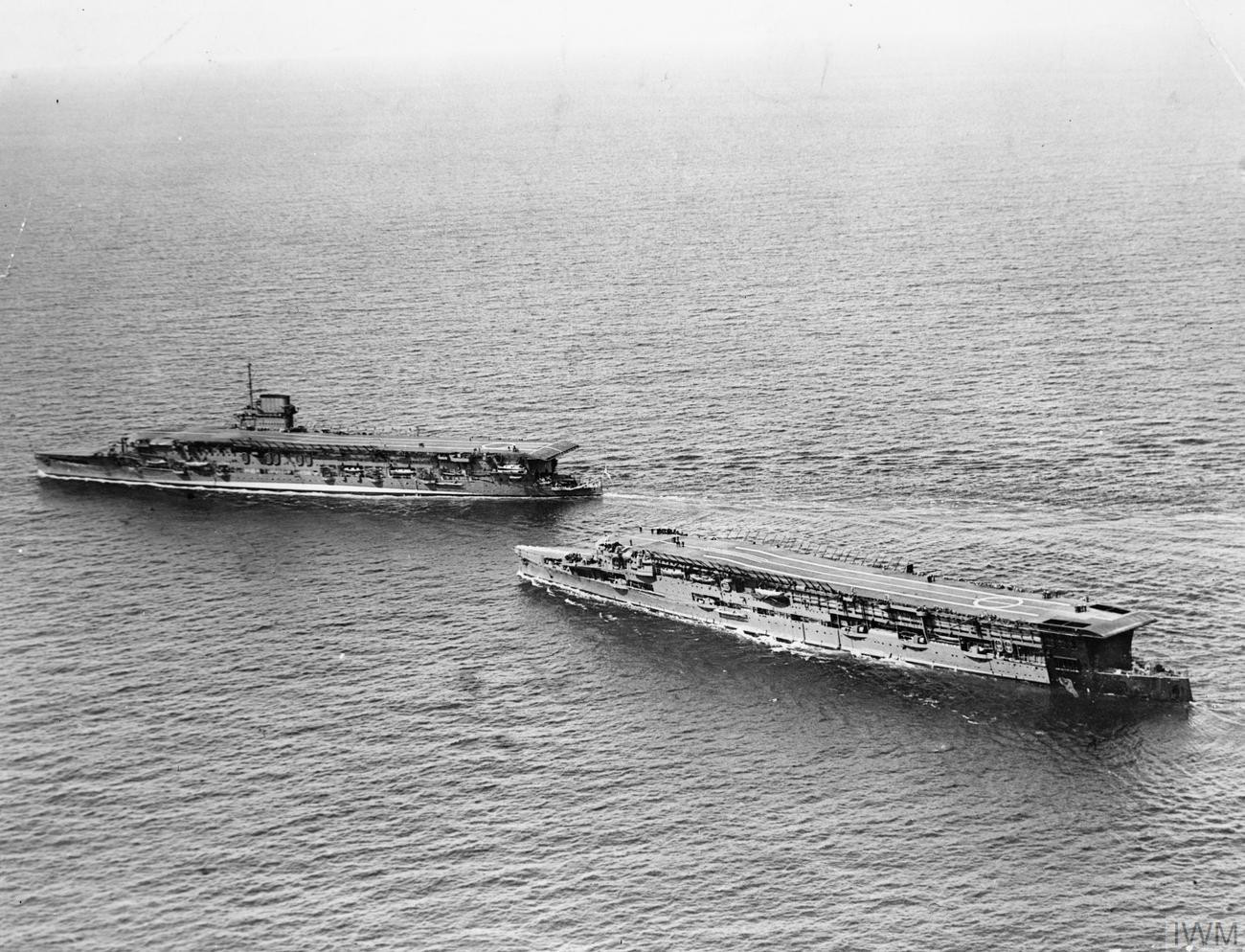
- Aerial view of Furious (right) and either Courageous or Glorious off Gibraltar, early 1930s

Class overview
- Name: Courageous class
- Operators: Royal Navy
- Preceded by: HMS Eagle
- Succeeded by: HMS Ark Royal
- Subclasses: HMS Furious
- Built: 1921–1929
- In service: 1925–1945
- Completed: 3
- Lost: 2
- Scrapped: 1

General characteristics (Glorious and Courageous as converted)
- Type: Aircraft carrier
- Displacement: 24,210 long tons (24,600 t) (normal); 26,990 long tons (27,420 t) (deep load)
- Length: 735 ft 1.5 in (224.1 m) (p/p); 786 ft 9 in (239.8 m) (o/a)
- Beam: 90 ft 6 in (27.6 m) (at waterline)
- Draught: 27.75 ft (8.5 m)
- Installed power: 18 Yarrow boilers; 90,000 shp (67,000 kW)
- Propulsion: 4 shafts; 4 geared steam turbines
- Speed: 30 knots (56 km/h; 35 mph)
- Range: 6,630 nmi (12,280 km; 7,630 mi) at 10 knots (19 km/h; 12 mph)
- Complement: 814 + 403 air group (1938)
- Armament: 16 × single 4.7 in (120 mm) anti-aircraft (AA) guns
- Armour: Belt: 2–3 in (51–76 mm); Decks: 0.75–1 in (19–25 mm); Bulkhead: 2–3 in (51–76 mm); Torpedo bulkheads: 1–1.5 in (25–38 mm)
- Aircraft carried: 48

General characteristics (Furious as converted)
- Displacement: 22,500 long tons (22,900 t); 26,500 long tons (26,900 t)
- Length: 735 ft 2.25 in (224.1 m) (p/p); 786 ft 9 in (239.8 m) (o/a)
- Beam: 88 ft (26.8 m)
- Draught: 27 ft 3 in (8.3 m)
- Installed power: 90,000 shp (67,000 kW); 18 Yarrow boilers
- Propulsion: 4 shafts, 4 geared steam turbines
- Speed: 30 knots (56 km/h; 35 mph)
- Range: 7,480 nmi (13,850 km; 8,610 mi) at 10 knots (19 km/h; 12 mph)
- Complement: 738 + 468 air group (1932)
- Armament: 10 × single 5.5 in (140 mm) guns; 6 × single 4 in (102 mm) AA guns
- Armour: Belt: 2–3 in (51–76 mm); Decks: .75–1 in (19–25 mm); Bulkhead: 2–3 in (51–76 mm); Torpedo bulkheads: 1–1.5 in (25–38 mm)
- Aircraft carried: 36

The Courageous class, sometimes called the Glorious class, was the first multi-ship class of aircraft carriers to serve with the Royal Navy. The three ships—Furious, Courageous and Glorious—were originally laid down as Courageous-class battlecruisers as part of the Baltic Project during the First World War. While very fast, their minimal armour and few guns limited their long-term utility in the post-war Royal Navy, and they were laid up after the war. They were considered capital ships by the terms of the 1922 Washington Naval Treaty and were included in the total amount of tonnage allowed to the Royal Navy. Rather than scrap them, the Navy decided to convert them to aircraft carriers as permitted under the Treaty.

Furious, already partially converted during the war, began her reconstruction in 1921, before the Treaty came into effect. In an attempt to minimise air turbulence, she was given no superstructure or island. This was not entirely satisfactory, and a small island was added in 1939. Another problem was that she lacked a standard funnel; instead, her boiler uptakes ran along the sides of the ship and exhausted out of gratings on the rear of the flight deck, or at the sides of the ship if landing operations were in progress. The long ducts reduced her aircraft capacity, and the exhaust gases were as much of a problem for landing aircraft as the turbulence would have been. Her half-sisters, Courageous and Glorious, began their conversions to aircraft carriers as Furious neared completion. They drew upon the experience gained by the Royal Navy since Furious had been designed and incorporated an island with a funnel, increasing their aircraft capacity by one-third and making it safer to land.

As the first large carrier completed by the Royal Navy, Furious was extensively used to evaluate aircraft handling and landing procedures, including the first-ever carrier night landing in 1926. Courageous became the first warship lost by the Royal Navy in the Second World War when she was torpedoed in September 1939 by a German submarine. Glorious participated in the Norwegian campaign in 1940, but she was sunk by two German battleships in June as she sailed home with a minimal escort. Furious participated in many major operations during the war, including the Norwegian campaign in 1940, the Malta Convoys and Operation Torch in 1942, and airstrikes on the German battleship Tirpitz and other targets in Norway in 1944. The ship was worn out by 1944 and was placed in reserve status in September 1944 before being paid off in 1945 and sold for scrap in 1948.

== Careers as battlecruisers ==
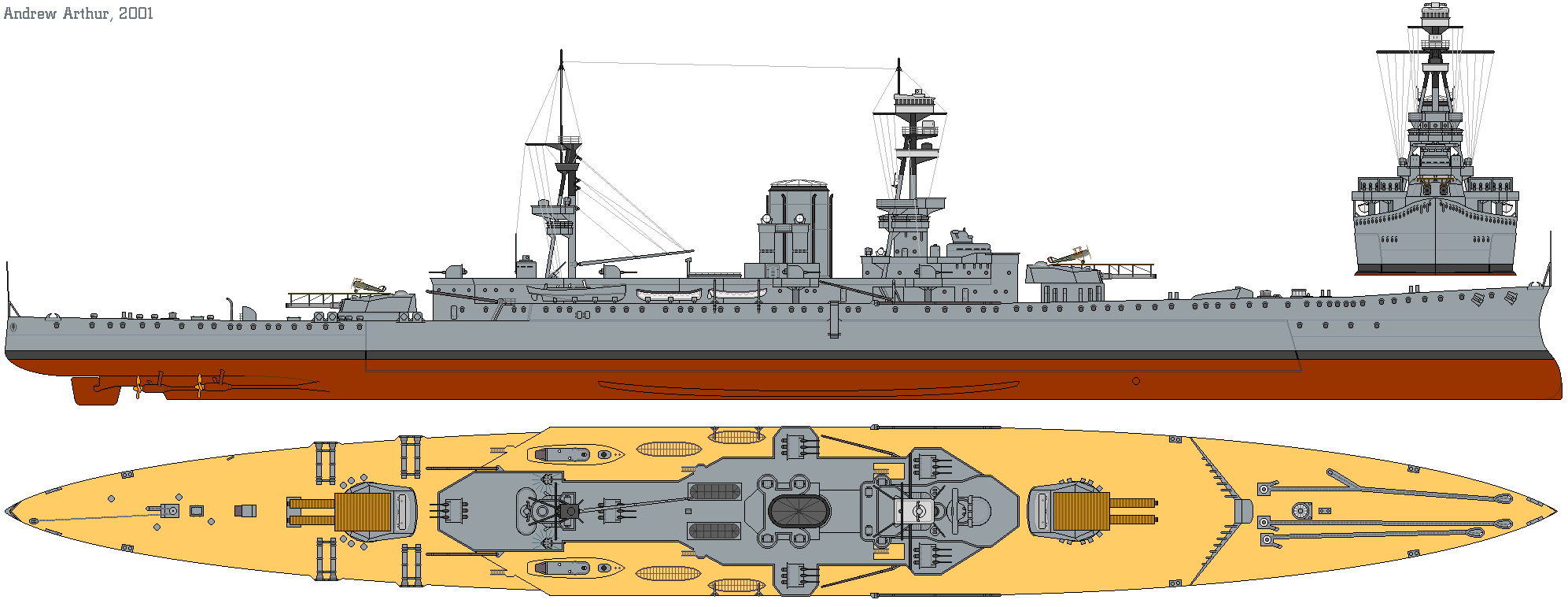
Glorious as a battlecruiser

The first two ships of the class, Courageous and Glorious, spent the First World War on North Sea patrols, climaxing in the Second Battle of Heligoland Bight in November 1917. Their half-sister Furious was designed with a pair of 18-inch (457 mm) guns—as opposed to four 15-inch (381 mm)—but was modified while being built to hold a flying-off deck and hangar in lieu of her forward turret and barbette. She made some patrols in the North Sea before her rear turret was removed and another flight deck added. Her aircraft attacked Zeppelin sheds during the Tondern raid in July 1918.

All three ships were reduced to reserve after the war. The Washington Naval Treaty of 1922 limited the signatory nations to a set amount of capital ship tonnage; all ships in excess of this figure had to be scrapped. Up to 66,000 long tons (67,000 t) of existing ships could be converted into aircraft carriers, and the Royal Navy decided to use the Courageous-class ships due to their high speed. Each ship was reconstructed with a flight deck during the 1920s.

== Conversions ==
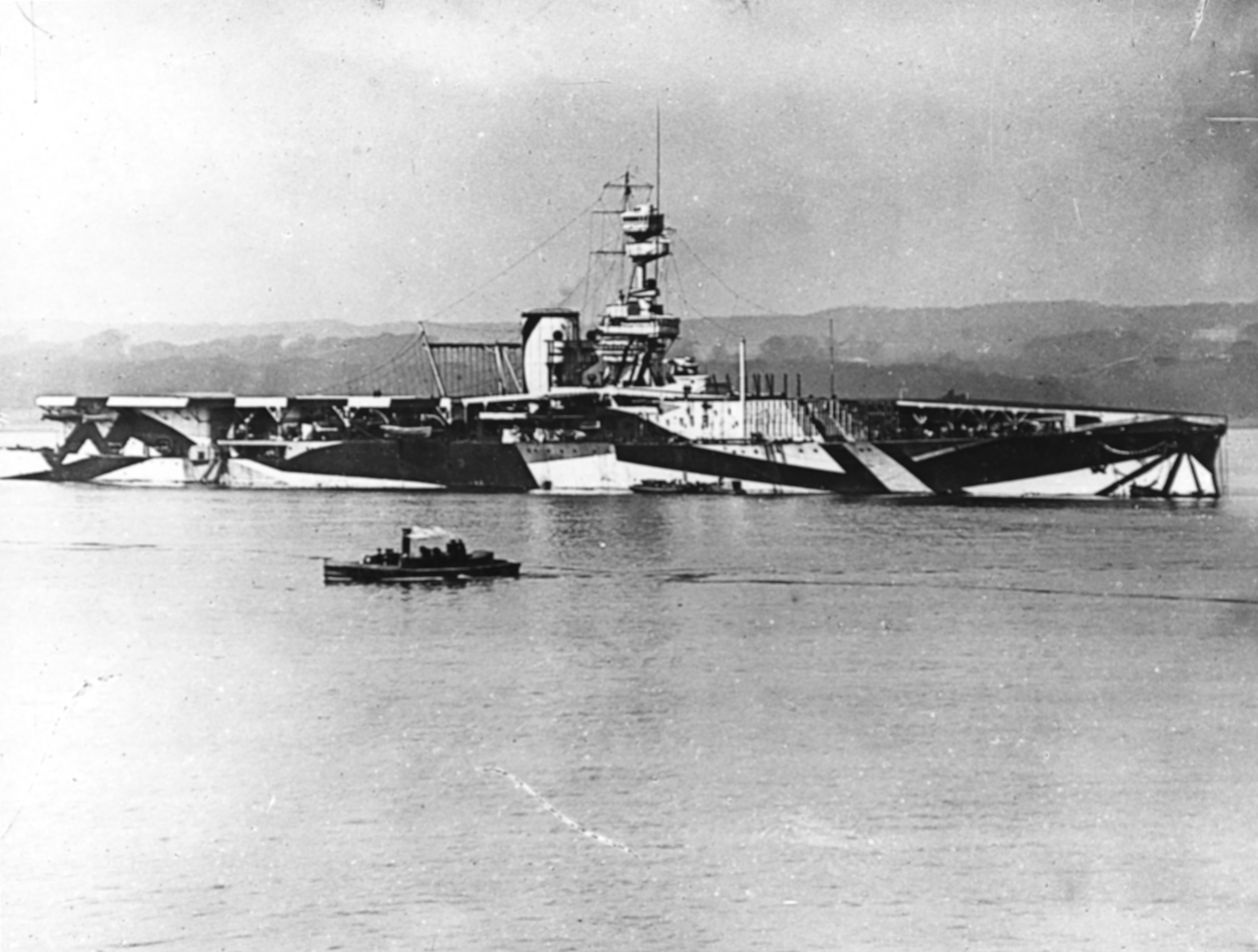
Furious as she was during the First World War with separate take-off and landing decks and superstructure in between

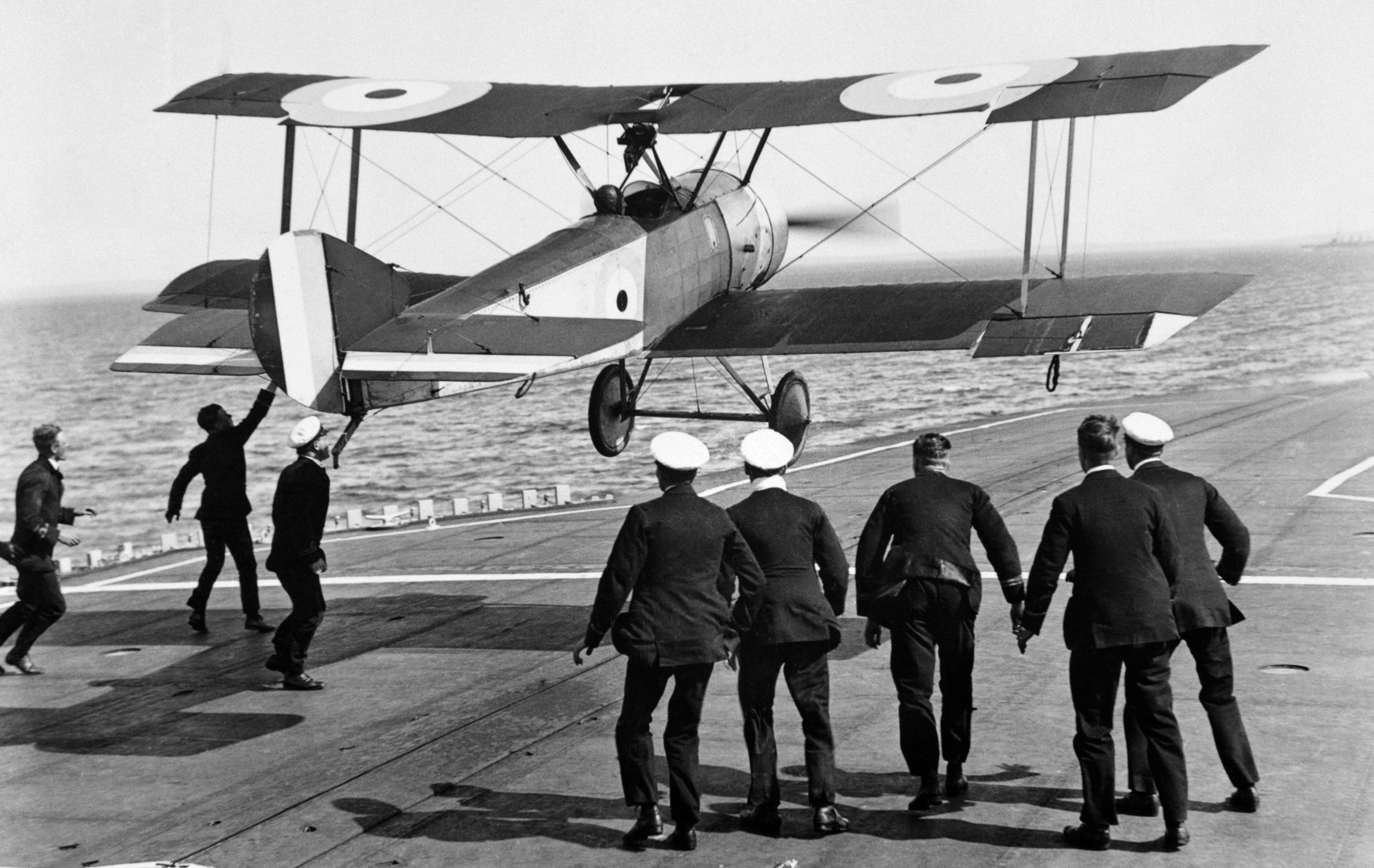
A Sopwith Pup unsuccessfully attempting to land on Furious's forward flight deck, 7 August 1917

Furious had been fitted during the First World War with a flying-off and landing deck, but the latter proved largely unusable because of the strong air currents around the superstructure and exhaust gases from the funnel. She was laid up after the war, but was converted to an aircraft carrier between June 1921 and September 1925. Her design was based on the very limited experience gained with the first two British carriers: Argus, less than three years old, and Eagle, which had carried out only 143 deck landings during preliminary sea trials in 1920.

Furious's superstructure, masts, funnel and landing deck were removed and she was given a 576-by-92-foot (175.6 by 28.0 m) flight deck that extended over three-quarters of her length. This flight deck was not level; it sloped upwards about three-quarters of the way from the stern to help slow down landing aircraft, which had no brakes at the time it was designed. That era's fore-and-aft arresting gear, initially 320 feet (97.5 m) long on Furious, was not intended to stop landing aircraft—the landing speeds of the time were low enough that this was unnecessary given a good headwind—but rather to prevent aircraft from veering off to one side and potentially falling off the flight deck. Various designs for the flight deck were tested in a wind tunnel by the National Physical Laboratory which showed that the distinctive elliptical shape and rounded edges minimised turbulence. To minimise any turbulence over the flight deck, Furious was flush-decked and lacked an island, like Argus; instead she was provided with a retractable charthouse at the forward end of the flight deck.

A two-storey hangar was built under the flight deck, each level being 15 ft (4.6 m) high. The lower hangar was 550 ft (167.6 m) long by 35–50 ft (10.7–15.2 m) wide and the upper was 520 by 50 ft (158.5 by 15.2 m). Each hangar could be sectioned off by electrically operated steel shutters on rollers. Her boilers were ducted down the side of the ship to exhaust either out of gratings at the rear of the flight deck, or, when landing operations were in progress, out of the side of the lower hangar at the rear of the ship. This solution proved to be very unsatisfactory as it consumed valuable space, made parts of the lower hangar unbearable and interfered with landing operations to a greater or lesser degree. Her original flying-off deck remained in place for use by small aircraft like fighters so that the ship could simultaneously land aircraft on the main flight deck while fighters were taking off on the lower deck and could speedily launch her aircraft from both decks. Doors at the forward end of the upper hangar opened onto the lower flying deck. Two 47-by-46-foot (14.3 by 14.0 m) lifts (elevators) were installed to transfer aircraft between the flight deck and hangars. Two 600-imperial-gallon (2,700 L; 720 US gal) ready-use petrol tanks were provided for aircraft and the ship's boats on the upper deck. An additional 20,000 imperial gallons (91,000 L; 24,000 US gal) of petrol were in bulk storage. The longitudinal arresting gear proved unpopular in service and it was ordered removed in 1927 after tests aboard Furious in 1926 had shown that deck-edge palisades were effective in reducing cross-deck gusts that could blow aircraft over the side. Furious's long exhaust ducting hampered landing operations, and restricted the size of the hangars and thus the number of aircraft that she could carry.

Glorious and Courageous were converted to aircraft carriers after Furious began her reconstruction, Courageous at Devonport starting on 29 June 1924, and Glorious at Rosyth on 14 February 1924. The latter was moved to Devonport to complete the conversion after Furious was finished. Their design was based on Furious with a few improvements based on experience gained since she was designed. All superstructure, guns, and fittings down to the main deck were removed. A two-storey hangar, each level 16 ft (4.9 m) high and 550 ft (167.6 m) long, was built on top of the remaining hull; the upper hangar level opened onto a short flying-off deck, below and forward of the main flight deck. Two slightly larger 46-by-48-foot (14.0 by 14.6 m) lifts were installed fore and aft in the flight deck. An island was added on the starboard side with the bridge, flying control station, and funnel, as an island did not create as much turbulence as had been earlier feared. By 1939 both ships could carry 34,500 imperial gallons (157,000 L; 41,400 US gal) of petrol.

== Description ==
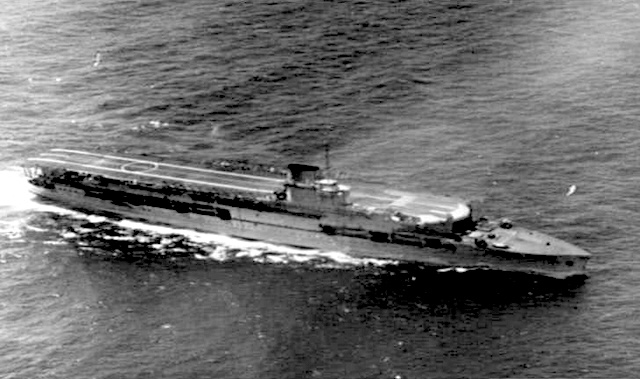
Aerial view of Glorious, 1936

The Courageous-class ships had an overall length of 786 ft 9 in (239.8 m), a beam of 90 ft 6 in (27.6 m), and a draught of 28 ft (8.5 m) at deep load. These were increases of 9 ft 6 in (2.9 m) in beam and over 2 ft (0.6 m) in draught compared to their earlier incarnations as battlecruisers. They displaced 24,210 long tons (24,600 t) at normal load and 26,990 long tons (27,420 t) at deep load, increases of over 3,000 long tons (3,000 t). Their metacentric height declined from 6 ft (1.8 m) at deep load to 4.4 ft (1.3 m) and the ships had a complete double bottom. In 1939, Courageous had a complement of 807 officers and ratings, plus 403 men in her air group.

Their half-sister Furious was the same length, but had a beam of 89 ft 0.75 in (27.1 m), and an average draught of 27 ft 3 in (8.3 m) at deep load, two feet deeper than before the conversion. She displaced 22,500 long tons (22,900 t) at normal load and 26,500 long tons (26,900 t) at deep load, over 3,000 long tons more than her previous displacement of 19,513 long tons (19,826 t) at load and 22,890 long tons (23,260 t) at deep load. Furious's metacentric height was 3.6 ft (1.1 m) at deep load, a reduction of 1.48 ft (0.5 m) after her conversion. In 1932, Furious had a complement of 738 officers and ratings, plus 468 men in her air group.

=== Propulsion ===
The Courageous-class ships were the first large warships in the Royal Navy to have geared steam turbines. Arranged in two engine rooms, each of the turbines drove one of the four propeller shafts. Furious's propellers were 11 ft 6 in (3.5 m) in diameter. The turbines were powered by 18 Yarrow small-tube boilers equally divided among three boiler rooms. The turbines were designed to produce a total of 90,000 shaft horsepower (67,000 kW) at a working pressure of 235 psi (1,620 kPa; 17 kgf/cm^{2}). No significant changes to the machinery were made during the conversion process to any of the three ships, but their increased displacement reduced their speed to approximately 30 knots (56 km/h; 35 mph).

Furious's fuel capacity was increased by 700 long tons (710 t) during her reconstruction, which increased her range to 7,480 nautical miles (13,850 km; 8,610 mi) at a speed of 10 knots (19 km/h; 12 mph). The maximum fuel capacity of Courageous and Glorious was increased during the conversion to 3,800 long tons (3,900 t) of fuel oil, giving them an endurance of 6,630 nmi (12,280 km; 7,630 mi) at 10 kn.

=== Armament ===
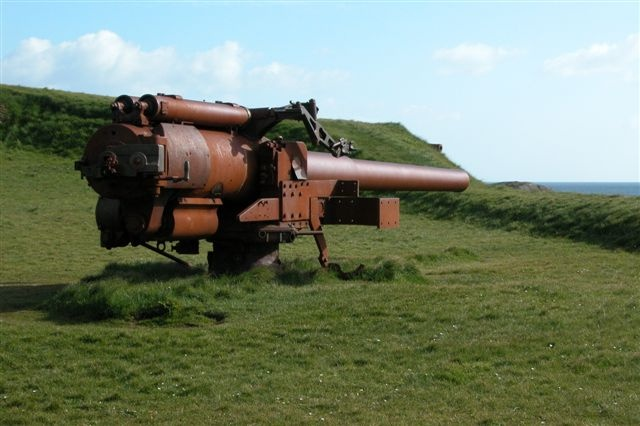
One of the 5.5-inch guns from Furious, redeployed in the Faeroes

Furious retained ten of her original eleven breech-loading BL 5.5-inch Mk I guns, five on each side, for self-defence from enemy warships. They fired 82-pound (37 kg) projectiles at a muzzle velocity of 2,790 ft/s (850 m/s). Their maximum range was 16,000 yards (15,000 m) at their maximum elevation of 25°, and the rate of fire was 12 rounds per minute.

Half a dozen QF 4-inch Mark V guns replaced her original anti-aircraft guns. Four were mounted on the sides of the flying-off deck and two on the quarterdeck. They had a maximum depression of −5° and a maximum elevation of 80°. The guns fired a 31-pound (14 kg) high explosive (HE) shell at a muzzle velocity of 2,387 ft/s (728 m/s) at a rate of 10 to 15 rounds per minute. The guns had a maximum ceiling of 31,000 ft (9,400 m), but an effective range of much less. The four guns on the flying-off deck were removed during trials of the lower flight deck in 1926–1927, but only two were replaced when the trials were concluded.

Four single QF 2-pounder pom-poms were installed by 1927. During Furious's September 1930 – February 1932 refit, her anti-aircraft outfit was changed by the substitution of two 8-barrel 2-pounder pom-pom mounts for the forward 4-inch guns on the flying-off deck removed earlier. The Mark V mount could depress to −10° and elevate to a maximum of 80°. The Mark VIII 2-pounder gun fired a 1.6-inch (40 mm) 0.91-pound (0.41 kg) shell at a muzzle velocity of 1,920 ft/s (590 m/s) to a distance of 3,800 yards (3,500 m). The gun's rate of fire was approximately 96–98 rounds per minute.

The 5.5-inch (140 mm) and 4-inch (102 mm) guns were replaced during Furious's refit in early 1939 by a dozen QF 4-inch Mk XVI guns in twin dual-purpose Mark XIX mounts. One mount each was on the former flying-off deck and the quarterdeck while the other four were mounted two per side. The Mark XIX mount could depress to −10° and elevate to a maximum of 80°. The Mark XVI gun fired fifteen to twenty 35-pound (16 kg) HE shells per minute at a muzzle velocity of 2,660 ft/s (810 m/s). Against surface targets it had a range of 19,850 yd (18,150 m) and a maximum ceiling of 31,000 ft (9,400 m), but an effective anti-aircraft range of much less. Two more Mark V 2-pounder mounts were added fore and aft of the newly added island at the same time.

During the Second World War, Furious, the only surviving ship of the three, received an eventual total of 22 manually operated automatic 20 mm Oerlikon light anti-aircraft (AA) guns, which replaced the single quadruple Vickers 0.50-calibre machine gun mount. The Oerlikon fired a 0.272-pound (0.123 kg) HE shell at a muzzle velocity of 2,750 ft/s (840 m/s). The maximum ceiling was 10,000 ft and the maximum range was 4,800 yd (4,400 m) although the effective range was under 1,000 yd (910 m). The cyclic rate of fire was 450 rounds per minute, but the practical rate was between 250 and 320 rounds per minute owing to the need to reload magazines.

A mix of single-purpose anti-surface and anti-aircraft guns in various sizes was considered for Courageous and Glorious by the Admiralty, but was ultimately rejected for a dual-purpose armament of sixteen QF 4.7-inch Mark VIII guns in single high-angle mounts. One mount was on each side of the lower flight deck and a pair were on the quarterdeck. The remaining twelve mounts were distributed along the sides of each ship. These mounts could depress to −5° and elevate to a maximum of 90°. The Mark VIII guns fired a 50-pound (23 kg) HE shell at a muzzle velocity of 2,457 ft/s (749 m/s) at a rate of 8–12 rounds per minute. The guns had a maximum ceiling of 32,000 ft (9,800 m), but an effective range of much less. They had a maximum range of 16,160 yd (14,780 m) against surface targets.

During refits in the mid-1930s, both ships received multiple 2-pounder pom-pom mounts. Courageous received three quadruple Mark VII mounts, one on each side of the flying-off deck, forward of the 4.7-inch guns, and one behind the island on the flight deck (two of these were transferred from the battleship Royal Sovereign). Glorious received three octuple Mark VI mounts in the same locations. Both ships received four water-cooled 0.50-calibre Mark III machine guns in a single quadruple mounting. This mount could depress to −10° and elevate to a maximum of 70°. The machine guns fired a 1.326-ounce (37.6 g) bullet at a muzzle velocity of 2,520 ft/s (770 m/s). This gave the gun a maximum range of about 5,000 yd (4,600 m), although its effective range was only 800 yd (730 m). Neither ship had any further guns added before they were sunk early in the war, in 1939 and 1940, respectively.

=== Fire control and radar ===
To assist its weapon systems in hitting their target, Furious was completed with one fire-control system for each side, with separate directors for low-angle and high-angle guns. The 5.5-inch guns were centrally controlled by a Dreyer Fire-Control Table on the lower deck while the 4-inch guns had their mechanical computers next to their directors. The existing fire-control directors were removed when Furious received her new dual-purpose 4-inch mountings in 1939. New high-angle directors, including two for the pom-poms, were mounted on top of the new island and on the former lower flight deck. Over the course of the war Type 285 gunnery radars were mounted on top of the high-angle directors. She also received a Type 290 air-search radar.

Courageous was initially fitted only with low-angle directors for her guns, but these were replaced by dual-purpose directors when she was refitted in 1930. (Glorious, completed later, had hers from the beginning.) Neither ship was fitted with radar before its early loss.

=== Protection ===
Little armour other than that of the barbettes was removed during their conversion to aircraft carriers. The transverse bulkheads were carried through the locations of the former barbettes. The flight deck was 0.625 inches (15.9 mm) in thickness.

Unlike other British battlecruisers, the bulk of the armour of the Courageous-class ships was made from high-tensile steel (HTS), a type of steel used structurally in other ships. Their waterline belt consisted of 2 inches (51 mm) of HTS covered by a 1-inch (25 mm) thick mild steel skin. It protected roughly the middle two-thirds of the ship with a one-inch extension forward to the two-inch forward transverse bulkhead well short of the bow. The belt had a height of 23 feet (7 m), of which 18 inches (0.5 m) was below the designed waterline. From the former forward barbette, a 3-inch bulkhead extended out to the ship's side between the upper and lower decks and a comparable bulkhead was in place at the former location of the rear barbette as well. Four decks were armoured with thicknesses varying from 0.75–3 inches (19–76 mm), thickest over the magazines and the steering gear. After the Battle of Jutland, 110 long tons (110 t) of extra protection was added to the deck around the magazines.

The torpedo bulkheads were increased during building from 0.75–1.5 in (38 mm) in thickness. All three ships were fitted with a shallow anti-torpedo bulge integral to the hull, which was intended to detonate the torpedo before it hit the hull proper and deflect the underwater explosion to the surface, away from the ship. Later testing proved that it was not deep enough to accomplish its task and that it lacked the layers of empty and full compartments that were necessary to absorb the force of the explosion.

=== Air groups ===
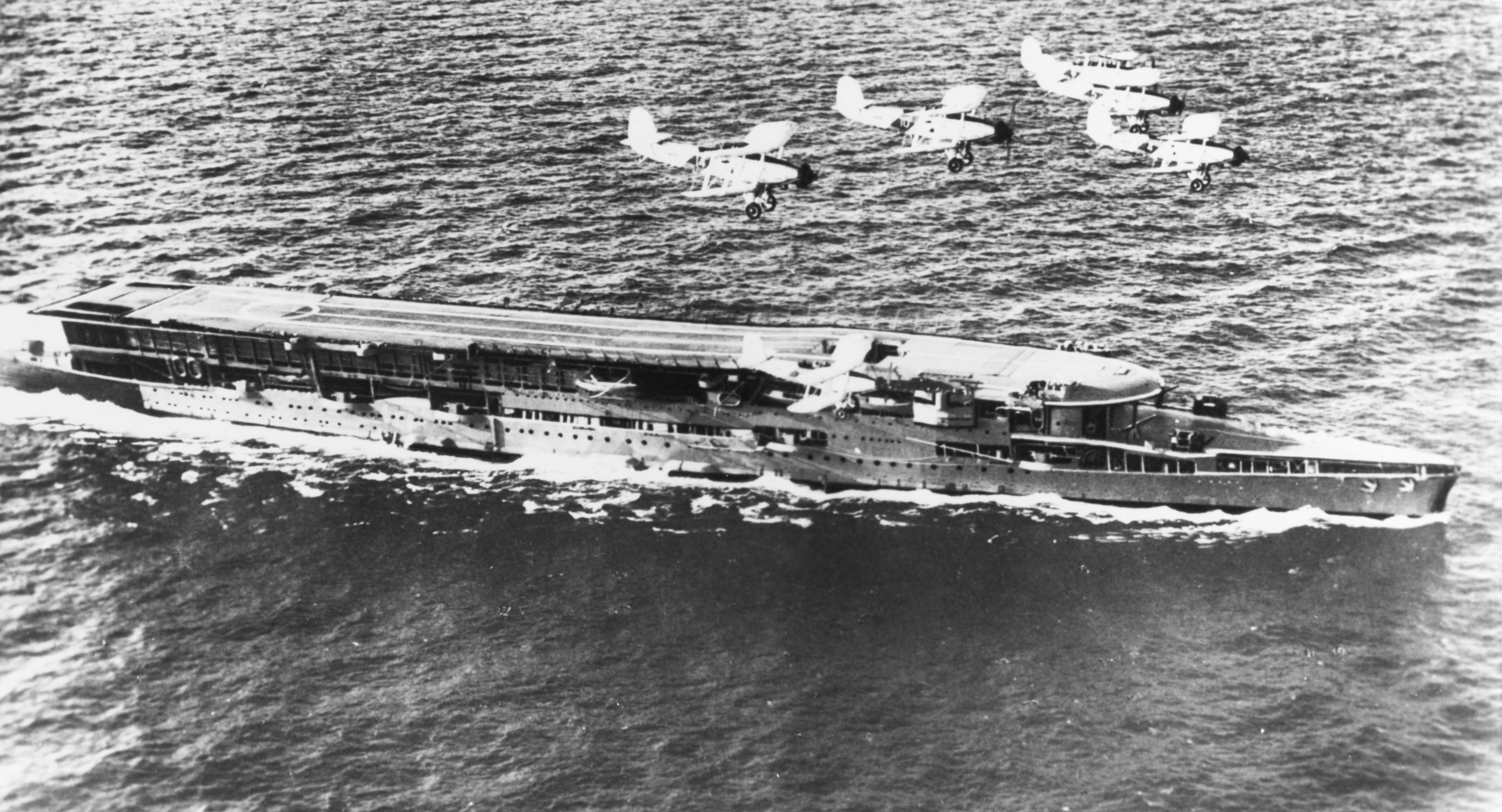
Furious in the mid-1930s with a flight of Blackburn Baffin torpedo bombers overhead

Normally, Furious could carry only about 36 aircraft. In the 1920s this commonly meant one flight (squadrons after 1932) of fighters (Fairey Flycatcher), two of spotters (Blackburn Blackburn or Avro Bison), one spotter reconnaissance (Fairey IIID) and two flights of torpedo bombers (Blackburn Dart). In 1935 there was one squadron of fighters with Hawker Nimrods and Hawker Ospreys, one squadron of Blackburn Baffin torpedo bombers and one squadron of Fairey IIIF spotters. During the Second World War, the carrier typically carried a single fighter squadron and two of strike aircraft of various types, although the mix was often adjusted for specific missions.

Courageous and Glorious were generally similar except that they carried a total of 48 aircraft. They commonly flew the same types of aircraft as Furious, although they are also known to have flown the Fairey Seal, the Blackburn Shark, and the Blackburn Ripon.

== Pre-war service ==
Furious was assigned to the Atlantic Fleet after commissioning in 1925, although she spent much of the next several years conducting trials for practically every aircraft in the Fleet Air Arm (FAA) inventory. These included landing and flying-off tests of Fairey IIID and Fairey Flycatcher floatplanes, with and without wheels, to compare various designs of wooden and metal floats. The lower flight deck was greased to allow them to take off with a minimum of difficulty. A Flycatcher fitted with wooden skids was also tested and behaved perfectly satisfactorily. The arresting gear was barely used during these trials and it was removed shortly afterwards. Deck-edge palisades (windbreaks) were installed in 1927 to keep aircraft from blowing over the side in rough weather. The first carrier night-landing was made by a Blackburn Dart on 6 May 1926 aboard Furious.

The ship was reduced to reserve status on 1 July 1930 in preparation for a lengthy overhaul at Devonport from September 1930 to February 1932, focused on refitting her machinery and re-tubing her boilers. In addition her quarterdeck was raised by one deck, the AA armament was revised and water spraying facilities were fitted in the hangars. Upon completion she ran a full-power trial on 16 February 1932 where her maximum speed was 28.8 kn (53.3 km/h; 33.1 mph) from a total of 89,754 shp (66,930 kW).

Furious was recommissioned in May 1932 as part of the Home Fleet with a reduced crew before being brought up to full complement in November. Transverse arresting gear was fitted sometime during the mid-1930s. She was detached to the Mediterranean Fleet from May to October 1934. Furious was present at the Coronation Fleet Review at Spithead on 20 May 1937 for King George VI. She became a deck-landing training carrier in 1937, although she was refitted between December 1937 and May 1938 in Devonport, where the forward end of her lower flight deck was raised to make her less wet forward. During the Munich Crisis in September 1938, she embarked Nos. 801, 821 and 822 Squadrons and joined the fleet at Scapa Flow, before resuming her training duties after the peaceful conclusion of the affair.

She was given a more extensive refit from January to May 1939 that removed her 5.5-inch guns and palisades, mounted AA guns on her flying-off deck, plated in the doors at the forward end of the upper hangar, and gave her a small island on the starboard side. Furious resumed her training duties after the completion of the refit and continued them until October 1939.

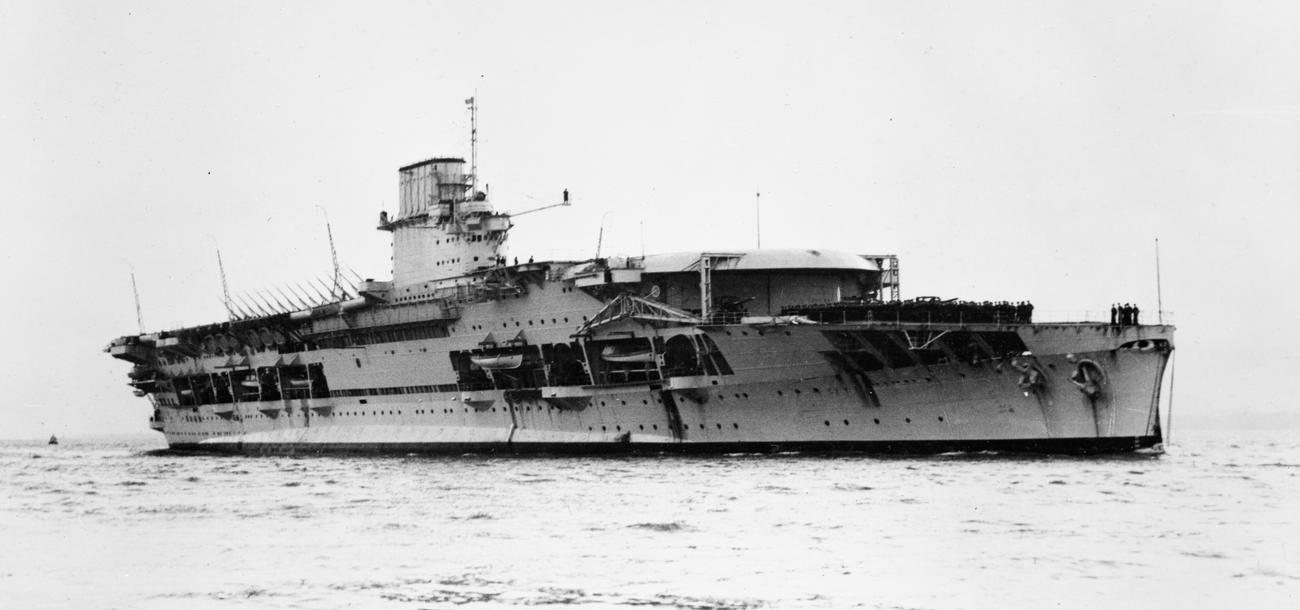
Courageous at anchor (c. 1935)

Courageous was recommissioned on 21 February 1928 and assigned to the Mediterranean Fleet from May 1928 to June 1930. She was relieved by Glorious and refitted from June to August 1930. The ship was assigned to the Atlantic and Home Fleets from 12 August 1930 to December 1938 aside from a temporary attachment to the Mediterranean Fleet in 1936. In the early 1930s, transverse arresting gear was installed and she received two hydraulic catapults on the upper flight deck before March 1934. Courageous was refitted again between October 1935 and June 1936 and received her pom-pom mounts. She was also present at the 1937 Coronation Fleet Review. She became a training carrier in December 1938 when Ark Royal joined the Home Fleet and continued on that duty until the start of the Second World War.

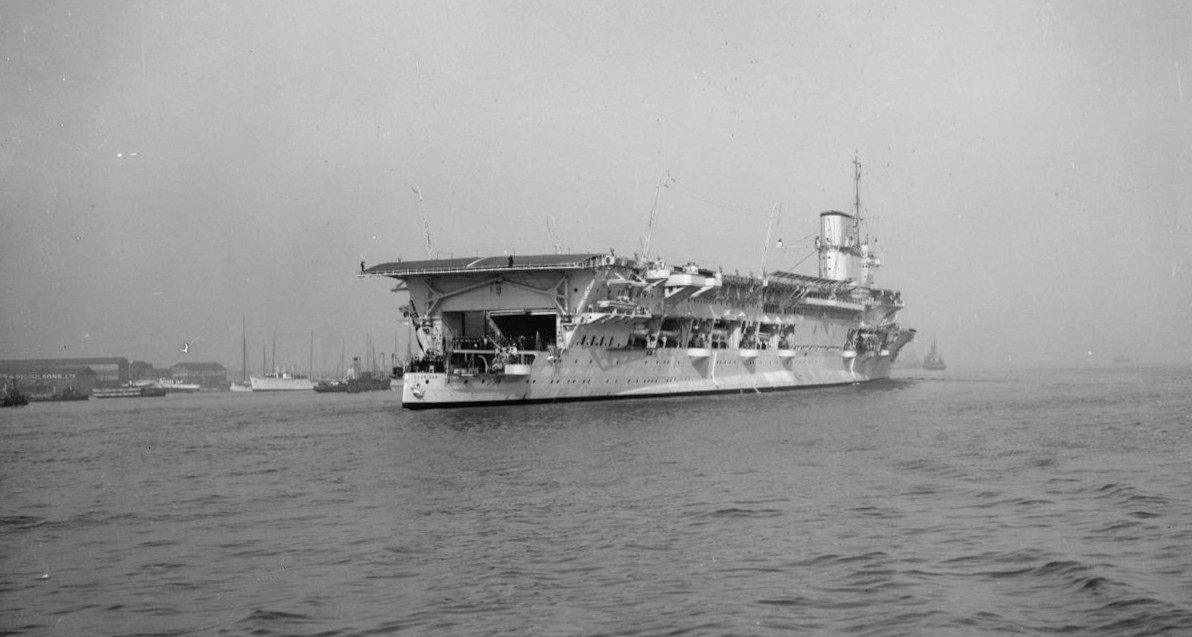
Glorious at anchor (c. 1934)

Glorious was recommissioned on 24 February 1930 for service with the Mediterranean Fleet, but was attached to the Home Fleet from March to June 1930. She relieved Courageous in the Mediterranean Fleet in June 1930 and remained there until October 1939. In a fog on 1 April 1931 Glorious rammed SS Florida amidships while steaming at 16 kn (30 km/h; 18 mph). The impact crumpled 60 ft (18.3 m) of the flying-off deck and forced Glorious to put into Gibraltar for temporary repairs. She had to sail to Malta for permanent repairs which lasted until September 1931. Sometime in the early 1930s, transverse arresting gear was installed. She was refitted at Devonport from July 1934 to July 1935 where she received two catapults, her flight deck was extended to the rear, her quarterdeck was raised one deck and she received her multiple pom-pom mounts. Glorious also participated in the 1937 Coronation Fleet Review before returning to the Mediterranean.

== Second World War ==
=== Courageous ===
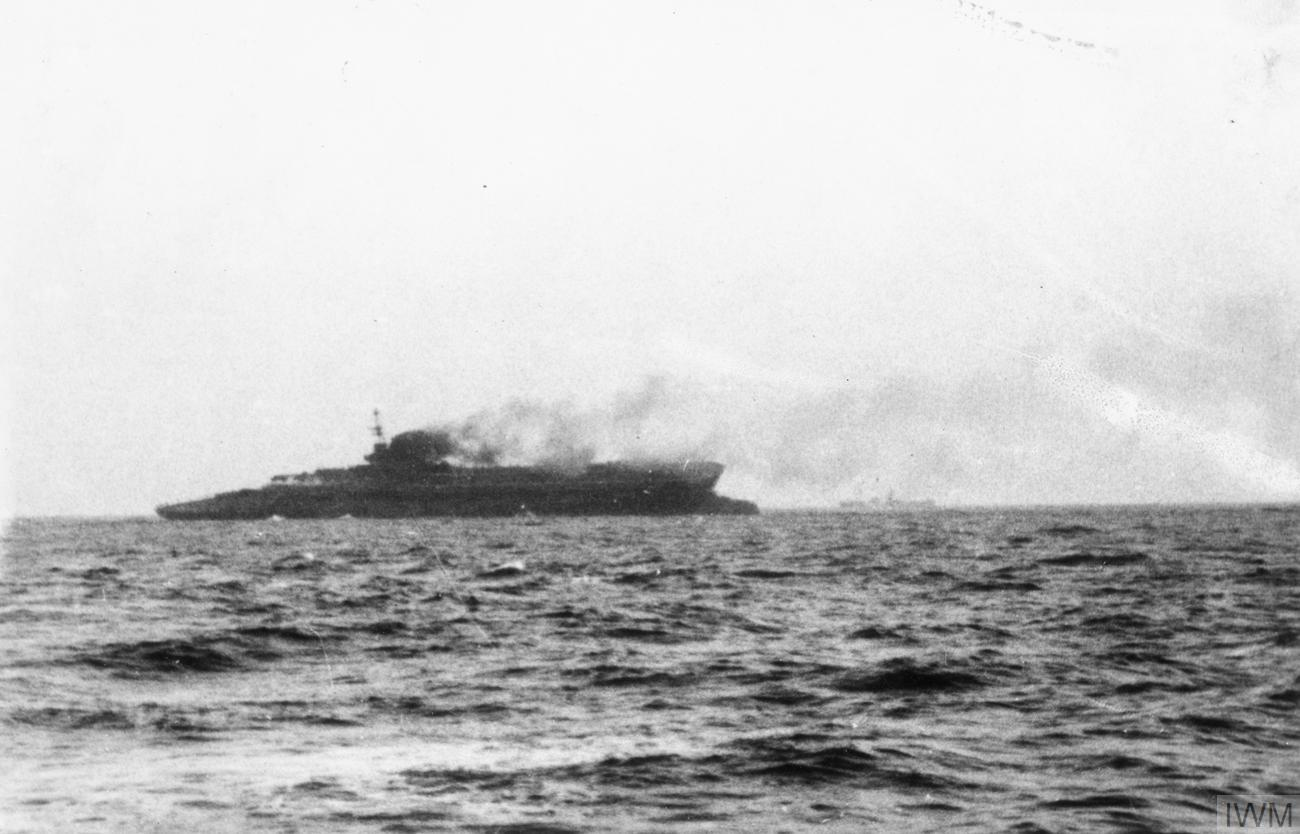
Courageous sinking

In the early days of the war, hunter-killer groups were formed around the fleet aircraft carriers to find and destroy U-boats. On 17 September 1939, U-boat U-29 struck the ship with two torpedoes, and Courageous became the first British warship sunk to enemy action in the Second World War. As Ark Royal had been surprised by a near-miss seven days earlier, the fleet carriers were withdrawn from this duty.

=== Glorious ===
Force J, including Glorious, was organised to hunt for the German pocket battleship Admiral Graf Spee in the Indian Ocean. They were not successful, and Glorious remained in the Indian Ocean until December when she was transferred to the Mediterranean.

Glorious was recalled to the Home Fleet in April 1940 to provide air cover for British forces landing in Norway. Gloster Gladiators of No. 263 Squadron RAF were flown aboard to be transferred to Norwegian airbases. Glorious and Ark Royal arrived off central Norway on 24 April where 263 Squadron was flown off and their organic aircraft attacked targets in the Trondheim area before Glorious had to return to Scapa Flow on 27 April to refuel and embark new aircraft. She returned on 1 May, after failing to load new aircraft because of poor weather. The task force was under heavy air attack by the Luftwaffe all day and was withdrawn that evening.

Glorious returned on 18 May with six Supermarine Walrus amphibious flying boats of 701 Squadron and 18 Hawker Hurricanes of No. 46 Squadron RAF. The Walruses were flown off to Harstad, but the airfield in Skånland Municipality was not yet ready for the Hurricanes and they were still aboard when Glorious returned to Scapa on 21 May. Glorious came back to the Narvik area on 26 May and the Hurricanes were flown off.

British forces were ordered withdrawn a few days later. The evacuation (Operation Alphabet) began in the north on the night of 3/4 June, and Glorious arrived off the coast on 2 June to provide support. She carried only nine Sea Gladiators of 802 Squadron and six Fairey Swordfish torpedo bombers of 823 Squadron for self-defence, as it was hoped to evacuate the RAF fighters if possible. Ten Gladiators of 263 Squadron were flown aboard during the afternoon of 7 June and the Hurricanes of 46 Squadron were also flown aboard without any significant problems in the early evening despite having a much higher landing speed than the biplanes. This was the first time that high performance monoplanes without tailhooks had been landed on an aircraft carrier.

Captain Guy D'Oyly-Hughes requested and was granted permission to proceed independently to Scapa Flow in the early hours of 8 June. On the way back across the North Sea, Glorious and her two escorting destroyers, Acasta and Ardent, were found by the two German battleships Scharnhorst and Gneisenau. No combat air patrol was being flown, no aircraft were spotted on the deck for quick take off and there was no lookout in the crow's nest. The German heavy ships sank all three British vessels with most of their crews, although Acasta managed to torpedo Scharnhorst before she was sunk. Only 43 men from Glorious survived.

=== Furious ===
Until 2 October 1939, Furious remained on training duties, combined with anti-submarine sweeps off the east coast of Scotland. She was then assigned to the Home Fleet to replace the sunken Courageous and sortied on 8 October with the fleet to hunt unsuccessfully for the Gneisenau and escorting ships which had been spotted off southern Norway. Furious departed her berth adjacent to the battleship Royal Oak in Scapa Flow for more futile searches for German ships on 13 October, the day before Royal Oak was sunk by U-47 in Scapa Flow. Furious served as the flagship for the convoy bringing most of the 1st Canadian Infantry Division to Britain in mid-December 1939.

Furious joined the Home Fleet off the coast of Norway on 10 April 1940 and her Swordfish made several attacks on German ships in Narvik on the following days. She refuelled at Tromsø on the 14th and remained behind after the bulk of the Home Fleet departed on 15 April, her aircraft flying reconnaissance missions until ordered home on 25 April. Her port inner turbine had been damaged by the shock wave from a near miss on 18 April, and the damage was more serious than initially thought. After quick repairs, Furious returned on 18 May carrying the Gladiators of a reformed 263 Squadron; they were flown off on 21 May once their base at Bardufoss was ready. She sailed to Scapa Flow once all the Gladiators had been flown off.

On 14 June, carrying only half of 816 Squadron for her own protection, Furious sailed unescorted for Halifax, Nova Scotia carrying £18,000,000 in gold bullion. On 1 July she escorted a convoy of Canadian troops bound for Iceland from Halifax and ferried over almost 50 aircraft, spare parts and munitions. On his own initiative, Captain Troubridge ordered all available space should be used for sugar bound for Britain. She reembarked her aircraft upon her arrival and made a number of air strikes on shipping in Norwegian waters and on the seaplane base at Tromsø through October 1940. Furious loaded 55 aircraft in Liverpool on 7 November and sailed for Takoradi, Gold Coast, on 15 November where the aircraft were flown off on 27 November to reinforce fighter units defending Egypt. By 15 December, Furious was back in Liverpool, where she embarked 40 Hurricanes for Takoradi. She sailed on 21 December and joined up with Convoy WS 5A which encountered the Admiral Hipper on 25 December. The German ship was driven off by the escorts, and Furious reached Takoradi on 10 January 1941. She arrived in Britain on 5 February where she was given a brief refit. She made another ferry trip to Takoradi between 4 and 22 March.

Now with a new destination for her ferry trips, Furious transported two dozen Hurricanes to Gibraltar on 25 April where they were transferred to Ark Royal to be flown off for Malta. She returned for another load of Hurricanes and arrived back in Gibraltar on 18 May. Some of these fighters were moved to Ark Royal via planks between the flight decks of the carriers berthed stern to stern. This time she accompanied Ark Royal and the two carriers flew off their fighters from a position south of Sardinia. She would repeat this ferry mission three more times from June to September 1941. In July and August, Furious and Victorious attacked German installations in the Arctic areas of Norway and Finland with limited success and heavy losses. Following her last ferry mission she was sent to Philadelphia, Pennsylvania, to refit.

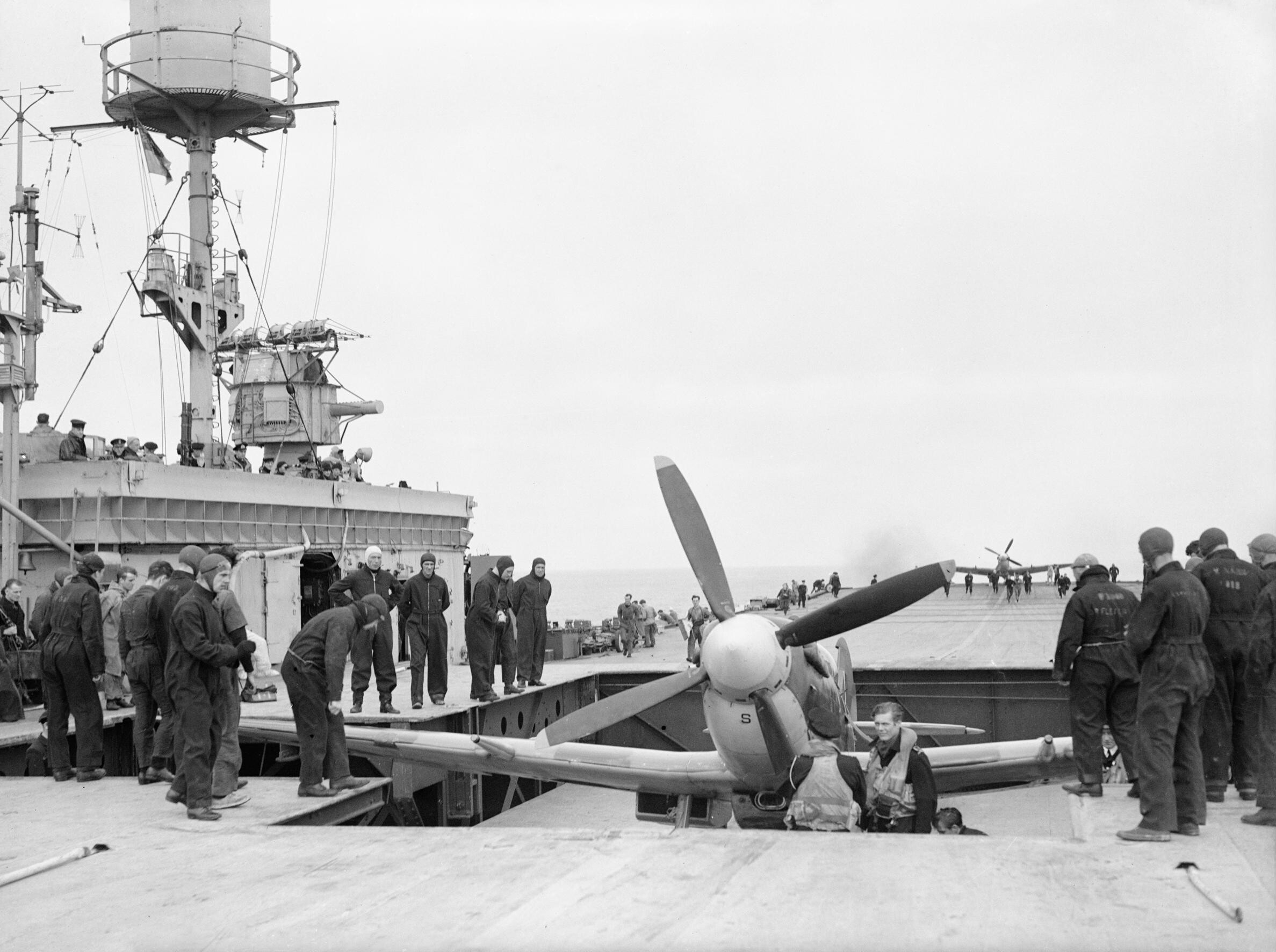
A Supermarine Seafire being brought up onto the flight deck of Furious, August 1944

Furious arrived back in the UK in April 1942 and spent the next three months working up. In August she was detailed to accompany the convoy bound for Malta in Operation Pedestal, but she was to sail with them only far enough to allow her 38 Supermarine Spitfires to reach Malta. This she did, just as Eagle was torpedoed, but Furious turned around after flying off her fighters and reached Gibraltar successfully. She loaded another batch of 32 Spitfires on 16 August and they were flown off the following day south-east of the Balearic Islands. After this mission Furious was sent back to Home Fleet for training. One last mission was necessary to reinforce the defences of Malta before Operation Torch, and she arrived on 27 October. She loaded 32 Spitfires and launched them on the 29th before returning to Gibraltar to participate in Torch.

Providing cover for the Central Task Force, Furious's aircraft neutralised the airfields at La Senia and Tafraoui, both near Oran, Algeria. She remained with Force H until February 1943 before transferring to Home Fleet where she remained for the rest of the war. In July the Home Fleet demonstrated off the coast of Norway in strength to distract attention from the Allied invasion of Sicily; Furious's role was to allow a German reconnaissance aircraft to spot the British ships and make a report then shoot it down. She was refitted in August and spent the rest of the year training.

On 3 April 1944, Fairey Barracudas from Furious and Victorious attacked the German battleship Tirpitz in Altafjord, Norway, as part of Operation Tungsten. Tirpitz was hit 14 times and needed three months to complete her repairs, although four aircraft were lost in the attack. The Home Fleet tried another attack on Tirpitz later in the month, but bad weather prevented any attack from being made. Instead the aircraft attempted to attack installations at Bodø, but found a German convoy instead and sank three ships. Three operations against targets in northern Norway, including two against Tirpitz, had to be abandoned or diverted to other targets in May, but three German ships were sunk and two more were set afire. Furious and other carriers made another attempt to sink the Tirpitz on 17 July, but were unsuccessful against the fully alerted German defences. Four more attacks on Tirpitz were made in August, but only the attack on the 24th was even partially successful as two minor hits were made.

As the war progressed, the ship's age and limitations became increasingly apparent, and Furious was placed in reserve on 15 September 1944. She was paid off in April 1945 and used to evaluate the effects of aircraft explosives on the ship's structure. She was sold in 1948 for scrap, which was completed in 1954 at Troon.
