= Guy D'Oyly-Hughes =

Royal Navy officer

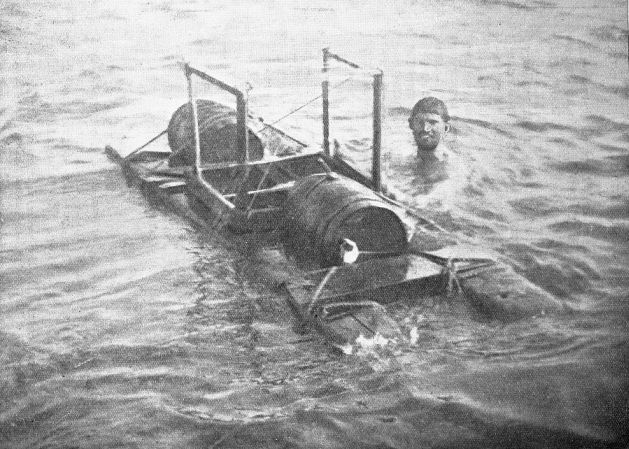
- Lieutenant Guy D'Oyly Hughes starting off with his raft on 21 August 1915
- Born: 8 August 1891; Salt Lake City, Utah, US
- Died: 8 June 1940 (aged 48); HMS Glorious, Norwegian Sea
- Spouse(s): Anne Margaret Gladys D'Oyly-Hughes, of New York City, U.S.A.
- Military career
- Allegiance: United Kingdom
- Branch: Royal Navy
- Service years: 1904–1940
- Rank: Captain
- Commands: HMS Glorious (1939–1940); 1st Submarine Flotilla (1934–36); HMS Cyclops (1935–1936); HMS Douglas (1934–1935); HMS Oberon (1925–1928); HMS K12 (1924–1925)
- Conflicts: First World War: Gallipoli campaign; Second World War: Norwegian campaign †
- Awards: Distinguished Service Order & Bar; Distinguished Service Cross; Mentioned in Despatches

Captain Guy D'Oyly-Hughes, DSO & Bar, DSC (8 August 1891 – 8 June 1940) was an officer in the Royal Navy.

== Early life ==
Guy D'Oyly-Hughes was born on 8 August 1891 in Salt Lake City, Utah, United States, the son of Samuel Hughes, a British physician, and Kezia D'Oyly Hughes. At the age of nine, he was sent to Britain to complete his education, followed by his parents in 1901. They eventually settled in Southampton. D'Oyly-Hughes married Anne Margaret Gladys Crawford, with whom he had two daughters.

== Naval career ==
=== First World War ===
During the First World War, Lieutenant D'Oyly-Hughes was a submariner and second in command of HMS E11, which was highly successful in the Dardanelles Campaign. He was awarded the Distinguished Service Cross (DSC) in June 1915 after a patrol in which his captain, Lieutenant Commander Martin Nasmith, was awarded the Victoria Cross. D'Oyly-Hughes was awarded the DSC after swimming ashore from E11 with explosives and blowing up part of the Constantinople-Baghdad Railway on 21 August 1915.

=== Second World War and death ===
In June 1939, as a captain, D'Oyly-Hughes was given command of the aircraft carrier HMS Glorious. He had learned to fly and continually rejected the advice of the ship's professional aviators, according to Winton. Returning to Britain from the Norwegian campaign on 8 June 1940, Glorious and her destroyer escort of HMS Acasta and HMS Ardent were surprised and caught by Scharnhorst and Gneisenau in the Norwegian Sea. All three British ships were sunk with the loss of at least 1,533 lives. D'Oyly-Hughes went down with his ship.

Glorious had been sighted in conditions of maximum visibility, a condition in which an aircraft carrier would normally have one or more aircraft out on a Combat Air Patrol. Glorious had no such patrol, and was unable to reach maximum speed before coming in range of the enemy's 28 cm (11 in) guns. Winton describes D'Oyly-Hughes' lack of belief in the effectiveness of air patrols and the questions raised by numerous commentators, including eyewitnesses from Glorious and Scharnhorst, about the captain's judgement in this and other matters.

== See also ==
Hansard report on the debate "HMS Glorious" in the House of Commons on 28 January 1999.
