= FuMO 24 radar =

FuMO 24/25
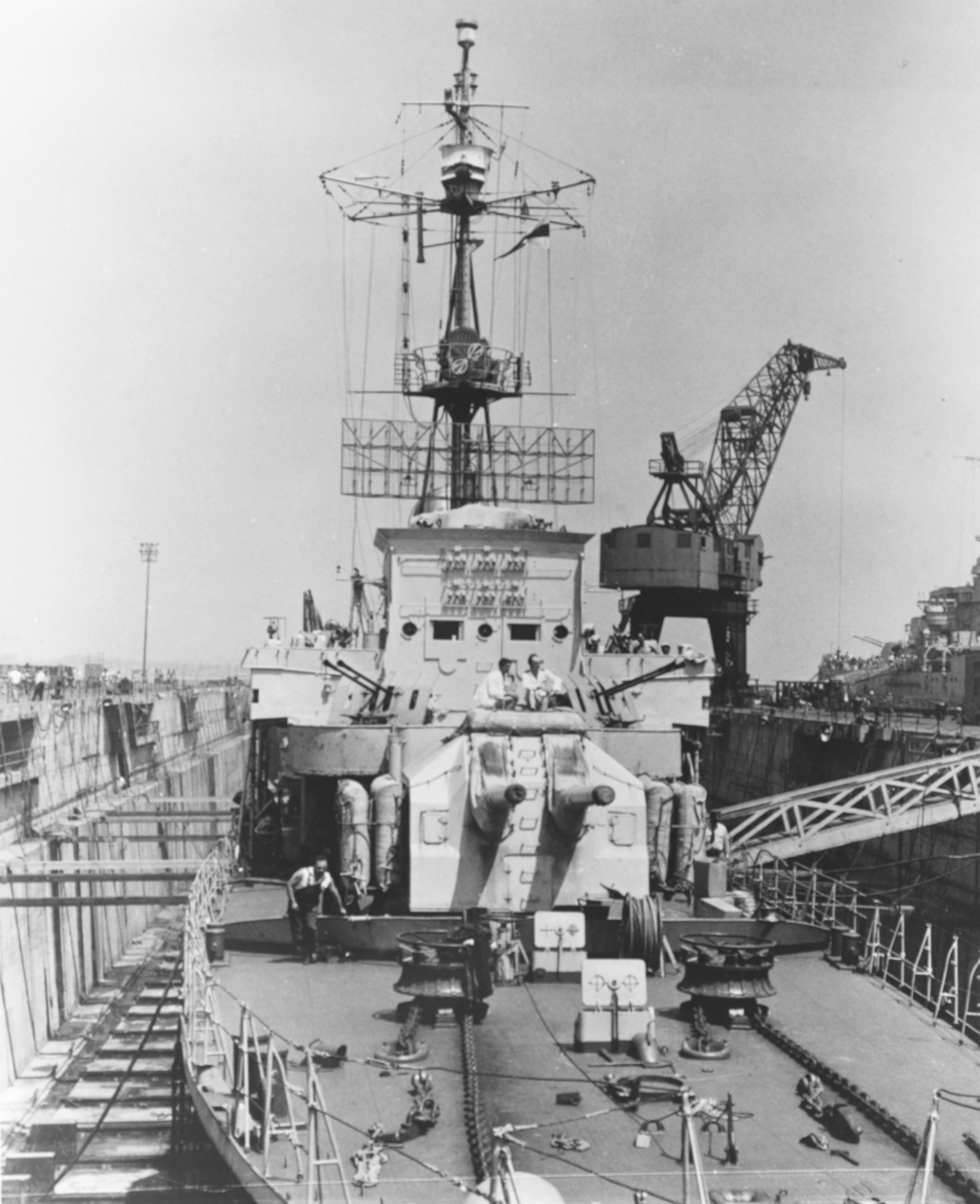
- The rectangular antenna of the FuMO 24/25 of the ex-German destroyer Z39
- Country of origin: Nazi Germany
- Introduced: 1943
- Type: Search radar
- Frequency: 368 MHz/81.5 cm
- PRF: 500 per second
- Pulsewidth: 5 μs
- Range: about 12 nmi (22 km; 14 mi)
- Precision: ±70 m (230 ft)
- Power: 8 kW

The FuMO 24 and 25 (Funkmess-Ortung (Radio-direction finder, active ranging)) were designed as a replacement for the earlier FuMO search radar for Nazi Germany's Kriegsmarine in 1943. The differences between the two models are not clear and it usually used a larger 2-by-6-meter (6 ft 7 in × 19 ft 8 in) antenna than the older system.

== Bibliography ==
- Friedman, Norman (1981). Naval Radar. London: Conway Maritime Press. ISBN 0-85177-238-2.
- Sieche, Erwin (1982). "German Naval Radar". In Roberts, John (ed.). Warship VI. London: Conway Maritime Press. pp. 2–10, 146–153. ISBN 0-87021-981-2.
