= HMT Juniper =

British minesweeping trawler (1939–1940)

History

United Kingdom
- Name: HMT Juniper (T123)
- Namesake: Juniper
- Builder: Ferguson Brothers (Port Glasgow) Ltd., Port Glasgow
- Launched: 15 December 1939
- Commissioned: 9 March 1940
- Fate: Sunk, 8 June 1940

General characteristics
- Class & type: Tree-class trawler
- Displacement: 545 long tons (554 t)
- Length: 164 ft (50 m)
- Beam: 27 ft 8 in (8.43 m)
- Draught: 11 ft 1 in (3.38 m) (mean)
- Propulsion: 1 × Triple expansion reciprocating engine, 850 ihp (634 kW), 1 shaft
- Speed: 12 knots (22 km/h; 14 mph)
- Complement: 40
- Armament: 1 × QF 12-pounder (76-mm) anti-aircraft gun; 3 × 20mm Oerlikon AA guns; 30 × depth charges

HMT Juniper (T123) was a Tree-class minesweeping trawler of the Royal Navy. She was built by Ferguson Brothers (Port Glasgow) Ltd. at Port Glasgow, launched on 15 December 1939, and commissioned on 9 March 1940.

A steel vessel of 545 tons, Juniper measured 164 feet (50 m) in length with a beam of 27 feet 8 inches (8.43 m) and a mean draft of 11 feet 1 inch (3.38 m) A single triple-expansion reciprocating engine of 850 indicated horsepower (630 kW) gave her a speed of 12 knots (22 km/h; 14 mph). The crew numbered 4 officers and 36 men. Armament comprised a 12-pdr AA gun, three 20 mm Oerlikon AA guns, and 30 depth charges.

Operation Alphabet

Following the Allied decision to withdraw from northern Norway, Juniper took part in Operation Alphabet, the evacuation of British, French and Polish forces from the Narvik campaign in June 1940. After completing evacuation duties, she joined a westbound convoy of troopships and support vessels sailing through the Norwegian Sea to return to Scapa Flow.

On the morning of 8 June, a German task force, consisting of the battleships Scharnhorst and Gneisenau, the heavy cruiser Admiral Hipper and four destroyers, intercepted the British vessels north-east of Jan Mayen. During the action, Juniper, the tanker Oil Pioneer and the troopship Orama were sunk, while the hospital ship Atlantis was allowed to proceed unharmed in accordance with international convention. Juniper was sunk by gunfire from Admiral Hipper at position 67°20′N 4°10′E Of her crew of forty officers and men, twenty-three were killed in the sinking.

Marschall then sent Admiral Hipper and the destroyers to Trondheim to refuel. Later that same day, Scharnhorst and Gneisenau encountered and sank the aircraft carrier Glorious and the destroyers Acasta and Ardent.
