= 1610 in Norway =

- Centuries: 15th; 16th; 17th; 18th; 19th
- Decades: 1590s; 1600s; 1610s; 1620s; 1630s
- See also: 1610 in Denmark; List of years in Norway

Events in the year 1610 in Norway.

== Incumbents ==
- Monarch: Christian IV

== Events ==
- 17 June – Prince Christian was proclaimed as heir apparent to Christian IV of Norway, in Oslo.
- 17 August – Christian IV of Denmark-Norway ordered the construction of Altenhus Fortress on the island of Aarøen near Alten in Finnmark county.
- The town of Arendal is founded.

== Births ==
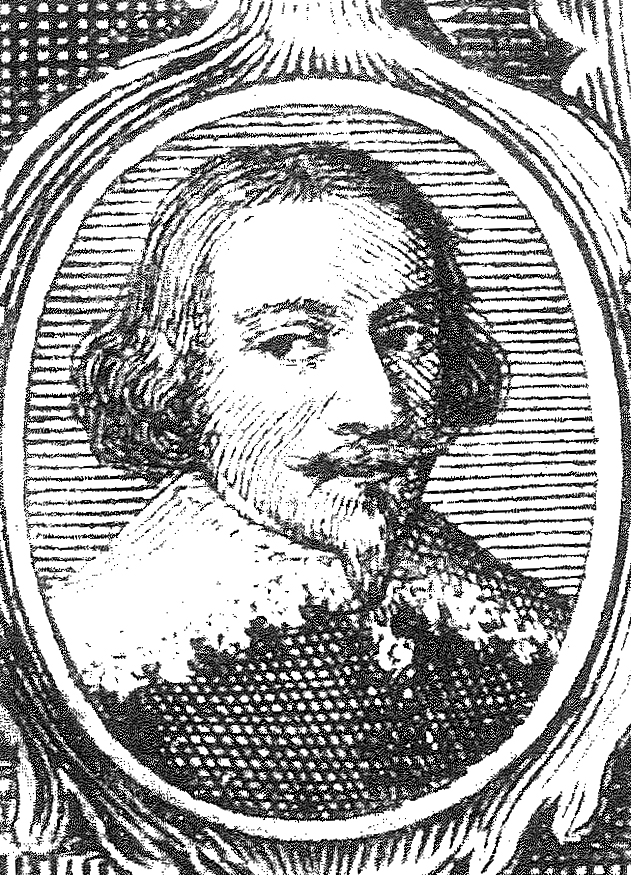
Arent Berntsen

- 12 May - Arent Berntsen, topographical-statistical author, businessman, banker, estate owner and councillor (died 1680).

=== Around 1610 ===
- Lisbet Nypan, alleged witch (d. 1670).
- Hans Hansen Bergen, emigrant from Norway and early/pioneer settler in New Amsterdam (died 1654).

== Deaths ==
- 5 February – Strange Jørgenssøn, bailiff and businessman (born 1539).
