= Skorpa prisoner of war camp =

World War II POW camp in Norway

- Skorpa fangeleir
- Skorpa in Kvænangen, Troms

Site information
- Type: Prisoner-of-war camp
- Controlled by: Norway

Location
- Coordinates: 69°55′55″N 21°41′33″E

Site history
- Built: April–June 1940
- Built by: Norwegian 6th Division
- In use: May–19 June 1940
- Materials: Tents, wooden barracks
- Demolished: June 1940
- Events: Norwegian Campaign

Garrison information
- Past commanders: Captain Rei Sandberg
- Garrison: 80 soldiers

Skorpa prisoner of war camp (Norwegian: Skorpa fangeleir) was a facility built by the Norwegian 6th Division to hold German prisoners of war during the 1940 Norwegian Campaign of the Second World War. It was located on the island of Skorpa in Kvænangen Municipality in Troms county, Norway. Skorpa was the main PoW camp in Northern Norway and held around 500 civilian and military prisoners when it was shut down at the end of the Norwegian Campaign.

== Background ==
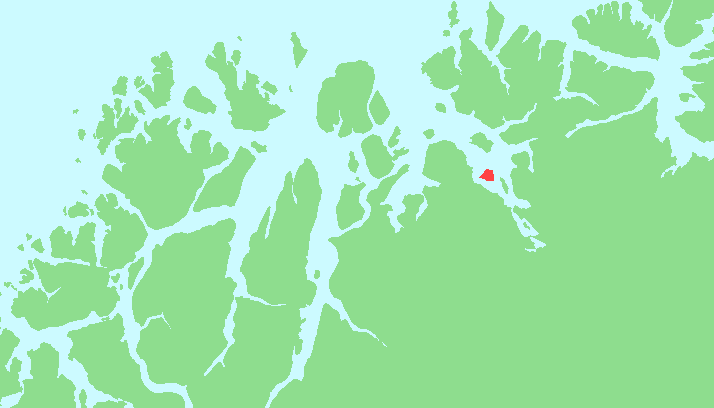
The island of Skorpa in Troms

With the outbreak of war between Norway and Nazi Germany following the German invasion of Norway increasing numbers of German prisoners fell into Norwegian hands in the fighting that followed. While many of these were soon liberated by the advancing German forces, the situation for those captured in Northern Norway was different. The Germans fighting at Narvik were on the defensive against superior Norwegian and Allied forces. Prisoners taken during the fighting were sent behind Allied lines, outside the reach of the Wehrmacht. After having first interned the German prisoners at various locations around the region the decision was made by the Norwegian 6th Division command to establish a central prisoner of war camp at the small and isolated island of Skorpa in Kvænangen Municipality in Troms county. Access to the island was by boat. The nearest Norwegian armed forces other than the guard force were 10 to 12 hours away from the camp.

== Construction ==
When the first prisoners were sent to the camp they had to live in tents designed for 16 occupants each. By May the construction of wooden barracks had begun, with the prisoners providing the labour force under the guidance of civilian Norwegian craftsmen. Around 100 prisoners were at any time taking part in construction work, much of this outside the barbed wire. The construction was overseen by a second lieutenant of the Norwegian Army engineers. The barracks were meant to provide proper accommodation for the prisoners in the next winter.

== Camp population ==
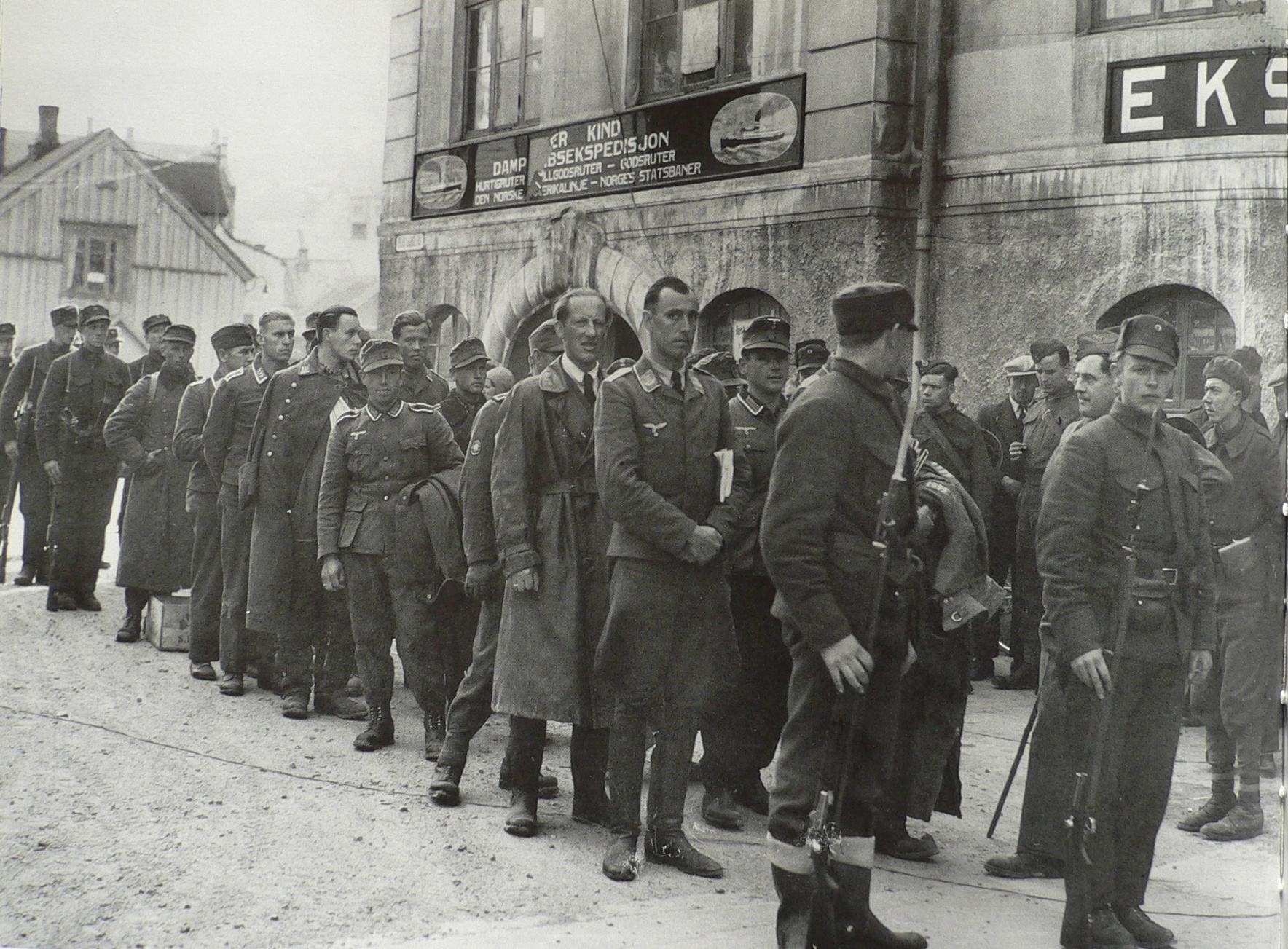
German prisoners of war under guard in Harstad, Northern Norway, in May 1940

All Germans captured in Northern Norway were supposed to be gathered at Skorpa, the main Norwegian PoW camp in the region. Amongst the inmates at the camp were military personnel belonging to all three services of the German Wehrmacht; the Heer, the Kriegsmarine and the Luftwaffe. In addition to the military prisoners there were also civilians from trawlers and merchant vessels sunk or captured off the Northern Norwegian coast. In all some 500 Germans were imprisoned at Skorpa. Because of the lack of an internment camp for civilian Germans the sailors were placed as an interim measure in the same camp as the military captives.

The senior German prisoner held at the camp was Fregattenkapitän Alfred Schulze-Hinrichs, who had been captured after his destroyer, the Erich Koellner, was sunk on 13 April during the naval battles off Narvik. Along with 154 other prisoners he had first been sent to an internment camp at Vardøhus Fortress in Finnmark on the 1,382 ton Norwegian steamship Nova. After having been held at Vardøhus from 24 April to 13 May, the 155 Germans were shipped to Skorpa, again on the Nova. On the way to Skorpa another 25 prisoners were picked up at the western Finnmark port of Hammerfest. The prisoner transport from Finnmark to Skorpa was escorted by the patrol boat Ingrid – a captured German trawler operated by the Royal Norwegian Navy. Prisoners kept arriving at the camp until early June 1940; Germans that had been captured at the front-line near Narvik, shot-down pilots, and prisoners taken by the remaining pockets of Norwegian resistance on the coast of southern Helgeland and smuggled past German lines to Skorpa. Eight of the German airmen at the camp had been captured when two German Heinkel He 115s ran out of fuel on the return from an aborted mission to Narvik on 13 April 1940, landing at Ørnes and Brønnøysund respectively. The crews, led by Leutnant zur See Joachim Vogler and Oberleutnant zur See Bärner, were captured by local Norwegian militia forces and the aircraft transferred intact to the Royal Norwegian Navy Air Service.

The prisoners were guarded by 80 Norwegian soldiers, 45 of whom belonged to the Varanger Battalion from eastern Finnmark while the remaining 35 were troops that had escaped the collapse of the fighting in the southern parts of Norway and made their way to Northern Norway by way of neutral Sweden. Command of the camp had been transferred to Captain Rei Sandberg by the commander of the Norwegian armed forces in Finnmark, Edvard Os, after disturbances had broken out in the inmate population. During the camp's existence two prisoners died. One merchant navy sailor was killed by a stray warning shot during a disturbance in the camp, and Oberleutnant Hans Hattenbach (the pilot of Oberleutnant zur See Bärner's He 115) was shot on 6 June by a Finnish volunteer soldier when he approached the camp fence and failed to heed orders from a guard to stop. Hattenbach was buried with full military honours in the presence of 30 prisoners and a 14-strong Norwegian military honour guard.

== Dissolution ==
On 5 June 1940, Captain Rei Sandberg, the commander of Skorpa prisoner of war camp from early May 1940, received a call from the district military command asking how many airmen were held at the camp. At that time the number was 40, however later that day another 51 prisoners arrived at the camp, 19 of whom were airmen. Thus, when the order came in the late evening to transfer the 40 airmen to Harstad for interrogation at the British headquarters in Norway there were 59 Luftwaffe personnel at Skorpa. District Command concluded that it was best to send the requested 40 prisoners, rather than to send all 59. The 40 sent from Skorpa were the highest ranking of the 59, including all the pilots. None of these prisoners ever reached Harstad, instead being embarked on Allied ships and taken to the United Kingdom as the Allies evacuated Northern Norway only days later. Shortly after the departure of the Luftwaffe prisoners orders came through for the southern Norwegian soldiers guarding the camp to be transferred for front service against the Germans. Before any of the soldiers could leave Skorpa, however, word reached the camp at 0130hrs on 8 June of the forthcoming capitulation of the Norwegian mainland.

Many of the Norwegian guards left Skorpa prisoner of war camp on 10 June 1940, being sent to Altagård army camp in Alta Municipality on two fishing boats. The German prisoners were told of the capitulation, released and transported from the camp under the leadership of Schulze-Hinrichs in the late evening of 12 June, on the Norwegian steamships Barøy and Tanahorn. The released prisoners were first sent to the port city of Tromsø for bathing and delousing. Tromsø was not occupied by German forces until two days later, on 14 June. The last guards, belonging to the Varanger Battalion, left the camp on 15 June, with the commander and administrative officers departing on 19 June.

== Aftermath ==
Following the release of the German prisoners from the camp many of the Norwegian guards made their way over the mountains to Sweden to escape the German occupation of Norway. Captain Sandberg was arrested by the Gestapo in Trondheim on 28 June 1940, accused of mistreating the prisoners while in charge of Skorpa, but was released on 5 August 1940.

== Bibliography ==
- Dahm, Volker (2008). Stein Ugelvik Larsen (ed.). Meldungen aus Norwegen 1940–1945: die geheimen Lageberichte des Befehlshabers der Sicherheitspolizei und des SD in Norwegen, Part 1 (in German). Oldenbourg Wissenschaftsverlag. ISBN 978-3-486-55891-3.
- Fjørtoft, Kjell (1991). På feil side – Den andre krigen (in Norwegian). Oslo: Gyldendal Norsk Forlag. ISBN 82-05-20231-1.
- Fjørtoft, Kjell (1990). Ulvetiden (in Norwegian). Oslo: Gyldendal Norsk Forlag. ISBN 82-05-18437-2.
- Friberg, Leif A. (1991). De grå skipene og de gule bussene (in Norwegian). Finnmark Fylkesrederi og Ruteselskap. ISBN 82-992395-0-8.
- Hafsten, Bjørn; Ulf Larsstuvold; Bjørn Olsen; Sten Stenersen (1991). Flyalarm – luftkrigen over Norge 1939–1945 (in Norwegian) (1st ed.). Oslo: Sem og Stenersen AS. ISBN 82-7046-058-3.
- Lindmann, Knut; Ree-Pedersen, Erling (1999). Motstandskamp og dagligliv i Mossedistriktet 1940–1945 (in Norwegian). Moss: Hjemmefrontens venner. ISBN 82-995112-0-8.
- Sandberg, Rei (1945). Vi ville slåss (in Norwegian). Oslo: Gyldendal Norsk Forlag.
- Skogheim, Dag (1990). Fiender og mennesker: krig over Sør-Helgeland (in Norwegian). Brønnøyund: Brønnøysund bokhandel. ISBN 82-90963-00-9.
- Steen, E. A. (1958). Norges sjøkrig 1940–45: Sjøforsvarets kamper og virke i Nord-Norge i 1940 (in Norwegian). Vol. 4. Gyldendal Norsk Forlag.
- Steen, Sverre, ed. (1947). Norges krig (in Norwegian). Vol. 1. Oslo: Gyldendal Norsk Forlag. ISBN 82-90963-00-9.
