= 1624 in Norway =

- Centuries: 16th; 17th; 18th; 19th
- Decades: 1600s; 1610s; 1620s; 1630s; 1640s
- See also: 1624 in Denmark; List of years in Norway

Events in the year 1624 in Norway:

== Incumbents ==
- Monarch: Christian IV

== Events ==
- 28 February – A decree made it explicitly illegal for Jesuits and monks to appear in the country, with death penalty as a consequence for offenders.
- 17-20 August – The great city fire of Oslo.
- 25 October – Det Norske Jernkompani is granted a royal privilege, granting the company a near monopoly on iron production on an industrial scale within Norway.
- Fall – Three women were executed by decapitation at the Akershus witch trials.
- The mining town of Kongsberg is founded.
- Christian IV renames and moves Oslo after the great fire. He renames the city Christiania.
- Eidsvoll Verk is established.

== Deaths ==
- 7 February – Cort Aslakssøn, astronomer, theologist and philosopher (born 1564).
