= German destroyer Z5 Paul Jacobi =

Type 1934A-class destroyer

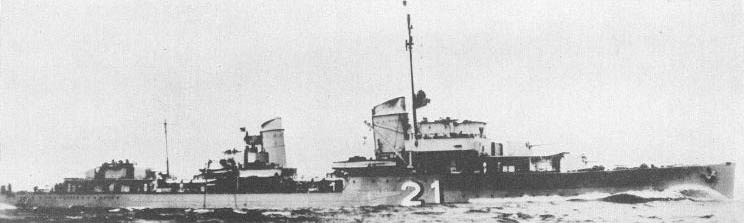
- Z5 Paul Jacobi, c. 1938

History

Nazi Germany
- Name: Z5 Paul Jacobi
- Namesake: Paul Jacobi
- Ordered: 9 January 1935
- Builder: DeSchiMAG, Bremen
- Yard number: W899
- Laid down: 15 July 1935
- Launched: 24 March 1936
- Completed: 29 June 1937
- Decommissioned: 7 May 1945
- Captured: 7 May 1945

France
- Name: Desaix, 4 February 1946
- Namesake: Louis Desaix
- Acquired: 4 February 1946
- In service: September 1946
- Out of service: January 1949
- Renamed: Q02, 17 February 1954
- Stricken: 17 February 1954
- Fate: Sold for scrap, June 1954

General characteristics (as built)
- Class & type: Type 1934A destroyer
- Displacement: 2,171 long tons (2,206 t) (standard); 3,110 long tons (3,160 t) (deep load)
- Length: 119 m (390 ft 5 in) o/a; 114 m (374 ft 0 in) w/l
- Beam: 11.30 m (37 ft 1 in)
- Draft: 4.23 m (13 ft 11 in)
- Installed power: 70,000 PS (51,000 kW; 69,000 shp); 6 × water-tube boilers
- Propulsion: 2 shafts, 2 × geared steam turbines
- Speed: 36 knots (67 km/h; 41 mph)
- Range: 1,530 nmi (2,830 km; 1,760 mi) at 19 knots (35 km/h; 22 mph)
- Complement: 325
- Armament: 5 × single 12.7 cm (5 in) guns; 2 × twin 3.7 cm (1.5 in) AA guns; 6 × single 2 cm (0.8 in) AA guns; 2 × quadruple 53.3 cm (21 in) torpedo tubes; 60 mines; 32–64 depth charges, 4 throwers and 6 individual racks

Z5 Paul Jacobi was a Type 1934A destroyer built for the Kriegsmarine in the mid-1930s. The ship was being refitted when World War II began on 1 September 1939 and was tasked to inspect neutral shipping for contraband goods in the Kattegat until early 1940. She participated in the early stages of the Norwegian Campaign by transporting troops to the Trondheim area in early April 1940 and was transferred to France later that year where she made several attacks on British shipping. Paul Jacobi spent most of 1941 under repair and returned to France in early 1942 to successfully escort two German battleships and a heavy cruiser home through the English Channel (the Channel Dash). The following month, the ship helped to escort another German battleship to northern Norway and returned in May to begin another lengthy refit.

Paul Jacobi spent most of 1943 inactive in the Arctic before returning to Germany in September for another refit. She was badly damaged by Allied air attacks on Kiel and was not operational again until late 1944. She spent most of the rest of the war escorting ships as the Germans evacuated East Prussia and bombarding Soviet forces. The ship was captured by the Allies in May 1945 and spent the rest of the year under British control as the Allies decided how to dispose of the captured German ships.

Paul Jacobi was ultimately allotted to France in early 1946 and renamed Desaix. She became operational later that year, but her service with the French Navy was fairly brief, with only cruises to French colonies in Africa during 1947 of note before she was paid off in late 1948 and placed in reserve in early 1949. The ship was used as a source of spare parts of the other ex-German ships in French service until she was condemned and sold for scrap in 1954.

== Design and description ==
Z5 Paul Jacobi had an overall length of 119 meters (390 ft 5 in) and was 114 meters (374 ft 0 in) long at the waterline. At some point before September 1939, her stem was lengthened, which increased her overall length to 120 meters (393 ft 8 in). The ship had a beam of 11.30 meters (37 ft 1 in), and a maximum draft of 4.23 meters (13 ft 11 in). She displaced 2,171 long tons (2,206 t) at standard load and 3,110 long tons (3,160 t) at deep load. The two Wagner geared steam turbine sets, each driving one propeller shaft, were designed to produce 70,000 metric horsepower (51,000 kW; 69,000 shp) using steam provided by six high-pressure Wagner boilers. The ship had a designed speed of 36 knots (67 km/h; 41 mph), but her maximum speed was 38.7 knots (71.7 km/h; 44.5 mph). Paul Jacobi carried a maximum of 752 metric tons (740 long tons) of fuel oil which was intended to give a range of 4,400 nautical miles (8,100 km; 5,100 mi) at a speed of 19 knots (35 km/h; 22 mph), but the ship proved top-heavy in service and 30% of the fuel had to be retained as ballast low in the ship. The effective range proved to be only 1,530 nmi (2,830 km; 1,760 mi) at 19 knots. The crew numbered 10 officers and 315 enlisted men, plus an additional four officers and 19 enlisted men if serving as a flotilla flagship.

The ship carried five 12.7-centimeter (5 in) SK C/34 guns in single mounts with gun shields, two each superimposed, fore and aft. The fifth gun was carried on top of the aft superstructure. Her anti-aircraft armament consisted of four 3.7-centimeter (1.5 in) SK C/30 guns in two twin mounts abreast the rear funnel and six 2-centimeter (0.8 in) C/30 guns in single mounts. Paul Jacobi carried eight above-water 53.3-centimeter (21 in) torpedo tubes in two power-operated mounts. A pair of reload torpedoes were provided for each mount. Four depth charge throwers were mounted on the sides of the rear deckhouse and they were supplemented by six racks for individual depth charges on the sides of the stern. Enough depth charges were carried for either two or four patterns of 16 charges each. Mine rails could be fitted on the rear deck that had a maximum capacity of 60 mines. A system of passive hydrophones designated as 'GHG' (Gruppenhorchgerät) was fitted to detect submarines.

An active sonar system was probably installed by the end of 1940, but it is uncertain when it was actually done. During the war, the ship's light anti-aircraft armament was augmented several times. Improved 2 cm C/38 guns replaced the original C/30 guns and three additional guns were added sometime in 1941. The two guns on the aft shelter deck were replaced by a single 2 cm quadruple Flakvierling mount, probably during her mid-1942 refit. During 1944–45, Paul Jacobi was one of the few destroyers to receive the full "Barbara" anti-aircraft refit in which all of her existing 3.7 cm and most of her 2 cm guns were replaced with improved models in greater numbers. The fifth 12.7 cm gun was removed to compensate for the weight of the additional weapons. She retained her Flakvierling mount and, by the end of the war, the rest of her anti-aircraft armament consisted of four twin and two single 3.7 cm SK M/42 mounts, four twin and one single 2 cm mounts on the forecastle and sides of the bridge.

== Construction and career ==
Z5 Paul Jacobi, named after Paul Jacobi, was ordered on 9 January 1935 and laid down at DeSchiMAG, Bremen on 15 July 1935 as yard number W899. She was launched on 24 March 1936 and completed on 29 June 1937. The ship participated in the late 1937 naval maneuvers as part of the Second Destroyer Division (2. Zerstörerdivision). Z5 Paul Jacobi and her sister ship Z8 Bruno Heinemann sailed to Norway in April 1938 to test the new 15-centimeter (5.9 in) TbtsK C/36 gun planned for later classes of destroyers. Z8 Bruno Heinemann had been fitted with four of the new weapons and they were removed after gunnery trials off Ålesund were completed. Z5 Paul Jacobi participated in the August 1938 Fleet Review as part of the 2nd Destroyer Division and the following fleet exercise. The division accompanied the heavy cruiser Admiral Graf Spee on her voyage to the Mediterranean in October where they visited Vigo, Tangiers, and Ceuta before returning home. The destroyer had a lengthy refit at Wilhelmshaven from February 1939 to 29 September.

After she finished working up on 11 October, Paul Jacobi was tasked to inspect neutral shipping for contraband goods in the Skaggerak until February 1940 between visits to the shipyard. The ship was allocated to Group 2 for the Norwegian portion of Operation Weserübung. The group's task was to transport the 138th Mountain Infantry Regiment (Gebirgsjäger-Regiment 138) of the 3rd Mountain Division to seize Trondheim together with the heavy cruiser Admiral Hipper. The ships began loading troops on 6 April and set sail the next day. Paul Jacobi and her sisters Bruno Heinemann and Theodor Riedel each carried a company of mountain troops tasked to seize the forts defending the entrance to the Trondheimsfjord. En route the weather was so bad that Paul Jacobi rolled so far to port that water flooded the port boiler intakes, temporarily shutting down the port engine, and washing five men overboard. After passing the surprised forts the ships were able to land their troops and capture the forts with little difficulty. All of the destroyers had suffered storm damage en route and were low on fuel because none of the oil tankers had arrived yet. Admiral Hipper was ordered home on 10 April. Fuel was transferred from Paul Jacobi and Bruno Heinemann to Friedrich Eckoldt, enough to allow her to escort the cruiser home. Paul Jacobi remained in Trondheim until early May with engine troubles. Her aft torpedo tubes were removed and remounted on a pair of impounded small boats to improve the local defenses. In 1941 the ship was fitted with a FuMO 21 (Note: Funkmess-Ortung (Radio-direction finder, active ranging)) search radar above the bridge.

She arrived at Wilhelmshaven on 10 May and spent the next month under repair. Paul Jacobi returned to Trondheim on 30 June and helped to screen the crippled battleship Gneisenau as she returned to Kiel on 25 July. The ship laid a minefield in the North Sea before she was transferred to the Atlantic Coast of France in mid-September. Now based at Brest the ship helped to lay a minefield in Falmouth Bay during the night of 28/29 September. Five ships totalling only 2,026 GRT were sunk by this minefield. Paul Jacobi arrived back at Wilhelmshaven to begin a lengthy refit that lasted until October 1941. While departing Aarhus, Denmark for Norway, she fouled a buoy that damaged her port propeller and had to return to Kiel for repairs that took until 24 November. After loading mines at Aarhus, she had a boiler breakdown and had to return to Germany. While docked at Wilhelmshaven on 29 December, Paul Jacobi was slightly damaged by bomb splinters that also killed three crewmen.

She escorted the battleship Tirpitz for several days in mid-January 1942 as the battleship sailed from the Baltic to Trondheim. Paul Jacobi, together with the rest of the 5th Destroyer Flotilla, sailed from Kiel on 24 January for France as part of the preparations for the Channel Dash. On the evening of 25 January, Z8 Bruno Heinemann struck two mines laid by HMS Plover off the Belgian coast and sank. Paul Jacobi rescued 34 of the survivors and proceeded to Le Havre to put them ashore before reaching Brest on the 26th. The German ships departed Brest on 11 February, totally surprising the British. Paul Jacobi helped to repel an attack by five British destroyers and evaded a series of aerial attacks without damage. Shortly afterwards, the ship joined four other destroyers in escorting Prinz Eugen and the heavy cruiser Admiral Scheer to Trondheim. Heavy weather forced Paul Jacobi and two other destroyers to return to port before reaching Trondheim and Prinz Eugen was badly damaged by a British submarine after their separation. On 6 March, the battleship Tirpitz, escorted by Paul Jacobi and three other destroyers, sortied to attack the returning convoy QP 8 and the Russia-bound PQ 12 as part of Operation Sportpalast (Sports Palace), but the ship was ordered back to port that evening. Two months later, in Operation Zauberflote (Magic Flute), Paul Jacobi, the destroyer Z25, and two torpedo boats escorted the badly damaged heavy cruiser Prinz Eugen from Trondheim to Kiel from 16 to 18 May. Two days after her arrival, the destroyer began a lengthy refit that lasted until December.

On 9 January 1943, together with two other destroyers, she escorted Scharnhorst and Prinz Eugen as they attempted to return to Norway from Gotenhafen. The ships were spotted en route two days later by an aircraft from the Royal Air Force and the attempt was abandoned as the element of surprise was lost. The following month, Paul Jacobi made her way independently to Bogen Bay, Norway. She screened the battleships Tirpitz and Scharnhorst, as well as Lützow to the Altafjord, closer to the Allied convoy routes to Russia, in mid-March. Two weeks later, the ship, her sister Z6 Theodor Riedel, and the destroyer Z20 Karl Galster sailed for Jan Mayen island on 31 March to rendezvous with the blockade runner, MV Regensburg. They searched for several days before increasingly heavy weather forced them to return to port with storm damage. Unbeknownst to the Germans, Regensburg had been intercepted and sunk by a British cruiser on 30 March. Paul Jacobi escorted Lützow back to Kiel in September and then began yet another lengthy refit on 30 September.

The ship was badly damaged during an air raid on Kiel on 13 December. One bomb struck the forecastle and started a severe fire while four others landed inside the dry dock itself, riddling her with splinters and sinking the ship. Paul Jacobi was not refloated until April and the refit itself was not completed until November. The ship had to be fitted with a new bow section, her radar was replaced by a FuMO 24 search radar and her foremast was rebuilt in a goal-post shape to allow the 6-by-2-meter (19.7 ft × 6.6 ft) antenna to fully rotate. A FuMO 63 K Hohentwiel radar replaced the searchlight on its platform abaft the rear funnel. After being damaged again by bomb splinters during an air raid on 18 July, she was towed to Swinemünde to be completed. Paul Jacobi was declared operational on 13 November and she escorted the hospital ship SS General von Steuben from Gotenhafen to Swinemünde. The destroyer's new 3.7 cm guns were installed on 20 December. While conducting torpedo training off the Swedish island of Gotland on 14 January 1945, one of her torpedoes circled back around and hit Paul Jacobi, inflicting only minor damage. She was back in action by the 19th, escorting ships in the eastern Baltic Sea. During one of these missions, the ship was accidentally rammed in the stern by the freighter SS Helga Schröder. Repairs took until 27 February to complete, and the Kriegsmarine took advantage of the opportunity to add more AA guns.

Paul Jacobi bombarded Soviet forces on 6–9 March and alternated between bombardment and escort tasks for the rest of the war as the Germans evacuated East Prussia in the face of advancing Soviet armies. On 2 May, her gyrocompass was sabotaged by some of her crew to prevent the ship from screening the last few refugee convoys. Three men were convicted by a drumhead court-martial and sentenced to death by Rear Admiral (Konteradmiral) Bernhard Rogge. Paul Jacobi was decommissioned five days later at Flensburg and sailed to Wilhelmshaven under British control on 21 May to have her fate determined. France was initially denied any of the captured ships, but eventually received Paul Jacobi and three other destroyers. She arrived in Cherbourg on 15 January 1946 and was turned over to the French on 4 February.

Renamed Desaix that same day, after General Louis Desaix, the ship was assigned to the 1st Division of Large Destroyers (contre-torpilleurs) and conducted trials in September. In March–June 1947, she formed part of the escort for the battleship Richelieu as the President of France, Vincent Auriol, visited West and North Africa. Desaix visited North Africa by herself later that year. She took part in the spring naval maneuvers in 1948 and in a naval review for Auriol off Brest on 30 May. The ship was present in Saint-Malo during the commemoration of the centenary of the death of François-René de Chateaubriand and she visited Bordeaux before returning to Cherbourg on 4 November. Desaix was decommissioned before the end of the year and reduced to reserve in January 1949. She was used as a source of spare parts until she was condemned on 17 February 1954. Her hulk was redesignated as Q02 and she was sold for scrap in June. She was towed to Rouen for demolition.
