= 1622 in Norway =

- Centuries: 17th; 18th; 19th
- Decades: 1600s; 1610s; 1620s; 1630s; 1640s
- See also: 1622 in Denmark; List of years in Norway

Events in the year 1622 in Norway.

== Incumbents ==
- Monarch: Christian IV.

== Events ==
- The town of Grimstad was founded.
- Johanne Pedersdatter was executed for witchcraft in Stavanger.

== Births ==
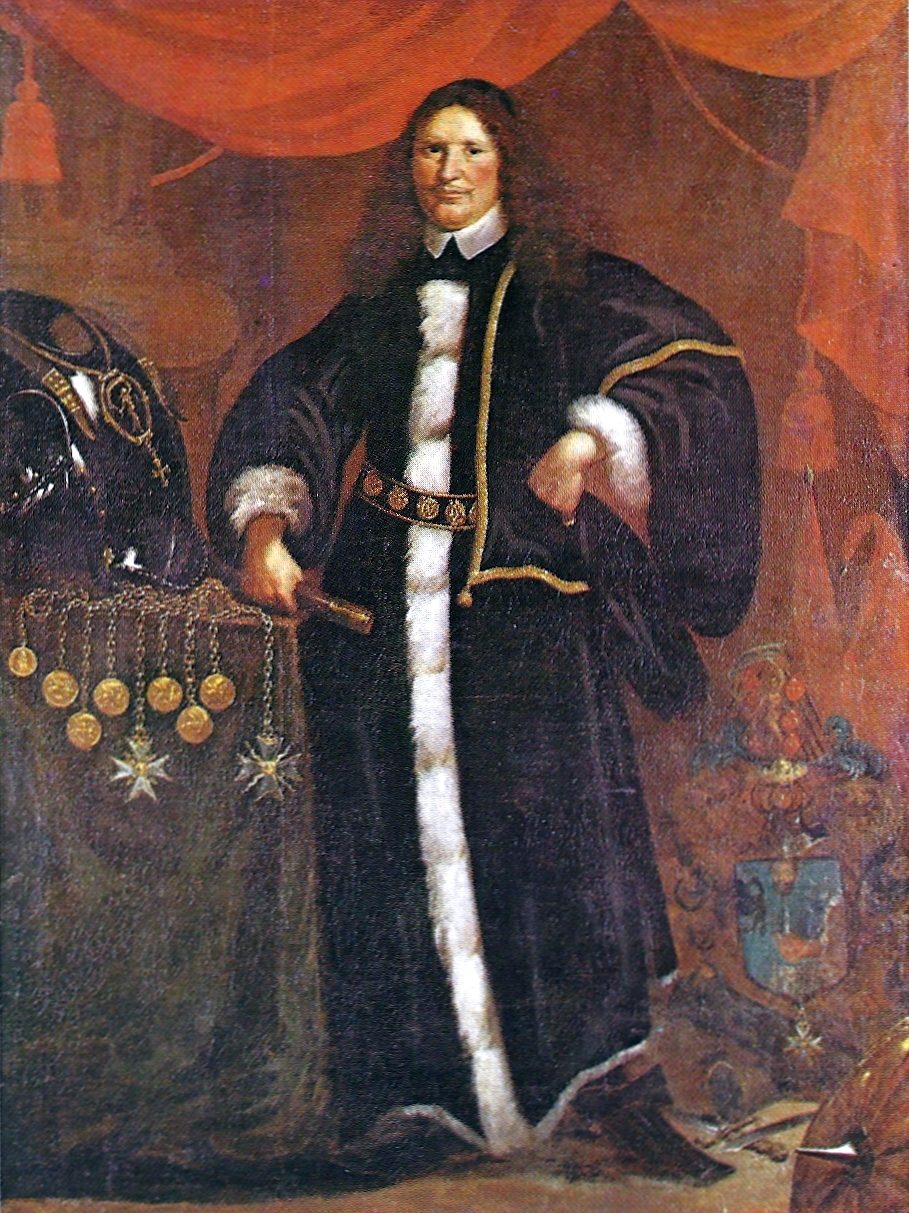
Cort Adeler

- 16 December – Cort Adeler, naval officer, admiral (died 1675).

== Deaths ==
- Johanne Pedersdatter, alleged witch (born c.1583).
