= Vardøhus Fortress =

Fortress in Finnmark, Norway

- Vardø, Finnmark, Norway
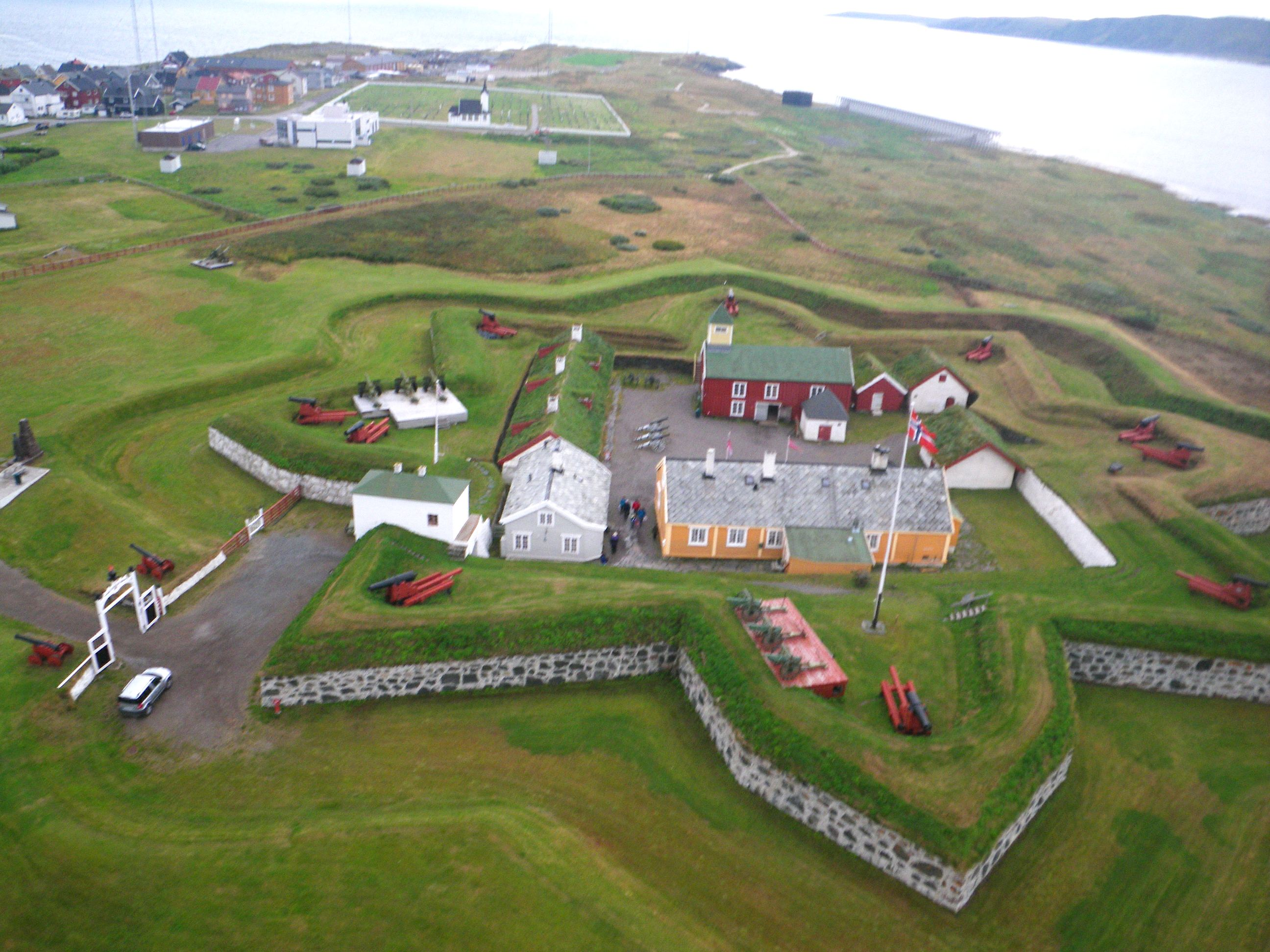
- Fortress as seen from air

Site information
- Type: Star fort
- Controlled by: Norway (1306–1380; 1814–1940; 1944–present); Denmark–Norway (1380–1814); Nazi Germany (1940–1944)
- Website: Vardøhus Fortress

Location
- Coordinates: 70°22′20″N 31°05′41″E

Site history
- Built: 1306, 1450–1500, 1940–1944
- In use: 1306–present
- Materials: Brick, earth, sand, stone and wood
- Battles/wars: Norwegian campaign (1940)

Garrison information
- Current commander: Orlogskaptein Roger Hoel
- Garrison: Commander and four soldiers

Vardøhus Fortress (Norwegian: Vardøhus festning), called "Wardhouse" in English historical navigations, is located in Vardø Municipality in Finnmark county, Norway. It is located in the town of Vardø on the island of Vardøya on the Barents Sea near the mouth of the Varangerfjord in northeastern Norway near the Russian border.

== History ==
In 1251, an embassy from the Republic of Novgorod to King Haakon IV Haakonson of Norway complained of clashes between the Norwegians and the Karelians in northern Finnmark. A Norwegian embassy was dispatched to Novgorod where a treaty (the original of which is now lost) was signed to conclude a peace between the two countries, including the Novgorod tributary land of Karelia.

The Finnmark coast was originally important as a source of furs from the trade with the Karelians, but this trade dropped off as the Hanseatic League increased the fur trade through their Novgorod centre. Finnmark remained important as a fishery; the fish was shipped as stockfish to Bergen and traded there with the Hansa merchants.

=== Varghøya ===
The first fortification was erected by Haakon V Magnusson in 1306 and was called Varghøya. It is not known how long this fort was manned, but in 1307 the Archbishop of Trondhjem went to Vardøhus to consecrate the new Vardø Church. The earliest record still extant which defines the border between Norway and Russia is from 1326. In 1340, records show the Archbishop made further efforts to improve conditions there.

=== Østervågen ===
The second fortification to be built was in Østervågen (the "East Bay") which was erected between 1450 and 1500. This fortification was rectangular with two corner bastions. It appears on various maps from the 14th and 15th century.

The Captain of Vardøhus owned a share of the fishery. While visiting the fort in 1511, Erik Valkendorf wrote: "the country would not be habitable for Christians were it not that the catch of fish is so plentiful as to attract people to settle down there. And this dried fish, which they call 'stockfish', is so valuable and excellent that it is exported to nearly every Christian country."

In 1583, the Norwegian rights to the Arctic Sea were formally recognized by England; the agreement stipulated that each vessel which passed into the White Sea was to stop at Vardøhus to pay duty.

In 1597, Boris Godunov, the regent of Russia, wrote to King Christian IV of Denmark and Norway, asserting that Vardøhus and "the Lapp country (as far as Tromsø) was from ancient times a perpetual patrimony of the Czar." In 1600, Godunov, now the tsar of Russia, refused to ratify the Treaty of Tyavzino which resolved conflicting Swedish and Russian claims to the Kola Peninsula to the east of Vardøhus as well as other territories both claimed. This treaty did not acknowledge the Norwegian presence at Vardøhus nor the Norwegian claims to this territory. As a result of these border conflicts with Russia, King Christian IV of Denmark and Norway asserted Norway's historic ownership and visited Vardøhus in 1599 to instruct the governor of Vardøhus to collect taxes from Russians in his province, including the Kola peninsula and to exclude the Swedes, who were also attempting to claim the territory based on the Treaty of Tyavzino. At this time, Vardøhus was so decrepit that he continued to live on board his ship, Victor. His name has been preserved as it was carved on a beam from the 1599 fort to commemorate the visit. As a further effort at improving his hold on Finnmark, Christian IV built the fortress of Altenhus near Alta in 1610.

=== Vardøhus ===
By the 1730s, Vardøhus had become decrepit. The seat of government of Finnmark was transferred from Vardøhus to Altengaard. Major upgrades to the current fortress began in 1738.

== Modern history ==
Vardøhus did not see enemy action until the 20th century. The last time the fortifications were on active anti-invasion duty was during the First World War. The Second World War saw the fortress used as an anti-aircraft site and as a POW camp before the German occupation.

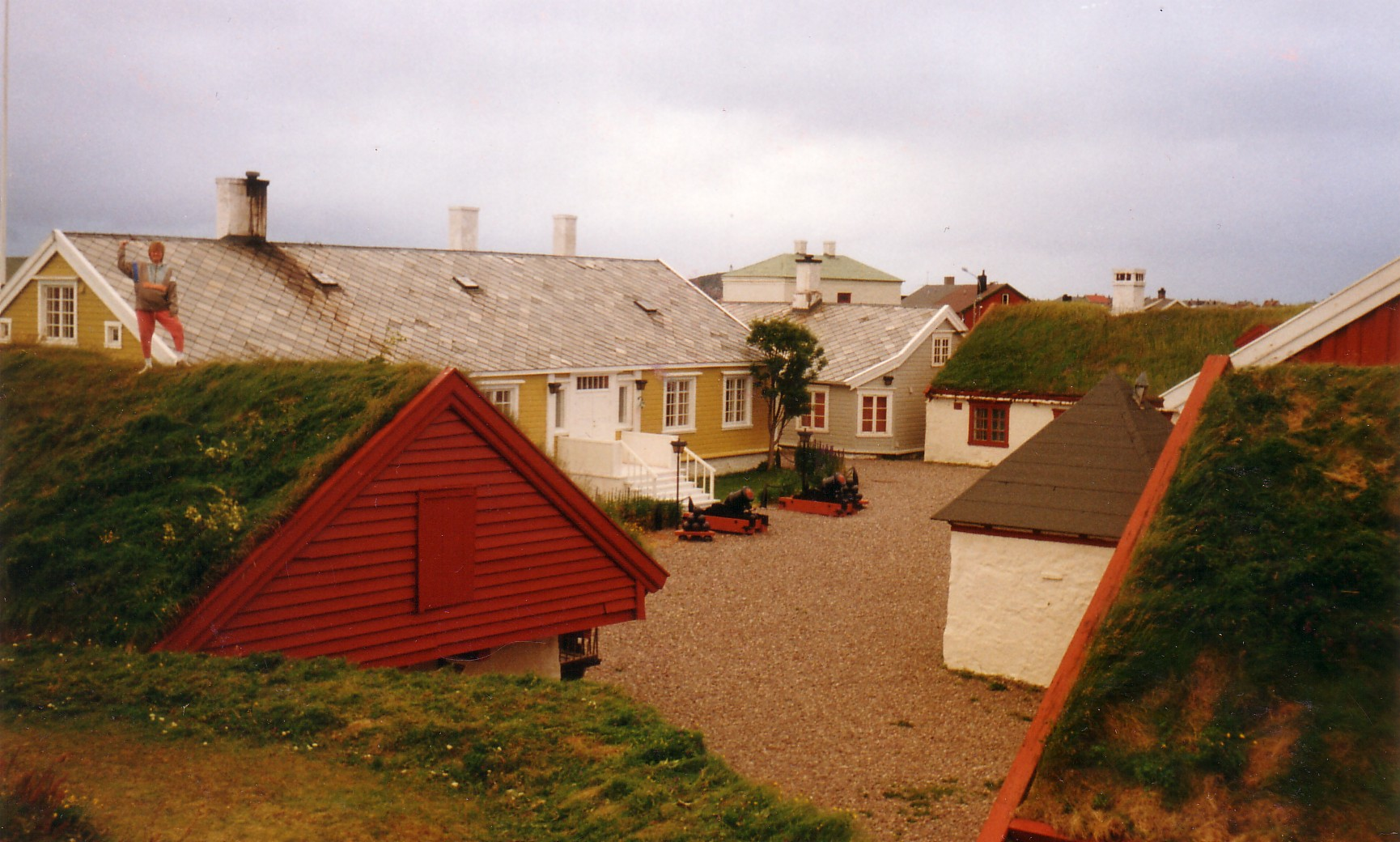
Interior of Vardøhus Fortress in 1989, showing Vardø's sole tree, which was cut down in 2002 after rotting due to the harsh climate. It has been replaced.

=== Second World War ===
During the period from the beginning of the Second World War to the German invasion of Norway, Vardøhus Fortress was an active unit under the command of Naval District no. 3 in Tromsø. For a time during the Winter War, 15-20 Finnish soldiers were interned at the fortress after being pushed across the border from Northern Finland by Soviet offensives.

==== Norwegian Campaign ====
At the outbreak of the German invasion on 9 April 1940, Vardøhus was under the command of Captain Johan Basilier. The garrison consisted of one retired lieutenant, two privates, ten non-combatant military personnel, and two civilians.

The weapons at the disposal of the garrison in 1940 were:

- Four Krupp m/1887 8.4 cm field guns
- Two turn-of-the-century model 37 mm Armstrong cannon (on loan from the Royal Norwegian Navy since 1914)
- One Hotchkiss m/1896 65 mm cannon
- One Maxim m/1898 37 mm autocannon
- Initially one heavy machine gun of unknown make, several more added to the arsenal during the campaign
- Two m/1915 Madsen machine guns in 6.5×55mm Krag calibre

During the evening of 9 April 1940 Captain Basilier received orders to mobilize a small number of additional soldiers to guard the fortress. With the announcement of general mobilization on 11 April further troops were called in for service.

Captain Basilier, who had been suffering from poor health since Easter that year, took sick leave on 13 April and was replaced by Navy Lieutenant B. Bjerkelund. From this date a full mobilization was carried out in the Vardø area, in addition the members of the local rifle association were deployed to guard duty at important objectives. Soon the entire island was under guard, and coast guard and air observation posts were operational. All the different outposts were connected to the fortress via telephone lines. The machine guns at the fortress were readied for use with improvised anti-aircraft mounts produced by a local blacksmith.

A few days after the full mobilization began a force of 150 men were at the disposal of the commander of Vardøhus and by the 10 June cease-fire around 215 men sorted under Vardøhus Fortress.

===== POW camp =====
On 20 April 1940 the commander in chief of Northern Norway, General Carl Gustav Fleischer, issued orders to the 3rd Naval District that an internment camp for German prisoners of war was to be established at Vardøhus. Four days later, on 24 April, the 1,382 ton steamer Nova arrived in port with 155 German POWs. Most of the German prisoners were crew members from the Kriegsmarine destroyer Erich Koellner, sunk at Djupvik on the southern side of the Ofotfjord during the Battles of Narvik. The prisoners included the destroyer's commander, Fregattenkapitän Alfred Schulze-Hinrichs. The prisoners were housed under guard at the Quarantine Detention building. The POW camp at Vardøhus was closed down after a central POW camp for German detainees was established at Skorpa in Troms county and the 155 prisoners shipped to Skorpa on Nova on 13 May. Nova was escorted southwards by the patrol boat Ingrid – a captured German trawler operated by the Royal Norwegian Navy. The prisoners were released from Skorpa on 12 June 1940, after the mainland Norwegian capitulation.

Other military activities at the fortress included the establishment of a 12-bed field hospital and a radio station. From 23 May the fortress came under the command of the newly established East Finnmark Naval District responsible for all RNoN units in eastern Finnmark.

===== Air attack =====
The fortress' sole action with the German invasion forces came on 4 June 1940. Since early May German aircraft had overflown the area without incident, but on 4 June a single Luftwaffe bomber made an attack. The bomber missed its intended target, the radio station, but damaged the church and the commandant's quarters. After expending its bomb load, the bomber flew low and strafed the area, riddling the radio hut and other buildings with bullets. In response to the attack, Corporal Olav Børve returned fire using the 65 mm Hotchkiss gun with case-shot, firing 13 rounds. After a while, the fortress' machine guns also fired back at the aircraft. With at least one of the case-shot rounds damaging the German bomber's hull it limped away from the area with a wounded navigator.

Following the attack, work began on the construction of a new anti-aircraft position on the nearby Kirkeberget hill. The position was completed, but no armaments were installed before the cease-fire went into effect.

==== Surrender and transitional period ====
On 8 June Lieutenant Bjerkelund was informed that the fighting in Norway was coming to a close and given the opportunity to evacuate to the United Kingdom. Seizing the opportunity, Bjerkelund left for Rosyth that same day on the patrol boat Nordhav II. Bjerkelund was replaced as commander by coastal artillery lieutenant H. Johannesen later in the day. Of the ten officers and NCOs and 214 men at the fortress all but 12 of the men were demobilized on 9 June. The officers, NCOs and the dozen privates were to continue to serve until the arrival of German occupation forces.

===== "Flag war" =====
With the first Germans arriving only on 17 July, Vardøhus became the last armed unit under a Norwegian flag to lay down their arms during the Norwegian Campaign. This occurred on 20 July, when German soldiers took down the Norwegian flag. Between 20 and 25 July no flag flew over Vardøhus, as the Germans had ordered the Norwegian soldiers not raise the flag again.

However, since the Norwegian interpreted the order as only to not raise the State flag, they instead raised the Civil ensign on 25 July. From that day until 7 November the Norwegian flag flew at least part of every day, five times being removed by German soldiers who raised their own, which was replaced when they left. Each time the Nazi flag was burnt.

During this time Captain Rynning was the fortress commander and served as a symbol of Norwegian sovereignty and as a buffer between German military authorities and the Norwegian military and civilian authorities. This, and "the flag war", continued until Rynning was arrested on the order of Reichskommissar Josef Terboven on 7 November. Rynning spent the next two years as a political prisoner at Grini and Møllergata 19 in Norway. In December 1942 Rynning was given prisoner of war status and deported to camps in Germany and occupied Poland for the rest of the war, returning on 7 June 1945.

==== German occupation ====
During the occupation the Germans improved the fortifications in the Vardø area, among other things building two coastal artillery batteries. Vardøhus was utilised by the occupiers as a barracks for the crews manning the modern German-built fortifications. In 1944, as the Germans retreated from Finland through Finnmark before the advancing Finns, General Lothar Rendulic ordered a scorched earth policy. Vardø was burned, with only a few houses remaining. Even though the German coastal artillery batteries were demolished before the Germans left, Vardøhus was left intact, although in a miserable state of disrepair.

=== Post-World War II ===
==== Prison ====
During the immediate post-war period, from 1945 to 1947, the fortress was demilitarised and used as a prison for people convicted of treason in the post-war legal purge. In 1947, Vardøhus was returned to fortress status manned by a commander and a few privates.

==== Salute fortress ====
The command of the fort is now the responsibility of the Royal Norwegian Navy, with a commanding officer and four seamen stationed there. Today the fort has few practical military purposes and serves primarily as a salute fortress, firing gun salutes on Norwegian Constitution Day (17 May), dissolution of the Union with Sweden Day (7 June) and on all royal birthdays.

The fortress is unique for the fact that, on the winter day that the sun can again be seen from the fortress walls after the period of continuous darkness, the fortress guns fire a two-round salute. The gunshots announce to the school pupils of Vardø that they have the rest of the day off in celebration of the return of the sun.

==== Museum ====
As the Fortress has mainly the same appearance today as in 1738 it serves as a piece of cultural and military history. The fortress is open to the public and houses a museum.

== Commanding officers ==
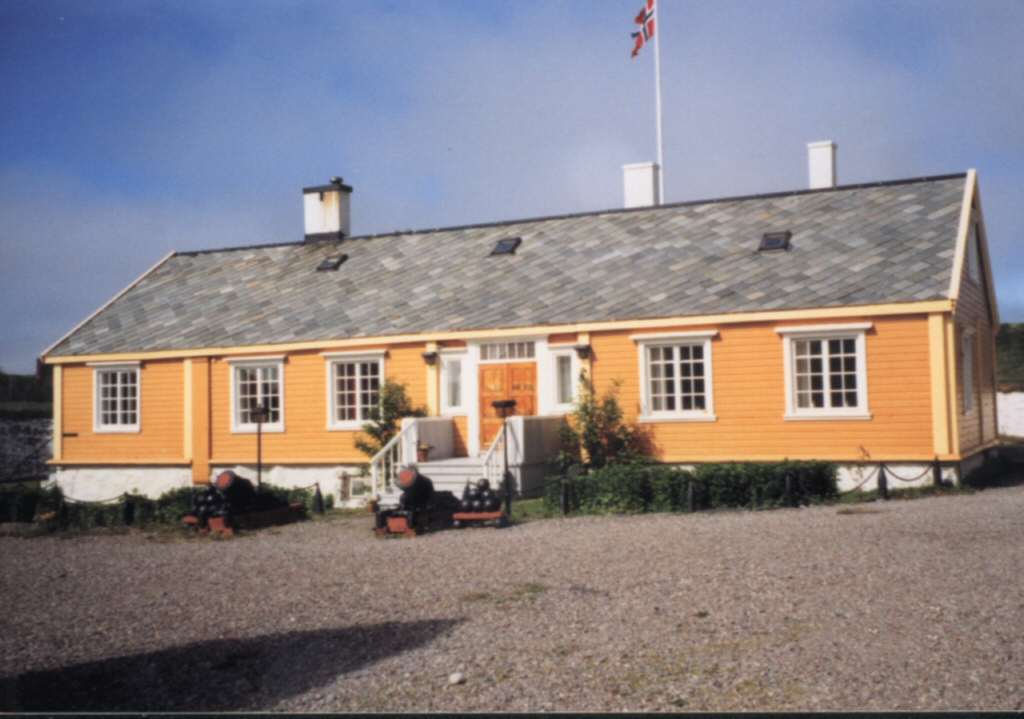
Officer's quarters at Vardøhus Fortress

(incomplete listing)

- Lieutenant Colonel Carl Albert von Passow (1739-1755)
- Major Peter Hanson With (Huid) (1755-1757)
- Jørgen Rosenkrantz (1757-1759)
- Major Conrad Henrich Ecklef (1759-1780)
- Major Otto Christian Rosenkrantz (1780-1785)
- Major Hartvig Segelcke (1786-1787)
- Major Hans Friderich Gemtze (Giemtze) (1788-1793)
- No commander (1793-1800)
- Captain Hans Jørgen Jacob Trost (1800–1802)
- Captain Ole Christopher Broch (Brock) (–June 24,1812)
- Captain Christian Andreas Hiorth (June 24, 1812–1815)
- Captain Johan Audensen (Anderson) Frey (1815–1818)
- First Lieutenant Gottfried Pleym (1818–1823)
- First Lieutenant Hermann Niciolai Scharfenberg (1823–1829)
- First Lieutenant Haldor Lykke (1829–1830)
- First Lieutenant Eilert Hegrem (1830–1832)
- First Lieutenant Reinert Ulfers(1832–1833)
- First Lieutenant Petter Heiberg Ross (born 1789–died 1838) July 12,1833–November 2, 1838)
- Captain Paul Conradi (1839–1852)
- Captain Christian Fredrik Wilhelm Scharffenberg (1853–1859)
- Captain Nicolai Beichmann (1859–1865)
- First Lieutenant Hans Juell Borchgrevink (1865–1866)
- Captain J.A. William T. Apenes (1866–1868)
- Captain Carl Schulz (1868–1890)
- Captain V. Graf Lonnevig (1890–1894)
- Major Maurice Cock Arnesen (1884–1914)
- Major Axel Fredrik Holter (1915–1934)
- Captain Johan Basilier Basilier (1935–13 April 1940)
- Lieutenant (Navy) B. Bjerkelund (13 April–8 June 1940)
- Lieutenant H. Johannesen (8–18 June 1940)
- Captain (Navy) Roald Rye Rynning (June 18, 1940–November 7, 1940)
- 1945–1947: No commander, used as prison.
- Major Erik Presterud (1947–1955)
- Major H. Willoch (1955–1957)
- Major (War Captain) K. Munck (1959–1970)
- War Captain A.J. Toreid (1970)
- Commander Captain J. R. Nordli (1971–1974)
- Lieutenant Commander P. M. Jakobsen (1974–1980)
- Lieutenant Commander Per Evensen (1980–1987)
- Lieutenant Commander F. Th. Erichsen (1987–1988)
- Lieutenant Commander A. Hallaren (1988–1991)
- Lieutenant Commander S. H. Kristiansen (1991–1993)
- Lieutenant Commander R. S. Kvien (1993–1999)
- Commander Ivar Olaf Halse (1999–2003)
- Commander Lasse Haughom (June 2003–June 2005)
- Commander Lars Andreas Rognan (June 2005–August 2008)
- Major Tor Arild Melby (August 2008–2010)
- Commander Åge Leif Godø (August 2010–2011).
- Commander Elisabeth Eikeland (August 2011–2014).
- Commander Tor Arild Melby (August 2014–2015).
- Commander Odd Inge Haravik (August 2015–August 2020)
- Orlogskaptein Roger Hoel (August 2020–March 2023)
- Major Jan Erik Meldgaard(2023–)

== Bibliography ==
- Fjeld, Odd T. (1999). Klar til strid - Kystartilleriet gjennom århundrene (in Norwegian). Oslo: Kystartilleriets Offisersforening. ISBN 82-995208-0-0.
- Hafsten, Bjørn; Ulf Larsstuvold; Bjørn Olsen; Sten Stenersen (2005). Flyalarm – luftkrigen over Norge 1939–1945 (in Norwegian) (2nd, revised ed.). Oslo: Sem og Stenersen AS. ISBN 82-7046-074-5.
- Stjern, Ivar: Ingeniørvåpnet i Nord-Norge gjennom hundre år, Forsvarets Overkommando/InfoMediaHuset AS, Oslo 2003 ISBN 82-07-02060-1 (in Norwegian)
- The Northern Wars, 1558-1721 by Robert I. Frost; Longman, Harlow, England; 2000. ISBN 0-582-06429-5
- Norges festninger by Guthorm Kavli; Universitetsforlaget; 1987; ISBN 82-00-18430-7
- Christian 4.s Finnmarkreise in 1599 by Einar Niemi, Foreningen til Norske Fortidsminnesmerkers Bevaring, Oslo, 1988.
- Sandberg, Rei (1945). Vi ville slåss (in Norwegian). Oslo: Gyldendal Norsk Forlag.
- North Norway by Frank Noel Stagg, George Allen and Unwin, Ltd., 1952.
- Steen, E. A. (1958). Norges sjøkrig 1940-45: Sjøforsvarets kamper og virke i Nord-Norge i 1940 (in Norwegian). Vol. 4. Gyldendal Norsk Forlag.
