= 1623 in Norway =

- Centuries: 16th; 17th; 18th; 19th
- Decades: 1600s; 1610s; 1620s; 1630s; 1640s
- See also: 1623 in Denmark; List of years in Norway

Events in the year 1623 in Norway:

== Incumbents ==
- Monarch: Christian IV

== Events ==
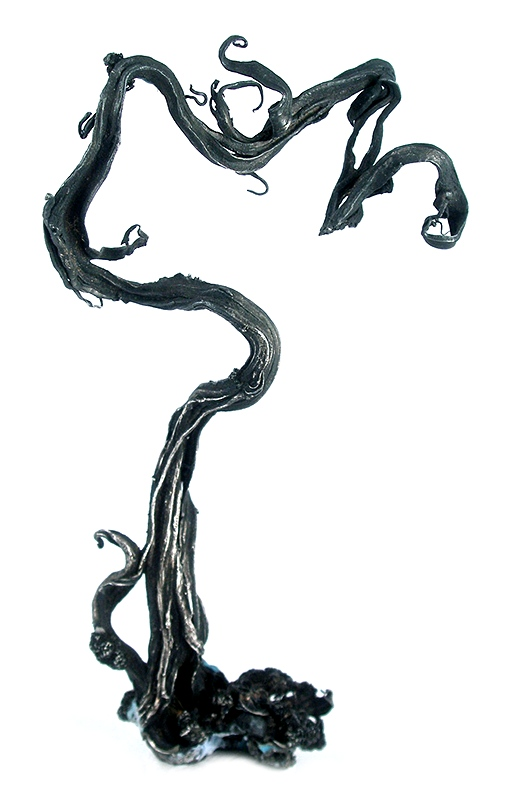
Specimen of Kongsberg acanthite-silver

- July - Discovery of silver in Buskerud. Led to the founding of Kongsberg and the Kongsberg Silver Mines in 1624.
