= 1615 in Norway =

- Centuries: 16th; 17th; 18th; 19th
- Decades: 1590s; 1600s; 1610s; 1620s; 1630s
- See also: 1615 in Denmark; List of years in Norway

Events in the year 1615 in Norway.

== Incumbents ==
- Monarch: Christian IV.

== Events ==
- Bærum Iron Works is established.

== Births ==
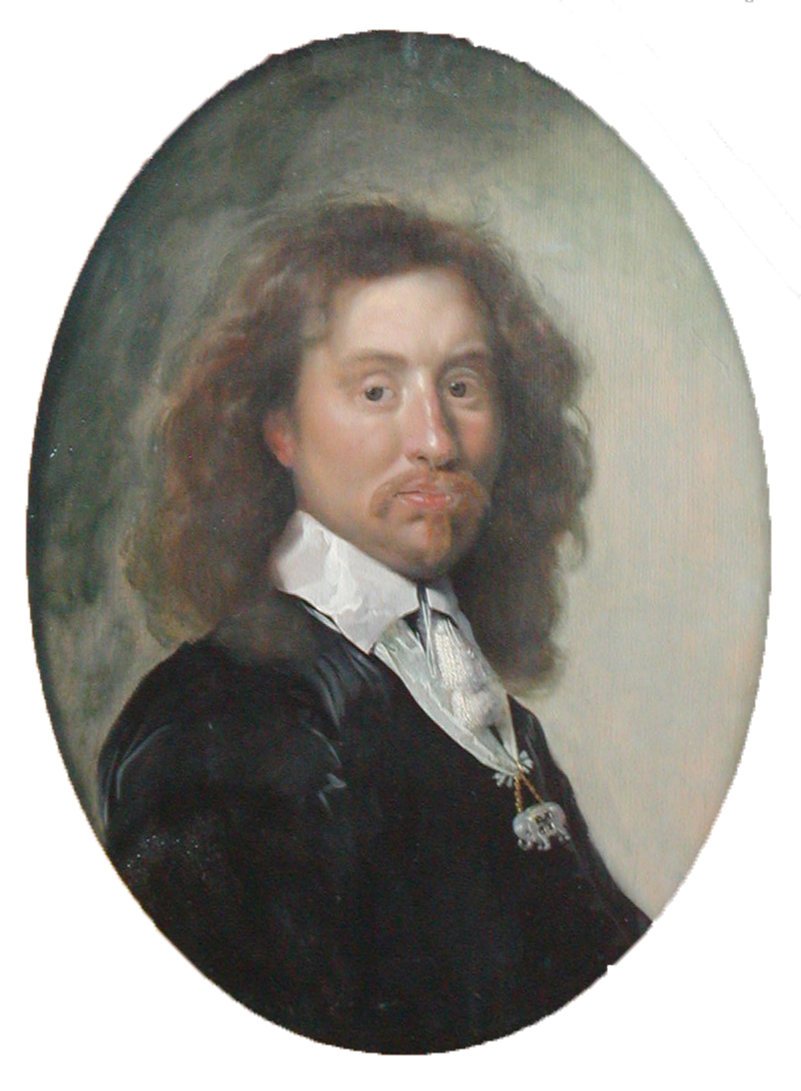
Henrik Bjelke

- 13 January - Henrik Bjelke, admiral (died 1683).

=== Probable ===
- Lauritz Galtung, admiral and land owner (died 1661)
