= 1612 in Norway =

- Centuries: 16th; 17th; 18th; 19th
- Decades: 1590s; 1600s; 1610s; 1620s; 1630s
- See also: 1612 in Denmark; List of years in Norway

Events in the year 1612 in Norway.

== Incumbents ==
- Monarch: Christian IV.

== Events ==
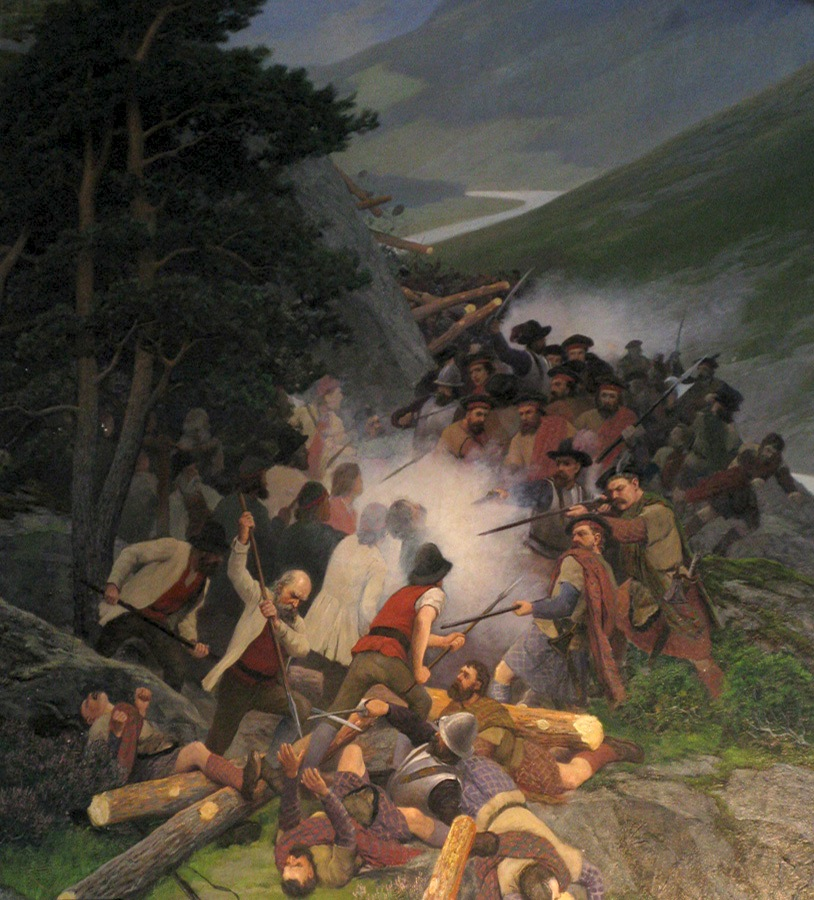
Detail of the painting Battle of Kringen, a nineteenth century national romantic depiction of Battle of Kringen 1612.

- Kalmar War:
  - 26 February – Massacre in Nya Lödös, 300 Norwegian soldiers are massacred inside a church in Nya Lödöse, Sweden.
  - July - August – Mönnichhoven's march (Mönnichhoven-marsjen).
  - 26 August – Battle of Kringen.
  - Fall – Swedish forces under Baltzar Bäck leaves Jemtland and Herjedalen, after being occupied since 1611.
  - The town of Konghelle was burned down by Swedish troops, then moved closer to Bohus Fortress, and renamed Kongelf.

== Deaths ==
- 26 August – George Sinclair, mercenary (born c. 1580).
