= 1614 in Norway =

- Centuries: 16th; 17th; 18th; 19th
- Decades: 1590s; 1600s; 1610s; 1620s; 1630s
- See also: 1614 in Denmark; List of years in Norway

Events in the year 1614 in Norway.

== Incumbents ==
- Monarch: Christian IV.

== Events ==
- 8 December - Jens Bjelke became Chancellor of Norway.
- The first written records of the Lesjaverk Ironworks.

== Deaths ==
- 15 October - Peder Claussøn Friis, author (born 1545)
