= 1608 in Norway =

- Centuries: 16th; 17th; 18th; 19th
- Decades: 1580s; 1590s; 1600s; 1610s; 1620s
- See also: 1608 in Denmark; List of years in Norway

Events in the year 1608 in Norway.

== Incumbents ==
- Monarch: Christian IV.

== Events ==
- Enevold Kruse was named Governor-general of Norway.

== Births ==
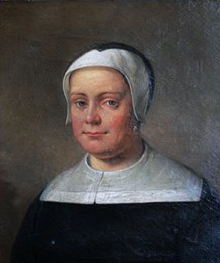
Margareta Huitfeldt

- 5 November – Margareta Huitfeldt, noblewomen, estate owner (died 1683).

== Deaths ==
- Hallvard Gunnarssøn, educator and non-fiction writer (born c.1550).
