= German destroyer Z8 Bruno Heinemann =

Type 1934A-class destroyer

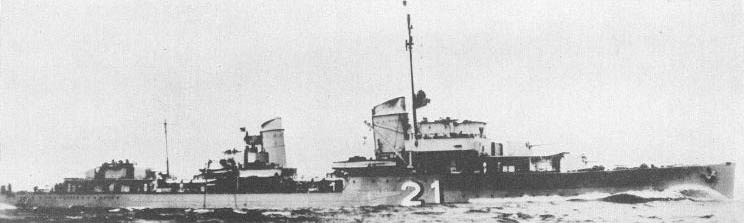
- Sister ship Z5 Paul Jakobi c. 1938

History

Nazi Germany
- Name: Z8 Bruno Heinemann
- Namesake: Bruno Heinemann
- Ordered: 9 January 1935
- Builder: DeSchiMAG, Bremen
- Yard number: W902
- Laid down: 14 January 1936
- Launched: 15 September 1936
- Completed: 8 January 1938
- Fate: Sunk by mines, 25 January 1942

General characteristics (as built)
- Class & type: Type 1934A-class destroyer
- Displacement: 2,171 long tons (2,206 t) (standard); 3,110 long tons (3,160 t) (deep load)
- Length: 119 m (390 ft 5 in) o/a; 114 m (374 ft 0 in) w/l
- Beam: 11.30 m (37 ft 1 in)
- Draft: 4.23 m (13 ft 11 in)
- Installed power: 70,000 PS (51,000 kW; 69,000 shp); 6 × water-tube boilers
- Propulsion: 2 shafts, 2 × geared steam turbines
- Speed: 36 knots (67 km/h; 41 mph)
- Range: 1,530 nmi (2,830 km; 1,760 mi) at 19 knots (35 km/h; 22 mph)
- Complement: 325
- Armament: 5 × single 12.7 cm (5 in) guns; 2 × twin 3.7 cm (1.5 in) AA guns; 6 × single 2 cm (0.8 in) AA guns; 2 × quadruple 53.3 cm (21 in) torpedo tubes; 60 mines; 32–64 depth charges, 4 throwers and 6 individual racks

Z8 Bruno Heinemann was a Type 1934A-class destroyer built for Nazi Germany's Kriegsmarine in the mid-1930s. After the start of World War II in September 1939, she blockaded the Polish coast and searched neutral shipping for contraband. In late 1939 and early 1940 the ship made three successful minelaying sorties off the English coast that claimed 17 merchant ships. Bruno Heinemann participated in the early stages of the Norwegian Campaign by transporting troops to the Trondheim area in early April 1940. The ship was transferred to France a year later to escort German ships that used the French ports on the Atlantic coast. She was returning to France in early 1942 when she struck two mines and sank off the coast of Belgium.

== Design and description ==
Bruno Heinemann had an overall length of 119 meters (390 ft 5 in) and was 114 meters (374 ft 0 in) long at the waterline. The ship had a beam of 11.30 meters (37 ft 1 in), and a maximum draft of 4.23 meters (13 ft 11 in). She displaced 2,171 metric tons (2,137 long tons) at standard and 3,110 metric tons (3,060 long tons) at deep load. The Wagner geared steam turbines were designed to produce 70,000 metric horsepower (51,485 kW; 69,042 shp) which would propel the ship at 36 knots (67 km/h; 41 mph). Steam was provided to the turbines by six high-pressure Wagner boilers with superheaters. Bruno Heinemann carried a maximum of 752 metric tons (740 long tons) of fuel oil which was intended to give a range of 4,400 nmi (8,100 km; 5,100 mi) at 19 knots (35 km/h; 22 mph), but the ship proved top-heavy in service and 30% of the fuel had to be retained as ballast low in the ship. The effective range proved to be only 1,530 nmi (2,830 km; 1,760 mi) at 19 knots (35 km/h; 22 mph).

Bruno Heinemann carried five 12.7 cm SK C/34 guns in single mounts with gun shields, two each superimposed, fore and aft. The fifth gun was carried on top of the rear deckhouse. Her anti-aircraft armament consisted of four 3.7 cm SK C/30 guns in two twin mounts abreast the rear funnel and six 2 cm C/30 guns in single mounts. The ship carried eight above-water 53.3-centimeter (21.0 in) torpedo tubes in two power-operated mounts. A pair of reload torpedoes were provided for each mount. Four depth charge throwers were mounted on the sides of the rear deckhouse and they were supplemented by six racks for individual depth charges on the sides of the stern. Enough depth charges were carried for either two or four patterns of 16 charges each. Mine rails could be fitted on the rear deck that had a maximum capacity of 60 mines. A system of passive hydrophones designated as 'GHG' (German: Gruppenhorchgerät) was fitted to detect submarines.

== Construction and career ==
The ship was ordered on 9 January 1935 and laid down at DeSchiMAG, Bremen on 14 January 1936 as yard number W902. She was launched on 15 September 1936 and completed on 8 January 1937. Bruno Heinemann sailed in company with her sister Z5 Paul Jakobi to Norway in April 1938 to test the new 15-centimeter (5.9 in) TbtsK C/36 gun planned for later classes of destroyers. Bruno Heinemann had been fitted with four of the new weapons, but the test was not successful as they seriously affected Bruno Heinemann's stability. The guns were removed after gunnery trials off Ålesund were completed. The ship participated in the August 1938 Fleet Review as part of the 6th Destroyer Division and the following fleet exercise. Early in 1939, she spent several months in the Baltic Sea to evaluate whether reduced steam pressure would solve some of the problems of her high-pressure steam plant.

When World War II began, Bruno Heinemann was initially deployed in the Baltic to operate against the Polish Navy and to enforce a blockade of Poland, but she was soon transferred to the German Bight where she joined her sisters in laying defensive minefields. She also patrolled the Skagerrak to inspect neutral shipping for contraband goods and was also briefly refitted during this time. After completing her refit, Bruno Heinemann and Paul Jakobi were bound for the Baltic via the Kiel Canal when they were attacked by 11 Handley Page Hampden bombers of No. 144 Squadron RAF on 29 September. The British aircraft failed to damage the German ships and five were shot down by Messerschmitt Bf 109E fighters.

Although the other destroyers were busy escorting the German heavy ships and laying minefields off the British coast in October and November, Bruno Heinemann played no part of any of these operations until the night of 12/13 December. Under the command of Commodore Friedrich Bonte in his flagship Hermann Künne, Bruno Heinemann, Richard Beitzen, Friedrich Ihn, and Erich Steinbrinck laid 240 mines off the mouth of the River Tyne, where the navigation lights were still lit. The British were unaware of the minefield's existence and lost eleven ships totaling 18,979 Gross Register Tons (GRT). While withdrawing at high speed Bruno Heinemann suffered a serious fire in one of her turbine rooms and was ordered to heave-to while the fire was put out. The destroyers were later ordered to escort the crippled light cruisers Leipzig and Nürnberg which had been torpedoed by the submarine HMS Salmon while covering the destroyers' withdrawal. Despite their escort, the submarine HMS Ursula managed to sneak inside the anti-submarine screen and fired a salvo of six torpedoes at Leipzig in the Elbe estuary. Two of the torpedoes struck the destroyer escort F9 which sank three minutes later with heavy loss of life, but the other torpedoes missed. On the night of 10/11 January 1940 the ship laid a minefield off Cromer with her sisters Wolfgang Zenker and Erich Koellner. Three ships totaling 11,155 GRT were sunk by this minefield. The same three ships made another sortie on the night of 9/10 February into the same area and laid 157 mines that claimed three more ships totaling 11,855 GRT.

Bruno Heinemann was allocated to Group 2 for the Norwegian portion of Operation Weserübung. The group's task was to transport the 138th Mountain Infantry Regiment (138. Gebirgsjäger Regiment) to seize Trondheim together with the heavy cruiser Admiral Hipper. The ships began loading troops on 6 April and set sail the next day. Bruno Heinemann and her sisters Paul Jakobi and Theodor Riedel each carried a company of mountain troops tasked to seize the forts defending the entrance to the Trondheimsfjord. After passing the surprised forts the ships were able to land their troops and capture the forts with little difficulty. All of the destroyers had suffered storm damage en route and were low on fuel because none of the oil tankers had arrived yet. Admiral Hipper was ordered home on 10 April. Fuel was transferred from Bruno Heinemann and Paul Jakobi to Friedrich Eckoldt sufficient to give the heavy cruiser some anti-submarine protection. However, even this proved to be insufficient fuel, so the Friedrich Eckoldt was ordered to return later that night. Two days later enough fuel had been found in Trondheim to allow Friedrich Eckoldt and Bruno Heinemann to sail on 14 April; they reached Germany the next day without incident. Sometime in 1939–41 the ship was fitted with a FuMO 21 or FuMO 24 radar set above the bridge.

The ship escorted a force of minelayers on the nights of 29/30 April and 9/10 May 1940 in the vicinity of the Great Fisherman's Bank, but the second sortie turned back when British destroyers were spotted. Bruno Heinemann began a lengthy refit later that month and she was still not combat worthy in November. On 5 April 1941, Bruno Heinemann left Germany for Occupied France and she was attacked by two torpedo bombers en route, but suffered no damage. The ship and the other destroyers present escorted commerce raiders, blockade runners and major warships as they used the French Atlantic coast ports until she was recalled on 6 September for another refit. Bruno Heinemann probably was fitted at this time with a four-barrel 2-centimeter AA gun on her aft deckhouse that replaced the pair of 2-centimeter guns originally mounted there. She escorted the battleship Tirpitz in mid-January 1942 as she sailed from the Baltic to Trondheim. Bruno Heinemann, together with the rest of the 5th Destroyer Flotilla, sailed from Kiel on 24 January for France as part of the preparations for the Channel Dash. On the evening of 25 January, she struck two mines laid by HMS Plover off the Belgian coast. The first detonated beneath the ship and knocked out Nos. 2 and 3 boiler rooms and the second blew the ship's bow off shortly afterwards. 98 members of the ship's crew lost their lives: 93 were lost at sea, while another five, who had originally been among the 234 men rescued, died of their wounds.
