= 1618 in Norway =

- Centuries: 17th; 18th; 19th
- Decades: 1600s; 1610s; 1620s; 1630s
- See also: 1618 in Denmark; List of years in Norway

Events in the year 1618 in Norway.

== Incumbents ==
- Monarch: Christian IV.

== Events ==
- Jens Juel was appointed Governor-General of Norway.
- Det Norske Jernkompani (The Norwegian Iron Company) was established.
