= German destroyer Z13 Erich Koellner =

Type 1934A-class destroyer

Coordinates: 68°24′N 16°48′E

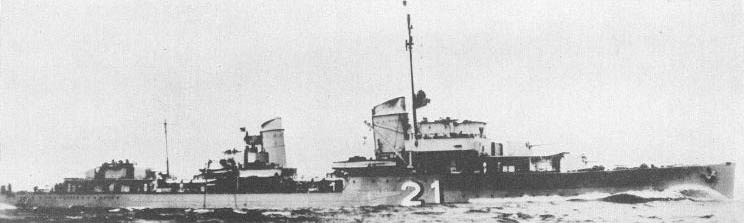
- Her sister ship Z5 Paul Jakobi c. 1938

History

Nazi Germany
- Name: Erich Koellner
- Namesake: Erich Koellner
- Ordered: 10 November 1934
- Builder: Germania, Kiel
- Yard number: G539
- Laid down: 12 October 1935
- Launched: 18 March 1937
- Completed: 28 August 1939
- Fate: Scuttled, 13 April 1940

General characteristics (as built)
- Class & type: Type 1934A-class destroyer
- Displacement: 2,171 long tons (2,206 t) (standard); 3,190 long tons (3,240 t) (deep load)
- Length: 119 m (390 ft 5 in) o/a; 114 m (374 ft 0 in) w/l
- Beam: 11.30 m (37 ft 1 in)
- Draft: 4.23 m (13 ft 11 in)
- Installed power: 70,000 PS (51,000 kW; 69,000 shp); 6 × water-tube boilers
- Propulsion: 2 shafts, 2 × geared steam turbines
- Speed: 36 knots (67 km/h; 41 mph)
- Range: 1,530 nmi (2,830 km; 1,760 mi) at 19 knots (35 km/h; 22 mph)
- Complement: 325
- Armament: 5 × single 12.7 cm (5 in) guns; 2 × twin 3.7 cm (1.5 in) AA guns; 6 × single 2 cm (0.8 in) AA guns; 2 × quadruple 53.3 cm (21 in) torpedo tubes; 60 mines; 32–64 depth charges, 4 throwers and 6 individual racks

Z13 Erich Koellner was a Type 1934A-class destroyer built for Nazi Germany's Kriegsmarine in the late 1930s. At the beginning of World War II, the ship was still working up. In early 1940 she made two successful minelaying sorties off the English coast that claimed six merchant ships. During the early stages of the Norwegian Campaign, Erich Koellner fought in both naval Battles of Narvik in mid-April 1940 and was severely damaged by British ships during the Second Battle of Narvik. The ship was scuttled by her crew shortly afterwards.

== Design and description ==
Erich Koellner had an overall length of 119 meters (390 ft 5 in) and was 114 meters (374 ft 0 in) long at the waterline. The ship had a beam of 11.30 meters (37 ft 1 in), and a maximum draft of 4.23 meters (13 ft 11 in). She displaced 2,171 metric tons (2,137 long tons) at standard and 3,190 metric tons (3,140 long tons) at deep load. The Wagner geared steam turbines were designed to produce 70,000 metric horsepower (51,000 kW; 69,000 shp) which would propel the ship at 36 knots (67 km/h; 41 mph). Steam was provided to the turbines by six high-pressure Benson boilers with superheaters. Erich Koellner carried a maximum of 752 metric tons (740 long tons) of fuel oil which was intended to give a range of 4,400 nautical miles (8,100 km; 5,100 mi) at 19 knots (35 km/h; 22 mph), but the ship proved top-heavy in service and 30% of the fuel had to be retained as ballast low in the ship. The effective range proved to be only 1,530 nmi (2,830 km; 1,760 mi) at 19 knots (35 km/h; 22 mph). The ship's crew consisted of 10 officers and 315 sailors.

Erich Koellner carried five 12.7 cm SK C/34 guns in single mounts with gun shields, two each superimposed, fore and aft. The fifth gun was carried on top of the rear deckhouse. Her anti-aircraft armament consisted of four 3.7 cm SK C/30 guns in two twin mounts abreast the rear funnel and six 2 cm C/30 guns in single mounts. The ship carried eight above-water 53.3-centimeter (21.0 in) torpedo tubes in two power-operated mounts. A pair of reload torpedoes were provided for each mount. Four depth charge throwers were mounted on the sides of the rear deckhouse and they were supplemented by six racks for individual depth charges on the sides of the stern. Enough depth charges were carried for either two or four patterns of 16 charges each. Mine rails could be fitted on the rear deck that had a maximum capacity of 60 mines. 'GHG' (Gruppenhorchgerät) passive hydrophones were fitted to detect submarines.

== Career ==
The ship was ordered on 10 November 1934 and laid down at Germania, Kiel on 12 October 1935 as yard number G539. She was launched on 18 March 1937 and completed on 28 August 1939. Erich Koellner was still on sea trials when World War II began and did not become operational until early January 1940 when she was assigned to the 8th Destroyer Division (8. Zerstörerdivision). Led by Commander (Fregattenkapitän) Erich Bey, Erich Koellner and her sisters Bruno Heinemann, and Wolfgang Zenker laid a minefield off Cromer during the night of 11/12 January that sank three ships totalling 11,153 Gross Register Tons (GRT). The same three ships laid 157 mines near the Haisborough Sands off Cromer on the night of 9/10 February. This minefield sank three ships of 11,885 GRT. During Operation Wikinger, an attempt to capture British fishing trawlers operating off the Dogger Bank on 22 February, two German destroyers hit newly laid British mines in the supposedly mine-free channel and sank. Koellner lost one man overboard while attempting to rescue sailors from the two sunken ships and succeeded in rescuing 24 men.

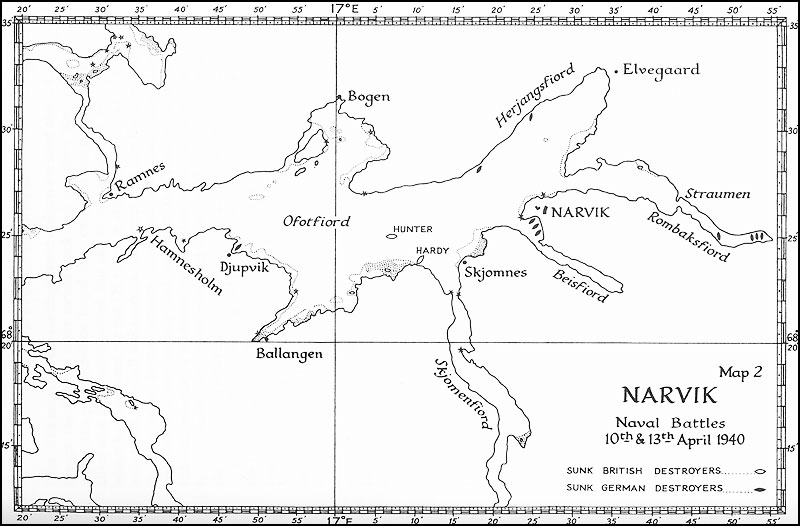
A map of the Ofotfjord

Under the command of Alfred Schulze-Hinrichs, the ship was allocated to Group 1 for the Norwegian portion of Operation Weserübung. The group's task was to transport the 139th Mountain Infantry Regiment (139. Gebirgsjäger Regiment) and the headquarters of the 3rd Mountain Division (3. Gebirgs-Division) to seize Narvik. The ships began loading troops on 6 April and sailed the next day. Erich Koellner suffered storm damage en route and lost two men swept overboard. (Note: Sources disagree on the number of men lost overboard. Koop and Schmolke say two men, but Hildebrand, Röhr and Steinmetz say one, plus two badly injured.) When the destroyers arrived at the Ofotfjord, west of Narvik, on the early morning of 9 April, the three ships of the 4th Flotilla, under the command of Commander Erich Bey, were ordered to land their troops in the Herjangsfjord (a northern branch of the Ofotfjord) in order to capture a Norwegian Army armory at Elvegårdsmoen. The troops encountered little resistance, but off-loading them was slow because there was only a single wooden pier available. Later in the day, Koellner moved to Narvik harbor, but was not able to refuel before she was ordered to return to the Herjangsfjord well before dawn together with her sisters Wolfgang Zenker and Erich Giese.

Shortly before dawn on 10 April, the five destroyers of the British 2nd Destroyer Flotilla surprised the German ships in Narvik harbor. They torpedoed two destroyers and badly damaged the other three while suffering only minor damage themselves. As they were beginning to withdraw they encountered the three destroyers of the German 4th Flotilla which had been alerted when the British began their attack. The Germans opened fire first, but the gunnery for both sides was not effective due to the mist and the smoke screen laid by the British as they retreated down the Ofotfjord. The German ships had to turn away to avoid a salvo of three torpedoes fired by one of the destroyers in Narvik. Giese and Koellner were very low on fuel and all three were running low on ammunition, so Commander Bey decided not to continue the pursuit of the British ships since they were being engaged by the last two destroyers of Group 1.

Commander Bey was ordered during the afternoon of 10 April to return to Germany with all seaworthy ships that evening, but Koellner needed more time to refuel and make repairs. They were completed the following day and the ship was ordered to patrol the mouth of the Ofotfjord that evening for picket duty. She ran aground shortly before midnight and started to take on water through damaged hull plating. She returned to Narvik on the morning of 12 April. Koellner could not be repaired with the resources available to the Germans so she was ordered to Tårstad, inside the Ramnes Narrows at the mouth of the Ofotfjord, to act as a floating battery in case of British attack. The water at Tårstad was too shallow to use torpedoes, so they were off-loaded and transferred to her sisters Bernd von Arnim and Theodor Riedel . Much of her fuel was also transferred to them and 90 men not needed were put ashore.

That night he received word to expect an attack the following day by British capital ships escorted by a large number of destroyers and supported by carrier aircraft. The battleship HMS Warspite and nine destroyers duly appeared on 13 April, although earlier than Commander Bey had expected, and caught the Germans by surprise. Koellner had not been able to reach Tårstad and Lieutenant Commander (Fregattenkapitän) Alfred Schulze-Hinrichs, the ship's captain, had decided to anchor near Djupvik on the south side of the fjord instead. As the British ships approached, Koellner was spotted by the Supermarine Walrus amphibian from Warspite and the leading British destroyers were fully prepared when they came around the headland behind which Koellner was hiding. The range was so close, 2,500–2,500 meters (8,200–8,200 ft), that the three British ships were able to use their light automatic weapons to silence the German ship's guns and they set her on fire as well as blowing off her bow with a torpedo. The 15-inch (380 mm) semi-armor-piercing shells from Warspite went through the ship without detonating, but visibly tilted her over each time. Thirty-one crewmen were killed, and 34 wounded, but none of the British ships were even damaged. Erich Koellner was scuttled shortly afterwards by detonating a depth charge in her auxiliary machinery spaces. In the aftermath of the battle, 155 of the ship's crew, including Schulze-Hinrichs, were taken prisoner by Norwegian forces. The captured crewmen were first incarcerated in Vardøhus Fortress in Finnmark and later transferred to Skorpa prisoner of war camp in Troms until released after the end of the Norwegian Campaign. The wreck was raised and scrapped in 1963.
