= 1621 in Norway =

- Centuries: 16th; 17th; 18th; 19th
- Decades: 1600s; 1610s; 1620s; 1630s; 1640s
- See also: 1621 in Denmark; List of years in Norway

Events in the year 1621 in Norway.

== Incumbents ==
- Monarch: Christian IV.

== Events ==
- January–April – The first Vardø witch trials, in which eleven women were executed by burning at the stake.

== Births ==
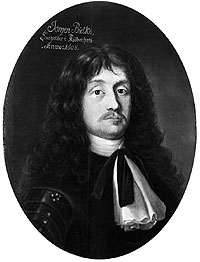
Jørgen Bjelke

- 2 June – Jørgen Bjelke, military officer (died 1696).
