= 1617 in Norway =

- Centuries: 16th; 17th; 18th; 19th
- Decades: 1590s; 1600s; 1610s; 1620s; 1630s
- See also: 1617 in Denmark; List of years in Norway

Events in the year 1617 in Norway.

== Incumbents ==
- Monarch: Christian IV.

== Events ==
- 24 December - Eastern Finnmark suffered a terrible storm. A great majority of the male population was out at sea at that time and were surprised by the storm, ten boats sank and forty men drowned.

== Deaths ==
=== Full date unknown ===
- Niels Claussøn Senning, bishop (born c. 1580).
