= Alfred Schulze-Hinrichs =

- Born: 6 November 1899; Leipzig, German Empire
- Died: 23 June 1972 (aged 72); Waldshut-Tiengen, West Germany
- Military career
- Allegiance: Weimar Republic; Nazi Germany
- Branch: Reichsmarine; Kriegsmarine
- Rank: Kapitän zur See
- Commands: Albatros; Z13 Erich Koellner; 6. Zerstörerflottille
- Conflicts: World War II
- Awards: Knight's Cross of the Iron Cross

Alfred Schulze-Hinrichs (6 November 1899 – 23 June 1972) was a Kapitän zur See with the Kriegsmarine during World War II and a recipient of the Knight's Cross of the Iron Cross.

== Career ==
- October 1924: Survey vessel Panther.
- January 1927: Sperrversuchskommando, commander of the torpedo boat G 10.
- October 1930: Commander of the II Torpedobootsflottille.
- 1935: Naval academy.
- October 1940 April: Commander of the destroyer Z13 Erich Koellner in the Narvik campaign.
- December 1941: Chief of Staff at "Admiral Nordmeer" in Kirkenes.
- May 1943 – February 1945: Commander of the Marinekriegsakademie, in Berlin (then in Bad Homburg).
- 1957: Joined the new Bundesmarine.

During the 1940 Norwegian Campaign Schulze-Hinrichs was captured at Narvik after the sinking of his destroyer Erich Koellner. He was imprisoned by the Norwegians, first at Vardøhus Fortress in Finnmark and later at Skorpa prisoner of war camp in Troms until released at the end of that campaign in mid-June 1940.

From November 1940 until April 1943 he commanded the 6th Destroyer Flotilla, acting in Norway and Arctic waters. On 1 May 1942, during action against Convoy QP 11, his destroyer Hermann Schoemann was disabled and scuttled the next day. However, the attack also resulted in the sinking of HMS Edinburgh on 2 May 1942.

== Awards ==
- Wehrmacht Long Service Award 4th to 2nd Class (2 October 1936)
- Iron Cross (1939)
  - 2nd Class (11 January 1940)
  - 1st Class (11 February 1940)
- Destroyer War Badge (19 October 1940)
- Narvik Shield (10 November 1940)
- German Cross in Gold (21 January 1942)
- Knight's Cross of the Iron Cross on 15 June 1943 as Kapitän zur See and chief of the 6. Zerstörerflotille
- Lapland Shield (20 July 1945)

Military offices
Preceded by Kapitän zur See Erich Bey	Chief of the 6. Zerstörerflottille; 1 November 1940 – 30 April 1943	Succeeded by Kapitän zur See Friedrich Kothe
