= 1607 in Norway =

- Centuries: 16th; 17th; 18th; 19th
- Decades: 1580s; 1590s; 1600s; 1610s; 1620s
- See also: 1607 in Denmark; List of years in Norway

Events in the year 1607 in Norway.

== Incumbents ==
- Monarch: Christian IV.

== Events ==
- A new Lutheran Church Ordinance is introduced in Norway.

== Births ==
=== Full date missing ===
- Albert Andriessen Bradt, Norwegian-born settler in New Netherland (died 1686).

== Deaths ==
- 25 January – Anders Foss, bishop (born 1543).
- 18 April – Anders Bendssøn Dall, Danish Lutheran prelate who served as Bishop of Oslo (born c.1550).

=== Full date missing ===
- Anna Throndsen, noblewoman (born c.1540)
