= 1625 in Norway =

- Centuries: 16th; 17th; 18th; 19th
- Decades: 1600s; 1610s; 1620s; 1630s; 1640s
- See also: 1625 in Denmark; List of years in Norway

Events in the year 1625 in Norway.

== Incumbents ==
- Monarch: Christian IV.

== Events ==
- February 23 - The First Gjæsling Accident: 210 fishermen are killed in a storm in the fjord Folda, Trøndelag.
- December 9 – The Treaty of The Hague leads to Denmark-Norway's intervention in the Thirty Years' War.

== Births ==
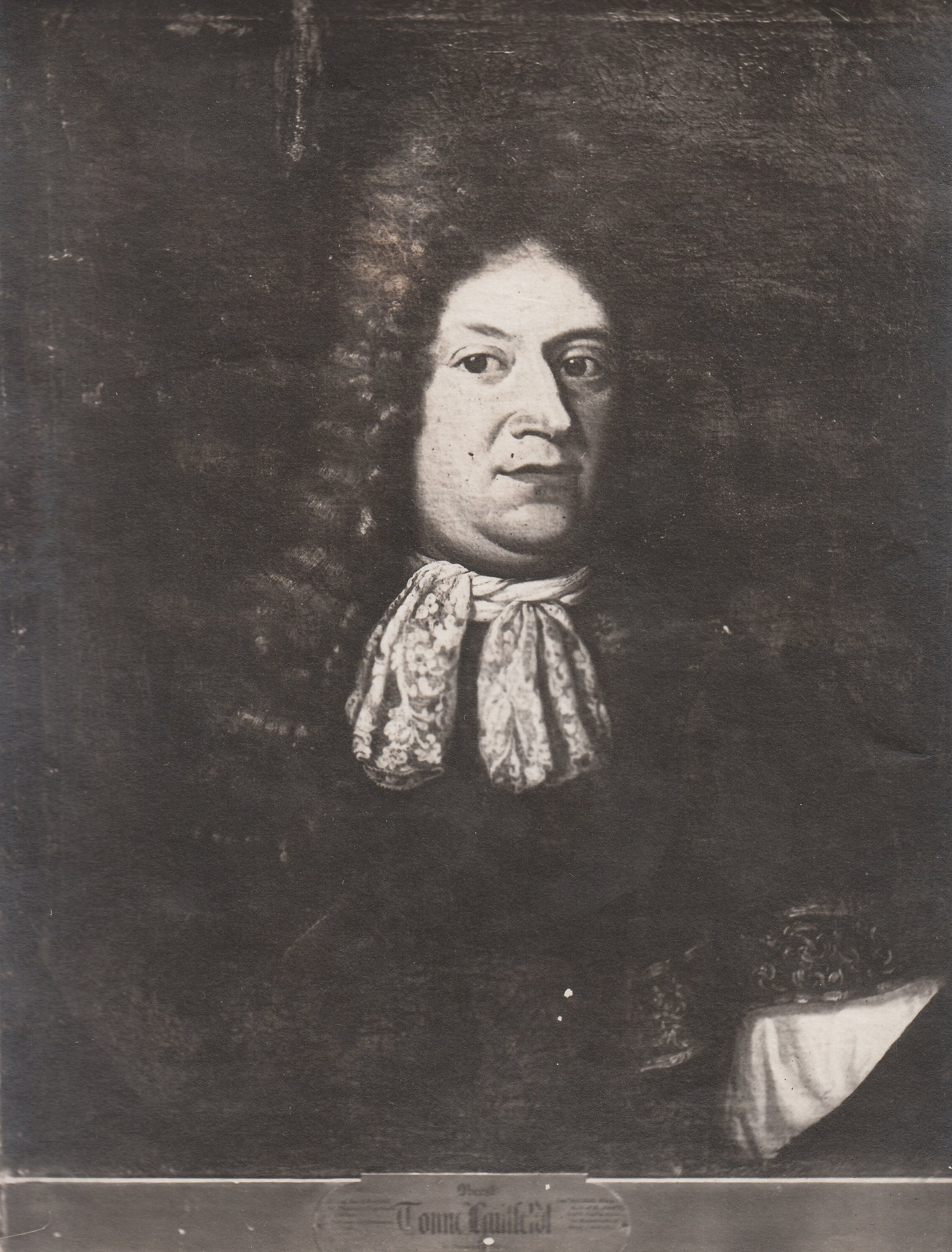
Tønne Huitfeldt

- 9 August – Hans Rosing, bishop (died 1699).
- 20 November – Tønne Huitfeldt, landowner and military officer (died 1677).

=== Full date unknown ===
- Paul Peterson Paus, priest and poet (died 1682).
