= 1611 in Norway =

- Centuries: 16th; 17th; 18th; 19th
- Decades: 1590s; 1600s; 1610s; 1620s; 1630s
- See also: 1611 in Denmark; List of years in Norway

Events in the year 1611 in Norway.

== Incumbents ==
- Monarch: Christian IV.

== Events ==
- April - The Kalmar War starts.
- Summer - Swedish forces under Baltzar Bäck invades Jemtland and Herjedalen.

== Births ==
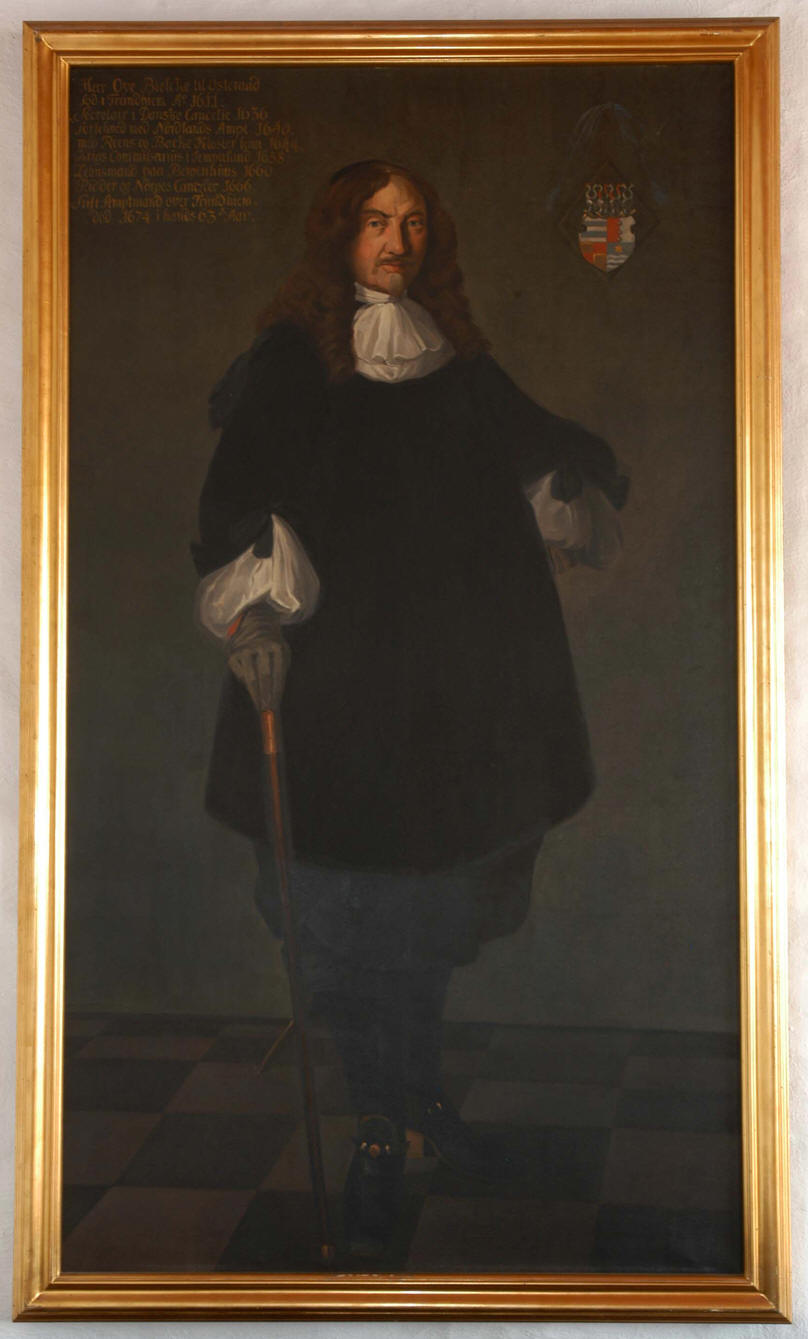
Ove Bjelke

- 26 October - Ove Bjelke, Chancellor of Norway (died 1674).
