= 1613 in Norway =

- Centuries: 16th; 17th; 18th; 19th
- Decades: 1590s; 1600s; 1610s; 1620s; 1630s
- See also: 1613 in Denmark; List of years in Norway

Events in the year 1613 in Norway.

== Incumbents ==
- Monarch: Christian IV.

== Events ==
- 20 January - The Kalmar War ends.
- 2 August - The Gjerpen Trial begins.
- 21 August - The Gjerpen Trial ends. Several priests and two students were found guilty of secretly support Catholicism. They were convicted to loss of benefice and inheritance, and were instructed to leave the country. One of the convicted was Christoffer Hjort.

== Arts and literature ==
- Harkmark Church was built.
