= Årøya =

Island in Finnmark, Norway

Årøya (Norwegian); Ladnesuolu (Northern Sami)
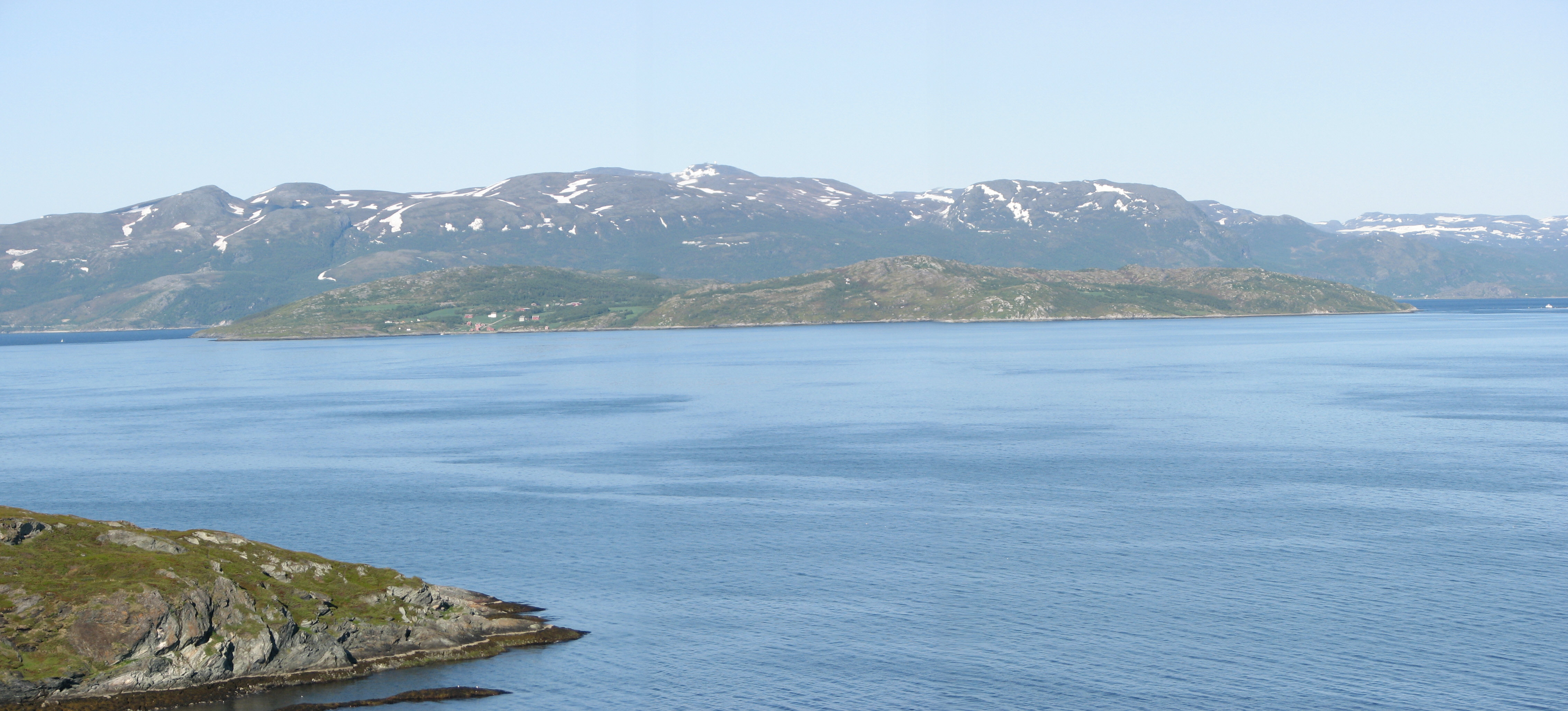
- Interactive map of: Årøya (Norwegian); Ladnesuolu (Northern Sami)

Geography
- Location: Finnmark, Norway
- Coordinates: 70.14152°N 23.20806°E

Administration
- Norway
- County: Finnmark
- Municipality: Alta Municipality

Årøya (Norwegian) or Ladnesuolu (Northern Sami) is an island in Alta Municipality in Finnmark county, Norway. The 6.38-square-kilometre (2.46 sq mi) island is located in the Altafjorden, about 22 kilometres (14 mi) north of the town of Alta. The island is only accessible by boat. There is a regular ferry connection between the village of Kongshus on Årøya and Mikkelsby on the mainland, just northwest of the village of Leirbotn.

The island is the site of the remains of the old Altenhus Fortress in the village of Kongshus. The old fortress was built in 1610.

== See also ==
- List of islands of Norway
