= Akershus witch trials =

1624 witch trial

Akershus witch trials was a witch trial which took place at the Akershus Fortress in Oslo in Norway in 1624.

Between 17 and 20 August 1624, the entire city of Oslo burnt down so seriously that it was rebuilt in a different place then where it had previously been situated. This was a time period in which a severe witch hunt was taking place in Denmark-Norway because of a new witchcraft law which had been introduced in 1617, and it is noted that more witchcraft cases were taking place in South East Norway in the period of 1619-1625 than any other period. During the autumn, five women were arrested and accused of having caused the city fire by use of witchcraft. Two of the women were freed, while three were executed by decapitation.
