= HMS Plover (M26) =

British naval vessel

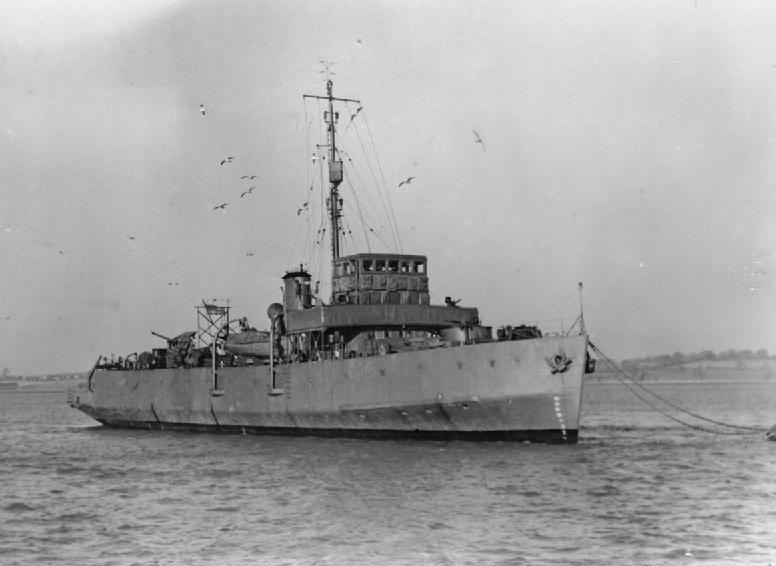
- Plover during World War II

History

United Kingdom
- Name: HMS Plover
- Ordered: 21 July 1936
- Builder: William Denny and Brothers, Dumbarton
- Laid down: 7 October 1931
- Launched: 8 June 1937
- Commissioned: 25 September 1937
- Fate: Sold for scrap, 1969
- Notes: Pennant number: M26

Class overview
- Operators: Royal Navy
- Preceded by: Adventure-class
- Succeeded by: Linnet-class
- Built: 1936–1937
- In service: 1937–1969
- Planned: 1
- Completed: 1
- Scrapped: 1

General characteristics as built
- Class & type: Coastal minelayer
- Displacement: 805 long tons (818 t) (standard); 1,020 long tons (1,036 t) (deep)
- Length: 195 ft (59.4 m) o/a
- Beam: 33 ft 9 in (10.3 m)
- Draught: 10 ft (3.0 m)
- Installed power: 1,400 ihp (1,000 kW); 2 × water-tube boilers
- Propulsion: 2 × shafts, 2 × vertical triple-expansion steam engines
- Speed: 14.75 knots (27.32 km/h; 16.97 mph)
- Complement: 69
- Armament: 2 × 0.303 in (7.7 mm) machine guns; 80–100 × mines

HMS Plover was a coastal minelayer built for the Royal Navy in the mid-1930s. She laid over 15,000 mines during World War II and remained on active duty until she was sold for scrap in 1969.

== Description ==
Plover displaced 805 long tons (818 t) at standard load and 1,020 long tons (1,036 t) at deep load. The ship had an overall length of 195 feet (59.4 m), a beam of 33 feet 9 inches (10.3 m) and a draught of 10 feet (3.0 m). She was powered by two vertical triple-expansion steam engines, driving two shafts, which developed a total of 1,400 indicated horsepower (1,000 kW) and gave a maximum speed of 14.75 knots (27.32 km/h; 16.97 mph). Steam for the engines was provided by two water-tube boilers. Plover carried a maximum of 116 long tons (118 t) of fuel oil. The ship's complement was 69 officers and men.

The ship initially mounted two 0.303 in (7.7 mm) machine guns, but after war broke out a single 12-pounder (3 in (76.2 mm)) gun was added aft as well as a 20-millimetre (0.8 in) Oerlikon autocannon forward. Plover was initially fitted with mine recovery gear, but her mine capacity increased from 80 to 100 after it was removed when World War II began. Sometime during the war she received a Type 286 air warning radar.

== Career ==
HMS Plover was accepted by the Royal Navy on 25 September 1937 and was commissioned on the same day. She was intended to conduct mining trials and was therefore fitted to recover as well as lay mines. During World War II she laid a total of 15,327 mines, including two that sank the German destroyer Z8 Bruno Heinemann off the Belgian coast in January 1942.

Near the end of the war, the German submarine U-325 struck a mine that was part of a minefield laid by Plover on the morning of 30 April 1945, 17 kilometres (11 mi) south of Lizard Point and consisted of 100 Mk XVII/XVII(8) mines.

The ship was kept in service after the war and took part in the Fleet Review to celebrate the Coronation of Queen Elizabeth II in 1953. She was sold to Thos. W. Ward in 1969. Plover arrived at their yard in Inverkeithing, Scotland, in April 1969 to begin scrapping.
