= Johanne Pedersdatter =

Norwegian woman accused of witchcraft

Johanne Pedersdatter (c. 1583 – 1622) was a Norwegian merchant's wife who was executed for witchcraft in Stavanger in Norway. She belonged to the more known victims of the witch hunt in Stavanger, where many such trials took place.

She was married to the burgher merchant Simon Jacobsen in Stavanger. She was known as an argumentative person, and was involved in conflict with a number of people. In 1617, a new witchcraft law was introduced in Denmark-Norway, which caused a witch hunt in both Denmark and Norway. Karin Nilsdatter reported her for having caused the illness and death of a vicar's wife. When she was put on trial, a number of witnesses testified that they or others had become ill after a conflict with her. She was tortured to confess her guilt. She was judged guilty and executed by burning.

Johanne Pedersdatter was the paternal grandmother of Carl von Linné through her son Jørgen Simonsen (1612-1692).
