= Altenhus Fortress =

Fortification in Norway

- Altenhus festning
- Årøya, Finnmark, Norway

Site information
- Type: Two-storey cross-shaped blockhouse with ramparts and a palisade
- Controlled by: Denmark–Norway

Location
- Coordinates: 63°00′25″N 7°15′10″E

Site history
- Built: 1610–11
- In use: 1611–13 (as a fortress); 1613–c. early 1690s (as a prison)
- Materials: Timber and earthworks
- Fate: Blockhouse dismantled, remains of earth ramparts still visible
- Events: Kalmar War (1611–13)

Garrison information
- Past commanders: Thomas Køningham
- Garrison: Commander and unknown number of soldiers, an armed galley, two horses

Altenhus Fortress (Norwegian: Altenhus festning; also Kongshus Fortress) was a fortification built on the island of Årøya in Finnmark county in Norway in 1610. The area is part of the present-day Alta Municipality.

Altenhus Fortress was intended to prevent Swedish incursions into the area, and secure the rich salmon fisheries for the Dano-Norwegian state. The structure only remained in military use for three years, before being abandoned and used as a prison until 1692, when the timber of the fortress' blockhouse was used in the construction of a church.

== Background ==
Due to the ongoing struggles between Denmark–Norway and the Swedish Empire in the early 1600s, the Dano-Norwegian king, Christian IV wanted to secure the western areas of the border-less far northern region of Finnmark against Swedish incursions. By building a fortress on the island of Årøya in the Altafjord, the rich salmon fisheries of the Alta River could also be protected. Christian IV had a strong interest in the Finnmark region, having personally led a naval expedition along the coast of Norway, as far as the then-disputed Kola Peninsula in present-day Russia. The king had also ordered the refurbishment of the old Vardøhus Fortress in eastern Finnmark.

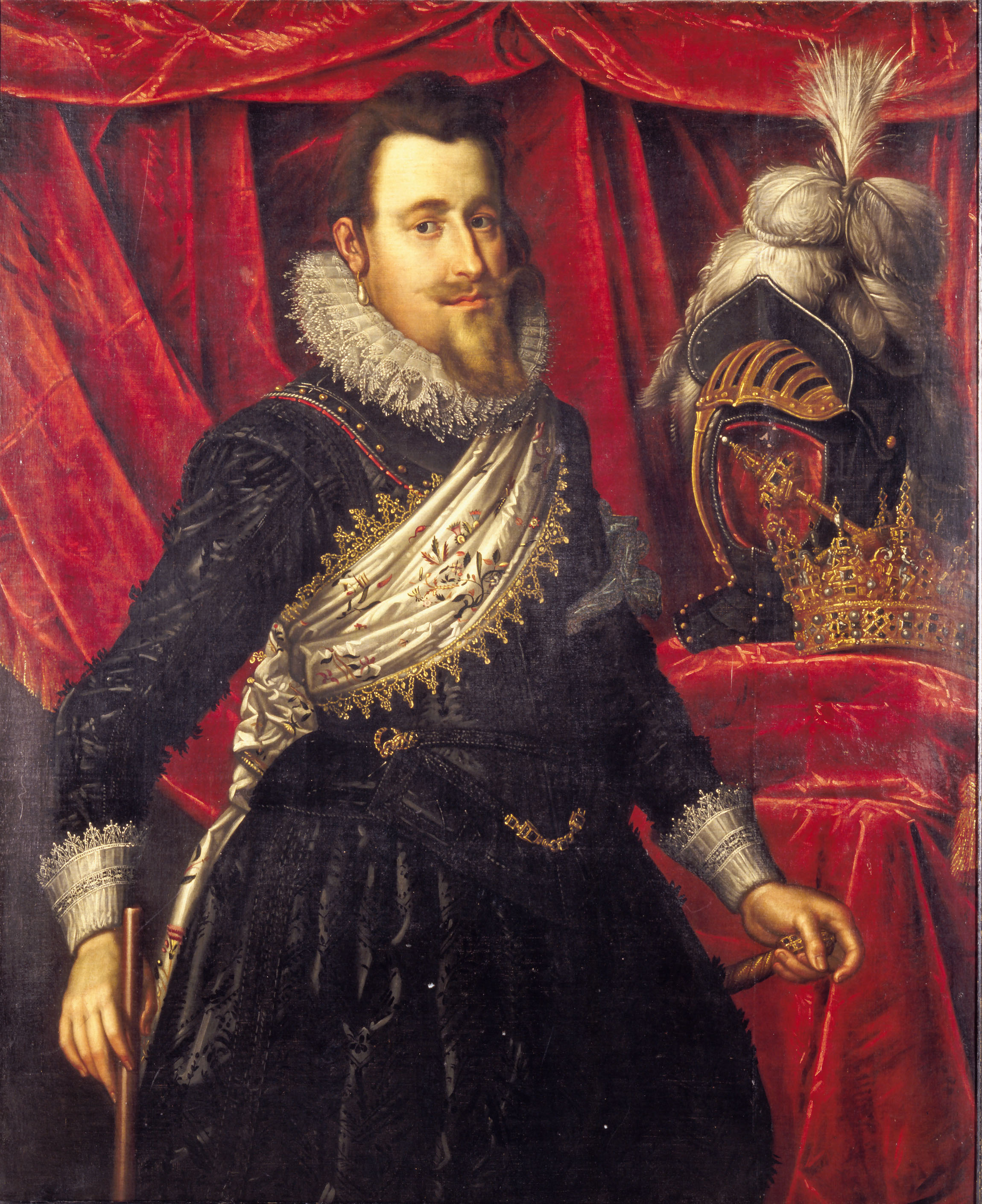
Christian IV of Denmark–Norway ordered the construction of Altenhus Fortress

By 1610, officials representing the Dano-Norwegian and Swedish empires had struggled for several years over who would tax the indigenous Sami people living in the Alta River area of Finnmark, and who would control the rich salmon fisheries of the Alta River. The Dano-Norwegian governor of Finnmark had had built in the 1560s a Goahti (earthen hut) near the river to house one of his bailiffs during the salmon season. From 1605 onwards Charles IX of Sweden laid claim on equal taxation rights on the salmon fisheries in the Alta River as that of the Dano-Norwegian king, and from 1606 competing Dano-Norwegian and Swedish tax collectors demanded taxes and, in the case of the Swedes, labour from the Samis fishing in the river. The conflict came to a violent confrontation in 1607, the Swedes being driven away by Norwegian fishermen. Further Swedish attempts at gaining a foothold near the river lead to further clashes in 1609, and in 1610 the Swedes made an unsuccessful attempt at bringing troops to Alta, intending to build a fortification there.

In response to the repeated Swedish incursions on territory claimed by Denmark-Norway in the north of Norway, and in order to secure the salmon fisheries in the Alta River, King Christian IV on 17 August 1610 ordered Governor Claus Gagge to build a fortification near Alta River.

== Construction ==
During the 1609 clashes, the Norwegians had captured and dismantled a church built by the Swedes in Alta. The timber from the church, some 10 ells in length, was employed when the construction of Altenhus Fortress began in 1610. The completion of the construction of the fortification, at various times called both Kongshus and Altenhus Fortress, by 14 labourers began in early May 1611 and lasted until mid-August of that year. Carpenters and other construction workers had to be brought in from Helgeland further south in Norway, as none could be found in Finnmark.

The finished fortification was an enclosed two-storey cross-shaped blockhouse, with sides about 22–23 metres (72–75 ft) long. The blockhouse had loopholes for observation and defensive firing. Earthen ramparts surrounded the blockhouse on three sides, with the fourth, eastern, side covered by a wooden palisade facing the sea. The ramparts were some 2–3 metres (6.6–9.8 ft) high and 20–30 metres (66–98 ft) long. The construction of the fortress on Årøya, led to a comparatively considerable immigration of Norwegians to the area, many arriving as carpenters and soldiers.

== Service as a fortress ==
Altenhus Fortress on Årøya was located midway in the Altafjord, enabling the structure to control shipping in the fjord. The fortress could also prevent intrusions from a northerly or southerly direction. Swedish spies described the fortification as "hard to bypass". To further increase the Dano-Norwegian control of the Altafjord, a gun-armed galley was based at the fortress. The garrison manning Altenhus had two horses, which were probably the first horses in Alta. The garrison was commanded by a Thomas Køningham (surname alternatively spelled Coningham or Cunningham).

After the completion of the fortification, the Sami people in the area began calling the island on which Altenhus was located Latnesuolu, meaning "Fortress island". The Sami population of Årøya had by 1613 disappeared, possibly by being forcibly moved by the Dano-Norwegian authorities.

The fortress was abandoned after the end of the 1611–13 Kalmar War, when the Swedes abandoned their claims on the coastal areas between the Tysfjorden and Varanger Peninsula, leaving the Altenhus without a purpose as a fortification.

== Use as a prison ==
Following the abandonment of Altenhus as a fortress, the structure was employed as a prison. Arrested individuals were kept in the blockhouse until they could be brought before the ting at Hasvåg on the island of Sørøya. Despite the continued occasional use as a prison, the former fortress fell into decay and contained almost nothing in the way of furniture or goods.

Amongst the people imprisoned at Altenhus were two Sami men accused in 1624 of theft of silver. The two accused argued that they had only come into possession of stolen goods after they had killed another Sami, Sarfe Finn, who they claimed had been plotting a rebellion against the Dano-Norwegian authorities by planning to kill a number of notable Norwegians on Årøya, and at Hammerfest, Hasvåg and Sørvær. The accused were sentenced to death for theft.

During the decades that followed the abandonment of Altenhus as a fortress, it was at times debated what should be done with the structure. In 1690, the population of Talvik requested the use of the timber of the blockhouse at Altenhus for the construction of a church, so the local people would no longer have to travel to Hasvåg for church services. Permission was granted, and in 1692–1694, the timber of the fortress was employed in the building of a church on Årøya.

== Remains ==
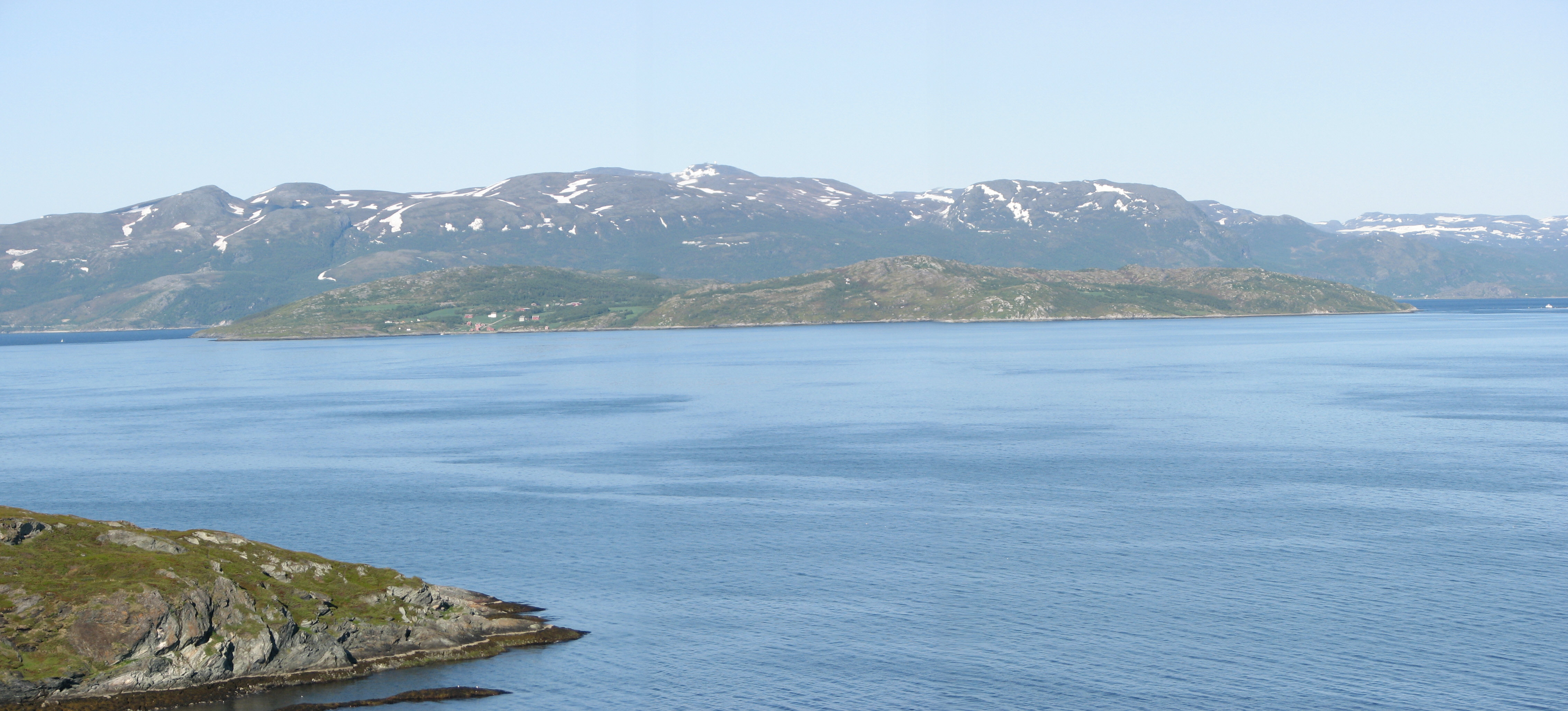
View of the island of Årøya from the west in 2011

As of the early 2000s, there are still visible remains of the fortress on Årøya. Of the blockhouse traces of both the foundation walls and the cellar remain. The ramparts from the fortress are the oldest existent remains relating to the Dano-Norwegian efforts at gaining control of Finnmark, and as such have been declared as protected by the Norwegian Directorate for Cultural Heritage.
