= Erik Anker Steen =

Norwegian naval officer and historian

Erik Anker Steen (21 June 1892 – 6 December 1972) was a Norwegian naval officer and historian.

He is best known for writing the seven-volume Norges sjøkrig ("Norway's Naval War"). The work first saw publicity in 1954, when Steen published volume two, Det tyske angrep i Oslofjorden og på Norges sørkyst. Volume one followed in the same year, then volume three in 1956, four in 1958 and five in 1959. Volume seven then came in 1960, volume 6a in 1963 and 6b in 1969. He served as an Orlogskaptein in the Royal Norwegian Navy, and worked in the Norwegian Armed Forces intelligence department prior to the Second World War.

He was also among the advisers for the Norwegian Labour Party when it in 1932 proposed to replace the entire armed forces with a semi-armed "civil guard".

Together with Gunvor Aslaug Ruud (1899–1981), Steen had the daughter Petra Fredrikke ("Bitle") Coldevin Anker Steen (1920–1988). In 1947 she married Ole Henrik Moe, a brother of Anne Stine Ingstad and brother-in-law of Helge Ingstad. Erik Anker Steen died in December 1972.
