= Naval battles of Narvik =

Naval battles during the German invasion of Norway

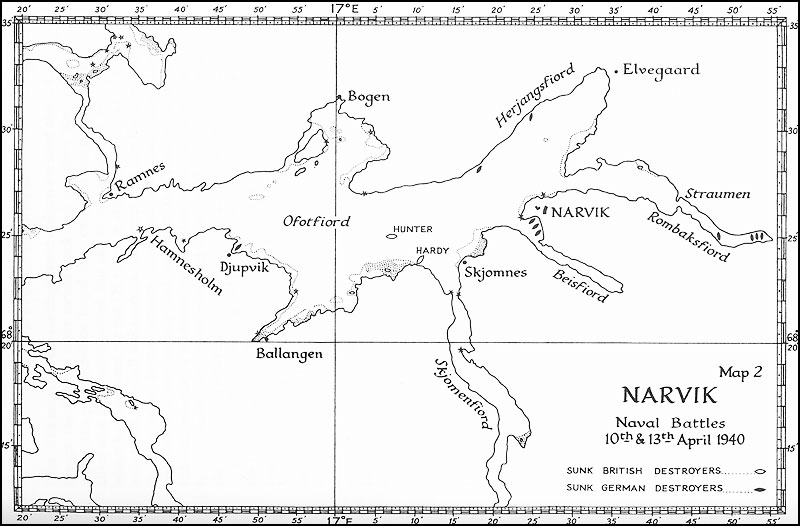
Map of the Narvik area showing the locations where British and German destroyers were sunk

The Naval Battles of Narvik were a series of naval engagements fought between German and Allied (Norwegian and British) forces in April 1940 during the German invasion of Norway as part of World War II. The battles took place in the Narvik and the waters of the surrounding fjords. The battles were initiated by the arrival of a German landing force transported to Narvik aboard 10 destroyers commanded by Commodore Friedrich Bonte, which sank Norwegian vessels and disembarked troops on 9 April. The First Battle of Narvik took place on 10 April 1940 and involved British destroyers under the command of Captain Bernard Warburton-Lee, resulting in losses on both sides. The German vessels, subsequently blocked in the fjord, were destroyed during the Second Battle of Narvik on 13 April 1940 by a British force that included the battleship HMS Warspite. These actions granted the Allies control of the waters around Narvik, which facilitated the subsequent capture of the city by Allied land forces in the Battle of Narvik, although they exerted no decisive influence on the overall outcome of the Norwegian campaign.

== Preparations ==
German landing at Narvik
- Part of World War II, Western Front, Norwegian campaign
| Date | 9 April 1940 |
| Location | Narvik |
| Result | German victory |

Belligerents
| Nazi Germany | Norway |

Commanders and leaders
| Friedrich Bonte | Per Askim |

Strength
| 10 destroyers | 2 coastal defence ships 3 patrol boats 2 submarines |

Casualties and losses
| None | 2 coastal defence ships sunk 3 patrol boats captured 276 killed |

On 1 March 1940, Adolf Hitler decided to carry out the invasion of Norway, codenamed Weserübung. The majority of German warships were allocated to this operation, tasked with transporting the first wave of the seaborne landing force. German forces were divided into six groups intended to seize Norway's main ports. One of the most important was the port of Narvik, which provided the most convenient route for transporting iron ore imported from the Swedish Kiruna mining district during winter, when the Baltic port of Luleå was frozen. It was the northernmost objective of the German landing in Norway. Due to its greatest distance from Germany, to achieve maximum surprise, it was decided to conduct the landing using fast and relatively heavily armed units, namely destroyers. The fact that Narvik lay deep in the Ofotfjord, at a distance of about 100 nautical miles from the open sea (including the Vestfjord), was also significant.

The force to capture Narvik was formed as Group I under the command of Commodore Friedrich Bonte, who held the position of Leader of Destroyers in the German fleet (Führer der Zerstörer). It consisted of 10 destroyers: Georg Thiele, Wolfgang Zenker, Bernd von Arnim, Erich Giese and Erich Koellner of Type 1934/34A, and Diether von Roeder, Hans Lüdemann, Hermann Künne, Wilhelm Heidkamp and Anton Schmitt of Type 1936. These were large and fast destroyers with a displacement exceeding 2,200 tons and a speed over 38 knots, heavily armed with five 128 mm guns (nominally 12.7 cm) and eight torpedo tubes each. The flagship was Wilhelm Heidkamp. The destroyers embarked as landing troops approximately 200 soldiers each from the 139th Mountain Rifle Regiment of the 3rd Mountain Division, along with a flamethrower platoon from the 83rd Mountain Engineer Battalion and an artillery company – a total of 1,854 soldiers under the command of Brigadier Eduard Dietl. (Note: Publications generally give a rounded figure of 2,000 soldiers (Perepeczko (1996, p. 29))) On 6 April 1940 at 11:00 PM, the group set sail from Wilhelmshaven. As part of Operation Hartmut, the destroyers near Narvik were to screen four submarines.

The destroyers initially sailed with units of Group II, which were to participate in the landing at Trondheim, including the heavy cruiser Admiral Hipper, and with the battleships Scharnhorst and Gneisenau providing cover for the operation. En route, however, some ships separated. The weather during the passage through the North Sea from the evening of 7 April was stormy, hindering navigation but also detection of the ships. The storm also caused greater fuel consumption by the destroyers.

Already on 7 April at 9:50 AM the ships were sighted by a British reconnaissance aircraft in the German Bight. The British reacted to reconnaissance reports of German ships sailing toward Norway; an air raid by 12 Blenheim bombers at 1:25 PM from No. 107 Squadron RAF was unsuccessful, however. At the same time, substantial fleet forces were sent to sea on the evening of 7 April to intercept the Germans, but these attempts proved ineffective. On 8 April at approximately 9:00 AM the British destroyer Glowworm alone detected in the Trondheim area two destroyers heading for Norway (Hans Lüdemann, and then Bernd von Arnim). After an ineffective exchange of fire the German destroyers broke contact with the enemy, but the heavy cruiser Admiral Hipper joined the fight. After a short duel Glowworm sank, but before that managed to damage Hipper by ramming it. A separate British force comprising destroyers and the battlecruiser Renown under Vice Admiral William Whitworth had maintained station off the Vestfjord entrance, where it deployed a minefield, but withdrew during the night of 8–9 April. Consequently, the German destroyers proceeded into the fjords unobserved. Navigation in the fjords was further assisted by the continued illumination of most coastal lighthouses, notwithstanding Norwegian directives issued that night to extinguish lights in southern regions in response to indications of imminent invasion.

== Landing in Narvik ==
On 9 April 1940, early in the morning, the German destroyers of Group I passed through Vestfjord and arrived at the entrance to Ofotfjord around 4:00 AM (times are given in German and Norwegian time; some sources use British time, one hour earlier). The weather was poor, with snowfall. At the entrance to Ofotfjord near Barøy island around 4:10 AM the Germans captured without resistance the Norwegian fishery protection patrol vessel Michael Sars (armed with two 47 mm guns) and the patrol boat Kelt (armed with a 76 mm gun). Kelt, however, transmitted a radio warning about the sighted ships. Hans Lüdemann and Anton Schmitt landed troops at Ramnes on the northern shore and Hamnesholm on the southern shore of the Ofotfjord entrance to neutralise reported coastal batteries, which proved incomplete and unmanned. They subsequently encountered the second fishery protection vessel Senja (47 mm gun), which was ordered to return to Narvik. Wolfgang Zenker, Erich Koellner, and Hermann Künne then proceeded into Herjangsfjord, the northern branch of Ofotfjord, to secure Bjerkvik and military depots at Elvegaardsmoen, disembarking troops there around 6:00 AM. Diether von Roeder remained on patrol at the Ofotfjord entrance near Barøy island. Erich Giese had earlier become separated in the storm due to suspected fuel tank leakage and rejoined the group later in Herjangsfjord.

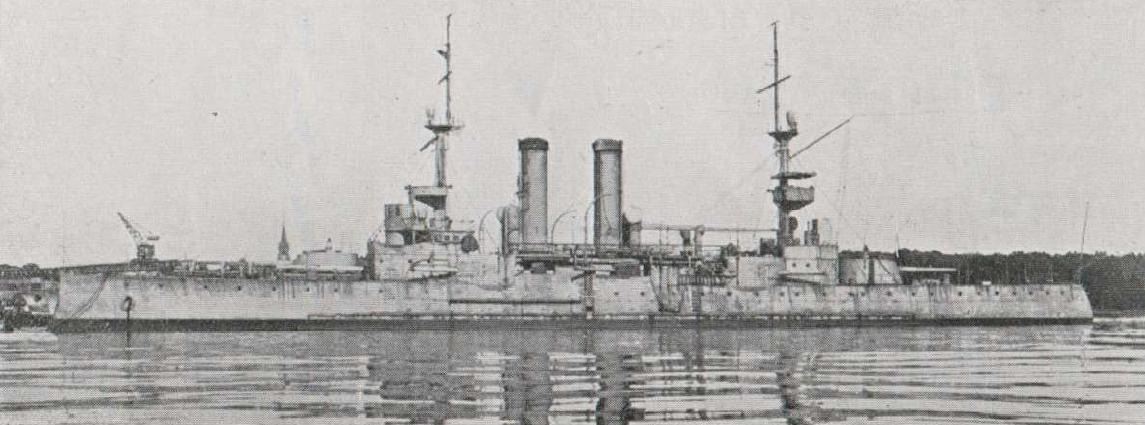
Coastal defence ship Norge

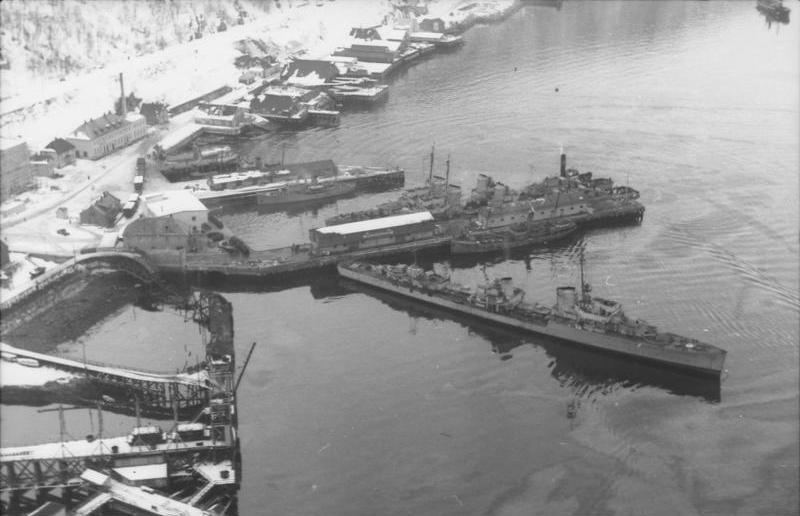
German destroyers in the port of Narvik (Diether von Roeder in the foreground), and between them captured Norwegian patrol boats (closest Kelt)

The three remaining destroyers (Wilhelm Heidkamp, Bernd von Arnim, and Georg Thiele) under Commodore Bonte proceeded toward Narvik harbour. In the absence of coastal artillery, the principal Norwegian defence comprised two old coastal defence ships of the Norge class, constructed at the turn of the century and equipped with heavy armour, two 209 mm guns, and six 149 mm guns each. At 5:10 AM, Bonte's group encountered the anchored Eidsvold (Captain Odd Willoch) outside the port, which fired a warning shot. The Norwegians had received alerts the previous day of possible German action; steam had been raised overnight on both battleships, and Eidsvold lay in the roadstead, though neither vessel was fully combat-ready and each was short approximately 40 crew members. Wilhelm Heidkamp halted and signalled intent to send a boat for parley. The German emissary, Lieutenant Commander Heinrich Gerlach, boarded Eidsvold and demanded surrender, asserting that German forces had come to protect Norway from British and French aggression. The other two destroyers meanwhile entered the harbour, a bay south of the town at the mouth of Beisfjord. After Captain Willoch consulted the Narvik naval commandant Per Askim (commander of Norge) and refused surrender, Gerlach returned to his boat. Upon clearing the battleship, he fired a signal rocket. Wilhelm Heidkamp then closed to 700 metres and launched a salvo of four torpedoes, two of which struck. The resulting detonation of the aft magazine caused Eidsvold to sink immediately at 5:37 AM, with the loss of 175 crew including the commander (only eight survivors were rescued, four by the delayed German boat).

Around 5:45 AM, the German ships began shelling the second Norwegian coastal defence battleship Norge (Captain Per Askim), the sister ship of Eidsvold, which had cast off from the shore and was moving at low speed across the port waters. Norge managed to fire four 209 mm shells and seven or eight 149 mm shells at Bernd von Arnim, which was already alongside the postal quay disembarking troops. (Note: According to other publications, five 21 cm shells and seven 15 cm shells (Patianin (2004, p. 22)).) The first salvo fell short, and the second hit the quay. Bernd von Arnim opened fire with its guns and launched seven torpedoes. The last two hit, and Norge sank with 101 sailors; 90 people were rescued, including the commander. After the loss of Norge, Norwegian resistance ceased. The destroyers then landed troops that occupied the city and five British and four Norwegian ships anchored in the port roadstead. In Narvik, there were also four neutral Swedish ships and one Dutch, as well as ten German ones, of which one – Bockenheim (4,902 GRT) – was grounded and burned by its own crew, who mistook the destroyers for British. All three Norwegian patrol boats were also captured in the port. Thanks to the pro-Nazi stance of the Narvik garrison commander, Colonel Konrad Sundlo, most Norwegian soldiers offered no resistance and were disarmed; only a part withdrew toward the Swedish border. Two old Norwegian submarines, B-1 and B-3, which on 8 April had moved from Narvik to Bogen Bay on the northern shore of Ofotfjord, failed to notice the German ships in poor visibility.

After disembarking the troops, the German destroyers remained in Narvik, as after the voyage from Germany they were running low on fuel supplies. The plan called for refuelling as quickly as possible and returning to Germany the same day. However, the Germans had only one tanker in Narvik, Jan Wellem (a former whaling ship base), which had arrived there for this purpose on 8 April, before the invasion, from the Soviet Murmansk. The second tanker, Kattegat, was delayed and was then intercepted on the evening of 9 April in Glomfjord (60 km south of Bodø) by the Norwegian fishery protection patrol boat Nordkapp, armed only with a 47 mm gun; after being shelled, it was scuttled by its crew. Refuelling was moreover time-consuming – 7–8 hours per destroyer, and only two could be serviced at a time. That day and night, fuel was replenished by Heidkamp, von Arnim, Thiele, Zenker and Koellner, while in the early morning Lüdemann and Künne were refuelling.

== First Battle of Narvik ==
First Battle of Narvik
- Part of World War II, Western Front, Norwegian campaign
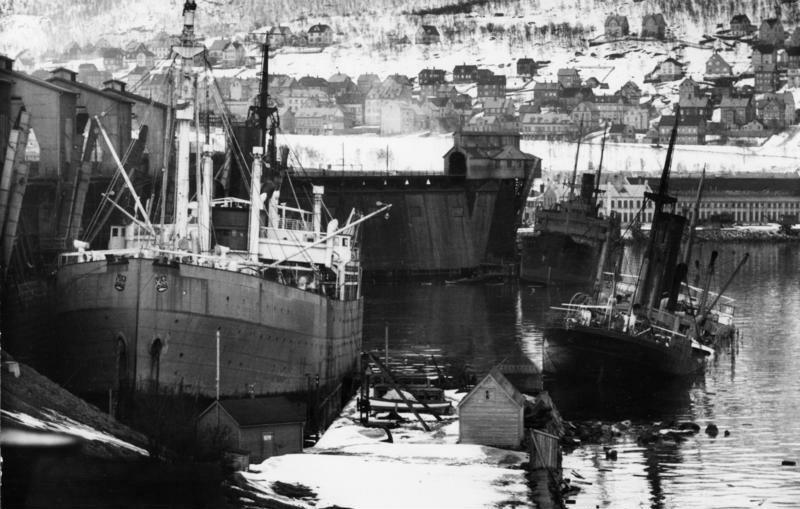
- Tanker Jan Wellem (left) and sunken ships in the port of Narvik
| Date | 10 April 1940 |
| Location | Narvik |
| Result | British victory |

Belligerents
| Germany | United Kingdom |

Commanders and leaders
| Friedrich Bonte † | Bernard Warburton-Lee † |

Strength
| 10 destroyers 3 submarines | 5 destroyers |

Casualties and losses
| 2 destroyers sunk, 1 heavily damaged, 4 lightly damaged 7 ships sunk 176 killed | 2 destroyers sunk, 1 moderately damaged 147 killed |

On the morning of 9 April, having no news of the capture of Narvik, the British sent the 2nd Destroyer Flotilla under Captain Bernard Warburton-Lee to the area of the entrance to Vestfjord. The flotilla consisted of five H-class destroyers: Hardy, Hotspur, Havock, Hunter, and Hostile. These were medium-sized destroyers, smaller than the German ships and slightly less heavily armed with four 4.7 in (120 mm) guns (except the larger flotilla leader Hardy which had five guns) and eight torpedo tubes each. The British Admiralty subsequently transmitted to them information that, according to press reports, one German ship had entered Narvik, and ordered its destruction or capture.

The British flotilla entered Vestfjord that day, where only from Norwegian pilots at the Tranøya station did they obtain incomplete information that six enemy destroyers and a submarine had already entered the fjord earlier. Between them the British ships had 21 120 mm guns and 40 torpedo tubes, while the Germans – according to the information – 30 128 mm guns and 48 torpedo tubes, and in reality 50 guns and 80 torpedo tubes. Faced with enemy superiority, the Admiralty left the decision whether to attack to the captain, after which Warburton-Lee informed the Admiralty of his decision to attack at dawn. (Note: The First Sea Lord message to Warburton-Lee said "‘You alone can judge whether, in these circumstances, attack should be made. We shall support whatever decision you take") The British force initially sailed back toward the exit from Vestfjord, thereby misleading the submarine U-51 patrolling in the fjord, which spotted the British at 8:22 PM but transmitted a message about their departure.

Around 9:00 PM, the British began sailing back into the depths of the fjord and after midnight on 10 April entered Ofotfjord, undetected due to the snowstorm by the patrolling submarines U-25 and U-46. A second favourable circumstance was that the destroyer Diether von Roeder patrolling in Ofotfjord turned back to port, considering that it was to patrol only until dawn, while the Hans Lüdemann which was intended to relieve it was still taking on fuel. Thanks to this, the British reached Narvik undetected, a dozen or so minutes behind Roeder. Visibility due to the snowstorm ranged from 100 to 1,000 m (110 to 1,090 yd). The destroyers Hostile and Hotspur were directed for a short reconnaissance to the north, toward the entrance to Herjangsfjord, to cover the remaining three and tie down any possible coastal batteries, which, however, did not exist.

At 5:35 AM, the three British destroyers Hardy, Hunter, and Havock entered the Narvik harbour roadstead in line-ahead formation and launched a surprise torpedo attack on the anchored German vessels, followed by gunfire. They discharged seven, eight, and five torpedoes respectively. Hardy fired three torpedoes and turned to leave at 20 knots, one torpedo hit a merchant ship, a second struck the flagship Wilhelm Heidkamp. The ensuing magazine detonation blew guns into the air, destroyed the stern, killing 81 or 83 crew members and officers perished, including Commodore Friedrich Bonte in his cabin. An attempt to moor the vessel alongside a nearby Swedish merchantman failed, and it capsized and sank the following day. As Hardy left it fired on a German destroyer and launched four more torpedoes but without effect. Hunter followed, over ten minutes firing eight torpedoes and opening fire on merchant ships before following Hardy out of the harbour producing smoke to give more cover to the retreat. Havock - 16 minutes behind Hardy - was last. Torpedoes hit two merchant ships and one hit Anton Schmitt. The explosion caused the engines of the nearby Hermann Kiinne to seize and it was fouled on Anton Schmitt's mast as it rolled over imobilising it for 40 minutes. Two torpedoes, attributed to either Havock or Hunter, had struck Anton Schmitt, which sank rapidly. (Note: According to some publications, the torpedo salvo from Hunter did not hit any destroyers (Perepeczko (1996, p. 31)), according to Patianin (2004, p. 22) it hit Anton Schmitt, while Kaczmarek (2009, p. 22) does not resolve the question of whose torpedoes they were.) Casualties aboard amounted to 52 (some sources report 63). The German force, caught entirely unprepared, initially raised an air-raid alarm. Subsequently, Diether von Roeder, Hans Lüdemann, and Hermann Künne returned fire with their main batteries, though with limited accuracy. Diether von Roeder, while dragging its anchors along the seabed, discharged a salvo of eight torpedoes; these ran too deep and passed harmlessly beneath the British ships, likely due to incorrect depth settings or technical faults. The British destroyers concentrated artillery fire on the German vessels. Diether von Roeder sustained heavy damage (five hits, resulting in 8 or 13 fatalities) and boiler room was on fire, while Hans Lüdemann received two hits (two killed) and developed fires aboard both ships. Hostile and Hotspur then joined the three British destroyers; the group circling at 30 knots outside the harbour firing into it. British gunfire or torpedoes also accounted for six anchored German merchant vessels, three captured Allied ships, and two Swedish vessels sunk, with several others damaged. Late in the engagement, Hans Lüdemann fired four ineffective torpedoes, one of which passed beneath Hostile.

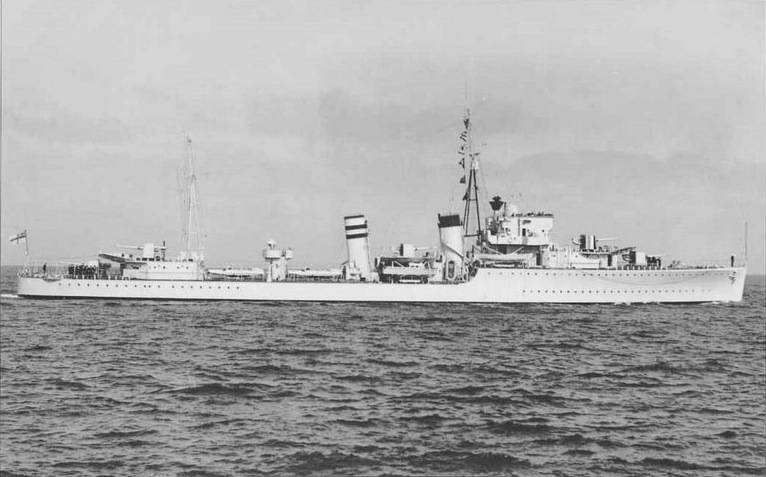
HMS Hardy before the war

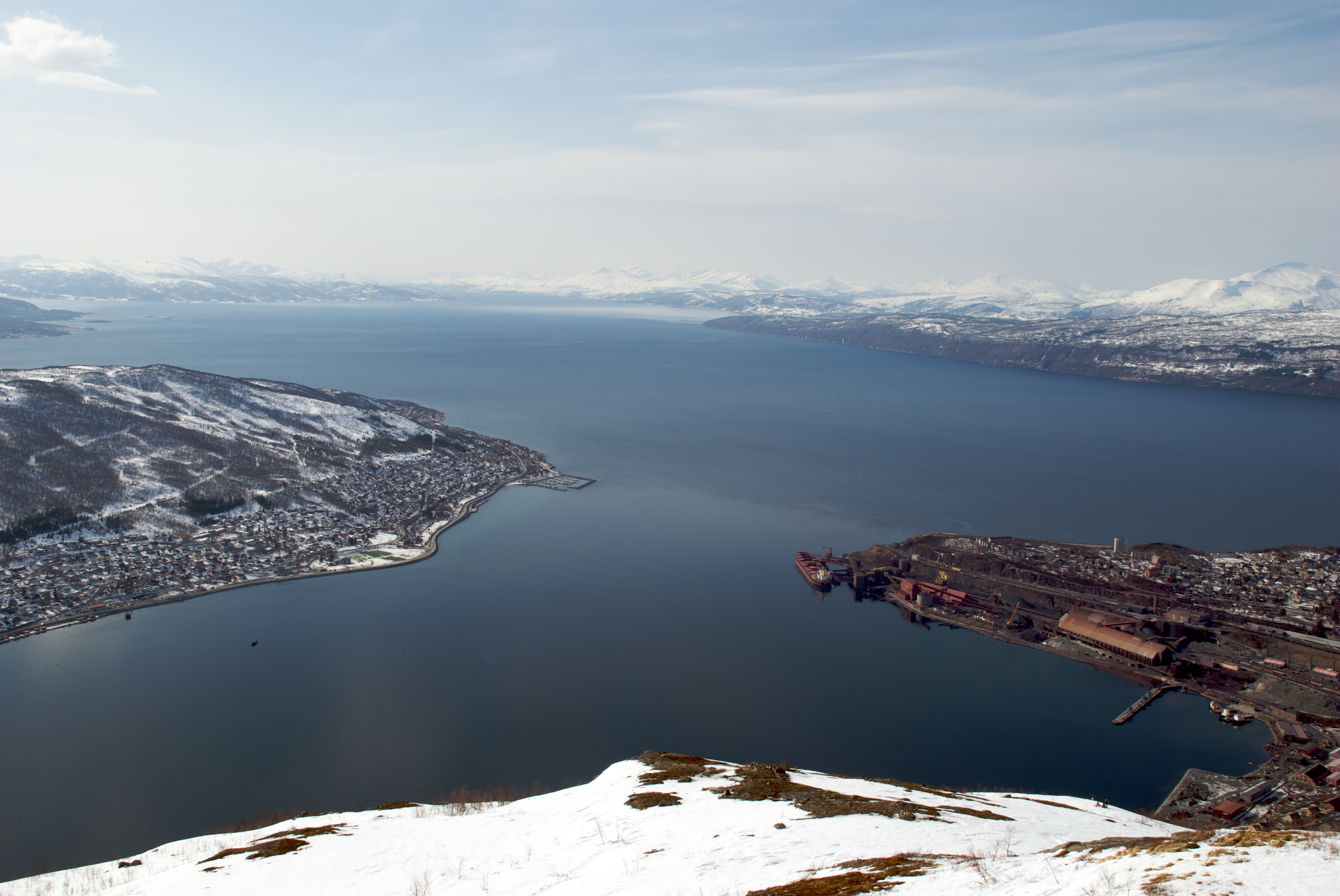
Contemporary view of the port of Narvik (right, partially obscured) and Ofotfjord (in the background). To the right is the entrance to Herjangsfjorden, to the left Ankenes

At 6:50 AM, the British flotilla commenced withdrawal from Narvik. At that juncture, three German destroyers stationed in Herjangsfjord – Wolfgang Zenker, Erich Koellner, and Erich Giese – emerged and engaged the retreating British ships. The initial exchanges - at around 7000 yds - produced no significant damage on either side. Believing one of the German ships to be a cruiser, Warburton-Lee signalled an emergency withdrawal at 30 knots and the destroyers also made smoke proceeding at high speed toward the Ofotfjord exit.

In response to a signal from the harbour, Bey believed they had been attacked by a far larger force and signalled to the remaining two German destroyers, Georg Thiele and Bernd von Arnim, to "break out to the west" ie leave and make for Germany. However Wolff had already responded to the earlier alarm and intended to give battle instead, entering the action from Ballangen Fjord to the south, crossing the British course from the port side. The British initially misidentified these vessels as friendly cruisers but quickly recognised the error and altered course to port to bring starboard batteries to bear on Thiele and Arnim. Around 7:00 am, the German destroyers delivered accurate close-range gunfire against the leading British destroyer Hardy, striking the bridge and wheelhouse and mortally wounding Captain Bernard Warburton-Lee. Stanning, the captain's secretary, aided by a seaman was able to adjust course and tried to ram the enemy before a boiler room was hit losing all power to the engines and Stanning turned Hardy to run ashore and save the crew. Continued hits reduced Hardy to a burning wreck; deprived of steering, it ran aground on the southern shore of the fjord near Vidrek, approximately 300 metres from land. Even as the crew abandoned ship under the direction of the First Lieutenant, the No. 4 gun continued to fire. Hotspur and Hunter also sustained damage, while on the German side Bernd von Arnim and Georg Thiele received hits – the latter, however, scoring a torpedo hit on Hunter. Torpedoes fired by both sides during the clash proved largely ineffective. Compounding British difficulties, the damaged Hotspur, having lost steering control, collided with the torpedoed Hunter ahead. Despite ongoing German fire, Hotspur succeeded in disengaging and withdrew using engine control alone. The immobilised Hunter subsequently sank, with the loss of 106 crew members (46 rescued). Havock and Hostile reversed course to support Hotspur, after which both sides disengaged. The three surviving British destroyers successfully exited the fjord. Survivors from Hardy reached the shore by swimming (19 killed in the action, most of the remainder wounded). Warburton-Lee was carried ashore but died of his wounds Together with crew members who had escaped from British merchant ships seized in Narvik, they were evacuated on 13 April by the destroyer Ivanhoe. Total casualties in the battle amounted to 147 British and 176 German sailors killed. (Note: Casualties in the First Battle of Narvik according to Perepeczko (1996, p. 33). Other figures are also found, such as 139 British and 174 German sailors killed (but without those who died later from wounds) in Kaczmarek (2009, p. 26) or 163 German in Patianin (2004, p. 23).)

Despite achieving numerical superiority, the German destroyers, now under the temporary command of Captain Erich Bey on Wolfgang Zenker, did not pursue the withdrawing British flotilla. Only Erich Koellner briefly followed the enemy, while Erich Giese remained constrained by low fuel reserves, although Zenker and Koellner had completed refuelling earlier. Undisturbed, the British ships proceeded toward the Ofotfjord entrance, where they intercepted the German supply ship Rauenfels (8,460 GRT), bound for Narvik with heavy equipment, field artillery, anti-aircraft guns, and ammunition. The U-25 had already fired on Rauenfels thinking it to be British but fortunately missed, Hotspur put two shells into it starting a fire and the crew abandoned ship. Havock sent a team aboard that found nothing of value, on returning Havock hit it with two more shells; a massive ammunition detonation followed. This loss prevented the German destroyers, already depleted to approximately half their shell stocks and most of their torpedoes, from replenishing munitions. The ship's captain and 18 crew members were taken prisoner aboard a British destroyer; the remainder were temporarily detained by Norwegian authorities.

To secure Vestfjord against the possible return of German destroyers, the Admiralty dispatched a force under Captain R. S. Yates, comprising the cruiser Penelope and 8 destroyers. On direct orders from Berlin, the only operationally ready German destroyers – Wolfgang Zenker and Erich Giese – attempted an evening breakout on 10 April under Bey's command. At approximately 10:05 PM, however, they sighted British vessels, including a cruiser, off Tranøy lighthouse and withdrew undetected. No further attempt was made to force a passage, despite the potential advantage the two destroyers might have enjoyed on the open sea. Contrary to the urgings of Winston Churchill, then First Lord of the Admiralty, the Admiralty delegated the decision to enter Ofotfjord and renew the attack to Captain Yates. He decided not to engage, deferring action until 12 April despite the persisting German vulnerability. On 11 April, however, Penelope sustained bottom damage on rocks near Bodø and was withdrawn for repairs. Provisional repairs were undertaken on the German destroyers over subsequent days, but on the night of 11 April Erich Koellner suffered severe hull damage on rocks, and Zenker damaged a propeller. On the evening of 12 April, a British air strike involving nine Swordfish torpedo bombers from the carrier Furious targeted Narvik but achieved limited results, sinking only three captured Norwegian patrol boats at the cost of two aircraft lost. Additionally, on 10 April, the destroyers Bedouin and Eskimo were attacked by the submarine U-25 in Vestfjord, though the torpedoes detonated prematurely.

== Second Battle of Narvik ==
Second Battle of Narvik
- Part of World War II, Western Front, Norwegian campaign
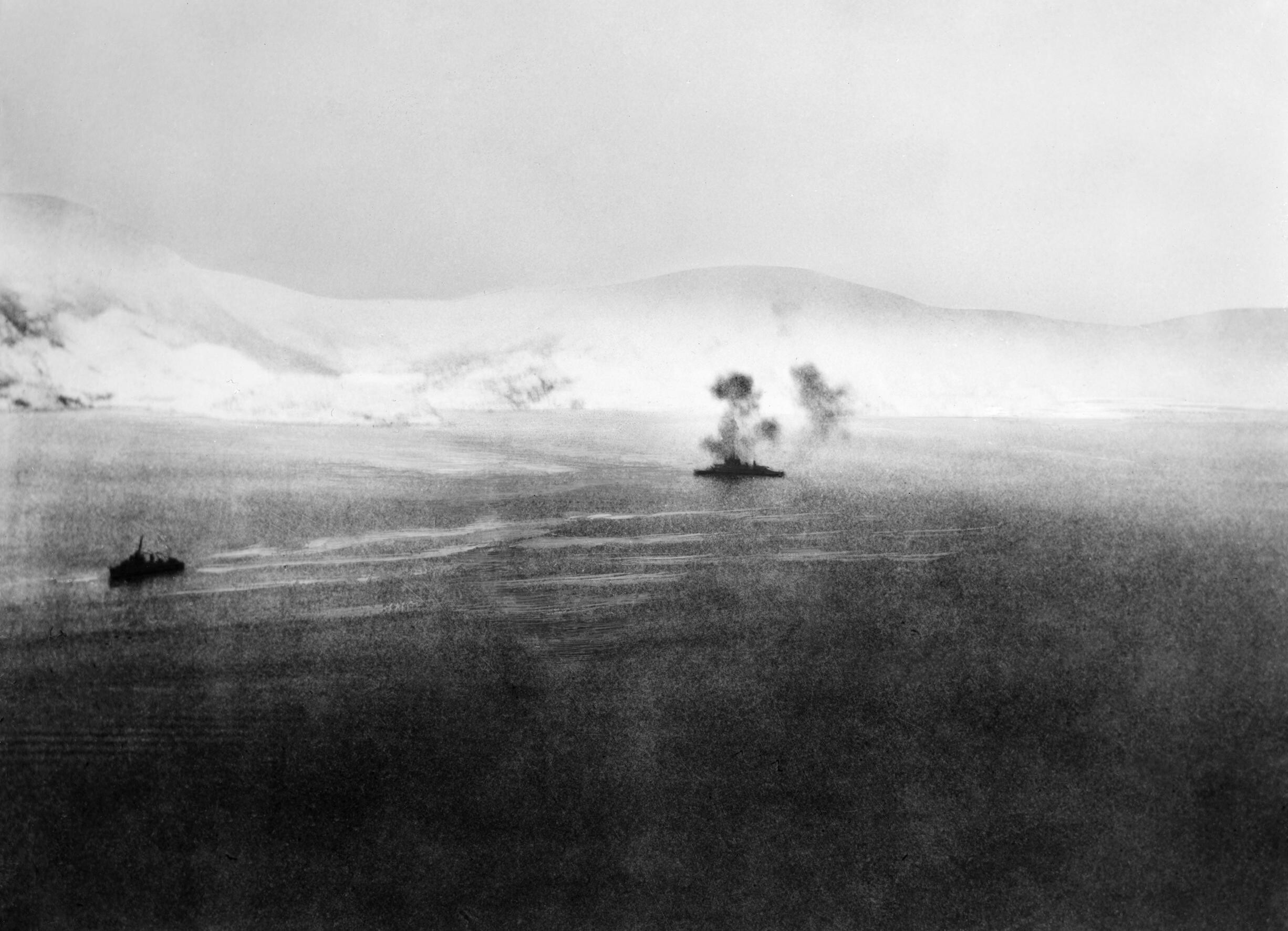
- HMS Warspite during the second engagement at Narvik
| Date | 13 April 1940 |
| Location | Narvik |
| Result | British victory |

Belligerents
| Germany | United Kingdom |

Commanders and leaders
| Erich Bey | William Whitworth |

Strength
| 8 destroyers 4 submarines | 1 battleship 9 destroyers |

Casualties and losses
| 4 destroyers sunk 4 destroyers scuttled 1 submarine sunk 128 killed | 1 destroyer heavily damaged 3 destroyers damaged 28 killed |

The Second Battle of Narvik took place on 13 April 1940. At approximately 12:30 PM, a powerful British squadron under Vice Admiral William Whitworth entered the fjord. It comprised the battleship Warspite escorted by 9 destroyers: Bedouin, Cossack, Punjabi, Eskimo, Kimberley, Hero, Icarus, Forester, and Foxhound. The first four were Tribal-class vessels armed with eight 120 mm guns; Kimberley was a J/K/N-class destroyer with six 120 mm guns; the remainder were medium-sized ships comparable to the earlier H-class. The primary offensive capability resided in Warspite, a World War I-era battleship that had undergone modernisation and carried eight 15 in (380 mm) guns. Introducing a battleship into the confined waters of a narrow fjord represented a bold and unconventional decision that entailed considerable risk but delivered overwhelming firepower. Cossack, Kimberley, and Forester advanced along the northern shore, while Bedouin, Punjabi, and Eskimo proceeded along the southern shore. The remaining destroyers screened the battleship. The force was preceded by a Fairey Swordfish seaplane launched from Warspite for reconnaissance.

Near the fjord entrance, the squadron was detected by the submarine U-46, which prepared a torpedo attack on the battleship. The submarine struck an underwater obstruction shortly before firing, forcing it to surface briefly, yet it managed to withdraw undetected. The British first sighted and engaged the destroyer Hermann Künne at 1:28 PM; the German vessel temporarily evaded under smoke screen. The squadron was instead attacked by Erich Koellner, which, hampered by prior damage and reduced speed, had been positioned for ambush on the northern shore but concealed itself in a cove on the southern side. Detected by the Swordfish, it quickly sustained a torpedo hit and multiple shell strikes from Bedouin, Punjabi, and Eskimo. The crew abandoned ship; one remaining gun continued firing and drew a salvo from Warspite, after which Erich Koellner sank. Casualties amounted to 31 killed and 39 wounded, with survivors taken into Norwegian custody. Its own torpedo salvo proved inaccurate. Subsequently, Wolfgang Zenker, Bernd von Arnim, and Hans Lüdemann sortied from Narvik into Ofotfjord, joined by Hermann Künne. In the widest section of the fjord, they engaged the British destroyers in a manoeuvring action. Poor visibility limited effectiveness on both sides, resulting only in moderate damage to Punjabi, which withdrew from the fight. The German vessels also faced an attack by ten Swordfish torpedo bombers from the carrier Furious, which proved ineffective and cost two aircraft. Wolfgang Zenker attempted a torpedo attack on Warspite, but the weapons ran errantly. Around 2:30 PM, Georg Thiele succeeded in exiting the harbour and reinforced the German force. With ammunition nearly exhausted, Captain Erich Bey ordered withdrawal into the narrow Rombaksfjord, only a few hundred metres wide, at approximately 2:50 PM. The commander of Hermann Künne, failing to observe the signal, instead entered Herjangsfjord intending to beach and scuttle his ship. At 3:13 PM, it was torpedoed by Eskimo; the destroyer broke in two and sank in shallow water (the cause – torpedo or self-destruction – remains uncertain).

In Narvik harbour, the immobilised Diether von Roeder and Erich Giese – the latter hampered by engine problems – remained. Around 3:00 PM these vessels engaged the approaching British destroyers in an artillery duel. Erich Giese eventually sortied from the harbour at approximately 3:05 PM but immediately came under concentrated fire from the battleship Warspite. After expending its ammunition and launching an inaccurate torpedo salvo, the repeatedly struck destroyer was abandoned by its crew and subsequently finished off by British vessels. Diether von Roeder, moored alongside the shore, inflicted serious damage on the entering destroyer Cossack with accurate gunfire. Cossack temporarily lost steering control and ran aground near Ankenes at 3:22 PM. It was refloated and withdrawn from the fjord only the following day, during which it endured shore-based artillery fire. The crew subsequently abandoned Diether von Roeder and scuttled it with demolition charges around 4:20 PM. The British had initially intended to board the vessel using Foxhound, but the latter came under machine-gun fire from the shore and withdrew, thereby avoiding the ensuing explosion.

Eskimo pursued the retreating Germans into the narrow Rombaksfjord. In its most constricted section, the destroyer encountered Georg Thiele and Hans Lüdemann positioned in ambush, which discharged a torpedo salvo. Most torpedoes missed (some sources indicate they were evaded despite the fjord's limited width), but at 3:45 PM one torpedo from Thiele struck Eskimo, severing the entire bow section forward of the bridge (15 killed). The vessel nevertheless remained afloat. The German destroyers then came under fire from Forester, Hero, and Bedouin. The damaged Georg Thiele ran aground around 4:00 PM, after which its hull fractured amidships. The remaining German destroyers withdrew to the head of Rombaksfjord, where they were scuttled. Wolfgang Zenker and Bernd von Arnim were destroyed by their crews and sank. The abandoned Hans Lüdemann initially remained afloat and was briefly secured by the British, who ultimately abandoned plans to salvage it due to extensive damage and sank it with a torpedo from Hero.

In Herjangsfjord, the submarine U-64 – which had entered the area on 11 April – was present. Early in the battle on 13 April, it was detected on the surface and sunk by depth charges from a Swordfish seaplane launched from Warspite. The submarine U-51, however, survived by remaining submerged.

== Outcome ==
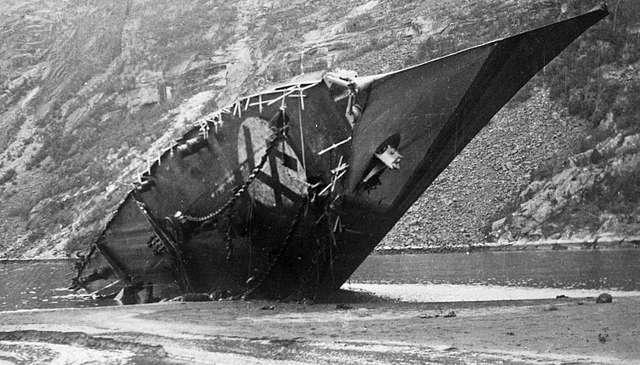
Sunken destroyer Bernd von Arnim

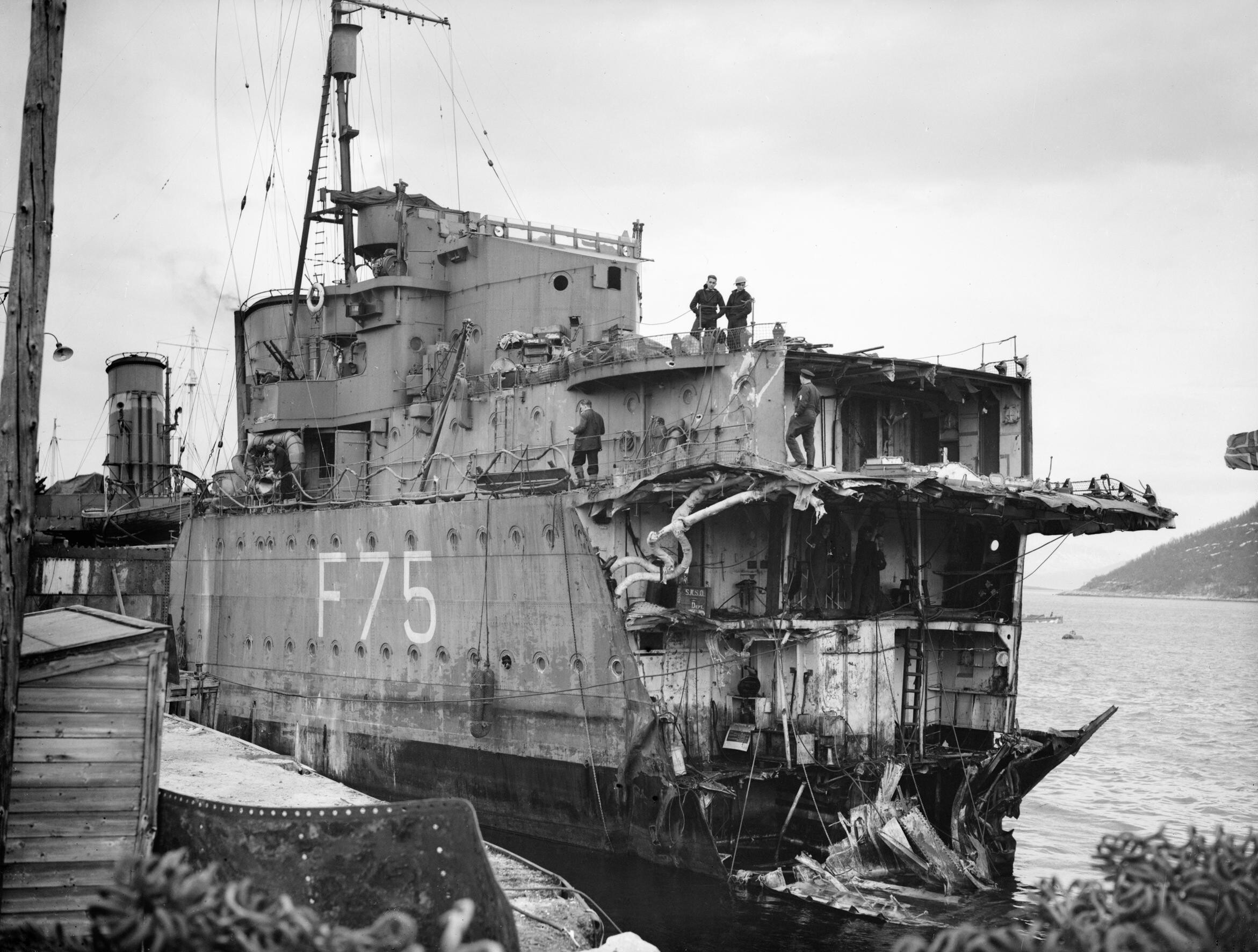
Eskimo with bow torn off

German casualties in the Second Battle of Narvik totalled 128 killed and 67 wounded. British losses were significantly lower, at 28 killed and 55 wounded. Survivors from the destroyed destroyers were organised into an improvised naval infantry regiment of approximately 2,100 men under the command of Lieutenant Commander Hans Erdmenger (former commander of Wilhelm Heidkamp). This formation subsequently participated in the ground defence of Narvik.

The initial seizure of Narvik on 9 April 1940, accompanied by the destruction of Norwegian vessels without German naval losses, constituted an operational success. This outcome was facilitated primarily by the use of destroyers as versatile platforms for troop transport. The engagement of 9 April demonstrated the vulnerability of late-19th-century coastal defence ships reliant on heavy artillery when confronted with contemporary torpedo armament. In the subsequent actions, however, the Germans lost all 10 destroyers assigned to the Narvik operation – a substantial setback, as these units represented half of Germany's destroyer strength at the commencement of hostilities and formed the most extensively employed class of major surface combatants throughout the war. British naval losses were restricted to two destroyers sunk, one severely damaged, and several others moderately damaged, alongside merchant shipping losses sustained by both sides. The principal, though indirect, factor contributing to the German defeat resided in the operational planning, which rendered prompt refuelling and withdrawal of the full flotilla on 9 April infeasible, even assuming the availability of both designated tankers. This exposed inherent limitations in German destroyer design, notably their comparatively short operational radius and restricted artillery ammunition capacity – deficiencies that became apparent in later campaigns. The consequent entrapment of the flotilla and its destruction reflected British dominance at sea. Potential opportunities to inflict heavy damage on Royal Navy forces through destroyer and submarine torpedoes in Vestfjord and Ofotfjord were largely negated by persistent technical deficiencies in German torpedoes during this period, including premature detonation of magnetic fuzes and excessive running depth.

The action of the British 2nd Destroyer Flotilla on 10 April exerted a significant influence on the subsequent course of events. Despite facing a numerically superior opponent, the flotilla inflicted substantial losses, disrupted German operations, and precluded any immediate attempt by the full destroyer group to break out that day. This success, however, was not capitalised upon through a follow-up attack on 10 or 11 April, allowing the Germans time to effect provisional repairs to their vessels. The Second Battle of Narvik on 13 April resulted in the elimination of all remaining German destroyers, thereby granting the Allies command of the surrounding waters. This facilitated amphibious landings and logistical support for ground forces in the vicinity. Nevertheless, Narvik itself and its immediate environs remained under German control, and the Allies lacked immediate readiness for a rapid recapture. The town was taken only after protracted fighting in the land Battle of Narvik in May 1940. Throughout this period, Allied naval forces patrolled the fjords around Narvik, particularly Rombaksfjord, and provided gunfire support to ground troops. The primary threat shifted to German air power operating from captured Norwegian bases. On 4 May 1940, Luftwaffe aircraft sank the Polish destroyer ORP Grom in Rombaksfjord, marking the final destroyer loss associated with the Narvik operations. Despite Allied successes at sea and the eventual recapture of Narvik on land, the German attack on France compelled the evacuation of Allied forces from northern Norway in June 1940, resulting in the overall failure of the Norwegian Campaign.

Among the participants, Captain Bernard Warburton-Lee was posthumously awarded the Victoria Cross, the highest British gallantry decoration; several other officers received additional high honours. On the German side, Commodore Friedrich Bonte (posthumously), Captain Erich Bey, and Lieutenant Commanders Friedrich Berger, Hans Erdmenger, and Max-Eckart Wolff (commander of Georg Thiele) were awarded the Knight's Cross of the Iron Cross on 15 May 1940. Captain Bey succeeded Bonte as Führer der Zerstörer.

== Order of battle ==
† – ships sunk
# – ships damaged (## – heavily)

=== Landing in Narvik ===
Nazi Germany:

- Group I – Commodore Friedrich Bonte
  - Flagship destroyer:
    - Wilhelm Heidkamp (flagship; Lieutenant Commander Hans Erdmenger)
  - 1st Destroyer Flotilla – Commander Friedrich Berger:
    - Georg Thiele (flagship; Lieutenant Commander Max-Eckart Wolff)
  - 3rd Destroyer Flotilla – Commander Hans-Joachim Gadow:
    - Hans Lüdemann (flagship; Lieutenant Commander Herbert Friedrichs),
    - Hermann Künne (Lieutenant Commander Friedrich Kothe),
    - Diether von Roeder (Lieutenant Commander Erich Holtorf),
    - Anton Schmitt (Lieutenant Commander Friedrich Böhme)
  - 4th Destroyer Flotilla – Commander Erich Bey:
    - Wolfgang Zenker (flagship; Commander Gottfried Pönitz),
    - Bernd von Arnim (Lieutenant Commander Curt Rechel),
    - Erich Giese (Lieutenant Commander Karl Smidt),
    - Erich Koellner (Commander Alfred Schulze-Hinrichs)
  - Landing force: 139th Mountain Rifle Regiment of 3rd Mountain Division, regimental staff, artillery company, flamethrower platoon (1,854 soldiers)
- 1st Submarine Group:
  - U-25, U-46, U-51

Norway:

- 1st Battleship Division (1. Pansarskipdivisjon) – Captain Per Askim:
  - coastal defence ship Norge † (Captain Per Askim)
  - coastal defence ship Eidsvold † (Captain Odd Isaachsen Willoch †)
- 3rd Submarine Division (3. Undervannsbåtdivisjon):
  - submarines: B-1, B-3
- fishery protection patrol vessels: Senja, Michael Sars
- patrol boat: Kelt

=== First Battle of Narvik ===
Nazi Germany:

- Group I – Commodore Friedrich Bonte †
  - Flagship destroyer:
    - Wilhelm Heidkamp † (Commodore Bonte's flagship)
  - 1st Destroyer Flotilla – Commander Friedrich Berger:
    - Georg Thiele #
  - 3rd Destroyer Flotilla – Commander Hans-Joachim Gadow:
    - Hans Lüdemann # (flagship), Hermann Künne #, Diether von Roeder ##, Anton Schmitt †
  - 4th Destroyer Flotilla – Commander Erich Bey:
    - Wolfgang Zenker (flagship), Bernd von Arnim #, Erich Giese, Erich Koellner
- 1st Submarine Group:
  - U-25, U-46, U-51

United Kingdom:

- 2nd Destroyer Flotilla – Captain Bernard Warburton-Lee † (H-class destroyers):
  - Hardy † (flagship, Captain B. Warburton-Lee †)
  - Hunter † (Lieutenant Commander Lindsay de Villiers †)
  - Hotspur # (Commander Herbert Layman)
  - Havock (Lieutenant Commander Rafe Courage)
  - Hostile (Commander John Wright)

=== Second Battle of Narvik ===
Nazi Germany:

- Group I – Commander Erich Bey:
  - 1st Destroyer Flotilla – Commander F. Berger
    - Georg Thiele †
  - 3rd Destroyer Flotilla – Commander Hans-Joachim Gadow:
    - Hans Lüdemann † (flotilla flagship), Hermann Künne †, Diether von Roeder †
  - 4th Destroyer Flotilla – Commander Erich Bey:
    - Wolfgang Zenker † (Commander Bey's flagship), Bernd von Arnim †, Erich Giese †, Erich Koellner †
- 1st Submarine Group:
  - U-25, U-46, U-51, U-64†

United Kingdom:

- Striking force – Vice Admiral William Whitworth:
  - battleship Warspite (Vice Admiral Whitworth's flagship, commander Captain V.A.C. Crutchley)
  - destroyers:
    - Bedouin (Commander James McCoy), Punjabi #, Eskimo ## (Commander St. John Micklethwait), Cossack ## (Commander Robert St. Vincent Sherbrooke), Hero, Forester, Foxhound, Kimberley, Icarus
- Cover:
  - destroyers Esk, Ivanhoe, Hostile, Havock

== Bibliography ==
- Dickens, Peter (1974). Narvik: Battles in the Fjords. Naval Institute Press.
- Perepeczko, Andrzej (1996). "Zagłada zespołu komodora Bonte" [Destruction of Commodore Bonte's Group]. Morza, Statki i Okręty (in Polish). 2. Warsaw: Magnum X. ISSN 1426-529X.
- Kaczmarek, Rafał M. (2009). "Pierwsza bitwa niszczycieli. Narwik 1940" [First Battle of Destroyers. Narvik 1940]. Morze, Statki i Okręty (in Polish). 2. Warsaw: Magnum X. ISSN 1426-529X.
- Patianin, Siergiej (2004). Esmincy tipa Leberecht Maass [Destroyers of the Leberecht Maass Type]. Morskaja Kollekcyja (in Russian).
