= German destroyer Z11 Bernd von Arnim =

Type 1934A-class destroyer

Coordinates: 68°25′N 17°54′E

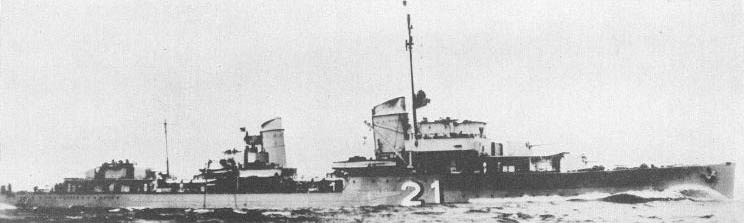
- Sister ship Z5 Paul Jacobi, c. 1938

History

Nazi Germany
- Name: Z11 Bernd von Arnim
- Namesake: Bernd von Arnim
- Ordered: 9 January 1935
- Builder: Germania, Kiel
- Yard number: G537
- Laid down: 26 April 1935
- Launched: 8 July 1936
- Completed: 6 December 1938
- Fate: Scuttled, 13 April 1940

General characteristics (as built)
- Class & type: Type 1934A-class destroyer
- Displacement: 2,171 long tons (2,206 t) (standard); 3,190 long tons (3,240 t) (deep load)
- Length: 119 m (390 ft 5 in) o/a; 114 m (374 ft 0 in) w/l
- Beam: 11.30 m (37 ft 1 in)
- Draft: 4.23 m (13 ft 11 in)
- Installed power: 6 × water-tube boilers; 70,000 PS (51,000 kW; 69,000 shp)
- Propulsion: 2 shafts, 2 × geared steam turbines
- Speed: 36 knots (67 km/h; 41 mph)
- Range: 1,530 nmi (2,830 km; 1,760 mi) at 19 knots (35 km/h; 22 mph)
- Complement: 325
- Armament: 5 × single 12.8 cm (5 in) guns; 2 × twin 3.7 cm (1.5 in) AA guns; 6 × single 2 cm (0.8 in) AA guns; 2 × quadruple 53.3 cm (21 in) torpedo tubes; 60 × mines; 4 × depth charge throwers and 6 × individual racks for 32–64 depth charges

Z11 Bernd von Arnim was a Type 1934A-class destroyer built for Nazi Germany's Kriegsmarine in the late 1930s. At the beginning of World War II, the ship was initially deployed to blockade the Polish coast, but she was quickly transferred to the German Bight to lay minefields in German waters. In late 1939 the ship made one successful minelaying sortie off the English coast that claimed one British warship and seven merchant ships. During the early stages of the Norwegian Campaign, Bernd von Arnim fought the British destroyer Glowworm while transporting troops to the Narvik area in early April 1940, but neither ship was damaged during the action. The ship fought in both naval Battles of Narvik several days later and had to be scuttled after she exhausted her ammunition.

== Design and description ==
Bernd von Arnim had an overall length of 119 meters (390 ft 5 in) and was 114 meters (374 ft 0 in) long at the waterline. The ship had a beam of 11.30 meters (37 ft 1 in), and a maximum draft of 4.23 meters (13 ft 11 in). She displaced 2,171 long tons (2,206 t) at standard load and 3,190 long tons (3,240 t) at deep load. The Wagner geared steam turbines were designed to produce 70,000 metric horsepower (51,000 kW; 69,000 shp) which would propel the ship at 36 knots (67 km/h; 41 mph). Steam was provided to the turbines by six high-pressure Benson boilers with superheaters. Bernd von Arnim carried a maximum of 752 metric tons (740 long tons) of fuel oil which was intended to give a range of 4,400 nautical miles (8,100 km; 5,100 mi) at 19 knots (35 km/h; 22 mph), but the ship proved top-heavy in service and 30% of the fuel had to be retained as ballast low in the ship. The effective range proved to be only 1,530 nmi (2,830 km; 1,760 mi) at 19 knots (35 km/h; 22 mph).

Bernd von Arnim carried five 12.7 cm SK C/34 guns in single mounts with gun shields, two each superimposed, fore and aft. The fifth gun was carried on top of the rear deckhouse. Her anti-aircraft armament consisted of four 3.7 cm SK C/30 guns in two twin mounts abreast the rear funnel and six 2 cm C/30 guns in single mounts. The ship carried eight above-water 53.3-centimeter (21.0 in) torpedo tubes in two power-operated mounts. A pair of reload torpedoes were provided for each mount. Four depth charge throwers were mounted on the sides of the rear deckhouse and they were supplemented by six racks for individual depth charges on the sides of the stern. Enough depth charges were carried for either two or four patterns of 16 charges each. Mine rails could be fitted on the rear deck that had a maximum capacity of 60 mines. 'GHG' (Gruppenhorchgerät) passive hydrophones were fitted to detect submarines.

== Career ==
The ship was ordered on 4 August 1934 and laid down at Germania, Kiel on 26 March 1935 as yard number G537. She was launched on 8 July 1936 and completed on 6 July 1938. When World War II began in September 1939, Bernd von Arnim was initially deployed in the Baltic to operate against the Polish Navy and to enforce a blockade of Poland, but she was soon transferred to the German Bight where she joined her sisters in laying defensive minefields. The ship also patrolled the Skagerrak to inspect neutral shipping for contraband goods. Bernd von Arnim joined the other destroyers in laying minefields off the British coast in November, when Bernd von Arnim, Hermann Künne and Wilhelm Heidkamp laid about 180 magnetic mines in the middle of the Thames Estuary on the night of 17/18 November. The destroyer HMS Gipsy, one trawler, and seven other ships totalling 27,565 Gross Register Tons (GRT) were sunk by this minefield. Four days later, she was one of the destroyers escorting the battleships Gneisenau and Scharnhorst through the North Sea to break out into the North Atlantic. Together with her sisters Hans Lody and Erich Giese, Bernd von Arnim was to lay a minefield off Cromer during the night of 6/7 December, but she had trouble with two of her boilers and had to shut them down. The ship was ordered to return to port while the other two destroyers continued their mission.

=== Norwegian campaign ===
Bernd von Arnim was allocated to Group 1 for the Norwegian portion of Operation Weserübung in April 1940. The group's task was to transport the 139th Mountain Infantry Regiment (139. Gebirgsjäger Regiment) and the headquarters of the 3rd Mountain Division (3. Gebirgs-Division) to seize Narvik. The ships began loading troops on 6 April and set sail the next day. Bernd von Arnim was spotted by the British destroyer Glowworm in a storm on the morning of 8 April and the ship turned away to the north-west at full speed after laying a smoke screen. The German ship was suffering damage from the heavy seas at 35 knots (65 km/h; 40 mph) and was forced to reduce speed to 27 knots (50 km/h; 31 mph) after she had lost two men overboard. The British destroyer was better suited for the conditions and began to close on Bernd von Arnim. Lieutenant Commander (Korvettenkapitän) Curt Rechel, captain of von Arnim, turned his ship to the north-east, closer to the heavy cruiser Admiral Hipper. The ships exchanged fire without effect for an hour until Hipper came within range and sank Glowworm shortly afterward.

The German destroyers reached the Ofotfjord on the morning of 9 April and Commodore Friedrich Bonte took his flagship Wilhelm Heidkamp, Bernd von Arnim and Georg Thiele down the fjord to Narvik. A heavy snowstorm allowed von Arnim and Thiele to enter the harbor without challenge and tie up at a pier. The mountain troops immediately began disembarking, but the ship was spotted by the coast defense ship Norge a few minutes later. The latter ship immediately opened fire and was able to fire approximately 13 shells at 600–800 meters (660–870 yd) range before von Arnim was able to fire seven torpedoes. Only two struck the Norwegian ship, but they detonated one or more of the ship's magazines and she immediately capsized and sank. None of the Norwegian shells hit either of the two German destroyers due to the darkness and falling snow, despite the short range. Von Arnim lowered boats to rescue the surviving Norwegian sailors and was able to pick up 96 men together with boats from the merchantmen in harbor.

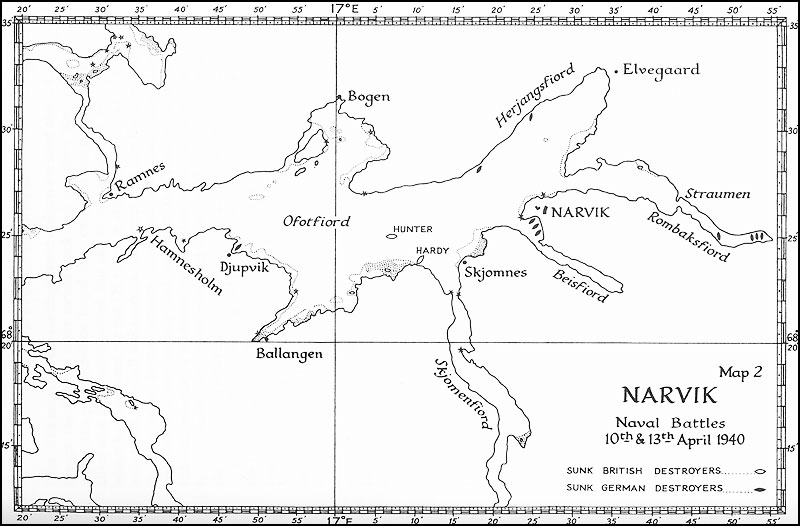
A map of the Ofotfjord

Von Arnim and Thiele were the first to refuel from the single tanker that had made it safely to Narvik and later moved to the Ballangenfjord, a southern arm of the Ofotfjord, closer to the entrance. Shortly before dawn on 10 April, the five destroyers of the British 2nd Destroyer Flotilla surprised the five German destroyers in Narvik harbor. They torpedoed two destroyers and badly damaged the other three while suffering only minor damage themselves. As they were beginning to withdraw they encountered the three destroyers of the 4th Flotilla which had been alerted in the Herjansfjord when the British began their attack. The Germans opened fire first, but the gunnery for both sides was not effective due to the mist and the smoke screen laid by the British as they retreated down the Ofotfjord. The German ships had to turn away to avoid a salvo of three torpedoes fired by one of the destroyers in Narvik, but von Arnim and Thiele had also been alerted and were coming up to engage the British.

The two German destroyers crossed the T of the British flotilla and were able to fire full broadsides at a range of only 4,000 meters (13,000 ft). They first engaged the British flagship, HMS Hardy, and badly damaged her. Both of her forward guns were knocked out and the forward superstructure was set afire. Hardy was forced to beach herself lest she sink, and the German ships switched their fire to HMS Havock, the next ship in line. Their fire was relatively ineffective and both sides fired torpedoes without scoring any hits. Havock pulled out and dropped to the rear to fight off any pursuit by the ships of the 4th Flotilla. This placed HMS Hunter in the lead and she was quickly set on fire by the German ships. Thiele probably also hit her with a torpedo and she was rammed from behind by HMS Hotspur when the latter ship lost steering control. Hotspur was able to disengage, but Hunter capsized shortly afterward. The three remaining British ships were able to escape from the Germans under the cover of a smoke screen. Von Arnim had been hit by five British shells, which had knocked out one boiler. This was repaired by the morning of 13 April and she received six torpedoes from the badly damaged destroyers.

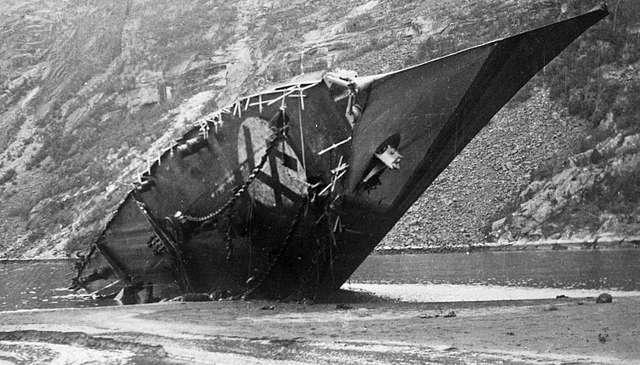
Wreck of Bernd von Arnim in the Rombaksfjorden

On the night of 12 April, Commander Erich Bey, the senior surviving German officer, received word to expect an attack the following day by British capital ships escorted by a large number of destroyers and supported by carrier aircraft. The battleship Warspite and nine destroyers duly appeared on 13 April, although earlier than Commander Bey had expected, and caught the Germans out of position. The five operable destroyers, including Bernd von Arnim, charged out of Narvik harbor and engaged the British ships. Although no hits were scored, they did inflict splinter damage on several of the destroyers. The ship was able to make a torpedo attack on the British destroyers before being driven off, but her torpedoes all missed. Lack of ammunition forced the German ships to retreat to the Rombaksfjorden (the easternmost branch of the Ofotfjord), east of Narvik, where they might attempt to ambush pursuing British destroyers. Von Arnim had exhausted her ammunition and she was beached at the head of the fjord. Her crew placed demolition charges and abandoned the ship. By the time the British reached the ship she had rolled over onto her side. The ship's crew joined the German troops ashore and participated in the campaign until the British evacuated the area in June.
