= Max-Eckart Wolff =

- Born: 19 December 1902; Wernigerode, German Empire
- Died: 9 November 1988 (aged 85); Bremen, West Germany
- Military career
- Allegiance: Weimar Republic; Nazi Germany; West Germany
- Branch: Reichsmarine; Kriegsmarine; German Navy
- Service years: 1922–1945; 1956–1961
- Rank: Kapitän zur See; Flottillenadmiral
- Commands: destroyer Z2 Georg Thiele
- Conflicts: World War II
- Awards: Knight's Cross of the Iron Cross

Max-Eckart Wolff (19 December 1902 – 9 November 1988) was a naval commander in the Kriegsmarine of Nazi Germany during World War II. He was a recipient of the Knight's Cross of the Iron Cross.

Wolff as commander of destroyer Z2 Georg Thiele was credited with the sinking of the British destroyers HMS Hardy and HMS Hunter on 10 April 1940. On 13 April 1940 he torpedoed and damaged HMS Eskimo. He later served as the Führer der Zerstörer (Commander of Destroyers) from 1943 to 1944.

In 1956, Wolff became the first commander of the independent post-war West German Bundesmarine.

== Awards ==
- Iron Cross (1939) 2nd Class (6 November 1939) & 1st Class (12 May 1940)
- Wound Badge in Black (13 May 1940)
- Knight's Cross of the Iron Cross on 4 August 1940 as Korvettenkapitän and commander of destroyer Z2 Georg Thiele
- Destroyer War Badge (9 October 1940)
- Narvik Shield (10 November 1940)
- Great Cross of the Order of Merit of the Federal Republic of Germany (March 1963)

Military offices
Preceded by Konteradmiral Erich Bey	Führer der Zerstörer; 1 November 1943 – 15 January 1944	Succeeded by Kapitän zur See Theodor von Bechtolsheim
Preceded by —	Commander-in-Chief German Fleet (CINCGERFLEET); 1956 – 1957	Succeeded by Konteradmiral Rolf Johannesson
