= Bernard Warburton-Lee =

British naval officer (1895–1940)

Captain Bernard Warburton-Lee VC
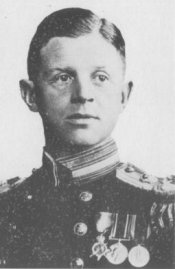
- Born: 13 September 1895; Broad Oak, Wrexham, Wales
- Died: 10 April 1940 (aged 44); HMS Hardy, Ofotfjord, Norway
- Burial place: Ballangen New Cemetery, Norway
- Military career
- Allegiance: United Kingdom
- Branch: Royal Navy
- Service years: 1908–1940
- Rank: Captain
- Commands: 2nd Destroyer Flotilla (1939–40); HMS Hardy (1939–40); Flag Captain, HMS Effingham (1938–39); HMS Witch (1934–36); HMS Bryony (1933–34); HMS Vanessa (1928–30); HMS Walpole (1926–27); HMS Tuscan (1924–25)
- Conflicts: First World War; Second World War: Norwegian campaign; Operation Weserübung; Narvik campaign; First Naval Battle of Narvik (DOW)
- Awards: Victoria Cross; Mentioned in Despatches; War Cross (Norway)

Captain Bernard Armitage Warburton Warburton-Lee, VC (13 September 1895 – 10 April 1940) was a senior officer in the Royal Navy and a posthumous recipient of the Victoria Cross, the highest award for gallantry in the face of the enemy that can be awarded to British and Empire forces.

== Naval career ==
Warburton-Lee attended the British Army's Staff College, Camberley, from 1931 to 1932, where Brian Horrocks, later a lieutenant general and a corps commander, was among his fellow students. Horrocks wrote that it "was the practice for a naval officer to join the course for the final year, and our sailor turned out to be that remarkable all-rounder Warburton-Lee who won the V.C. at Narvik".

=== Spanish Civil War ===
In 1936, due to the outbreak of the Spanish Civil War and because there was fear of social unrest in the naval station, the Foreign Office in London organized a ship to repatriate the remaining British citizens and on 22 July 1936 HMS Witch, captained by Warburton-Lee, departed from Ferrol in northwestern Spain for Britain.

=== Second World War ===
Warburton-Lee was 44 years old and a captain when the following action took place during the Second World War, for which he was awarded the Victoria Cross.

On 10 April 1940 in Ofotfjord in Narvik, Norway, in the First Battle of Narvik, Captain Warburton-Lee of HMS Hardy commanded the British 2nd Destroyer Flotilla, consisting of five destroyers (HMS Hardy, Havock, Hostile, Hotspur and Hunter), in a surprise attack on German destroyers and merchant ships in a blinding snowstorm. This attack was successful, but was almost immediately followed by an engagement with five more German destroyers, during which Captain Warburton-Lee was mortally wounded by a shell which hit Hardy's bridge. For his exploits in this engagement he was posthumously awarded Britain's highest decoration for valour in combat, the Victoria Cross. During the Second World War, only 23 Victoria Crosses were awarded to members of the Royal Navy and Royal Naval Reserve, of whom only approximately 11 survived. In 1942 he was also, posthumously, awarded the Norwegian War Cross.

==== VC citation ====
Bernard Warburton-Lee's VC citation reads as follows:

For gallantry, enterprise and daring in command of the force engaged in the First Battle of Narvik, on 10th April, 1940. On being ordered to carry out an attack on Narvik, Captain Warburton-Lee learned that the enemy was holding the place in much greater force than had been thought. He signalled to the Admiralty that six German destroyers and one submarine were there, that the channel might be mined, and that he intended to attack at dawn. The Admiralty replied that he alone could judge whether to attack, and that whatever decision he made would have full support. Captain Warburton led his flotilla of five destroyers up the fjord in heavy snow-storms, arriving off Narvik just after daybreak. He took the enemy completely by surprise and made three successful attacks on warships and merchantmen in the harbour. As the flotilla withdrew, five enemy destroyers of superior gunpower were encountered and engaged. The captain was mortally wounded by a shell which hit the bridge of H.M.S. Hardy. His last signal was "Continue to engage the enemy".

This was the first VC to be gazetted in the Second World War.

== Personal life ==
Warburton-Lee married Elizabeth Campbell Swinton, the daughter of Captain George Swinton of Kimmerghame (see Clan Swinton), on 9 October 1924.

== Bibliography ==
- Horrocks, Sir Brian (1960). A Full Life. Barnsley: Leo Cooper. ISBN 0-85052-144-0.
