= German destroyer Z9 Wolfgang Zenker =

Type 1934A-class destroyer

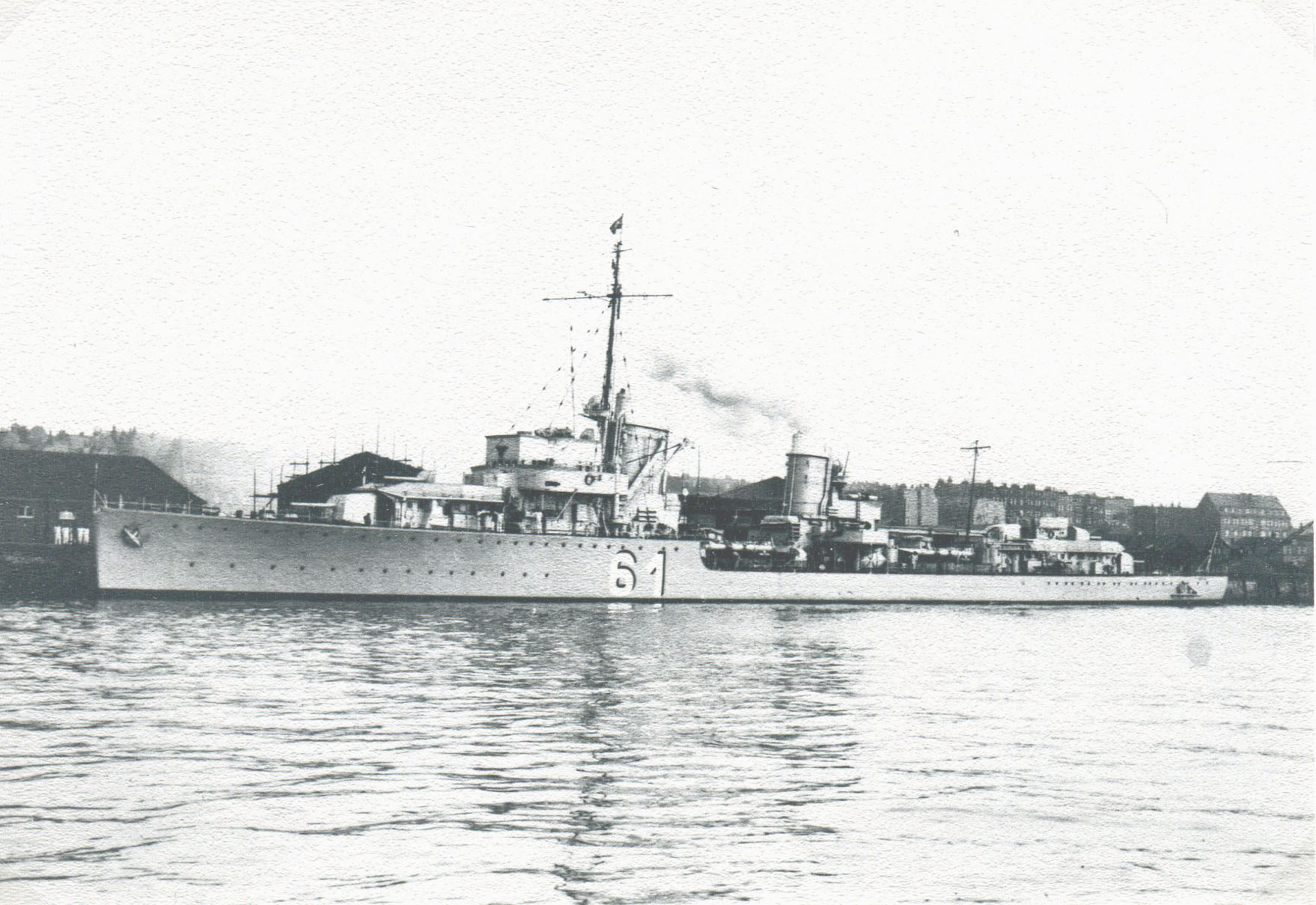
- Wolfgang Zenker c. 1934

History

Nazi Germany
- Name: Z9 Wolfgang Zenker
- Namesake: Wolfgang Zenker
- Ordered: 9 January 1935
- Builder: Germania, Kiel
- Yard number: G535
- Laid down: 22 March 1935
- Launched: 27 March 1936
- Completed: 2 July 1938
- Fate: Scuttled, 13 April 1940

General characteristics (as built)
- Class & type: Type 1934A-class destroyer
- Displacement: 2,171 long tons (2,206 t) (standard); 3,190 long tons (3,240 t) (deep load)
- Length: 119 m (390 ft 5 in) o/a; 114 m (374 ft 0 in) w/l
- Beam: 11.30 m (37 ft 1 in)
- Draft: 4.23 m (13 ft 11 in)
- Installed power: 70,000 PS (51,000 kW; 69,000 shp); 6 × water-tube boilers
- Propulsion: 2 shafts, 2 × geared steam turbines
- Speed: 36 knots (67 km/h; 41 mph)
- Range: 1,530 nmi (2,830 km; 1,760 mi) at 19 knots (35 km/h; 22 mph)
- Complement: 325
- Armament: 5 × single 12.7 cm (5 in) guns; 2 × twin 3.7 cm (1.5 in) AA guns; 6 × single 2 cm (0.8 in) AA guns; 2 × quadruple 53.3 cm (21 in) torpedo tubes; 60 mines; 32–64 depth charges, 4 throwers and 6 individual racks

Z9 Wolfgang Zenker was a Type 1934A-class destroyer built for Nazi Germany's Kriegsmarine in the mid-1930s. Several days after the start of World War II, she unsuccessfully attacked, together with another destroyer, Polish ships anchored at the naval base on the Hel Peninsula. In early 1940 the ship made two successful minelaying sorties off the English coast that claimed six merchant ships. Wolfgang Zenker participated in the early stages of the Norwegian Campaign by transporting troops to the Narvik area in early April 1940. The ship fought in both naval Battles of Narvik several days later and had to be scuttled after she exhausted her ammunition.

== Design and description ==
Wolfgang Zenker had an overall length of 119 meters (390 ft 5 in) and was 114 meters (374 ft 0 in) long at the waterline. The ship had a beam of 11.30 meters (37 ft 1 in), and a maximum draft of 4.23 meters (13 ft 11 in). She displaced 2,171 metric tons (2,137 long tons) at standard and 3,110 metric tons (3,060 long tons) at deep load. The Wagner geared steam turbines were designed to produce 70,000 metric horsepower (51,000 kW; 69,000 shp) which would propel the ship at 36 knots (67 km/h; 41 mph). Steam was provided to the turbines by six high-pressure Benson boilers with superheaters. Wolfgang Zenker carried a maximum of 752 metric tons (740 long tons) of fuel oil which was intended to give a range of 4,400 nmi (8,100 km; 5,100 mi) at 19 knots (35 km/h; 22 mph), but the ship proved top-heavy in service and 30% of the fuel had to be retained as ballast low in the ship. The effective range proved to be only 1,530 nmi (2,830 km; 1,760 mi) at 19 knots (35 km/h; 22 mph).

Wolfgang Zenker carried five 12.7 cm SK C/34 guns in single mounts with gun shields, two each superimposed, fore and aft. The fifth gun was carried on top of the rear deckhouse. Her anti-aircraft armament consisted of four 3.7 cm SK C/30 guns in two twin mounts abreast the rear funnel and six 2 cm C/30 guns in single mounts. The ship carried eight above-water 53.3-centimeter (21.0 in) torpedo tubes in two power-operated mounts. A pair of reload torpedoes were provided for each mount. Four depth charge throwers were mounted on the sides of the rear deckhouse and they were supplemented by six racks for individual depth charges on the sides of the stern. Enough depth charges were carried for either two or four patterns of 16 charges each. Mine rails could be fitted on the rear deck that had a maximum capacity of 60 mines. 'GHG' (German: Gruppenhorchgerät) passive hydrophones were fitted to detect submarines.

== Career ==
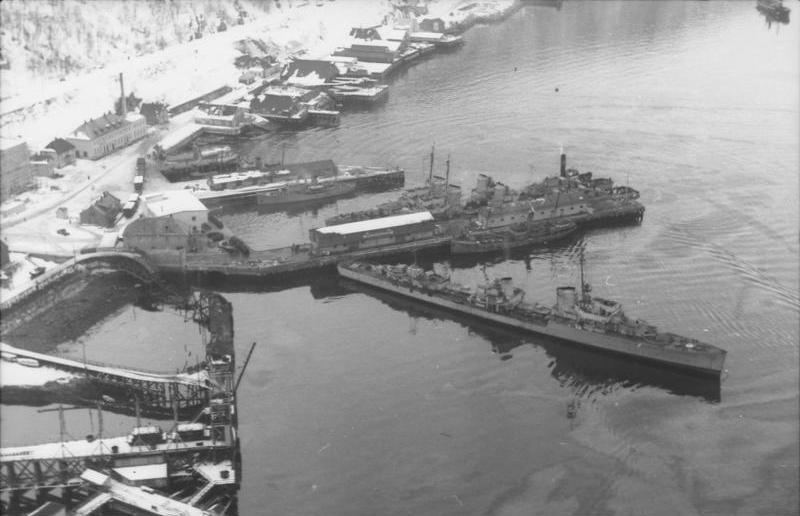
Wolfgang Zenker is the destroyer farthest away from the photographer, the front one being Z17 Diether von Roeder. The smaller vessels are captured Norwegian patrol boats.

The ship was ordered on 9 January 1935 and laid down at Germania, Kiel on 22 March 1935 as yard number G535. She was launched on 27 March 1936 and completed on 2 July 1938. Wolfgang Zenker participated in the August 1938 Fleet Review as part of the 6th Destroyer Division and the following fleet exercise. On the morning of 3 September 1939, after the start of World War II, the destroyers Leberecht Maass and Wolfgang Zenker, under the command of Rear Admiral Günther Lütjens, attacked the Polish destroyer Wicher and the minelayer Gryf as they laid anchored in the naval base on the Hel Peninsula. The German ships opened fire at a range of 12,700 meters (13,900 yd). The Polish ships, as well as a coast defense battery of 15-centimeter (5.9 in) replied effectively and forced the German destroyers to make evasive maneuvers and to lay a smoke screen to throw off the aim of the Polish gunners. A 15-centimeter shell struck Leberecht Maass, killing four men and disabling one gun. Admiral Lutjens ordered the action broken off 40 minutes later as the German fire was ineffective.

Although the other destroyers were busy escorting the German heavy ships and laying minefields off the British coast, Wolfgang Zenker played no part of any of these operations until the night of 10/11 January 1940 when she laid a minefield off Cromer with her sisters Bruno Heinemann and Erich Koellner. Three ships totaling 11,155 Gross Register Tons (GRT) were sunk by this minefield. The same three ships made another sortie on the night of 9/10 February into the same area and laid 157 mines that claimed three ships totaling 11,855 GRT. Wolfgang Zenker suffered ice damage in mid-February and was forced to return prematurely when she was escorting the battleships Gneisenau and Scharnhorst when they attempted to intercept British convoys to Scandinavia.

Wolfgang Zenker was allocated to Group 1 for the Norwegian portion of Operation Weserübung. The group's task was to transport the 139th Mountain Infantry Regiment (139. Gebirgsjäger Regiment) and the headquarters of the 3rd Mountain Division (3. Gebirgs-Division) to seize Narvik. The ships began loading troops on 6 April and set sail the next day. When they arrived at the Ofotfjord, west of Narvik, on the early morning of 9 April, the three ships of the 4th Flotilla, under the command of Commander Erich Bey, were ordered to land their troops in the Herjangsfjord (a northern branch of the Ofotfjord) in order to capture a Norwegian Army armory at Elvegårdsmoen. The troops encountered little resistance, but off-loading them was slow because there was only a single wooden pier available. Wolfgang Zenker was able to partially refuel during the following night, but returned to the Herjansfjord well before dawn.

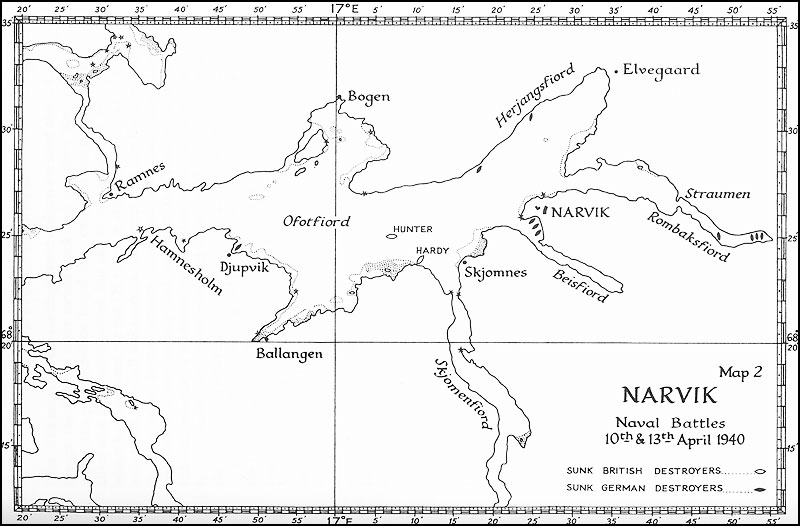
A map of the Ofotfjord

Shortly before dawn on 10 April, the five destroyers of the British 2nd Destroyer Flotilla surprised the German ships in Narvik harbor. They torpedoed two destroyers and badly damaged the other three while suffering only minor damage themselves. As they were beginning to withdraw they encountered the three destroyers of the 4th Flotilla which had been alerted when the British began their attack. The Germans opened fire first, but the gunnery for both sides was not effective due to the mist and the smoke screen laid by the British as they retreated down the Ofotfjord. The German ships had to turn away to avoid a salvo of three torpedoes fired by one of the destroyers in Narvik. Commander Bey's other two ships were very low on fuel and all three were running low on ammunition, so he decided not to continue the pursuit of the British ships since they were being engaged by the last two destroyers of Group 1.

Commander Bey was ordered during the afternoon of 10 April to return to Germany with all seaworthy ships that evening. Only Wolfgang Zenker and her sister Erich Giese were ready for sea and they slipped out of the Ofotfjord and turned south. Visibility was good that evening and they spotted the light cruiser HMS Penelope and her two escorting destroyers and Commander Bey decided to turn back even though his ships had not been spotted by the British. Three other destroyers refuelled and completed their repairs on 11 April, but Bey decided against another breakout attempt despite the fog and poor visibility that night. While at anchor, Wolfgang Zenker briefly grounded during the night and damaged her port propeller, which limited her speed to 20 knots (37 km/h; 23 mph). Bey made no attempt to breakout during the night of 12/13 April.

That night he received word to expect an attack the following day by British capital ships escorted by a large number of destroyers and supported by carrier aircraft. Wolfgang Zenker was still under repair, although her torpedoes had been replenished from the damaged destroyers. The battleship HMS Warspite and nine destroyers duly appeared on 13 April, although earlier than Commander Bey had expected, and caught the Germans out of position. The five operable destroyers, including Wolfgang Zenker, charged out of Narvik harbor and engaged the British ships. Although no hits were scored, they did inflict splinter damage on several of the destroyers. Wolfgang Zenker was able to make a torpedo attack on Warspite before being driven off, but her torpedoes all missed. Lack of ammunition forced the German ships to retreat to the Rombaksfjorden (the easternmost branch of the Ofotfjord), east of Narvik, where they might attempt to ambush pursuing British destroyers. Wolfgang Zenker had exhausted her ammunition and she was beached at the head of the fjord. Her crew placed demolition charges and abandoned the ship. By the time the British reached the ship she had rolled over onto her side.
