= Erich Bey =

German admiral (1898–1943)

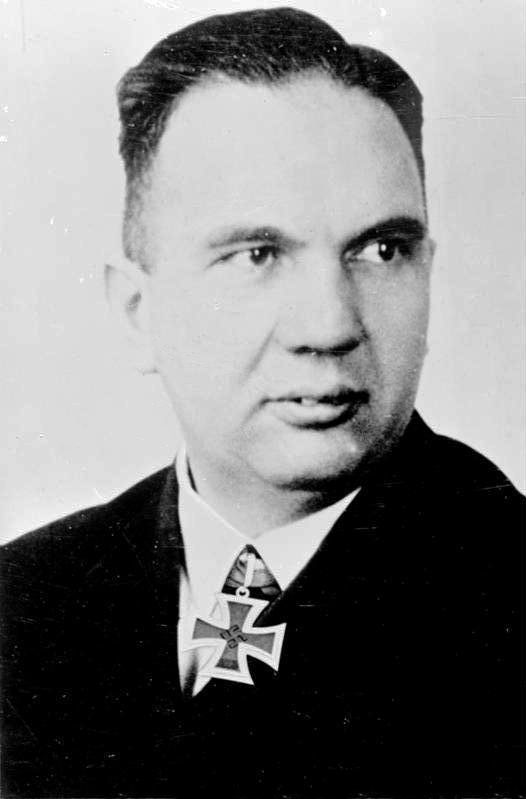
- Born: 23 March 1898; Hamburg, German Empire
- Died: 26 December 1943 (aged 45); North Cape, Norway
- Military career
- Allegiance: German Empire; Weimar Republic; Nazi Germany
- Branch: Imperial German Navy; Reichsmarine; Kriegsmarine
- Service years: 1916–1943
- Rank: Konteradmiral
- Nickname: Achmed
- Commands: Z14 Friedrich Ihn; 4. Zerstörerflottille
- Conflicts: World War I; World War II; Battle of the North Cape †
- Awards: Knight's Cross of the Iron Cross

Konteradmiral Erich Bey (23 March 1898 – 26 December 1943) was a German admiral during World War II. He served as commander of the Kriegsmarine destroyer forces and commanded the battleship Scharnhorst in the Battle of the North Cape on 26 December 1943, during which he went down with his ship.

== Career ==
Bey joined the Kaiserliche Marine on 13 June 1916, served in its destroyer arm during World War I and was awarded the Iron Cross, 2nd class, and the Hanseatic Cross of Hamburg. Following the end of the war, he stayed in the navy and continued his career as the Nazi Party rose to power in Germany. By the start of World War II he was commissioned a Fregattenkapitän (frigate captain).

Bey led the 4th Destroyer Flotilla, consisting of the destroyers Z11 Bernd von Arnim, Z12 Erich Giese and Z13 Erich Koellner, as part of Kommodore Friedrich Bonte's force that carried General Eduard Dietl's mountain troops for the occupation of Narvik during the German invasion of Norway on 9 April 1940. In the following Battles of Narvik on 10 April and 13 April, Bey distinguished himself by leading a small group of destroyers in a brave though doomed action against a superior Royal Navy force that included the battleship HMS Warspite.

Bey was awarded with the Knight's Cross of the Iron Cross on 9 May 1940. The next day he was promoted to captain and appointed commander of the German destroyer force (Führer der Zerstörer), succeeding Commodore Bonte, who had been killed on 10 April in the first Battle of Narvik. Bey then commanded the destroyer screen protecting the ships of the Brest Group (Scharnhorst, Gneisenau, Prinz Eugen) during Operation Cerberus (the “Channel Dash”) in February 1942. Of the three, Scharnhorst suffered extensive damage, having struck a naval mine laid off the Dover Straits.

== Battle of the North Cape ==
Promoted to Konteradmiral (Rear Admiral), on 1 March 1943, Bey on 26 December led a task force consisting of the battleship Scharnhorst and the destroyers Z29, Z30, Z33, Z34 and Z38 out of the Altafjord in Operation Ostfront. The first and only surface sortie ordered by Grand Admiral Karl Dönitz, Bey's objective was to intercept the Allied Convoy JW 55B en route to Murmansk.

Bey's initial force of Scharnhorst and five destroyers was superior to the convoy's escorting British cruisers and destroyers in terms of firepower. However, Bey's flagship was outmatched by Admiral Bruce Fraser's battleship HMS Duke of York which led the British Home Fleet shadowing the convoy. Scharnhorst was expected to use her speed to avoid an engagement with the Duke of York.

Poor weather, heavy seas and inadequate Luftwaffe reconnaissance prevented Bey from initially locating the convoy, so he detached his destroyers to fan out and assist in the search. However, the storm meant that Bey's destroyers ended up playing no part in the battle. Bey in the Scharnhorst managed to locate the convoy, but in the first engagement of the ensuing Battle of North Cape, while trading fire with the British convoy's screening cruisers, Scharnhorst's radar was destroyed, rendering her more or less blind during the long winter night. Scharnhorst was then caught by the more powerful Duke of York and suffered critical damage before being sunk after several torpedo hits from destroyers. Of Scharnhorst's crew of 1,968, Royal Navy vessels fished 36 men alive from the icy sea, not one of them an officer.

== Personal life ==
Bey had two daughters, the second of whom, Frauke Heard-Bey, would go on to become a respected historian, archivist and author.

== Awards ==
- Iron Cross (1914), 2nd Class
- Hanseatic Cross of Hamburg
- Clasp to the Iron Cross (1939), 2nd Class (16 October 1939)
- Iron Cross (1939), 1st Class (20 November 1939)
- Knight's Cross of the Iron Cross on 9 May 1940 as Kapitän zur See and chief of the 4. Zerstörer-Flottille
- Narvik Shield
- Destroyer War Badge
- Gold Wound Badge
- Honour Cross of the World War 1914/1918

Military offices
Preceded by none	Chief of the 4. Zerstörerflottille; April 1939 – 13 April 1940	Succeeded by disbanded
Preceded by none	Chief of the 6. Zerstörerflottille; 14 May 1940 – 1 November 1940	Succeeded by Kapitän zur See Alfred Schulze-Hinrichs
Preceded by Kapitän zur See Friedrich Bonte	Führer der Zerstörer; 10 April 1940 – 14 April 1940	Succeeded by Korvettenkapitän Alfred Schemmel
Preceded by Korvettenkapitän Alfred Schemmel	Führer der Zerstörer; 14 May 1940 – 26 December 1943	Succeeded by Kapitän zur See Max-Eckart Wolff
