= German destroyer Z12 Erich Giese =

Type 1934A-class destroyer

Coordinates: 68°25′40″N 17°21′30″E

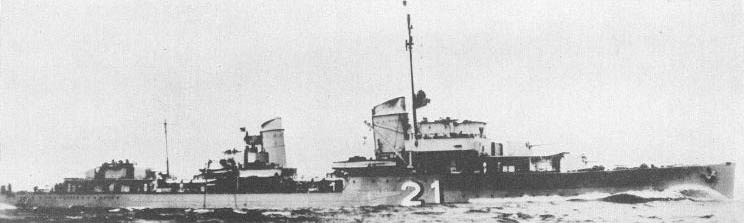
- Her sister ship Z5 Paul Jakobi c. 1938

History

Nazi Germany
- Name: Z12 Erich Giese
- Namesake: Erich Giese
- Ordered: 9 January 1935
- Builder: Germania, Kiel
- Yard number: G538
- Laid down: 3 May 1935
- Launched: 12 March 1937
- Completed: 4 March 1939
- Fate: Sunk, 13 April 1940

General characteristics (as built)
- Class & type: Type 1934A-class destroyer
- Displacement: 2,171 long tons (2,206 t) (standard); 3,190 long tons (3,240 t) (deep load)
- Length: 119 m (390 ft 5 in) o/a; 114 m (374 ft 0 in) w/l
- Beam: 11.30 m (37 ft 1 in)
- Draft: 4.23 m (13 ft 11 in)
- Installed power: 70,000 PS (51,000 kW; 69,000 shp); 6 × water-tube boilers
- Propulsion: 2 shafts, 2 × geared steam turbines
- Speed: 36 knots (67 km/h; 41 mph)
- Range: 1,530 nmi (2,830 km; 1,760 mi) at 19 knots (35 km/h; 22 mph)
- Complement: 325
- Armament: 5 × single 12.7 cm (5 in) guns; 2 × twin 3.7 cm (1.5 in) AA guns; 6 × single 2 cm (0.8 in) AA guns; 2 × quadruple 53.3 cm (21 in) torpedo tubes; 60 mines; 32–64 depth charges, 4 throwers and 6 individual racks

Z12 Erich Giese was a Type 1934A-class destroyer built for Nazi Germany's Kriegsmarine in the late 1930s. At the beginning of World War II, the ship was used in the German Bight to lay minefields in German waters. In late 1939 the ship made one successful minelaying sortie off the English coast that claimed two merchant ships. While returning from that sortie, she torpedoed a British destroyer without being detected and continued on her way. During the early stages of the Norwegian Campaign, Erich Giese fought in both naval Battles of Narvik in mid-April 1940 and was sunk by British destroyers during the Second Battle of Narvik.

== Design and description ==
Erich Giese had an overall length of 119 meters (390 ft 5 in) and was 114 meters (374 ft 0 in) long at the waterline. The ship had a beam of 11.30 meters (37 ft 1 in), and a maximum draft of 4.23 meters (13 ft 11 in). She displaced 2,171 metric tons (2,137 long tons) at standard and 3,190 metric tons (3,140 long tons) at deep load. The Wagner geared steam turbines were designed to produce 70,000 metric horsepower (51,000 kW; 69,000 shp) which would propel the ship at 36 knots (67 km/h; 41 mph). Steam was provided to the turbines by six high-pressure Benson boilers with superheaters. Erich Giese carried a maximum of 752 metric tons (740 long tons) of fuel oil which was intended to give a range of 4,400 nautical miles (8,100 km; 5,100 mi) at 19 knots (35 km/h; 22 mph), but the ship proved top-heavy in service and 30% of the fuel had to be retained as ballast low in the ship. The effective range proved to be only 1,530 nmi (2,830 km; 1,760 mi) at 19 knots (35 km/h; 22 mph).

Erich Giese carried five 12.7 cm SK C/34 guns in single mounts with gun shields, two each superimposed, fore and aft. The fifth gun was carried on top of the rear deckhouse. Her anti-aircraft armament consisted of four 3.7 cm SK C/30 guns in two twin mounts abreast the rear funnel and six 2 cm C/30 guns in single mounts. The ship carried eight above-water 53.3-centimeter (21.0 in) torpedo tubes in two power-operated mounts. A pair of reload torpedoes were provided for each mount. Four depth charge throwers were mounted on the sides of the rear deckhouse and they were supplemented by six racks for individual depth charges on the sides of the stern. Enough depth charges were carried for either two or four patterns of 16 charges each. Mine rails could be fitted on the rear deck that had a maximum capacity of 60 mines. 'GHG' (German: Gruppenhorchgerät) passive hydrophones were fitted to detect submarines.

== Construction and career ==
The ship was ordered on 4 August 1934 and laid down at Germania, Kiel on 3 May 1935 as yard number G538. She was launched on 12 March 1937 and completed on 4 March 1939. Erich Giese was initially assigned to 8th Destroyer Division (8. Zerstörer-Division) part of the 4th Destroyer Flotilla (4. Zerstörer-Flottille) under the command of Commander (Fregattenkapitän) Brocksien. Two months later, the ship escorted into Hamburg the convoy returning the German Condor Legion from Spain. When World War II began, Erich Giese was assigned to the German Bight where she joined her sisters in laying defensive minefields. The ship also patrolled the Skagerrak to inspect neutral shipping for contraband goods. The ship attempted to lay a minefield off the British coast on the night of 12/13 November, but had to turn back to escort her consorts, Theodor Riedel and Hermann Schoemann, back to Germany when they suffered machinery breakdowns. Eight days later, she was one of the destroyers escorting the battleships Gneisenau and Scharnhorst through the North Sea to break out into the North Atlantic.

Led by Commander (Fregattenkapitän) Erich Bey in his flagship Hans Lody, Erich Giese and Bernd von Arnim left port on the morning of 6 December to lay a minefield off Cromer. The latter ship had severe boiler problems and was ordered to return to port in the late afternoon while the other two continued their mission. They spotted several darkened ships as they approached their destination, including the destroyers HMS Juno and HMS Jersey, but were not spotted in return. As the two German destroyers withdrew after having laid their mines, they spotted the two British destroyers again at a range of 8,000 meters (8,700 yd) and closed to attack. When the range dropped to 4,600 meters (5,000 yd), Lody fired three torpedoes at Juno, the leading British ship, while Giese fired four at Jersey. None of Lody's torpedoes struck their target, but one of Giese's hit Jersey abreast her aft torpedo mount. The torpedo detonated in an oil fuel tank and started a major fire. Neither British ship spotted the German destroyers and they continued on while Juno turned about to help her sister. Two British ships totalling 5,286 Gross Register Tons were sunk by this minefield. Giese was refitted at the Germaniawerft shipyard after her return on 8 December.

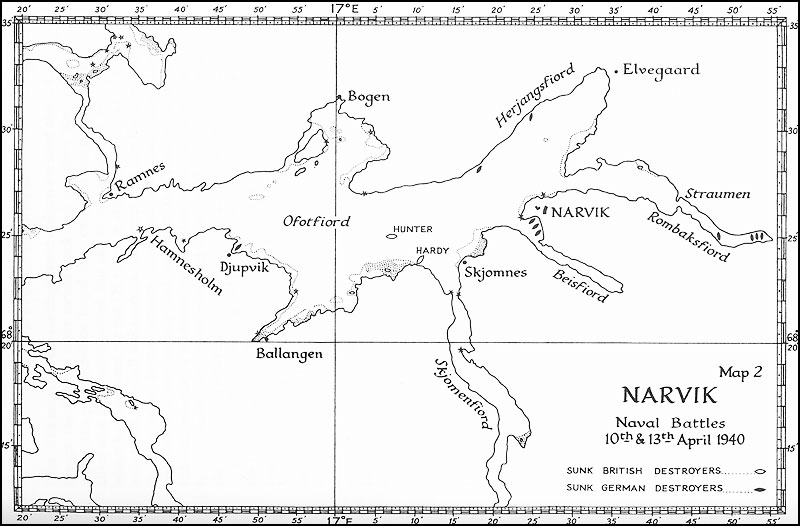
A map of the Ofotfjord

The ship was allocated to Group 1 for the Norwegian portion of Operation Weserübung. The group's task was to transport the 139th Mountain Infantry Regiment (139. Gebirgsjäger Regiment) and the headquarters of the 3rd Mountain Division (3. Gebirgs-Division) to seize Narvik. The ships began loading troops on 6 April and sailed the next day. Giese fell behind the rest of Group 1 as the result of oil leaks, machinery breakdowns, and contaminated fuel oil. She fell further behind when Lieutenant Commander (Korvettenkapitän) Karl Smidt turned the ship about to recover a soldier who had been washed overboard by the high seas. Giese had little usable fuel left by this time and was forced to continue at a slower speed to conserve fuel. When the ship arrived at her destination on 9 April, she landed her troops in the Herjangsfjord (a northern branch of the Ofotfjord) to reinforce the other troops previously landed there in order to capture the Norwegian Army armory at Elvegårdsmoen. Later in the day, Erich Giese moved to Narvik harbor, but was not able to refuel before she was ordered to return to the Herjangsfjord well before dawn together with her sisters Wolfgang Zenker and Erich Koellner.

Shortly before dawn on 10 April, the five destroyers of the British 2nd Destroyer Flotilla surprised the German ships in Narvik harbor. They torpedoed two destroyers and badly damaged the other three while suffering only minor damage themselves. As they were beginning to withdraw they encountered the three destroyers of the German 4th Flotilla which had been alerted when the British began their attack. The Germans opened fire first, but the gunnery for both sides was not effective due to the mist and the smoke screen laid by the British as they retreated down the Ofotfjord. The German ships had to turn away to avoid a salvo of three torpedoes fired by one of the destroyers in Narvik. Giese and Koellner were very low on fuel and all three were running low on ammunition, so Commander Bey decided not to continue the pursuit of the British ships since they were being engaged by the last two destroyers of Group 1.

Commander Bey was ordered during the afternoon of 10 April to return to Germany with all seaworthy ships that evening. Only Erich Giese and Wolfgang Zenker were ready for sea and they slipped out of the Ofotfjord and turned south. Visibility was good that night and they spotted the light cruiser HMS Penelope and her two escorting destroyers and Commander Bey decided to turn back even though his ships had not been spotted by the British. Three other destroyers refuelled and completed their repairs on 11 April, but Bey decided against another breakout attempt despite the fog and poor visibility that night. Bey made no attempt to break out during the night of 12/13 April, possibly because two of the destroyers had been damaged earlier in the day when they ran aground.

That night he received word to expect an attack the following day by British capital ships escorted by a large number of destroyers and supported by carrier aircraft. Erich Giese reported that she was only capable of 28 knots (52 km/h; 32 mph), although her torpedoes had been replenished from the damaged destroyers. The battleship HMS Warspite and nine destroyers duly appeared on 13 April, although earlier than Commander Bey had expected, and caught the Germans out of position. The five operable destroyers, not including Giese, charged out of Narvik harbor and engaged the British ships. The ship did not have enough steam raised to participate and remained in the harbor. She attempted to leave the harbor after the British had driven off the other German ships, but her port engine seized up and left her almost dead in the water at the mouth of the harbor. While attempting to repair her engine, Giese was approached by the destroyers HMS Punjabi and HMS Bedouin which fired five torpedoes at her. All of them missed and Giese's torpedoes were equally unsuccessful. She did hit Punjabi with six or seven 12.7 cm shells which holed the ship several times just above the waterline, wrecked her fire-control system, severed her main steam line and started several fires. Casualties aboard Punjabi were seven killed and 14 wounded. In the meantime, Giese had managed to repair her engine after ten minutes of work and limped forward at her maximum speed of 12 knots (22 km/h; 14 mph) to engage the remaining British destroyers. Bedouin closed to point-blank range and had her forward gun turret knocked out by Giese, but the latter was hit at least 20 times and reduced to a blazing wreck that finally sank shortly before midnight. Eighty-three of her crew were killed outright during the battle, but the destroyer HMS Foxhound did rescue 11 men, two of whom subsequently died of their wounds. Surviving crew members later testified that they had been machine-gunned at close range while drifting in the water, an action which was considered especially shocking as the Giese had done so much only three days previously to rescue members of Hunter's ship's company. The ship's remaining crewmen managed to get ashore one way or another. (Note: Koop and Schmolke say 87 dead as do Hildebrand, Röhr and Steinmetz)

In 2011, a 150 kilograms (330 lb) bronze Reichsadler was salvaged from the wreck of Giese, in order to be displayed at the War Museum in Narvik. The ship's bell from Giese was removed by looters in the 1960s, as were the Reichsadler from the nine other German destroyers sunk at Narvik.
