= Friedrich Bonte =

German naval officer (1896–1940)

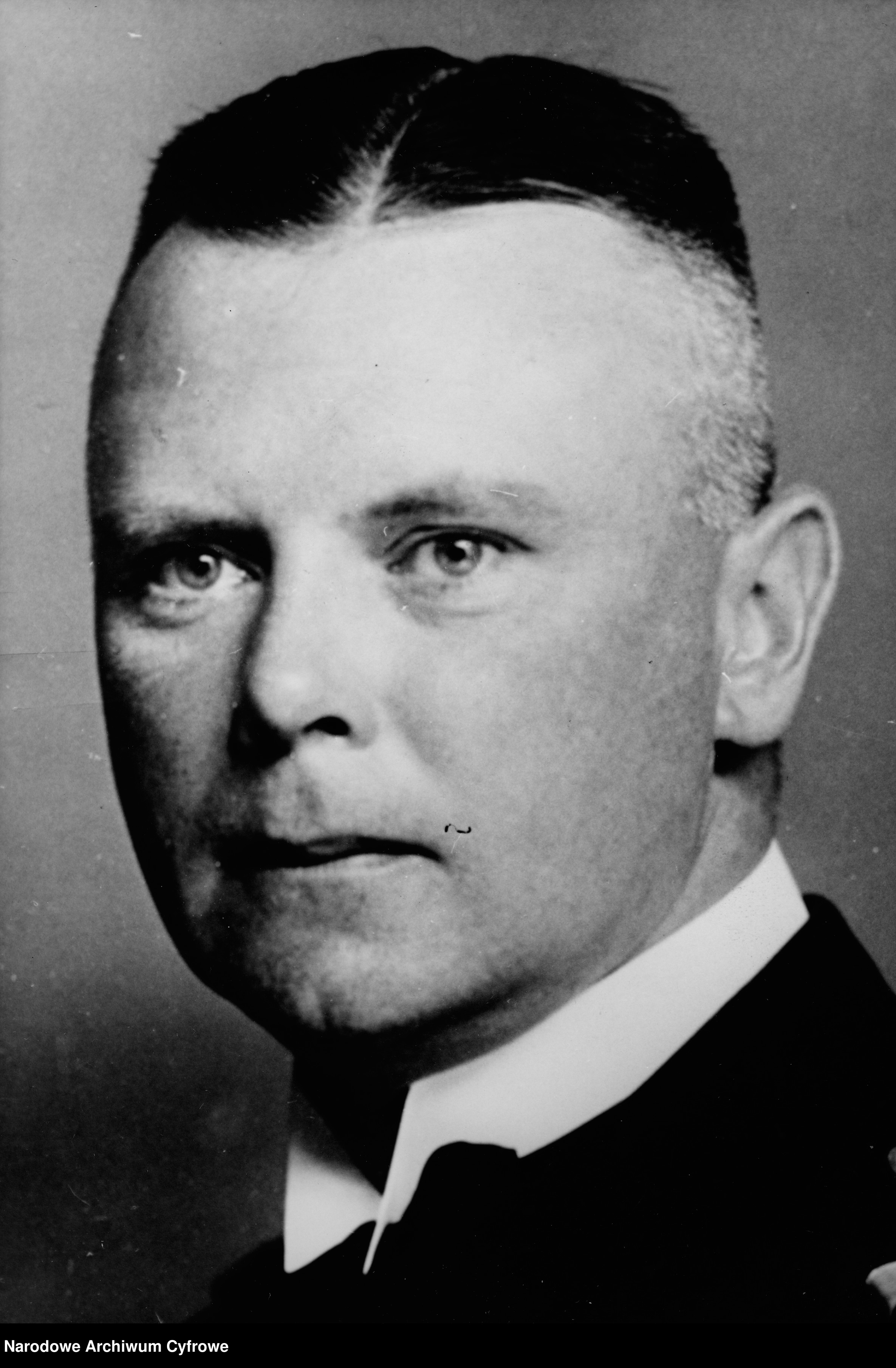
- Born: 19 October 1896; Potsdam, Berlin, German Empire
- Died: 10 April 1940 (aged 43); Wilhelm Heidkamp, off Narvik, Norway
- Military career
- Allegiance: Nazi Germany
- Branch: Kriegsmarine
- Rank: Kommodore
- Commands: Führer der Zerstörer und der Kampfgruppe Narvik
- Conflicts: World War I World War II
- Awards: Knight's Cross of the Iron Cross (posthumous)

Friedrich Bonte (19 October 1896 – 10 April 1940) was the German naval officer commanding the destroyer flotilla that transported invasion troops to Narvik during the German invasion of Norway (Operation Weserübung) in April 1940.

Bonte joined the Imperial German Navy in April 1914 and was retained in the German navy, where he had a steady career, reaching the rank of Fregattenkapitän (Commander) in April 1937. In November 1938, he was given command of the Second Destroyer Flotilla, and in April 1939 he was promoted to Kapitän zur See (Captain). On 26 October 1939, Bonte was type commander of destroyers (Führer der Zerstörer) of Nazi Germany's Kriegsmarine. He relinquished command of the torpedoboats at the end of November 1939, but held the command over the destroyers until his death. On 10 February 1940 he was promoted to Kommodore.

During the German invasion of Norway, Bonte commanded the ten destroyers carrying General Dietl's mountain troops to Narvik on 9 April 1940. On the morning of 10 April, the flotilla was attacked in Narvik fjord by British destroyers under the command of Commodore Bernard Warburton-Lee.

Bonte's flagship, the destroyer Wilhelm Heidkamp, was anchored when it was hit by a torpedo from HMS Hardy and the aft magazine exploded. Bonte and eighty of the crew perished. Bonte was posthumously awarded the Knight's Cross of the Iron Cross.

At the Viktoria Gymnasium (now Helmholtz-Gymnasium) in Potsdam, he was a classmate and friend of pianist Wilhelm Kempff's.

== Awards ==
- Iron Cross (1914) 2nd Class (1 August 1916) & 1st Class (5 March 1922)
- Cross of Honor (24 October 1935)
- Wehrmacht Long Service Award 4th to 2nd Class; 1st Class (1 April 1939)
- Clasp to the Iron Cross (1939) 2nd Class (16 October 1939); 1st Class (13 November 1939)
- Knight's Cross of the Iron Cross on 17 October 1940 (posthumously) as Kapitän zur See and Führer der Zerstörer (leader of the destroyers) and of Kampfgruppe Narvik
