= HMS Hardy (H87) =

British flotilla leader of H-class

Coordinates: 68°24′N 17°12′E

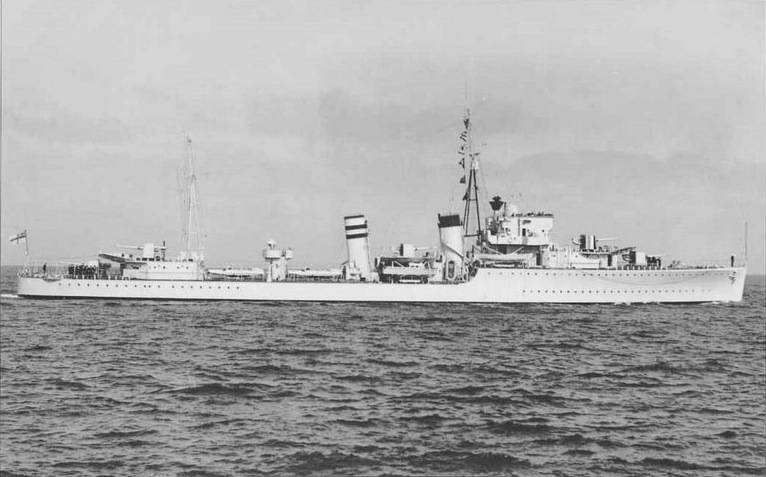

History

United Kingdom
- Name: HMS Hardy
- Ordered: 12 December 1934
- Builder: Cammell Laird and Company at Birkenhead
- Cost: £278,482
- Laid down: 30 May 1935
- Launched: 7 April 1936
- Commissioned: 11 December 1936
- Fate: Beached, 10 April 1940. Later capsized and became a total loss.

General characteristics
- Displacement: 1,455 long tons (1,478 t) (standard); 2,053 long tons (2,086 t) (deep load)
- Length: 337 ft (102.7 m)
- Beam: 34 ft (10.4 m)
- Draught: 12 ft 9 in (3.9 m)
- Installed power: 38,000 shp (28,000 kW)
- Propulsion: 2 shafts, Parsons geared steam turbines; 3 Admiralty 3-drum water-tube boilers
- Speed: 36 knots (67 km/h; 41 mph)
- Range: 5,530 nmi (10,240 km; 6,360 mi) at 15 knots (28 km/h; 17 mph)
- Complement: 175
- Sensors & processing systems: ASDIC
- Armament: 5 × 1 - QF 4.7-inch (120 mm) Mk IX guns; 2 × 4 - .50-inch machine guns; 2 × 4 - 21 inch (533 mm) torpedo tubes; 20 × depth charges, 1 rail and 2 throwers

HMS Hardy was the flotilla leader for the H-class destroyers, built for the Royal Navy in the mid-1930s. During the Spanish Civil War of 1936–1939 the ship spent considerable time in Spanish waters, enforcing the arms blockade imposed by Britain and France on both sides of the conflict. Hardy was transferred to Freetown, Sierra Leone, in October 1939 to hunt for German commerce raiders in the South Atlantic with Force K. After returning to the United Kingdom in early 1940, the ship became flagship of the 2nd Destroyer Flotilla assigned to the Home Fleet. During the Norwegian campaign of 1940, Hardy participated in the First Battle of Narvik where she sank one German destroyer. As the British ships were withdrawing, they were discovered by two other German destroyers that so badly damaged Hardy that she had to be run aground to stop her from sinking. The ship was lifted by a rising tide and eventually capsized.

== Description ==
Hardy displaced 1,455 long tons (1,478 t) at standard load and 2,053 long tons (2,086 t) at deep load. The ship had an overall length of 337 feet (102.7 m), a beam of 34 feet (10.4 m) and a draught of 12 feet 9 inches (3.9 m). She was powered by Parsons geared steam turbines, driving two shafts, which developed a total of 38,000 shaft horsepower (28,000 kW) and gave a maximum speed of 36 knots (67 km/h; 41 mph). Steam for the turbines was provided by three Admiralty 3-drum water-tube boilers. Hardy carried a maximum of 470 long tons (480 t) of fuel oil that gave her a range of 5,530 nautical miles (10,240 km; 6,360 mi) at 15 knots (28 km/h; 17 mph). The ship's complement was 175 officers and men.

The ship mounted five 45-calibre 4.7-inch (120 mm) Mark IX guns in single mounts. For anti-aircraft (AA) defence, Hardy had two quadruple Mark I mounts for the 0.5 inch Vickers Mark III machine gun. She was fitted with two above-water quadruple torpedo tube mounts for 21-inch (533 mm) torpedoes. One depth charge rail and two throwers were fitted; 20 depth charges were carried originally, but this was increased to 35 shortly after the war began.

== Service ==
Hardy was laid down by Cammell Laird and Company at Birkenhead on 30 May 1935, launched on 7 April 1936 and commissioned on 11 December 1936. Excluding government-furnished equipment like the armament, the ship cost £278,482. The ship was assigned to the 2nd Destroyer Flotilla of the Mediterranean Fleet upon commissioning. Hardy patrolled Spanish waters from 1937 through 1939 during the Spanish Civil War enforcing the policies of the Non-Intervention Committee. After the destroyer HMS Hunter struck a mine off Almeria on 13 May 1937, Hardy stood by in case Hunter needed further assistance. Hardy was berthed in Palma, Majorca, on 23 May 1937 when that port was bombed by the Spanish Republican Air Force, but was not damaged. After the end of the Spanish Civil War in 1939, she began a refit in Devonport Dockyard between 2 June and 29 July. The ship was in Malta when World War II began in September.

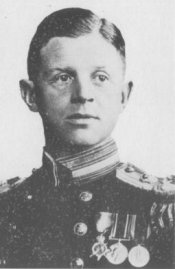
Captain Warburton-Lee

In October Hardy (pennant no. H87) was transferred to Freetown, Sierra Leone, to hunt for German commerce raiders in the South Atlantic with Force K. The ship and her half-sisters HMS Hostile, HMS Hereward, and HMS Hasty rendezvoused with the battlecruiser HMS Renown, the aircraft carrier HMS Ark Royal, and the light cruiser HMS Neptune on 17 December. They refuelled in Rio de Janeiro, Brazil before proceeding to the estuary of the River Plate in case the damaged German pocket battleship Admiral Graf Spee attempted to escape from Montevideo, Uruguay, where she had taken refuge after losing the Battle of the River Plate. She was given a brief overhaul at Devonport between 25 January and 12 February 1940 and was then transferred to Greenock, Scotland for convoy escort duties. The ship rejoined the 2nd Destroyer Flotilla of the Home Fleet in Scapa Flow on 9 March and became its flagship.

On 6 April Hardy and the rest of the 2nd Destroyer Flotilla escorted the four destroyer minelayers of the 20th Destroyer Flotilla as they sailed to implement Operation Wilfred, an operation to lay mines in the Vestfjord to prevent the shipment of Swedish iron ore from Narvik to Germany. The mines were laid on the early morning of 8 April, before the Germans began their invasion, and the destroyers then joined the battlecruiser HMS Renown and her escorts.

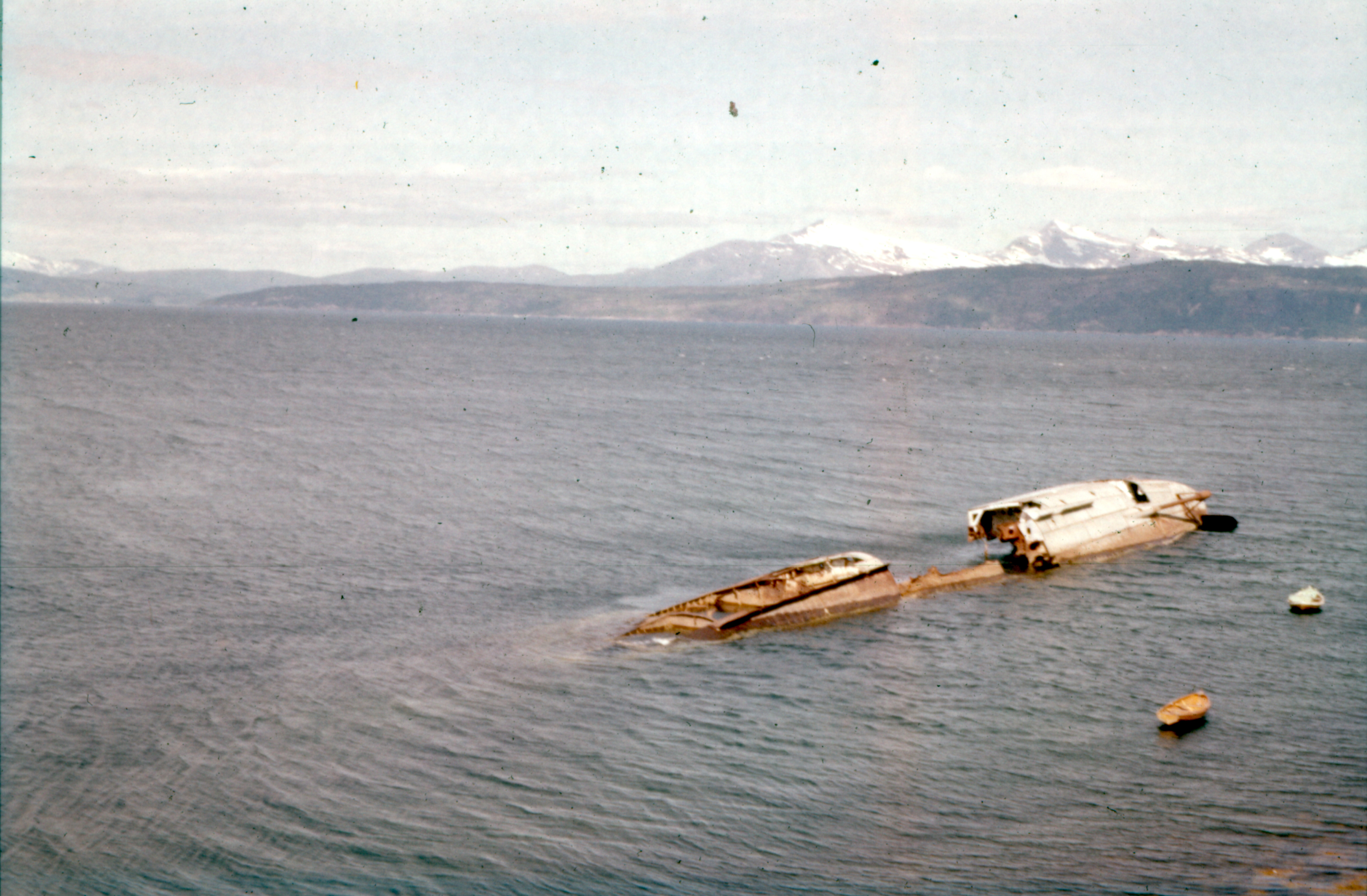
The wreckage of Hardy photographed in July 1962

The Admiralty ordered Captain Warburton-Lee to attack German shipping in Narvik, Norway, on 9 April. The following morning Hardy led four of her half-sisters down Ofotfjord in a surprise dawn attack on Narvik harbour during a blinding snowstorm. A torpedo from Hardy blew off the stern of the German flagship, Z21 Wilhelm Heidkamp, and killed the German flotilla commander, Commodore Friedrich Bonte. Heidkamp sank the next day. Another torpedo hit a merchant ship in the stern. A second salvo of four torpedoes was fired at two other German destroyers, but missed and badly damaged the ore docks. After regrouping, Captain Warburton-Lee led another attack on the harbour later that morning, but inflicted little additional damage due to poor visibility.

As the British destroyers completed their second attack, they were engaged by three more German destroyers. The British destroyers attempted to withdraw to the west, but were pursued by the German ships. Two additional German destroyers crossed the T of the British ships and quickly knocked out Hardy's forward guns. More hits to the ship's bridge and superstructure set her on fire, mortally wounded Captain Warburton-Lee and killed or wounded all of the other officers on the bridge except Paymaster Lieutenant G.H. Stanning, the Captain's Secretary. Although badly wounded, he took command and after several more hits disabled her boilers ordered her run aground at Vidrek. The First Lieutenant, who had not been present on the bridge, assumed command and ordered the ship abandoned. Some of the crew delayed doing so until the last torpedo was fruitlessly fired at a German ship and No. 4 gun fired until it was out of ammunition.

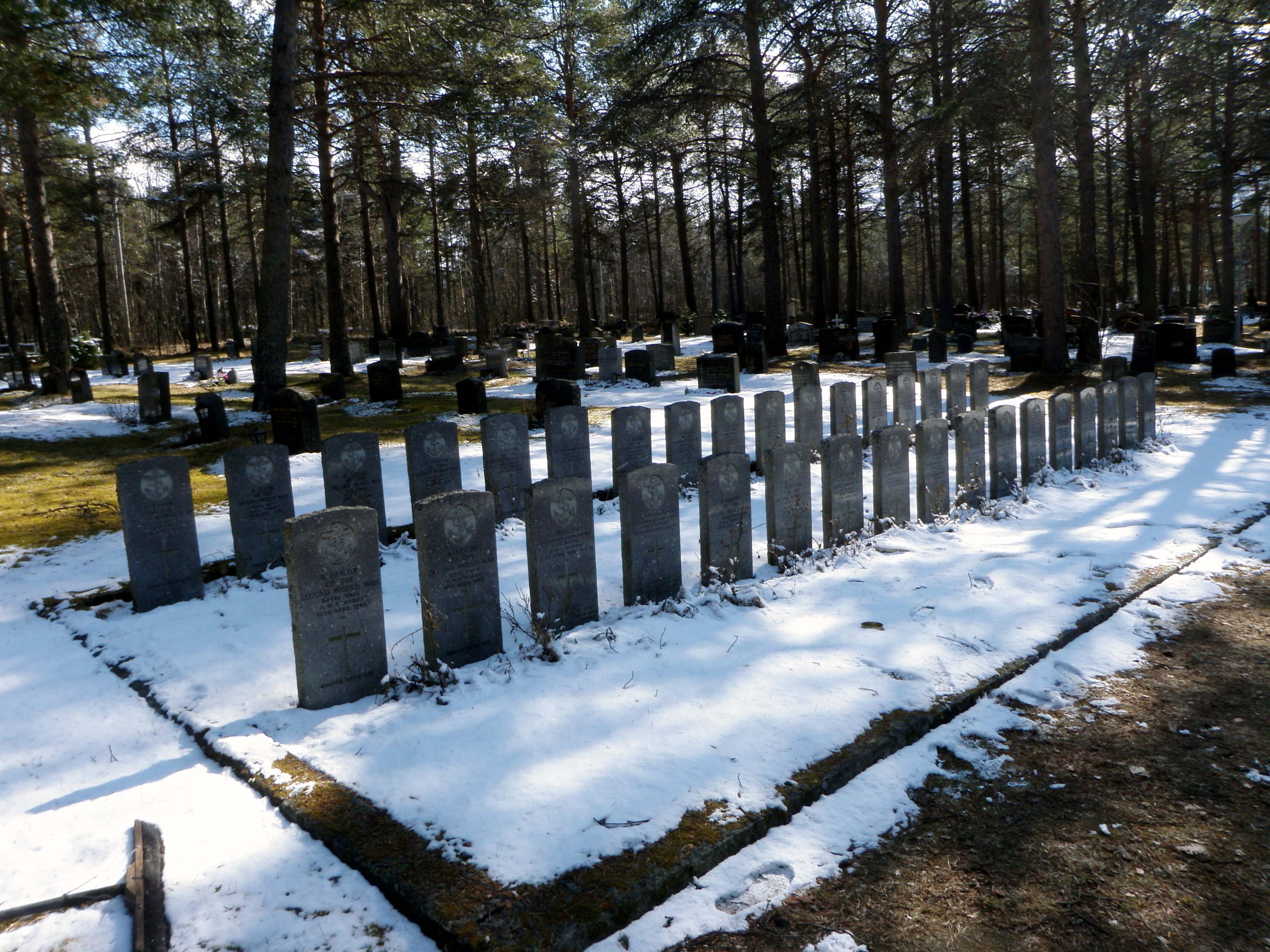
Thirty-two of the casualties of the sinking of HMS Hardy, all unidentified, are interred at the Commonwealth War Graves section of Håkvik cemetery in Narvik, alongside two identified casualties from HMS Hunter

Captain Warburton-Lee was brought ashore but died after an hour from his head wounds. 139 other men managed to get ashore, although 26 were seriously wounded. Captain Warburton-Lee was posthumously awarded the Victoria Cross. Hardy was lifted off the beach at high tide and drifted to the head of Skjomen fjord where she capsized in shallow waters. The wreck was still visible as late as 1963.
