= HMS Hostile =

H-class destroyer

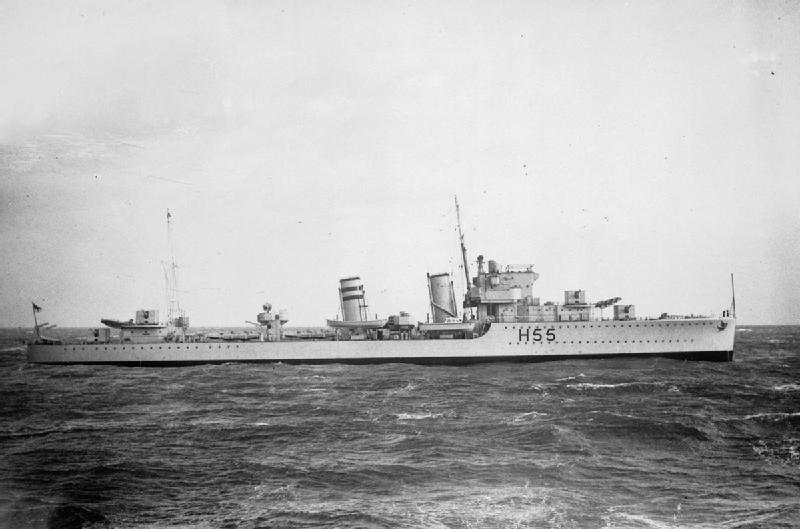
- HMS Hostile underway on completion, October 1936

History

United Kingdom
- Name: HMS Hostile
- Ordered: 13 December 1934
- Builder: Scotts Shipbuilding & Engineering Company, Greenock, Scotland
- Cost: £253,382
- Laid down: 27 February 1935
- Launched: 24 January 1936
- Completed: 10 September 1936
- Identification: Pennant number: H55
- Fate: Damaged by a mine off Cape Bon 23 August 1940, scuttled by HMS Hero

General characteristics (as built)
- Class & type: H-class destroyer
- Displacement: 1,350 long tons (1,370 t) (standard); 1,883 long tons (1,913 t) (deep load)
- Length: 323 ft (98.5 m)
- Beam: 33 ft (10.1 m)
- Draught: 12 ft 5 in (3.8 m)
- Installed power: 34,000 shp (25,000 kW); 3 Admiralty 3-drum boilers
- Propulsion: 2 shafts, Parsons geared steam turbines
- Speed: 36 knots (67 km/h; 41 mph)
- Range: 5,530 nmi (10,240 km; 6,360 mi) at 15 knots (28 km/h; 17 mph)
- Complement: 137 (peacetime), 146 (wartime)
- Sensors & processing systems: ASDIC
- Armament: 4 × single QF 4.7-inch (120 mm) Mk IX guns; 2 × Quadruple 0.5-inch (12.7 mm) machine guns; 2 × Quadruple 21-inch (533 mm) torpedo tubes; 20 × Depth charges, 1 rack and 2 throwers

HMS Hostile (H55) was an H-class destroyer built for the Royal Navy in the 1930s. She was the first and so far only Royal Navy ship to bear the name Hostile. During the Spanish Civil War of 1936–1939 the ship spent considerable time in Spanish waters, enforcing the arms blockade imposed by Britain and France on both sides of the conflict. She was transferred to Freetown, Sierra Leone, in October 1939 to hunt for German commerce raiders in the South Atlantic with Force K. Hostile participated in the First Battle of Narvik in April 1940 and the Battle of Calabria in July 1940. The ship was damaged by a mine off Cape Bon in the Strait of Sicily while on passage from Malta to Gibraltar on 23 August 1940. She was then scuttled by HMS Hero.

== Description ==
Hostile displaced 1,350 long tons (1,370 t) at standard load and 1,883 long tons (1,913 t) at deep load. The ship had an overall length of 323 feet (98.5 m), a beam of 33 feet (10.1 m), and a draught of 12 feet 5 inches (3.8 m). She was powered by Parsons geared steam turbines, driving two shafts, which developed a total of 34,000 shaft horsepower (25,000 kW) and gave a maximum speed of 36 knots (67 km/h; 41 mph). Steam for the turbines was provided by three Admiralty 3-drum water-tube boilers. Hostile carried a maximum of 470 long tons (480 t) of fuel oil that gave her a range of 5,530 nautical miles (10,240 km; 6,360 mi) at 15 knots (28 km/h; 17 mph). The ship's complement was 137 officers and men in peacetime.

The ship mounted four 45-calibre 4.7-inch (120 mm) Mark IX guns in single mounts. For anti-aircraft defence Hostile had two quadruple Mark I mounts for the 0.5 inch Vickers Mark III machine gun. She was fitted with two above-water quadruple torpedo tube mounts for 21-inch (533 mm) torpedoes. One depth charge rail and two throwers were fitted; 20 depth charges were originally carried, but this increased to 35 shortly after the war began.

== Service ==
Hostile was laid down by Scotts Shipbuilding & Engineering Company at Greenock, Scotland, on 27 February 1935, launched on 24 January 1936, and completed on 10 September 1936. Excluding government-furnished equipment like the armament, the ship cost £253,382. She was assigned to the 2nd Destroyer Flotilla of the Mediterranean Fleet upon commissioning. Hostile patrolled Spanish waters in 1937 during the Spanish Civil War enforcing the edicts of the Non-Intervention Committee. The ship received an overhaul at Gibraltar between 17 November and 15 December 1937. She resumed patrolling Spanish waters in 1938 and 1939. After the end of the Spanish Civil War, Hostile was refitted in Sheerness Dockyard between 31 May and 26 July 1939. She returned to the Mediterranean and was in Malta when World War II began.

In October the ship was transferred to Freetown to hunt for German commerce raiders in the South Atlantic with Force K. The ship and her half-sisters, Hardy, Hereward, and Hasty, rendezvoused with the battlecruiser Renown, the aircraft carrier Ark Royal, and the light cruiser Neptune on 17 December. They refuelled in Rio de Janeiro, Brazil, before proceeding to the estuary of the River Plate in case the damaged German pocket battleship Admiral Graf Spee attempted to escape from Montevideo, Uruguay, where she had taken refuge after losing the Battle of the River Plate. Hostile was overhauled at Chatham Dockyard between 26 January and 29 March 1940 and then rejoined the 2nd Destroyer Flotilla, now assigned to the Home Fleet. On 7 April, Hostile captured the German fishing trawler Nordland off the Lofoten Islands (69°05′N 14°30′E). During the First Battle of Narvik on 10 April the ship torpedoed merchant ships moored there (eleven German and collaterally one British, two Norwegian and two Swedish). and engaged the German destroyer Z17 Diether von Roeder and badly damaged her, hitting her at least five times. Hostile was only hit once, but the shell did little damage. She escorted her badly damaged sister ship, Hotspur, to the repair base set up at Flakstadøya in the Lofoten Islands. Hostile briefly escorted the battleship HMS Warspite before she returned to Rosyth for repairs between 27 April and 4 May. The ship briefly returned to Norwegian waters, where she again escorted Warspite, before being transferred to the Mediterranean Fleet in mid-May.

On 9 July Hostile participated in the Battle of Calabria as an escort for the heavy ships of Force C and unsuccessfully engaged Italian destroyers, suffering no damage. The ship, together with her sister, Hero, and the destroyers Nubian and Mohawk, were ordered to Gibraltar on 22 August where they were to temporarily join Force H. Hostile struck an Italian mine en route on the early morning of 23 August off Cap Bon that broke her back. The explosion killed five men and wounded three others. Mohawk took off the survivors while Hero fired two torpedoes to scuttle her.
