= HMS Hunter (H35) =

1936 H-class destroyer

Coordinates: 68°24′53″N 17°10′22″E

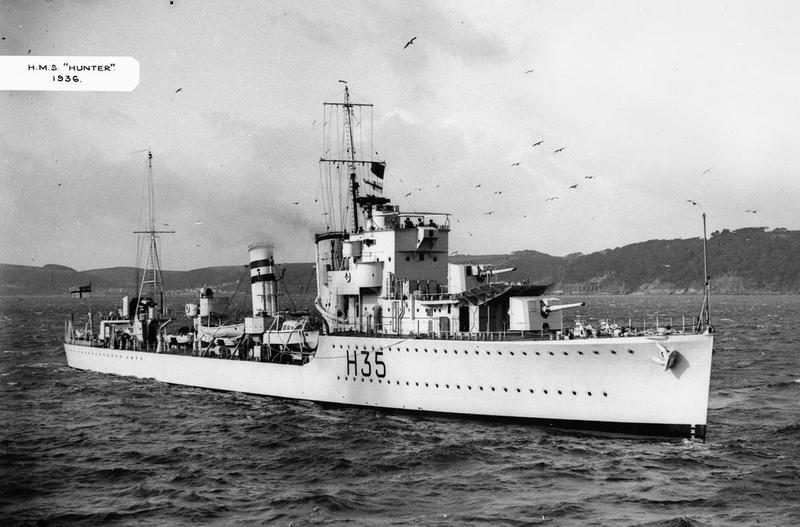

History

United Kingdom
- Name: HMS Hunter
- Ordered: 13 December 1934
- Builder: Swan Hunter, Tyne and Wear, United Kingdom
- Cost: £253,167
- Laid down: 25 March 1935
- Launched: 25 February 1936
- Completed: 30 September 1936
- Identification: Pennant number: H35
- Fate: Sunk in the First Battle of Narvik, 10 April 1940

General characteristics
- Class & type: H-class destroyer
- Displacement: 1,350 long tons (1,370 t) (standard); 1,883 long tons (1,913 t) (deep load)
- Length: 323 ft (98.5 m)
- Beam: 33 ft (10.1 m)
- Draught: 12 ft 5 in (3.8 m)
- Installed power: 3 Admiralty 3-drum boilers; 34,000 shp (25,000 kW)
- Propulsion: 2 shafts, geared steam turbines
- Speed: 36 knots (67 km/h; 41 mph)
- Range: 5,530 nmi (10,240 km; 6,360 mi) at 15 knots (28 km/h; 17 mph)
- Complement: 137 (peacetime), 146 (wartime)
- Sensors & processing systems: ASDIC
- Armament: 4 × single 4.7 in (120 mm) guns; 2 × quadruple 0.5 in (12.7 mm) AA MGs; 2 × quadruple 21 in (533 mm) torpedo tubes; 20 × depth charges, 1 rail and 2 throwers

HMS Hunter was a H-class destroyer built for the Royal Navy in the mid-1930s. During the Spanish Civil War of 1936–1939 the ship enforced the arms blockade imposed on both sides by Britain and France, until she struck a mine in May 1937. She was under repair for the next year and a half, after which she rejoined the Mediterranean Fleet. During the first few months of the Second World War, Hunter searched for German commerce raiders in the Atlantic Ocean until she was transferred back to Britain in February 1940. Returning to action in the Norwegian Campaign, she was sunk by German destroyers during the First Battle of Narvik in April 1940.

== Description ==
Hunter displaced 1,350 long tons (1,370 t) at standard load and 1,883 long tons (1,913 t) at deep load. The ship had an overall length of 323 feet (98.5 m), a beam of 33 feet (10.1 m) and a draught of 12 feet 5 inches (3.8 m). She was powered by Parsons geared steam turbines, driving two shafts, which developed a total of 34,000 shaft horsepower (25,000 kW) and gave a maximum speed of 36 knots (67 km/h; 41 mph). Steam for the turbines was provided by three Admiralty 3-drum water-tube boilers. Hunter carried a maximum of 470 long tons (480 t) of fuel oil that gave her a range of 5,530 nautical miles (10,240 km; 6,360 mi) at 15 knots (28 km/h; 17 mph). The ship's complement was 137 officers and men in peacetime, but this was increased to 146 in wartime.

The ship mounted four 45-calibre 4.7-inch (120 mm) Mark IX guns in single mounts. For anti-aircraft (AA) defence, Hunter had two quadruple Mark I mounts for the 0.5 inch Vickers Mark III machine gun. She was fitted with two above-water quadruple torpedo tube mounts for 21-inch (533 mm) torpedoes. One depth charge rail and two throwers were fitted; 20 depth charges were originally carried, but this increased to 35 shortly after the war began.

== Career ==
Ordered on 13 December 1934, Hunter was laid down by Swan Hunter & Wigham Richardson at Wallsend-on-Tyne, England, on 27 March 1935. She was launched on 25 February 1936 and completed on 30 September. Excluding government-furnished equipment such as armament, the ship cost £253,167. (Note: Adjusted for inflation to 2026 pounds, £15,665,642.) Hunter was assigned to the 2nd Destroyer Flotilla of the Mediterranean Fleet upon commissioning.

Spanish Nationalist E-boat Requeté

The destroyer patrolled Spanish waters during the Spanish Civil War, enforcing the edicts of the Non-Intervention Committee. Hunter struck a mine south of Almeria, Spain, on the afternoon of 13 May 1937. She suffered severe damage, with a heavy list, her radio wrecked and the bow flooded. Eight of her complement were killed and 24 wounded. The ship was towed clear of the minefield by the Spanish Republican destroyer Lazaga. The mines had been laid by two ex-German Spanish Nationalist E-boats, the Requeté and the Falange on the night of 6 April. Hunter was towed to Almeria by Hyperion, where she arrived in the early hours of 14 May. The light cruiser Arethusa towed her to Gibraltar, where she was temporarily repaired from 15 May to 18 August. Hunter was towed to Malta for permanent repairs in August 1937, but they were not completed until 10 November 1938. The ship was assigned to the 2nd Destroyer Flotilla once her repairs were finished and she was given a brief overhaul in Malta between 24 June and 4 July 1939. Hunter was sent to Plymouth for a more thorough refit in mid-August 1939 that lasted through 27 August.

=== Second World War ===
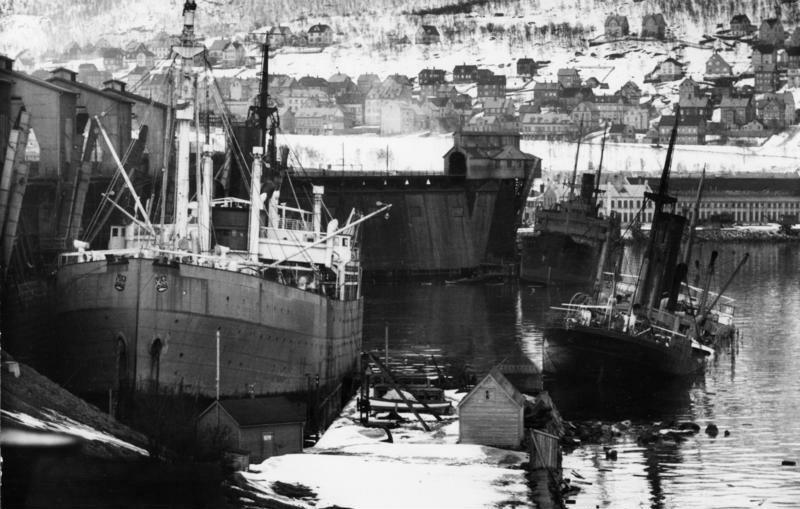
German tanker Jan Wellem with a sunk merchant vessel to the right, after the foray of the British destroyers into the fjord of Narvik

When the Second World War began on 3 September, Hunter was en route to Freetown, Sierra Leone to search for German commerce raiders, before being transferred to the North America and West Indies Station in late October. Hunter remained on that station until she was transferred to the British Isles in February 1940 and began a refit at Falmouth that lasted until 9 March. The ship rejoined the 2nd Destroyer Flotilla of the Home Fleet at Scapa Flow on 17 March. On 6 April Hunter and the rest of the 2nd Destroyer Flotilla escorted the four destroyer minelayers of the 20th Destroyer Flotilla as they sailed to implement Operation Wilfred, an operation to lay mines in the Vestfjord to prevent the transport of Swedish iron ore from Narvik to Germany. The mines were laid on the early morning of 8 April, before the Germans began their invasion, and the destroyers joined the battlecruiser Renown and her escorts.

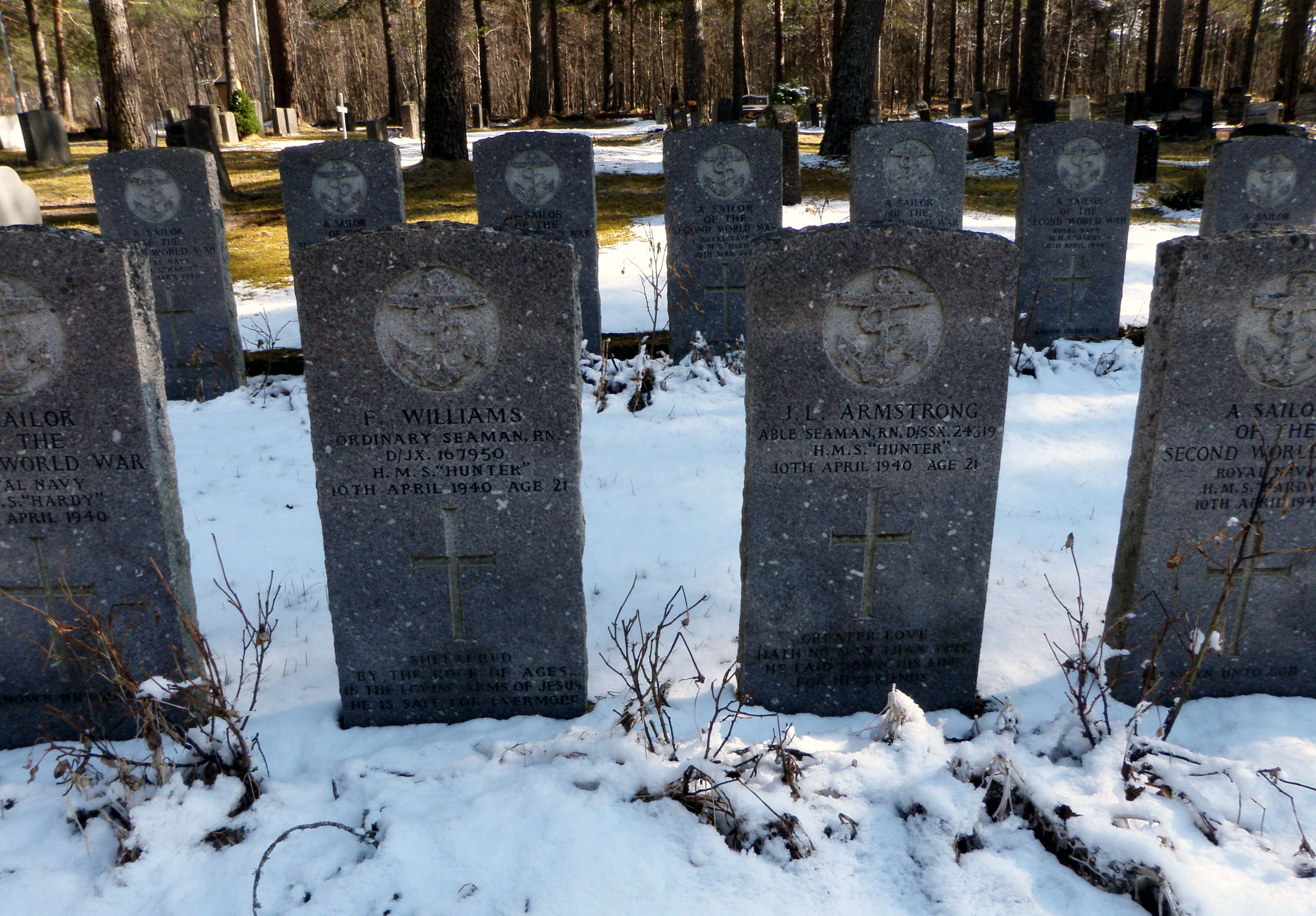
Two of the casualties of the sinking of HMS Hunter, both identified, are interred at the Commonwealth War Graves section of Håkvik cemetery in Narvik, alongside 32 unidentified casualties from HMS Hardy

During the First Battle of Narvik on 10 April 1940, Hunter and four other H-class ships of the 2nd Destroyer Flotilla attacked the German destroyers that had transported German troops to occupy Narvik in northern Norway the previous day. The flotilla leader Hardy led four of her half-sisters down Ofotfjord in a surprise dawn attack on Narvik harbour during a blinding snowstorm. Hotspur and Hostile were initially left at the entrance, but Hunter followed Hardy into the harbour and fired all eight of her torpedoes into the mass of shipping. One torpedo hit the German destroyer Z22 Anton Schmitt in the forward engine room, followed by one of Hunter's 4.7-inch shells. As the British ships were withdrawing, they encountered five German destroyers at close range. Two of the German ships crossed the T of the British ships and quickly set Hardy on fire and forced her to run aground. Hunter eventually took the lead, but was severely damaged by the Germans, probably including one torpedo hit, and her speed dropped rapidly. Hotspur, immediately behind her, was temporarily out of control due to two hits, and rammed her from behind. When the ships managed to disengage, Hunter capsized. 107 men of the crew were killed and another five died of their wounds. The German destroyers rescued 46 men, who were released into Sweden on 13 April.

== Rediscovery ==
Reuters photo handout of HMS Hunter wreck, London, 8 March 2008

The wreck was discovered on 5 March 2008 by the Royal Norwegian Navy mine control vessel HNoMS Tyr, after being unknown for nearly 70 years, and will be marked as a war grave to commemorate the lost members of her crew. A series of coordinated memorial ceremonies were held on board British and Norwegian warships on Saturday 8 March 2008, honouring all those who died during the battles of Narvik. Over a thousand NATO personnel took part, including British and Norwegian sailors, Royal Marines and soldiers. Led by HMS Albion, the UK's Fleet Amphibious Flagship, five warships steamed in line past the spot where the ship lies, marked for the occasion by Tyr. Hunter's final resting place was marked with wreaths cast into the sea.
