= German World War II destroyers =

Destroyer classes of the Kriegsmarine during World War II

At the outbreak of the Second World War Nazi Germany's Kriegsmarine had 21 destroyers (German: Zerstörer) in service, while another one was just being completed. These 22 vessels – comprising 3 classes (Type 34, 34A and 36) – had all been built in the 1930s, making them modern vessels (no destroyers remained in German hands following the close of the First World War). (Note: By comparison, the Royal Navy – with its global commitments – had 173 destroyers of all types both modern and older and another 52 on the way.) Including that final pre-war vessel, a further 19 were brought into service during the war and more were captured from opposing navies, including the Italian Navy (Regia Marina) after the Italian Armistice with the Allies in 1943.

German destroyer classes were generally known by the year of their design. Because of their size, use and weaponry, some vessels classified as "fleet torpedo boats", Flottentorpedoboot, are also described as destroyers. During World War II, destroyers were administratively grouped into one of several destroyer flotillas.

Class general characteristics are taken from the first of each class, and may differ slightly for individual ships, particularly when they were refitted. Post-war, some surviving ships had significant changes to armament.

== Zerstörer 1934 ==
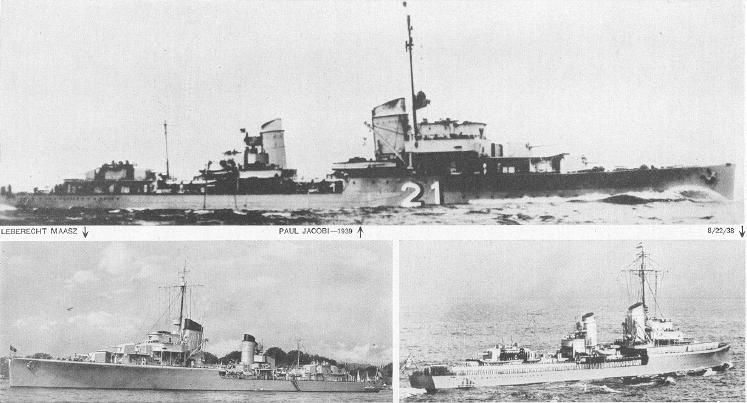
- Zerstörer 1934

Class overview
- Builders: Deutsche Werke, Kiel
- Built: 1934–1935
- In commission: 1937–1947
- Completed: 4
- Lost: 3
- Scrapped: 1

General characteristics
- Class & type: Zerstörer 1934
- Displacement: 3,155 long tons (3,206 t) maximum
- Length: 119 m (390 ft 5 in) o/a; 114 m (374 ft) w/l
- Beam: 11.30 m (37 ft 1 in)
- Draught: 4.23 m (13 ft 11 in)
- Propulsion: 2 × Wagner geared turbines, 70,000 PS (51,000 kW; 69,000 shp); 2 shafts
- Speed: 36 knots (67 km/h; 41 mph)
- Range: 1,900 nmi (3,500 km; 2,200 mi) at 19 kn (35 km/h; 22 mph)
- Complement: 325
- Armament: 5 × 12.7 cm (5 in) guns; 4 × 3.7 cm guns; 6 × 2 cm guns; 8 × 53.3 cm (21 in) torpedo tubes; 60 mines

This class of four ships was the first German destroyer class. It was designed around a new type of engine, using high pressure steam. This should have allowed higher speed, while saving space and crewmembers. The engine was however so complicated and prone to breakdown, that it forced the navy to assign even more very highly qualified personnel on board to operate and service them. As a result of stability problems, the range of the ships had to be restricted by navy regulations, allowing them to use only half of the fuel carried, to prevent the ships from becoming too light. The bow proved to be of faulty design, resulting in the ships being rather wet in heavy seas. This was fixed by rebuilding all four ship of the class before 1939. Four destroyers were laid down between October 1934 and January 1935. Only one ship survived the war. The ships were named after German navy personnel killed in World War I.

The ships were:

Z1 Leberecht Maass
Laid down: Deutsche Werke Kiel, 15 October 1934

Launched: 18 August 1935
Commissioned: 14 January 1937
Fate: sunk after friendly fire bomb hits on 22 February 1940, during Operation Wikinger
Named after Leberecht Maass

Z2 Georg Thiele
Laid down: Deutsche Werke Kiel, 25 October 1934

Launched: 18 August 1935
Commissioned: 27 February 1937
Fate: beached on 13 April 1940, after suffering serious damage during the Battles of Narvik
Named after Georg Thiele

Z3 Max Schultz
Laid down: Deutsche Werke Kiel, 2 January 1935

Launched: 30 November 1935
Commissioned: 8 April 1937
Fate: sunk as a result of friendly fire bomb hits and striking mines on 22 February 1940, during Operation Wikinger
Named after Max Schultz

Z4 Richard Beitzen
Laid down: Deutsche Werke Kiel, 7 January 1935

Launched: 30 November 1935
Commissioned: 13 May 1937
Fate: scrapped 1947
Named after Richard Beitzen

== Zerstörer 1934A ==
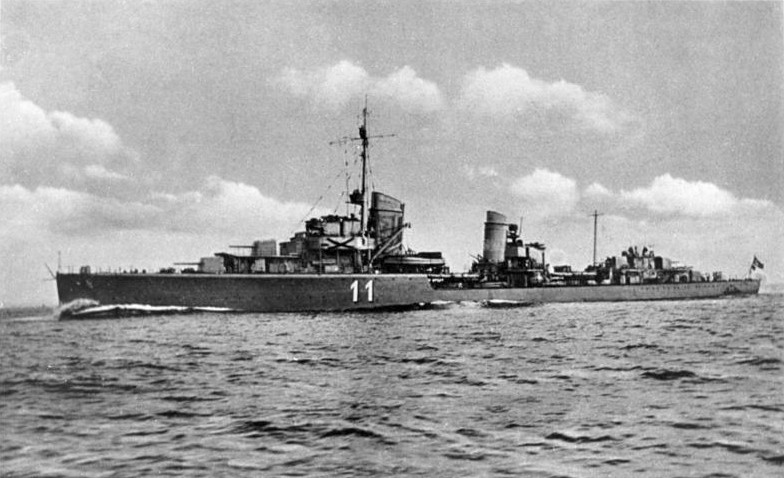
- Zerstörer 1934A.

Class overview
- Builders: AG Weser (Deschimag), Bremen; Germaniawerft, Kiel; Blohm & Voss, Hamburg
- Built: 1935–1936
- In commission: 1937–1958
- Completed: 12
- Lost: 7

General characteristics
- Class & type: Type 1934A-class destroyer
- Displacement: 2,223 metric tons (2,188 long tons)
- Length: 119 m (390 ft 5 in) o/a; 114 m (374 ft) w/l
- Beam: 11.30 m (37 ft 1 in)
- Draft: 4.23 m (13 ft 11 in)
- Installed power: 70,000 PS (51,000 kW; 69,000 shp)
- Propulsion: 2 shafts, 2 × Wagner geared steam turbines; 6 × water-tube boilers
- Speed: 36 knots (67 km/h; 41 mph)
- Range: 2,040 nmi (3,780 km; 2,350 mi) at 19 knots (35 km/h; 22 mph)
- Complement: 325
- Armament: 5 × 12.7 cm (5 in) guns; 4 (later 14) × 3.7 cm guns; 6 (later 10) × 2 cm guns; 8 × 53.3 cm (21 in) torpedo tubes; 60 mines

Twelve destroyers laid down between July and November 1935. They were only slightly modified from the design of the preceding 1934 class and continued their predecessors' limited endurance and magazine capacity – factors which contributed to the heavy German losses in the Second Battle of Narvik. Five survived the war.

Z5 Paul Jacobi
Laid down: AG Weser (Deschimag), Bremen, 15 July 1935

Launched: 24 March 1936
Commissioned: 29 June 1937
Fate: Transferred to France as war reparation Desaix, scrapped 1958
Named after Paul Jacobi

Z6 Theodor Riedel
Laid down: AG Weser (Deschimag), Bremen, 18 July 1935

Launched: 22 April 1936
Commissioned: 2 July 1937
Fate: Transferred to France as the Kleber, scrapped 1958
Named after Theodor Riedel

Z7 Hermann Schoemann
Laid down: AG Weser (Deschimag), Bremen, 7 September 1935

Launched: 16 July 1936
Commissioned: 9 September 1937
Fate: sunk 2 May 1942 by the British cruiser Edinburgh
Named after Hermann Schoemann

Z8 Bruno Heinemann
Laid down: AG Weser (Deschimag), Bremen, 14 January 1936

Launched: 15 September 1936
Commissioned: 8 January 1938
Fate: sunk 25 January 1942 by a mine near Calais
Named after Bruno Heinemann, killed during the Wilhelmshaven mutiny

Z9 Wolfgang Zenker
Laid down: Germaniawerft Kiel, 23 March 1935

Launched: 27 March 1936
Commissioned: 2 July 1938
Fate: scuttled on 13 April 1940
Named after Wolfgang Zenker, killed during the Wilhelmshaven mutiny

Z10 Hans Lody
Laid down: Germaniawerft Kiel, 1 April 1935

Launched: 14 May 1936
Commissioned: 13 September 1938
Fate: Taken over by Great Britain after the war and used as a trials ship, scrapped 1946–1949
Named after Carl Hans Lody, unusually not a captain of a vessel but had been spying in Britain.

Z11 Bernd von Arnim
Laid down: Germaniawerft Kiel, 26 April 1935

Launched: 8 July 1936
Commissioned: 6 December 1938
Fate: scuttled on 13 April 1940
Named after Bernd von Arnim

Z12 Erich Giese
Laid down: Germaniawerft Kiel, 3 May 1935

Launched: 12 March 1937
Commissioned: 4 March 1939
Fate: sunk 13 April 1940
Named after Erich Giese

Z13 Erich Koellner
Laid down: Germaniawerft Kiel, 12 October 1935

Launched: 18 March 1937
Commissioned: 28 March 1939
Fate: sunk 13 April 1940
Named after Erich Koellner

Z14 Friedrich Ihn
Laid down: Blohm & Voss Hamburg, 30 March 1935

Launched: 5 November 1935
Commissioned: 6 April 1938
Fate: Transferred to the Soviet Union, served in the Baltic Fleet as the Prytkiy (Прыткий) scrapped 1952
Named after Friedrich Ihn

Z15 Erich Steinbrinck
Laid down: Blohm & Voss Hamburg, 30 March 1935

Launched: 24 September 1936
Commissioned: 31 May 1938
Fate: Transferred to the Soviet Union, served in the Baltic Fleet as the Pylkiy (Пылкий) scrapped 1958
Named after Erich Steinbrinck

Z16 Friedrich Eckoldt
Laid down: Blohm & Voss Hamburg, 14 November 1935

Launched: 21 March 1937
Commissioned: 28 July 1938
Fate: sunk 31 December 1942 by HMS Sheffield during battle of the Barents Sea
Named after Friedrich Eckoldt

== Zerstörer 1936 ==
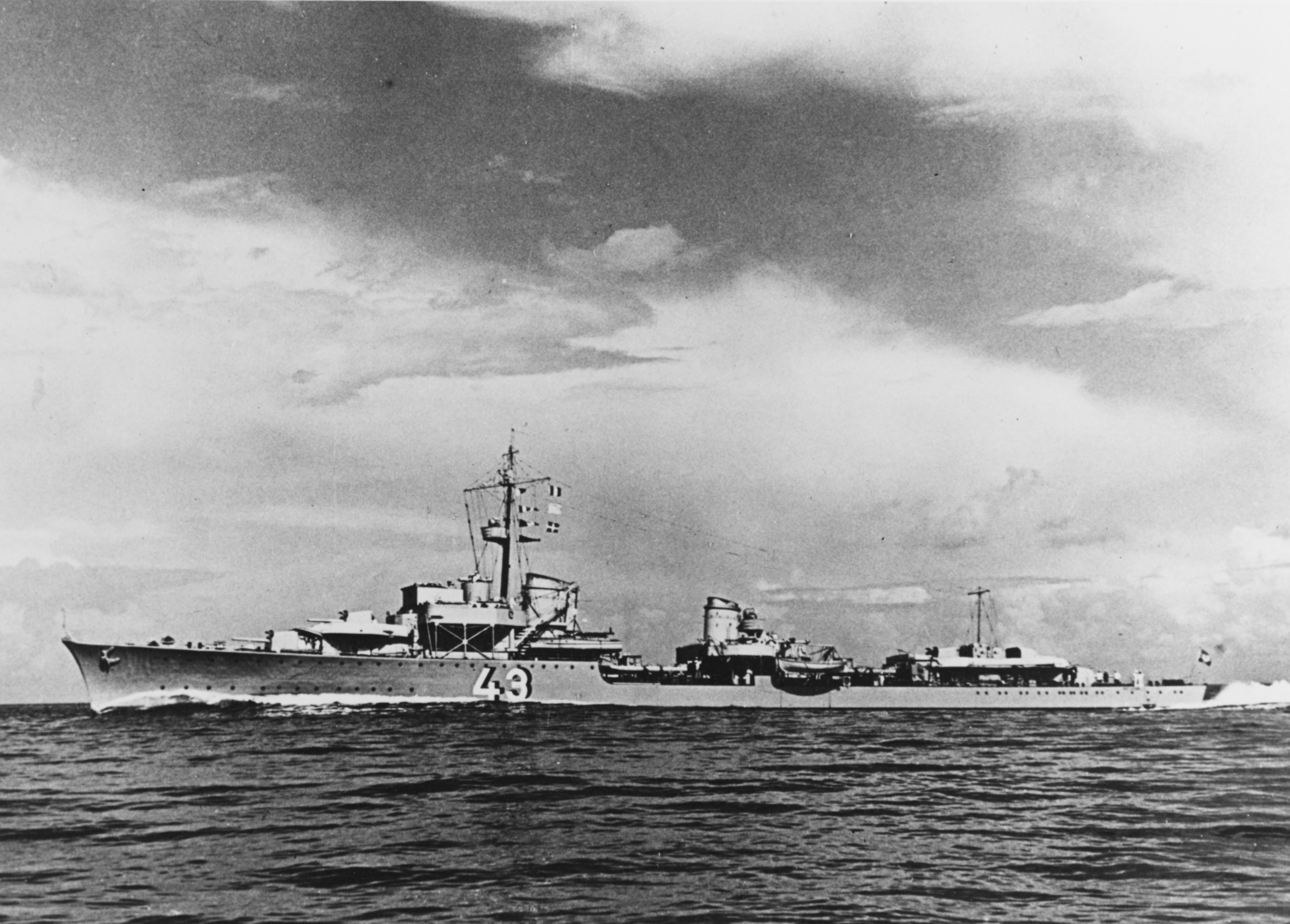
- Zerstörer 1936.

Class overview
- Builders: DeSchiMAG
- Operators: Kriegsmarine; Soviet Navy
- Preceded by: Type 1934A class
- Succeeded by: Type 1936A class
- Built: 1936–1939
- In service: 1938–1956
- In commission: 1938–1949
- Planned: 26
- Completed: 6
- Lost: 5
- Scrapped: 1

General characteristics
- Class & type: Type 1936-class destroyer
- Displacement: 2,806 tonnes (2,762 long tons) (standard)
- Length: 123.40–125.10 meters (404 ft 10 in – 410 ft 5 in) o/a
- Beam: 11.75 m (38 ft 7 in)
- Draft: 4.50 m (14 ft 9 in)
- Installed power: 70,000 PS (51,000 kW; 69,000 shp)
- Propulsion: 2 shafts; 2 × Wagner geared steam turbine sets; 6 × Wagner water-tube boilers
- Speed: 36 knots (67 km/h; 41 mph)
- Range: 2,090 nmi (3,870 km; 2,410 mi) at 19 knots (35 km/h; 22 mph)
- Complement: 323
- Armament: 5 × 1 – 12.7 cm (5.0 in) guns; 2 × 2 – 3.7 cm guns; 7 × 1 – 2 cm guns; 2 × 4 – 53.3 cm (21 in) torpedo tubes; 60 mines

These 6 ships (of 26 planned) ordered under the 1935 Program were improved and enlarged versions of the 1934 and 1934A classes. Most of the serious faults of the earlier ships had been resolved: engine reliability and the structural integrity was much improved and they were much better seagoing ships, shipping less water through an improvement in the design of the bows. Despite this, five of this newer type were also lost at Narvik in April 1940.

Z17 Diether von Roeder
Laid down: DeSchiMAG Bremen, 9 September 1936

Launched: 19 August 1937
Commissioned: 29 August 1938
Fate: sunk 13 April 1940 (Narvik)
Named after Diether von Roeder

Z18 Hans Lüdemann
Laid down: DeSchiMAG Bremen, 9 September 1936

Launched: 1 December 1937
Commissioned: 8 October 1938
Fate: scuttled on 13 April 1940
Named after Hans Lüdemann

Z19 Hermann Künne
Laid down: DeSchiMAG Bremen, 5 October 1936

Launched: 22 December 1937
Commissioned: 12 January 1939
Fate: beached on 13 April 1940
Named after Hermann Künne

Z20 Karl Galster
Laid down: DeSchiMAG Bremen, 14 September 1937

Launched: 15 June 1938
Commissioned: 21 March 1939
Fate: Transferred to the Soviet Union, served in the Baltic Fleet as the Prochnyi (Прочный) scrapped 1956
Named after Karl Galster

Z21 Wilhelm Heidkamp
Laid down: DeSchiMAG Bremen, 15 December 1937

Launched: 20 August 1938
Commissioned: 10 June 1939
Fate: sunk on 10 April 1940
Named after Wilhelm Heidkamp

Z22 Anton Schmitt
Laid down: DeSchiMAG Bremen, 3 January 1938

Launched: 20 September 1938
Commissioned: 24 September 1939
Fate: sunk on 10 April 1940
Named after Anton Schmitt

== Zerstörer 1936A "Narvik" ==
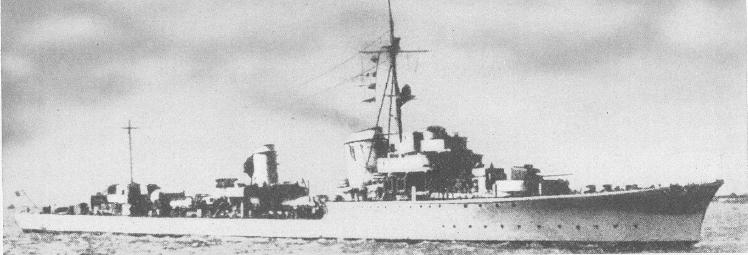

Class overview
- Builders: DeSchiMAG
- Built: 1938–1941
- In commission: 1940–1958
- Completed: 8
- Lost: 4

General characteristics
- Class & type: Zerstörer 1936A (Narvik-class)
- Displacement: 3,605 long tons (3,663 t) maximum
- Length: 127 m (416 ft 8 in) o/a; 121.90 m (399 ft 11 in) w/l
- Beam: 12 m (39 ft 4 in)
- Draught: 4.65 m (15 ft 3 in)
- Propulsion: 2 × Wagner geared turbines, 70,000 shp; 2 shafts
- Speed: 37.5 knots (69.5 km/h; 43.2 mph)
- Range: 2,180 nmi (4,040 km; 2,510 mi) at 19 knots (35 km/h; 22 mph)
- Complement: 330
- Armament: 4 or 5 × 15 cm (5.9 in) guns; 4 (later 10) × 3.7 cm guns; 8 (later 20) × 2 cm guns; 8 × 53.3 cm (21 in) torpedo tubes; 60 mines; 4 × depth charge launchers

Eight destroyers intended to carry new 150 mm (5.9 inch) guns in single turrets with a twin turret at the bow. The twin mountings were not ready in time and so singles were first used, and the twins fitted later. Anti-aircraft armament was substantially improved.

Despite reusing earlier ship designs as a basis, with modifications to improve seaworthiness, the ships were wet in heavy seas, especially fitted with heavy turrets. After much effort, the problem was traced to a newly designed stern. However, this problem was somewhat offset by the fact that the twin mount was fully enclosed and had a high maximum elevation, allowing limited use against aircraft.

These ships reverted to the traditional German practice of giving torpedo ships numbers rather than names. Four survived the war.

Z23
Laid down: DeSchiMAG Bremen, 15 November 1938

Launched: 15 December 1939
Commissioned: 15 September 1940
Fate: scrapped after 1951

Z24
Laid down: DeSchiMAG Bremen, 2 January 1939

Launched: 7 March 1940
Commissioned: 26 October 1940
Fate: sunk 25 August 1944

Z25
Laid down: DeSchiMAG Bremen, 15 February 1939

Launched: 16 March 1940
Commissioned: 30 November 1940
Fate: scrapped 1961

Z26
Laid down: DeSchiMAG Bremen, 1 April 1939

Launched: 2 April 1940
Commissioned: 11 January 1941
Fate: sunk 29 March 1942 by British cruiser Trinidad and destroyers Eclipse and Fury

Z27
Laid down: DeSchiMAG Bremen, 27 December 1939

Launched: 1 August 1940
Commissioned: 26 February 1941
Fate: sunk 28 December 1943

Z28
Laid down: DeSchiMAG Bremen, 30 November 1939

Launched: 20 August 1940
Commissioned: 9 August 1941
Fate: sunk 6 March 1945

Z29
Laid down: DeSchiMAG Bremen, 21 March 1940

Launched: 15 October 1940
Commissioned: 25 June 1941
Fate: scuttled 16 December 1946

Z30
Laid down: DeSchiMAG Bremen, 15 April 1940

Launched: 8 December 1940
Commissioned: 15 November 1941
Fate: scrapped 1949

== Zerstörer 1936A (Mob) ==
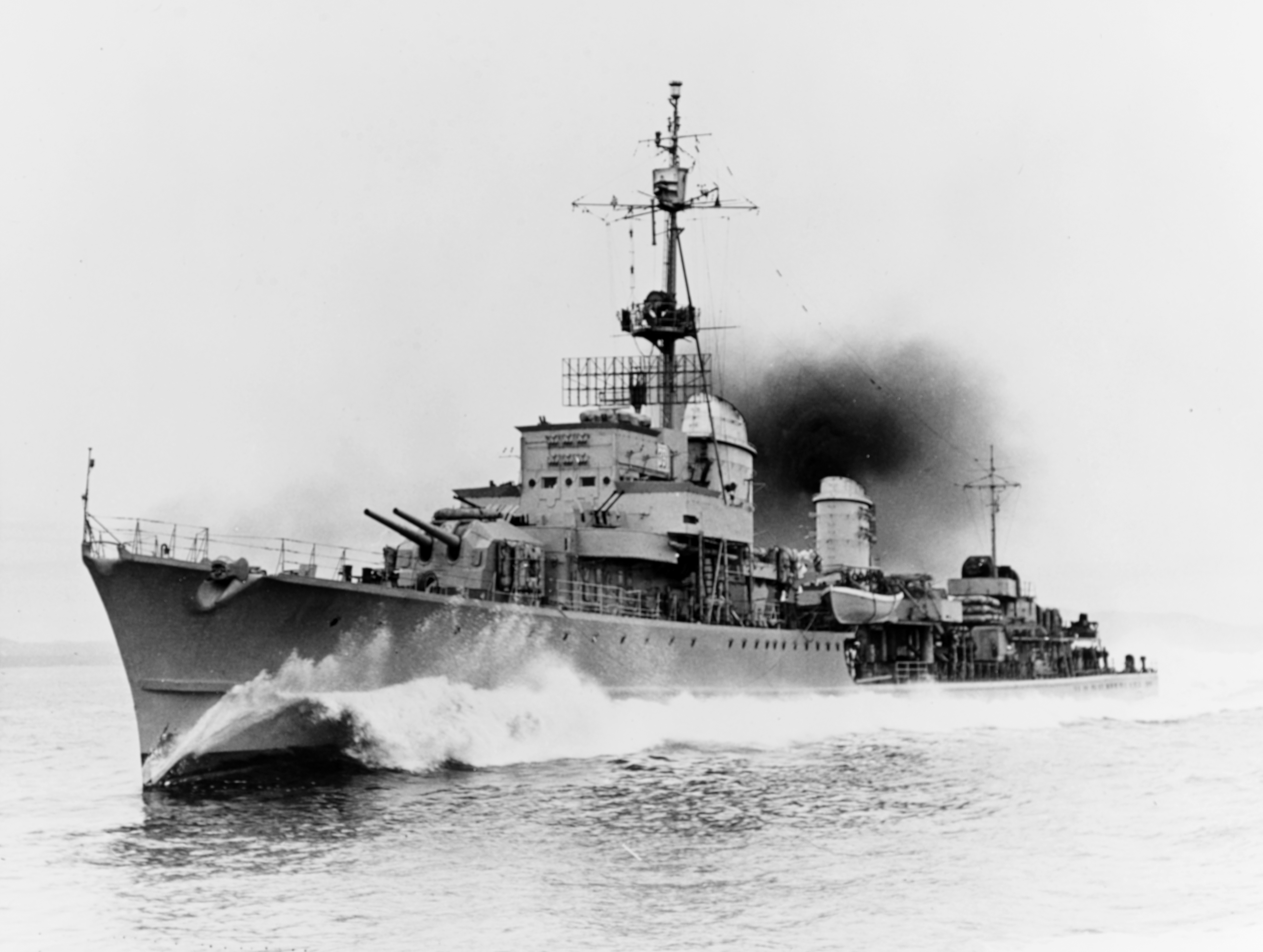
- Z39 under US flag as DD-939 in 1945

Class overview
- Builders: DeSchiMAG; Germaniawerft, Kiel
- Built: 1940–1943
- In commission: 1942–1964
- Completed: 7
- Lost: 1

General characteristics
- Class & type: Zerstörer 1936A (Mob)
- Displacement: 3,700 long tons (3,800 t) maximum
- Length: 127 m (416 ft 8 in) o/a; 121.90 m (399 ft 11 in) w/l
- Beam: 12 m (39 ft 4 in)
- Draught: 4.62 m (15 ft 2 in)
- Propulsion: 2 × Wagner geared turbines, 70,000 shp; 2 shafts
- Speed: 37.5 knots (69.5 km/h; 43.2 mph)
- Range: 2,240 nmi (4,150 km; 2,580 mi) at 19 knots (35 km/h; 22 mph)
- Complement: 330
- Armament: 5 × 15 cm (5.9 in) guns; 4 (later 14) × 3.7 cm guns; 12 (later 18) × 2 cm guns; 8 × 53.3 cm (21 in) torpedo tubes; 60 mines; 4 × depth charge launchers

When war broke out in 1939, planned new destroyer classes were cancelled and twelve additional 1936A vessels (Z.31 to Z.42, although the last three were to be cancelled) were ordered with slight modifications to speed construction and save materials. "Mob" stands for "Mobilmachung" (Mobilisation). The 150 mm twin turrets had been manufactured for planned, but never built, "O" class battlecruisers. In war service, the engines were more reliable than in earlier ships but at the end of the war, heavy corrosion was discovered.

Seven of this sub-class were built: one was sunk, another two were severely damaged and not repaired. The remaining four were war booty allocated to the Allies.

Z31
Laid down: DeSchiMAG Bremen, 1 September 1940

Launched: 15 April 1941
Commissioned: 11 April 1942
Fate: scrapped 1958

Z32
Laid down: DeSchiMAG Bremen, 1 November 1940

Launched: 15 August 1941
Commissioned: 15 September 1942
Fate: sunk 9 June 1944 (wrecked while pursued by Canadian destroyers Haida and Huron)

Z33
Laid down: DeSchiMAG Bremen, 22 December 1940

Launched: 15 September 1941
Commissioned: 6 February 1943
Fate: Transferred to the Soviet Union, served in the Baltic Fleet as the Provornyi (Проворный), sunk as target ship 1961

Z34
Laid down: DeSchiMAG Bremen, 14 January 1941

Launched: 5 May 1942
Commissioned: 5 June 1943
Fate: scuttled 26 March 1946

Z37
Laid down: Germaniawerft Kiel, 1940

Launched: 24 February 1941
Commissioned: 16 July 1942
Fate: scrapped 1949

Z38
Laid down: Germaniawerft Kiel, 1940

Launched: 5 August 1941
Commissioned: 20 March 1943
Fate: transferred to Britain at the end of the war; renamed HMS Nonsuch; scrapped 1949

Z39
Laid down: Germaniawerft Kiel, 1940

Launched: 5 August 1941
Commissioned: 21 August 1943
Fate: transferred to the US Navy at the end of the war and designated DD-939; transferred to France 1947, scrapped 1953

== Zerstörer 1936B ==
Class overview
- Builders: DeSchiMAG
- Built: 1941–1945
- In commission: 1943–1964
- Planned: 8
- Completed: 3
- Canceled: 3
- Lost: 3

General characteristics
- Class & type: Zerstörer 1936B
- Displacement: 3,540 long tons (3,600 t) maximum
- Length: 127 m (416 ft 8 in) o/a; 121.50 m (398 ft 7 in) w/l
- Beam: 12 m (39 ft 4 in)
- Draught: 4.21 m (13 ft 10 in)
- Propulsion: 2 × Wagner geared turbines, 70,000 shp; 2 shafts
- Speed: 36.5 knots (67.6 km/h; 42.0 mph)
- Range: 2,600 nmi (4,800 km; 3,000 mi) at 19 knots (35 km/h; 22 mph)
- Complement: 330
- Armament: 5 × 12.7 cm (5 in) guns; 4 (later 10) × 3.7 cm guns; 16 × 2 cm guns; 8 × 53.3 cm (21 in) torpedo tubes; 76 mines; 4 × depth charge launchers

The main armament of this class reduced back to single mounted 128 mm guns and the anti-aircraft armament was increased. The efficacy of this change was not proven in high seas as this sub-class only operated in the Baltic and coastal waters.

Eight ships to this design were ordered, but the orders for Z.40, Z.41 and Z.42 (all three ordered from Germaniawerft at Kiel) were replaced by orders for three Spähkreuzer ("scout cruisers"), to be numbered Sp.1, Sp.2 and Sp.3 respectively. Two ships (Z.44 and Z.45) were never completed, being suspended in 1944 and scuttled incomplete after the war. The three that were commissioned were all lost.

Z35
Laid down: DeSchiMAG Bremen, 6 June 1941

Launched: 2 October 1942
Commissioned: 22 September 1943
Fate: sunk 12 December 1944
mine, Gulf of Finland

Z36
Laid down: DeSchiMAG Bremen, 15 September 1941

Launched: 15 May 1943
Commissioned: 19 February 1944
Fate: sunk 12 December 1944
mine, Gulf of Finland

Z43
Laid down: DeSchiMAG Bremen, 1 May 1942

Launched: 22 September 1943
Commissioned: 24 March 1944
Fate: scuttled 3 May 1945

Z44
Laid down: DeSchiMAG Bremen, 1942

Launched: 20 January 1944
Commissioned:
Fate: scuttled incomplete 20 July 1946

Z45
Laid down: DeSchiMAG Bremen, 1942

Launched: 15 April 1944
Commissioned:
Fate: scuttled incomplete 20 July 1946

== Zerstörer 1936C ==
Five ships of this class were ordered in 1942 and 1943 (Z.46 – Z.50), all from A.G. Weser at Bremen; none were launched, just two were started – Z.46 and Z.47 – and both were bombed by Allied aircraft while under construction and were scrapped on the slipways in 1945. This design was a response to the vulnerability to air attack of early German destroyers and would have used six new 128 mm Flak 40 guns (originally designed for the Luftwaffe) as dual purpose weapons in twin mountings. The number of smaller calibre anti-aircraft guns would have also been increased.

== Zerstörer 1938A/Ac ==
In order to provide support for larger German warships operating far from their bases, the development of large ocean-going destroyers started in the late 1930s. They would have had dual power systems to enable long endurance cruises. Twenty-four of these were planned under Plan Z but were not actually ordered – the concept was developed further into the Spähkreuzer (see Type 1936B above).

== Zerstörer 1938B ==
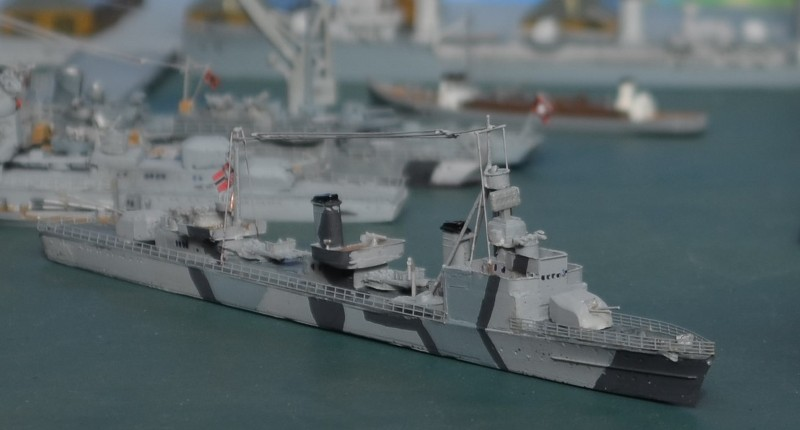
Model of the Zerstörer 1938B class

Ships of this class would have been small destroyers designed to patrol and operate in Baltic and coastal waters, but would have had quite big operational range for such purpose, and could have also been used in high seas. Twelve ships were ordered in the summer of 1939, but after the start of World War II, all were cancelled.

== Zerstörer 1942 ==
Class overview
- Builders: Deschimag, Bremen
- Planned: 1
- Completed: 0
- Lost: 1

General characteristics
- Class & type: Zerstörer 1942
- Displacement: 2,330 long tons (2,370 t) standard
- Length: 114.30 m (375.0 ft) o/a; 108 m (354 ft 4 in) w/l
- Beam: 11 m (36 ft 1 in)
- Draught: 4.37 m (14 ft 4 in)
- Propulsion: 6 × 24 cylinder MAN diesel engines, 5,700 PS (4,200 kW; 5,600 bhp); 3 shafts (4 diesels on centre shaft, 1 on each wing shaft)
- Speed: 36 knots (67 km/h; 41 mph)
- Range: 5,500 nmi (10,200 km; 6,300 mi) at 19 knots (35 km/h; 22 mph)
- Complement: 235
- Armament: 4 × 12.7 cm (5 in) guns; 8 × 3.7 cm guns; 12 × 2 cm guns; 6 × 53.3 cm (21 in) torpedo tubes; 50 mines

Experimental testbed destroyer powered by diesel engines for long-range operations. Based on design of unbuilt Type 1938B destroyer, with six diesels driving three shafts, with an estimated speed of 36 knots (67 km/h; 41 mph) and an operating radius of 5,500 nautical miles (10,200 km; 6,300 mi). One ship, Z51, was laid down in 1943 and launched in 1944, but was sunk by Allied bombers on 21 March 1945 while fitting out.

== Zerstörer 1944 ==
While Z.51 was a testbed for diesel propulsion, the Type 1944 destroyer was a production class of large, diesel powered destroyers. They were planned to have a revised armament, with six 128 mm Flak 40 dual purpose main guns, and an all-new anti-aircraft armament, with three 5.5 cm Gerät 58 intermediate calibre anti-aircraft guns and a close-in armament of 14 30 mm guns in seven twin mounts, with eight torpedo tubes.

Five of these ships (Z.52–Z.56) were ordered from A.G. Weser at Bremen and were laid down in 1943, but none were completed, being cancelled in July 1944 and broken up on the slips. A further two ships (Z.57 and Z.58) were ordered from Germaniawerft at Kiel, but were cancelled before construction started.

== Zerstörer 1945 ==
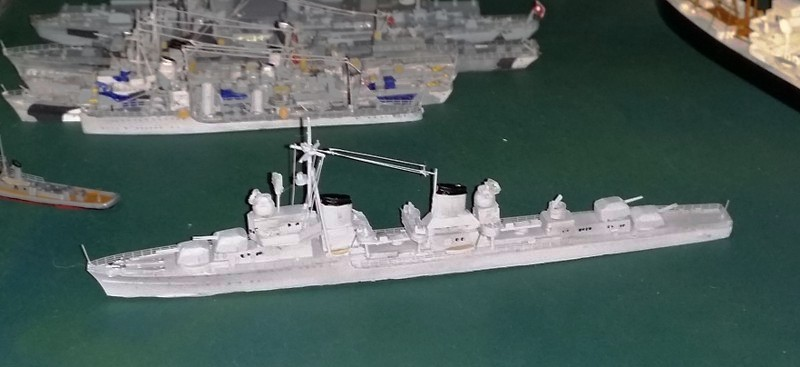
Model of the German Zerstörer Class 1945

Project for high-speed design reverting to steam-turbine propulsion. Unbuilt.

== Zerstorer 1937J ==
A project for a high-speed design with a long range.

== Destroyer sized craft ==
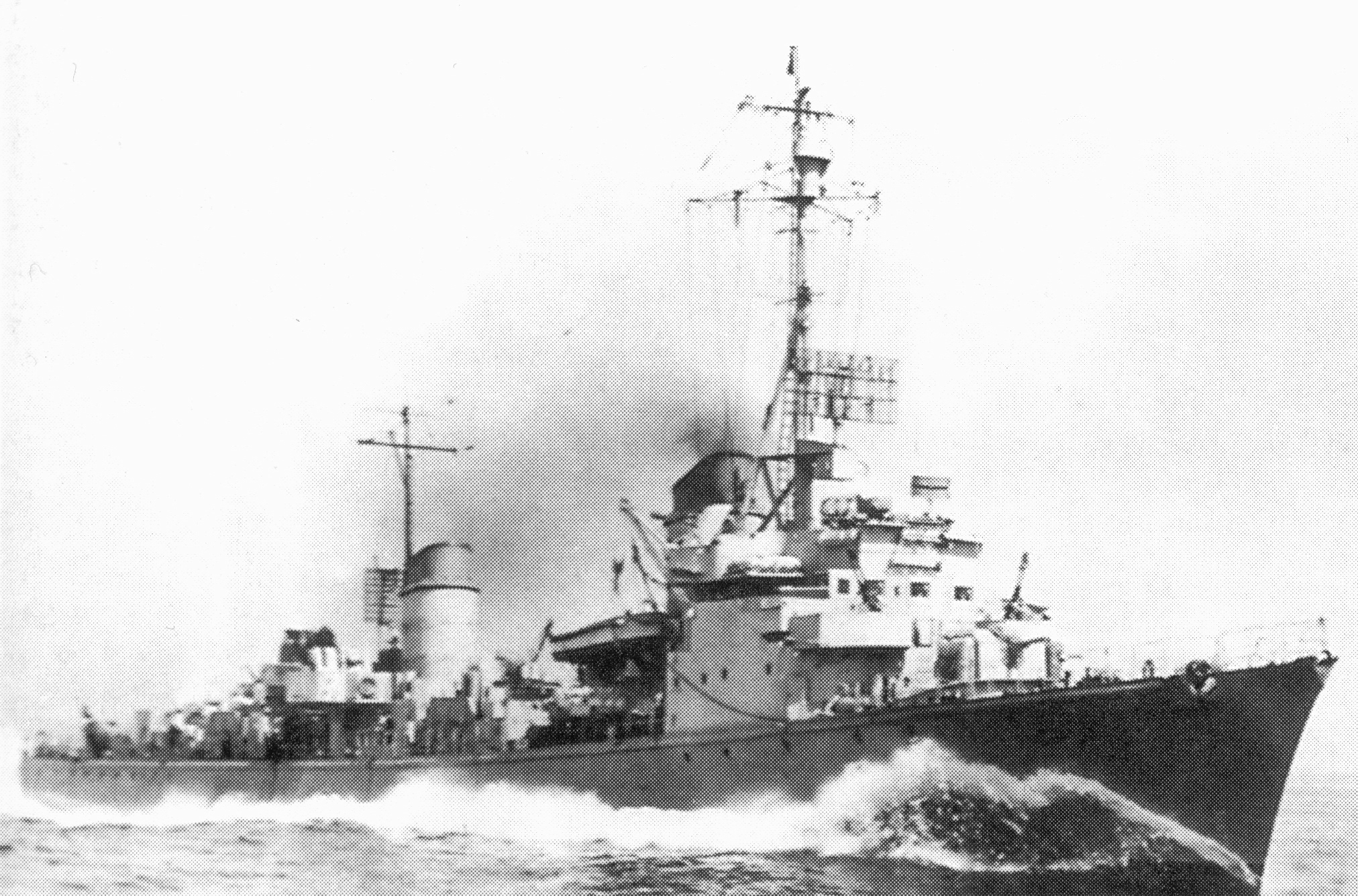

Class overview
- Name: Flottentorpedoboot 1939 (Elbing-class)
- Builders: Schichau
- In commission: 1941–1944
- Completed: 15
- Lost: 11

General characteristics
- Displacement: 1,755 long tons (1,783 t) maximum
- Length: 102.50 m (336 ft 3 in) o/a; 97 m (318 ft 3 in) w/l
- Beam: 10 m (32 ft 10 in)
- Draught: 3.22 m (10 ft 7 in)
- Propulsion: 2 × Wagner geared turbines, 32,560 shp; 2 shafts
- Speed: 32.5 knots (60.2 km/h; 37.4 mph)
- Range: 2,400 nmi (4,400 km; 2,800 mi) at 19 knots (35 km/h; 22 mph)
- Complement: 205
- Armament: 4 × 10.5 cm (4 in) guns; 4 × 3.7 cm guns; 9 × 2 cm guns; 6 × 53.3 cm (21 in) torpedo tubes; 50 mines

The Kriegsmarine had several torpedo boat classes with displacements between 1,000 and 1,300 tons (for example the Möwe-class Fleet Torpedo boats and Torpedo boat type 35). They sat in size between torpedo-equipped fast attack boats (known to the Allies as E-boats) and the destroyers. In 1939, the Germans started work on new designs that were a response to the weaknesses of earlier designs. These "Fleet Torpedo Boats" (Flottentorpedoboot) were large, 1,755 tons, and more able as escorts and for anti-aircraft defence as well as torpedo attacks and they were comparable in most respects to some of the British destroyer classes. They were all laid down during the war.

=== Flottentorpedoboot 1939 (Elbing-class) ===
The first of the fleet vessels, they were comparable in most respects – size, armament, and use – to standard British destroyer types. Fifteen were laid down between 1940 and 1942, in the Schichau shipyard in Elbing (now Elbląg) and from that the Allies referred to them as the Elbing-class.

The last was commissioned at the end of 1944; three survived the war and served in Allied navies. The ships were numbered T22 to T36.

=== Flottentorpedoboot 1940 ===
Following the capitulation of the Netherlands, Dutch shipyards were contracted to build 24 boats based on a Dutch design. Only three of these 2,600 ton vessels were launched. These three were moved to the Baltic in 1944 for work, but none were completed.

=== Flottentorpedoboot 1941 ===
This was a development of the 1939 class, with bigger engines and more anti-aircraft weapons. Fifteen were laid down or launched from 1942 but, by the end of the war, none had been completed.

=== Flottentorpedoboot 1944 ===
These were to have been ocean-going vessels, as opposed to North Sea or coastal vessels, capable of operating with the fleet, with greater range and an emphasis on anti-aircraft weaponry. Nine were ordered in March 1944; however, the order was subsequently cancelled without any building having started.

=== Torpedoboot Ausland ===
Several destroyer-sized ships were captured by the Germans and put into service as Torpedoboot Ausland.

=== Flottenbegleiter ===
These 10 fleet escort vessels of the F class were the German equivalent to the Allied destroyer escorts and frigates.

== Captured ships ==
Some destroyers were captured and used by the Germans; for full list see Torpedoboot Ausland.

=== ZH1 ===
The Dutch destroyer Hr.Ms. Gerard Callenburgh was built by RDM Rotterdam and launched on 12 October 1939. The Dutch attempted to scuttle this ship during the German invasion, but the destroyer was salvaged and completed under German control with technical guidance from Blohm & Voss. She was commissioned as the ZH1 on 11 October 1942. The Germans retained most of the Dutch armament and equipment. The ZH1 spent most of her life on trials in the Baltic, but transferred to Western France via the English Channel in November 1943. When the western allies invaded Normandy in 1944, the German destroyers based in western France attempted to interdict the invasion armada. The German squadron was intercepted by an Allied force – the 10th Destroyer Flotilla (HMS Tartar, Ashanti, Eskimo, Javelin, HMCS Haida, Huron, and ORP Błyskawica, Piorun). In the night action, ZH1 was torpedoed and sunk by Ashanti on 9 June 1944; 33 men were lost.

=== ZF2 ===
The hull of the French Le Hardi-class destroyer L'Opiniatre was captured intact and 16% complete in Bordeaux. The Kriegsmarine intended to complete her for service. Since French armament was not available, and for standardisation with the rest of the German Navy, 127 mm guns and German pattern torpedo tubes were ordered. Work proceeded tardily until all progress was abandoned in July 1943. The hull was eventually broken up on the slip

=== ZG3 (Hermes) ===
The Greek destroyer Vasilefs Georgios was captured in damaged condition after the fall of Greece, then repaired in Greece with assistance from the Germaniawerft and commissioned by the Kriegsmarine as the ZG3 or the Hermes. She was the only major Kriegsmarine surface ship in the Mediterranean Sea during World War II, and she was involved in escorting convoys to North Africa and the Aegean Islands.

Hermes detected and depth charged the Royal Navy submarine HMS Splendid off Capri, Italy, on 21 April 1943, forcing it to surrender; Splendid was scuttled by her crew. Hermes was damaged by air attacks off Tunisia. Hermes had to be scuttled in La Goulette, Tunis, on 7 May 1943.

=== The Sleipner-class Destroyers ===
Four out of six of Norway's Sleipner-class destroyers were captured following Germany's conquest of Norway. HNoMS Gyller (1938), renamed Löwe and HNoMS Odin (1939), renamed Panther were captured at Kristiansand. HNoMS Tor (1939), renamed Tiger and HNoMS Balder (1939), renamed Leopard, were captured while still under construction, and completed by the Germans. In Kriegsmarine service, they were classified as torpedo boats.

In January 1945, Löwe was one of the escorts for the MV Wilhelm Gustloff on her last voyage. When Wilhelm Gustloff was torpedoed and sunk, she stood alongside and rescued 427 of her passengers and crew. After the war, the ships were returned to Norway and given back their original names, and remained in service until the late 1950s.

=== Troll ===
The Norwegian Draug-class destroyer, HNoMS Troll was captured by the Germans in Florø on 18 May 1940. Following Norway's surrender, she had been ordered to sail to the UK with her sister, HNoMS Draug, but due to lack of crew and coal, she was unable to do so. Once placed under the German flag, she was considered too old and obsolete for military service, and was converted into a distillation and steam supply ship, having her whole superstructure removed, and was stationed at Bergen. She retained her name throughout the war. She survived the war and was returned to Norway, but her condition and age made her unfit for future service and was sold for scrap in 1949.

=== TA32 ===
The Royal Yugoslav Navy destroyer leader, KB Dubrovnik, was captured by Italy in the Bay of Kotor on 17 April 1941. She was recommissioned in the Regia Marina as Premuda, and served in the Mediterranean Sea until 1943. She was undergoing repairs in Genoa when Italy surrendered and joined the Allies. With this, she was seized by the Germans and commissioned into the Kriegsmarine as TA32. In 1944, her repairs were completed with German modifications and soon saw action shelling Allied positions along the Italian coast. While on minelaying duty off Genoa, she engaged the American destroyer, USS Gleaves (DD-423), but escaped undamaged. On 18 March 1945, while on minelaying duty off Corsica, she was engaged by 2 British destroyers in what became the Battle of the Ligurian Sea. While both her escorts were sunk, she escaped with a damaged rudder. With the Allies advancing further into Northern Italy, she was scuttled in Genoa on 24 April 1945, and her crew retreated. She was raised and broken up in 1950.

=== TA43 ===
The Royal Yugoslav Navy Beograd-class destroyer, KB Beograd, was captured by Italy in the Bay of Kotor on 17 April 1941. She was recommissioned in the Regia Marina as Sebenico, and served in the Mediterranean Sea until 1943. Following Italy's surrender and joining the Allies, she was captured by the Germans in Venice on 9 September 1943. She was then recommissioned into the Kriegsmarine as TA43. However, at the time of her capture she was damaged and not operational. While being repaired, her anti-aircraft armament was improved and reentered active service in February 1945. She operated in the northern Adriatic Sea, but saw little action other than escort work and minelaying. Sources differ on her fate. One claim is that while docked in Trieste, she was sunk by artillery fire of Yugoslav forces on 30 April 1945. Another is that she was scuttled by her crew in Trieste on 1 May 1945. She remained sunk in Trieste until 1947 when she was raised and broken up.

=== TA14 ===
The Regia Marina Turbine-class destroyer, Turbine, was captured by the Germans in Piraeus on 8 September 1943, following Italy's Armistice with the Allies. She was recommissioned as TA14 and operated in the Aegean Sea. Her anti-aircraft armament was upgraded during her time in German service. She operated as an escort ship off the Greek coast. On 19 June 1944, she was badly damaged by an explosion and sent to Salamis for repairs. While docked in Salamis, on 16 September 1944, she was sunk by American aircraft rockets before repairs were completed.

== See also ==
- List of ships of World War II
- List of ship classes of World War II

== Bibliography ==
- Gröner, Erich (1990). German Warships 1815–1945. Vol. 1: Major Surface Warships. Annapolis, Maryland: Naval Institute Press. ISBN 0-87021-790-9.
- Lenton, H.T. (1975). German Warships of the Second World War. London: Macdonald and Jane's. ISBN 0356046613.
- Rohwer, Jürgen (2005). Chronology of the War at Sea 1939–1945: The Naval History of World War Two (Third Revised ed.). Annapolis, Maryland: Naval Institute Press. ISBN 1-59114-119-2.
- Sieche, Erwin (1980). "Germany". In Chesneau, Roger (ed.). Conway's All the World's Fighting Ships 1922–1946. London: Conway Maritime Press. pp. 218–254. ISBN 0-85177-146-7.
- Whitley, M. J. (2000). Destroyers of World War Two: An International Encyclopedia. London: Cassell & Co. ISBN 1-85409-521-8.
- Whitley, M. J. (1991). German Destroyers of World War Two. Annapolis, Maryland: Naval Institute Press. ISBN 1-55750-302-8.
