= Type 1936C destroyer =

Planned class of destroyers, for the Kriegsmarine

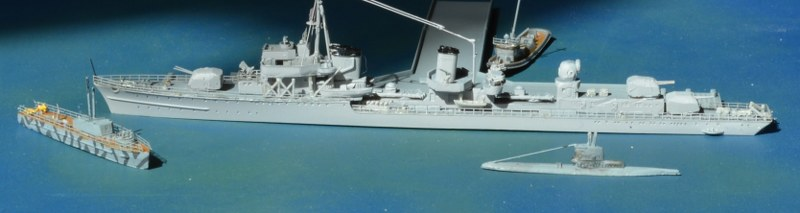
- Model of Z46, one of the Type 1936C destroyers.

Class overview
- Builders: Deschimag
- Preceded by: Type 1936B destroyers
- Succeeded by: Type 1942 destroyer
- Built: 1943–1945
- Planned: 5
- Canceled: 5

General characteristics
- Type: Destroyer
- Displacement: 2,636 t (2,594 long tons) (standard load); 3,071 t (3,022 long tons) (design load); 3,683 t (3,625 long tons) (full load)
- Length: 121.5 m (399 ft) (waterline); 126.2 m (414 ft) (overall)
- Beam: 12.2 m (40 ft)
- Draught: 3.62 m (11.9 ft) (standard load); 3.88 m (12.7 ft) (design load); 4.45 m (14.6 ft) (full load)
- Depth: 6.65 m (21.8 ft)
- Installed power: 70,000 shp (52,000 kW); 6 × Wagner steam boilers
- Propulsion: 2 × propeller shafts; 2 × steam turbines
- Speed: 37.5 knots (69.5 km/h; 43.2 mph) (top speed); 19 knots (35 km/h; 22 mph) (cruising speed)
- Range: 2,500 nmi (4,600 km; 2,900 mi) at 19 knots (35 km/h; 22 mph)
- Complement: 320
- Armament: 6 × 12.8 cm (5.0 in) Quick-firing guns; 6 × 3.7 cm (1.5 in) AA guns; 8–14 × 2 cm (0.8 in) AA guns; 2 × quadruple 53.3 cm (21.0 in) torpedo tubes; 60 × Mines; 4 × Depth-charge launchers

The Type 1936C destroyer was a planned class of destroyer for the Kriegsmarine. The class was intended to consist of five ships, Z46, Z47, Z48, Z49 and Z50. They were designed to be an improvement of Type 1936A and B destroyers. Only two of the five ships, Z46 and Z47, were ever laid down, and work was halted for a year between 1942 and 1943. Construction was constantly interrupted by numerous problems, predominantly due to air raids, material supply delays and a shortage of copper. The two ships that were laid down, Z46 and Z47, were blown up by Allied troops in 1945.

== Characteristics ==
The Type 1936C destroyers were to be 121.5 metres (399 ft) long at waterline, and 126.2 metres (414 ft) long overall. They were to have a breadth of 12.2 metres (40 ft), and a depth of 6.65 metres (21.8 ft). They were to have a draught of 3.62 metres (11.9 ft) at standard load, 3.88 metres (12.7 ft) at design load, and 4.45 metres (14.6 ft) at full load. They were to displace 2,636 tonnes (2,594 long tons; 2,906 short tons) at standard load, 3,071 tonnes (3,022 long tons; 3,385 short tons) at design load, and 3,683 tonnes (3,625 long tons; 4,060 short tons) at full load. They were to have a complement of 320, and carry one motor pinnace, one motor yawl, one torpedo cutter and one dinghy.

The Type 1936C destroyers were to be armed with six 12.8-centimetre (5.0 in) quick firing guns with 720 rounds of ammunition, with a speed of 20 rounds per minute, which had a range of 19 kilometres (12 mi), to be placed in three LC.41 twin turrets, one forward and two aft. An advanced radar-controllable fire control system was placed upon the two aft turrets; six 3.7-centimetre (1.5 in) anti-aircraft guns with 12,000 rounds of ammunition, placed in three LM/42 twin mountings, one forward and two aft; eight to 14 2-centimetre (0.8 in) anti-aircraft guns with 16,000–28,000 rounds of ammunition, placed in LM/44 mountings; two quadruple 53.3-centimetre (21.0 in) torpedo tubes (8–12 rounds); and 60 mines with four depth charge launchers.

Their propulsion systems were to consist of six Wagner boilers feeding high-pressure superheated steam (at 70 atm (1,029 psi; 7,093 kPa) and 450 °C (842 °F)) to two sets of Wagner geared steam turbines, which were 3.35 metres (11.0 ft) in diameter. They were to have one electricity plant with one 200 kilowatts (270 hp) turbo-generator and four 80 kilowatts (110 hp) diesel generators, for a total output of 520 kilowatts (700 hp) at 220 electronvolts (35 aJ). They were to have 70,000 shaft horsepower (52,000 kW) at 390 revs per minute, giving them a top speed of 37.5 knots (69.5 km/h; 43.2 mph). They were to carry 822 tonnes (809 long tons; 906 short tons) of oil, giving them a range of 2,500 nautical miles (4,600 km; 2,900 mi) at 19 knots (35 km/h; 22 mph).

== Development ==
The Type 1936C was intended as an improvement of both the Type 1936A and B destroyers. The Type 1936C was very similar in basic hull and identical in machinery to the Type 1936A, with the major difference between the two being the Type 1936C's use of turbines originally intended for use by the Spähkreuzers, and their heavier firepower.

The first two ships of the class, Z46 and Z47, were ordered on 8 October 1941, and laid down at a later date. Construction was halted in 1942 due to lack of material, but was restarted again in 1943. The construction of the two ships was constantly delayed due to damage from aircraft raids, material supply delays and shortages of copper, among other problems, resulting in very slow progress. The two ships were blown up in 1945 by Allied troops. The other three ships: Z48, Z49, and Z50 were ordered on 12 June 1943, but never laid down.

== Ships ==
Ship	Builder, Shipyard	Yard #	Ordered	Fate
Z46	Deschimag, Bremen	#1071	8 October 1941	Blown up in 1945.
Z47	Deschimag, Bremen	#1072	8 October 1941	Blown up in 1945.
Z48	Deschimag, Bremen	#1157	12 June 1943	Never laid down.
Z49	Deschimag, Bremen	#1158	12 June 1943	Never laid down.
Z50	Deschimag, Bremen	#1159	12 June 1943	Never laid down.
