= German destroyer Z39 =

German destroyer during World War II

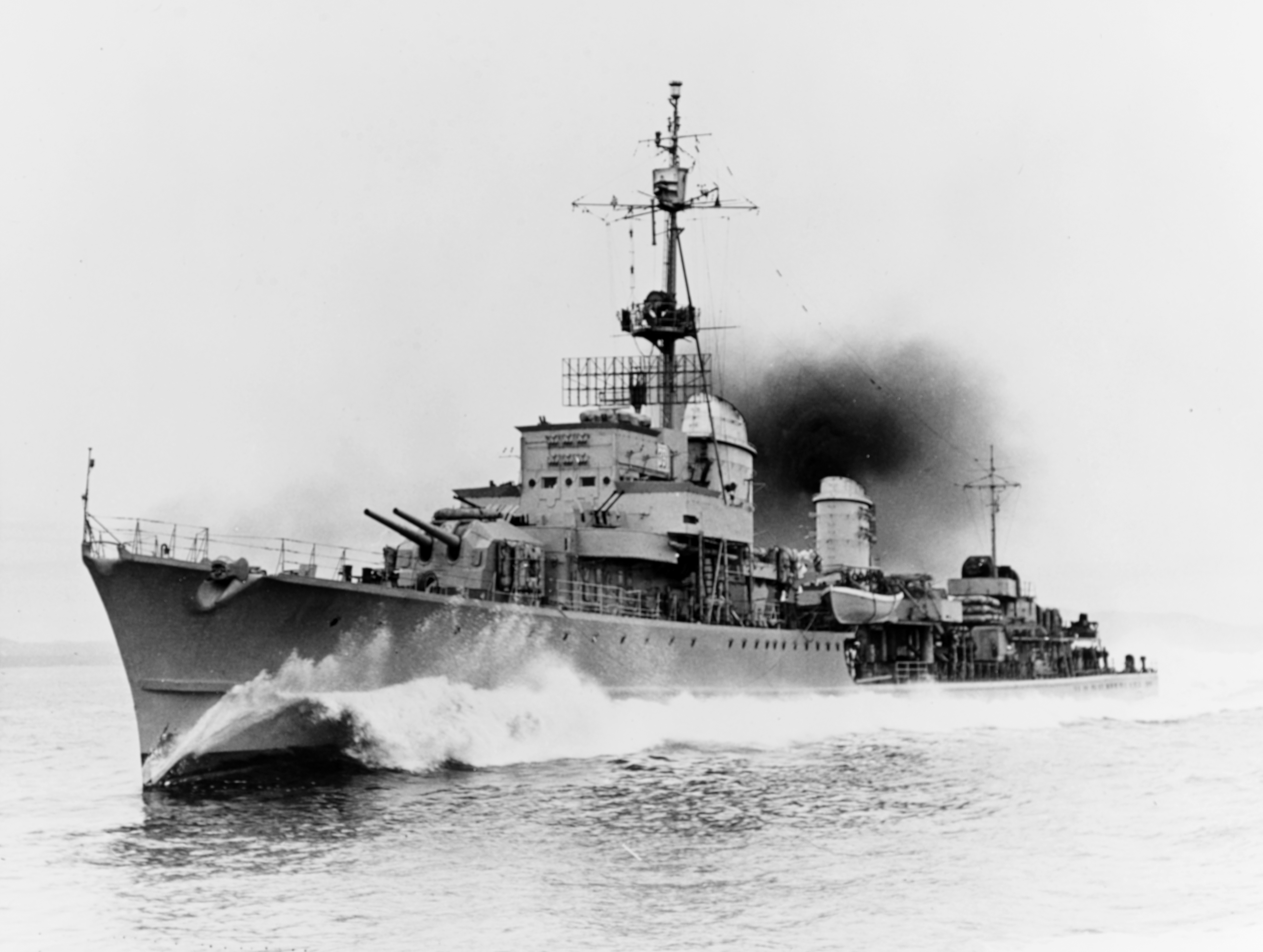
- Z39 underway under American control, 1945

History

Nazi Germany
- Name: Z39
- Ordered: 26 June 1939
- Builder: Germaniawerft, Kiel
- Yard number: G629
- Laid down: 15 August 1940
- Launched: 2 December 1941
- Completed: 7 January 1944
- Commissioned: 21 August 1943
- Fate: Transferred to the United States Navy in 1945

United States
- Name: DD-939
- Commissioned: 14 September 1945
- Decommissioned: 1947
- Fate: Transferred to the French Navy

France
- Name: Q-128
- Commissioned: 1948
- Fate: Broken up in 1964

General characteristics (as built)
- Class & type: Type 1936A (Mob) destroyer
- Displacement: 2,519 t (2,479 long tons) (standard)
- Length: 127 m (416 ft 8 in) (o/a)
- Beam: 12 m (39 ft 4 in)
- Draught: 4 m (13 ft 1 in)
- Installed power: 6 × water-tube boilers; 70,000 PS (51,000 kW; 69,000 shp)
- Propulsion: 2 × shafts; 2 × geared steam turbine sets
- Speed: 38.5 knots (71.3 km/h; 44.3 mph)
- Range: 2,239 nmi (4,147 km; 2,577 mi) at 19 knots (35 km/h; 22 mph)
- Complement: 332
- Armament: 1 × twin, 2 × single 15 cm (5.9 in) guns; 2 × twin 3.7 cm (1.5 in) AA guns; 7 × single 2 cm (0.8 in) AA guns; 2 × quadruple 53.3 cm (21 in) torpedo tubes; 60 × mines

Z39 was a Type 1936A (Mob) destroyer built for Germany's Kriegsmarine during World War II. She was laid down in August 1940 and completed three years later. Her anti-aircraft armament was increased extensively during the war. Z39 served with the 6th Destroyer Flotilla her entire German career, which she spent escorting transports in the Baltic Sea, laying mines, and bombarding land forces. The destroyer served the navies of a total of three different countries: from 1943 to 1945 with the Kriegsmarine as Z39, from 1945 to 1947 with the United States Navy as DD-939, and from 1948 to 1964 with the French Navy as Q-128.

Throughout her German service, the ship laid numerous barrages (explosives concentrated over a wide area) of mines in the Baltic Sea and bombarded Soviet forces several times. In the last months of the war, Z39 helped escort steamships that were evacuating German soldiers and civilians from Eastern Europe to Denmark. Z39 was damaged twice, once by Soviet planes while in Paldiski and then by British planes while in Kiel. At the end of the war, the destroyer was transferred to the United States Navy. It conducted experiments testing her equipment—her high-pressure steam propulsion plant in particular. After the US Navy deemed her obsolete, the ship was transferred to the French Navy, where she was cannibalized for parts, and made into a pontoon boat for minesweepers.

== Background ==
=== Interbellum ===
Following the end of World War I Germany signed the Treaty of Versailles, which put strict limits both on the size and displacement of warships that she could possess. During the Interbellum, the period between the first and second world wars, the average size of Allied ships and their armaments in almost all warship categories grew substantially. As a result of the treaty, Germany felt that her ships could not compete with those of the Allied navies and began to ignore the treaty, at first covertly, and later openly after Hitler, the Führer (dictator) of Nazi Germany, publicly denounced it in March 1935. The displacements of all German ships at the time were purposefully understated to have their official sizes comply with the treaty. At first, these changes were made with the goal of being able to match or exceed French and Polish destroyers, but later it was necessary that these destroyers be able to match British destroyers, a much more difficult goal.

Due to the comparatively small number of German shipyards, compared to the British or French, Germany adopted a policy of over-arming her destroyers to compensate for their low numbers, so that they bore similar armament to French and Polish light cruisers. Several negative consequences resulted from this, such as making them slower and overweight. Although German heavy destroyers matched British light cruisers in armament, they were much less seaworthy and had far worse facilities for control and use of their guns.

=== Plan Z ===
Plan Z was a German naval rearmament plan that started in 1939, and involved building ten battleships, four aircraft carriers, twelve battlecruisers, three pocket battleships, five heavy cruisers, forty-four light cruisers, sixty-eight destroyers, and 249 submarines. These ships were to form two battle fleets: a "Home Fleet" to tie down the British war fleet in the North Sea, and a "Raiding Fleet" to wage war upon British convoys. Erich Raeder, the Grand Admiral of the Kriegsmarine, was assured by Hitler that war would not start until at least 1945. Raeder had wanted the deadline for the completion of Plan Z to be extended to 1948, but Hitler insisted on 1945, although Hitler privately wanted to be at war with the Anglo-French alliance by 1942. World War II began in 1939, meaning that very few of Germany's heavy ships would be finished at that point. Germany's main naval opponents were France and England. Compared to the number of ships Germany had upon entry into the war (in parentheses) they had: 22 battleships (two), seven carriers (none), 22 heavy cruisers (four), 61 light cruisers (six), 255 destroyers (34), 135 submarines (57, of which less than half could actually serve in the Atlantic or the North Sea). Due to the clear advantage her enemies had, Raeder remarked that the Kriegsmarine could not hope to win, and thus the only course for them was to "die valiantly".

=== Destroyer function ===
The function of the destroyer was defined by its evolution: around the 1870s, nations that could not directly threaten Great Britain's navy began to invest in torpedo boats, small and agile ships which used their torpedoes to deliver enough damage to pose a tactical issue to enemy fleets. Near the turn of the 20th century, British and German torpedo boats grew in size to the point of creating a separate line of sea-going torpedo craft, "torpedo boat destroyers", or simply destroyers, designed in part to counter torpedo boats themselves. Experience in World War I showed that destroyers very rarely engaged capital ships, but more often fought other destroyers and submarines; because of this, destroyers were partially re-focused towards escort and anti-submarine services. During the war, they were used as "maids of all work", fulfilling virtually every role to some degree, and, unlike capital ships, which rarely left port during the war, served in numerous operations. By the end of the war, destroyers were perceived as one of the most useful classes of ships.

During World War II, destroyers served essentially the three basic functions they had in World War I: to act as screening ships to defend their fleets from those of an enemy, to attack an enemy's screening ships, and to defend their fleet from submarines. However, there was an increased desire to introduce anti-aircraft measures to the destroyers, although many nations struggled to do so effectively. How destroyers were actually used varied by country. Germany did not use her destroyers to defend against submarines, hence their lack of strong anti-submarine armament. Germany relied on a massive fleet of trawlers that had been requisitioned and refitted as minelayers instead. British destroyers were built for escorting fleets, defending them from enemy planes and sinking submarines. German destroyers were built to escort fleets, or act as torpedo boats. The role of the destroyer began to vary more widely as World War II progressed, with five parallel evolutions: the all-purpose destroyer (all countries), the anti-submarine destroyer (United States and United Kingdom), the anti-aircraft destroyer (Japan and the United Kingdom), the small destroyer (Germany and Italy), and the super-large destroyer (France).

== Design and armament ==
Z39 was of the Type 1936A (Mob) destroyer class. She was 121.9 metres (400 ft) long at the waterline and 127 metres (416 ft 8 in) long overall, had a beam of 12 metres (39 ft 4 in), and a draught of 4 metres (13 ft 1 in). The destroyer had a displacement of 2,519 tonnes (2,479 long tons) at standard load, and 3,691 tonnes (3,633 long tons) at full load. Her crew complement was 332.

Before Project Barbara modifications to improve the anti-aircraft capabilities of German ships, the ship was armed with: seven 2 cm (0.8 in) anti-aircraft (AA) guns, two twin 3.7 cm SK C/303.7 cm (1.5 in) anti-aircraft guns, (Note: SK – Schnelladekanone (quick loading cannon); C – Construktionsjahr (year of gun's design).) a twin 15-centimetre (5.9 in) L/48 gun on a forward turret, (Note: L – Länge in Kaliber (length in caliber).) two single 15-centimetre (5.9 in) L/48 guns in a gunhouse aft, two quadruple 53.3 cm (21 in) torpedo tubes, and 60 mines. Z39 had the Greek coat of arms on either side of her 15-centimetre (6 in) twin turret. After the modifications, the destroyer carried eighteen 2 cm (0.8 in) and fourteen twin 3.7 cm (1.5 in) guns; the rest of her armament remained unchanged.

Her propulsion system consisted of six Wagner water-tube boilers that generated and fed high-pressure superheated steam (at 70 atm (1,029 psi; 7,093 kPa) and 450 °C (842 °F)) to two sets of Wagner geared steam turbines. These gave the ship a rated power of 70,000 shaft horsepower (52,000 kW), and a top speed of 38.5 knots (71.3 km/h; 44.3 mph). She had a range of 2,239 nautical miles (4,147 km; 2,577 mi), at her cruising speed of 19 knots (35 km/h; 22 mph).

Z39's sensor suite housing included a FuMO 21 radar that was placed on the ship's bridge and four FuMB4 Sumatra aerials on the foremast searchlights. (Note: FuMO (Funkmessortung) means radar device, FuMB (Funkmessbeobachter) means radar detector.) The ship also had several other radars and radar detectors, including a FuMB 3 Bali and FuMO 81 Berlin-S on her masthead and a FuMO 63 Hohentweil K. She also had a degaussing cable that wrapped around the entire ship, but was covered by her spray deflector.

== Service history ==
Z39 was ordered on 26 June 1939, laid down by Germaniawerft at Yard G629 in Kiel on 15 August 1940, launched on 2 December 1941 and was commissioned on 21 August 1943. Her commissioning had been delayed by lengthy construction times, and Z39 was not fully operational until 7 January 1944. There were a number of reasons for these construction issues. The small number of German shipyards forced the Kriegsmarine to prioritize construction, inexperienced naval engineers, and the lack of workers. At some point between her launching and commissioning, she was modified under Project Barbara, with the addition of three pairs of 3.7 cm (1.5 in) anti-aircraft guns, one pair forward of her bridge, one pair abreast after her funnel, and one pair abreast forward of her funnel. The ship had one pair of single 3.7 cm (1.5 in) guns added to her after funnel platform. The destroyer had a pair of twin 2 cm (0.8 in) guns added to her bridge wings. She had a pair of quadruple 2 cm (0.8 in) guns and a pair of single 2 cm (0.8 in) guns added to an extended deckhouse at the No. 3 gun position. After her commissioning, the ship began minelaying operations in the Skagerrak and the Kattegat until March 1944 when she was transferred to Reval off the Gulf of Finland.

=== German service ===
A map of Z39's service history

After the move to Reval, she served in the 6th Destroyer Flotilla, alongside the German destroyers Z25, Z28, and Z35. Between 12 and 13 February Z39 laid mines in the "Dorothea A" barrage, along with two other destroyers and three minelayers. On 10 March, she took part in minelaying operations along with two other destroyers. Between 11 and 12 March, she bombarded Soviet forces near Narva-Jõesuu. From 13 March to 22 April, the destroyer took part in six different minelaying operations. One such operation lasted from 13 to 14 April, in which Z39, two other destroyers, and six minelayers laid the "Seeigel 6b" mine barrage south of Suur Tytärsaari. From 16 to 17 April, Z39, two other destroyers, and six minelayers laid the "Seeigel 3b" barrage off of Vigrund Island in Narva Bay. A smokescreen was laid during the operation to prevent the ships from being shelled by Soviet coastal artillery. An operation from 21 to 22 April, involving Z39, two other destroyers, and six minelayers was canceled midway after one of the minelayers hit a mine and sank. From 23 to 24 April, Z39, two other destroyers and eight minelayers laid the "Seeigel 7b/3" barrage in Narva Bay. From 25 to 26 April Z39, two other destroyers and nine minelayers laid the "Seeigel 8b" barrage southwest of Suur Tyärsaari. During the operations between 13 and 26 April, a total of 2,831 mines and 1,174 sweep detonators were laid.

On 23 June of the same year, Z39 was damaged by Soviet bombers while moored off of Paldiski and was escorted to Libau by Z28. After reaching Libau on 29 June, Z39 made her way to Kiel for repairs by way of the Piast Canal near Swinemünde. While in port at Kiel on 24 July, she was hit by a bomb when the British Royal Air Force bombed Kiel Harbor, causing damage to the quarterdeck which required her to be towed back to Swinemünde. Z39 was repaired using parts cannibalised from Z44 and Z45. Z44 was damaged in an air raid on 29 July at Bremen and sunk yet her superstructure remained above water and Z45 was being built. Z39 was repaired enough to be seaworthy on 28 February 1945 and was ordered to sail to Copenhagen for extensive repairs, however, due to Nazi Germany's shortage of fuel, she sailed to Sassnitz instead. At this time, the Kriegsmarine, which had always dealt with shortages of oil, reached critically low levels of oil supply. On 25 March, the repairs on Z39 were finished while the ship was in Swinemünde; she resumed operations on 1 April. From 5 April to 7 April, she escorted transports and some of Task Force Thiele around the Bay of Danzig. From 8 April to 9 April, Z39 provided naval gunfire support for the German army. On 10 April she and T33 (a torpedo boat) escorted the German destroyer Z43, which had sustained damage from both mines and bombs, to Warnemünde and Swinemünde.

From 1944, German surface ships were called upon to provide support for Army Group North along the Baltic Sea coast. This often involved shelling land targets for which the German ship crews had no training. This tactical use of cruisers, destroyers, and torpedo boats was difficult in the restrictive waterways of the Baltic, but despite these difficulties, it justified the continued existence of the surface fleet. The Soviet Union's ongoing advances along the east Baltic coast also spurred this change. From the spring of 1945 to near the end of the war, the surface forces of the Kriegsmarine became almost entirely focused upon resupplying and supporting garrisons along the Baltic Coast. After March 1945 the Kriegsmarine embarked upon the task of evacuating hundreds of thousands of civilians and soldiers from the east ahead of the Soviet forces, which were rapidly pushing westward. Z39 took part in a number of these evacuation operations. On 15 April, Z39 with two other destroyers and four torpedo boats escorted the German steamships Matthias Stinnes, Eberhart Essberger, Pretoria and Askari to Copenhagen with 20,000 refugees. On 2 May, she shelled Soviet Army forces from the Oder estuary. On 3 May, she and the battleship Schlesien moved to protect the bridge across the Peene river at Wolgast. After Schlesien hit a mine near Greifswalder Oie on the same day, Z39 towed her to Swinemünde, where Schlesien was deliberately grounded. The ship was placed so that her guns could fire on and defend roads leading into the city. A day later, Z39, three other destroyers, one torpedo boat, one ship's tender, one auxiliary cruiser, one anti-aircraft ship, and five steamer ships, sailed for Copenhagen, taking 35,000 wounded soldiers and refugees with them. Germany surrendered on 8 May, however some units still continued to evacuate. On 8 May, Z39, six other destroyers and five torpedo boats set sail with 20,000 soldiers and civilians from Hela to Glücksburg, and they arrived on 9 May. Following the German surrender, she was decommissioned at Kiel from the Kriegsmarine on 10 May 1945.

=== American and French service ===
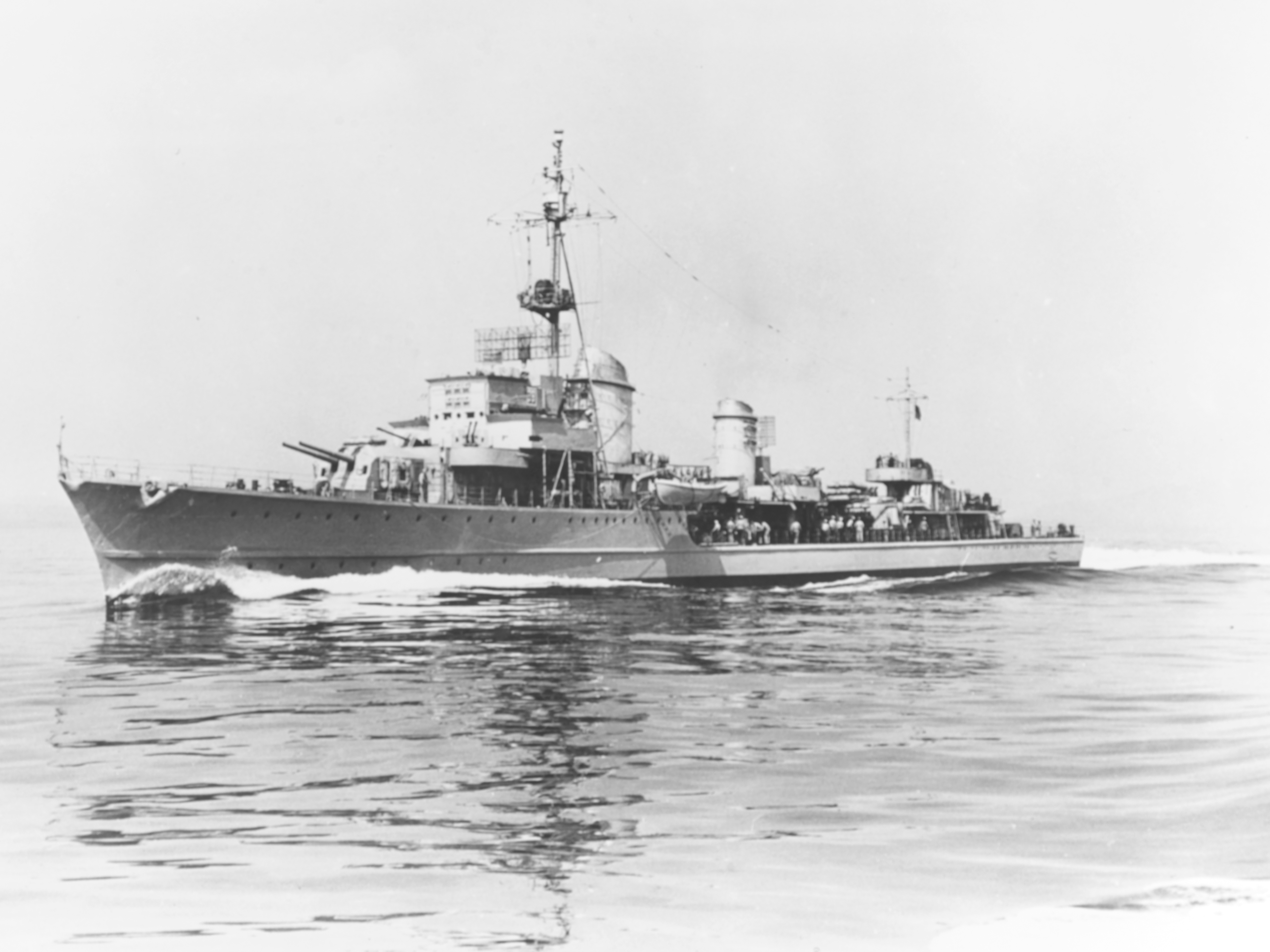
Z39 underway off Boston on 22 August 1945

At some unknown point after the war ended, Z39 sailed with a mixed German and British crew to Wilhelmshaven and then to Plymouth, England on 6 July 1945. The US claimed her as a prize ship on 12 July. She left England on 30 July, and arrived in Boston on 7 August where on 14 September, after extensive trials, the destroyer was commissioned into the US Navy as DD-939. She was used by the US Navy to test her equipment, namely her high-pressure steam propulsion plant. In November 1947, the US Navy deemed her obsolete, and transferred her to the French Navy. After arriving in Casablanca in January 1948, she sailed to Toulon, where DD-939 was redesignated as Q-128, and was later cannibalized for her parts, which were used to repair the French destroyers Kléber (ex-Z6 Theodor Riedel), Hoche (ex-Z25), and Marceau (ex-Z31). There was an unsuccessful push to have her restored to working condition at some point in her French service. Q-128 served as a pontoon for minesweepers near Brest until the ship was broken up in 1964.
