= German destroyer Z36 =

Destroyer ship

- Semi-oblique photo of Z36

History

Nazi Germany
- Name: Z36
- Ordered: 17 February 1941
- Builder: AG Weser (Deschimag), Bremen
- Yard number: W1006
- Laid down: 15 September 1941
- Launched: 15 May 1943
- Commissioned: 19 February 1944
- Fate: Sunk by mine, 12 December 1944

General characteristics
- Class & type: Type 1936B destroyer
- Displacement: 2,519 long tons (2,559 t) (standard); 3,542 long tons (3,599 t) (deep load)
- Length: 127 m (416 ft 8 in) (o/a)
- Beam: 12 m (39 ft 4 in)
- Draught: 4.32 m (14 ft 2 in)
- Installed power: 70,000 PS (51,000 kW; 69,000 shp); 6 × water-tube boilers
- Propulsion: 2 × shafts; 2 × geared steam turbine sets
- Speed: 36 knots (67 km/h; 41 mph)
- Range: 2,600 nmi (4,800 km; 3,000 mi) at 19 knots (35 km/h; 22 mph)
- Complement: 316–336
- Armament: 5 × single 12.7 cm (5 in) guns; 2 × twin 3.7 cm (1.5 in) AA guns; 3 × quadruple, 3 × single 2 cm (0.79 in) AA guns; 2 × quadruple 53.3 cm (21 in) torpedo tubes; 4 × depth charge throwers; 74–76 × mines

Z36 was one of five Type 1936B destroyers built for the Kriegsmarine (German Navy) during World War II. Completed in early 1944, the ship spent the war in the Baltic Sea, escorting German ships, laying minefields, and bombarding Soviet forces. On 12 December, a navigational error caused her to enter a German minefield as she was preparing to lay another minefield in the Gulf of Finland off the Estonian coast. Z36 struck a single mine and sank with the loss of all hands. The wreck was surveyed in 1994.

== Design and description ==
The Type 1936B design retained the hull design of the Type 1936A, but reverted to the lighter main armament of the Type 1936 to reduce topweight and improve seakeeping. The ships had an overall length of 127 metres (416 ft 8 in) and was 121.9 metres (399 ft 11 in) long at the waterline. The ship had a beam of 12 metres (39 ft 4 in), and a maximum draught of 4.32 metres (14 ft 2 in). They displaced 2,519 long tons (2,559 t) at standard load and 3,542 long tons (3,599 t) at deep load. The two Wagner geared steam turbine sets, each driving one propeller shaft, were designed to produce 70,000 metric horsepower (51,000 kW; 69,000 shp) using steam provided by six Wagner water-tube boilers for a designed speed of 36 knots (67 km/h; 41 mph). The ships carried a maximum of 835 tonnes (822 long tons) of fuel oil which gave a range of 2,600 nautical miles (4,800 km; 3,000 mi) at 19 knots (35 km/h; 22 mph). Their crew consisted of 11–15 officers and 305–20 sailors.

The Type 1936B ships carried five 12.7-centimetre (5 in) SK C/34 guns in single mounts with gun shields, two each superimposed, fore and aft of the superstructure. The fifth mount was positioned on top of the rear deckhouse. The guns were designated No. 1 to 5 from front to rear. Their anti-aircraft armament consisted of four 3.7-centimetre (1.5 in) SK C/30 guns in two twin mounts abreast the rear funnel and fifteen 2-centimetre (0.8 in) C/38 guns in three quadruple and three single mounts. The ship carried eight above-water 53.3-centimetre (21 in) torpedo tubes in two power-operated mounts. Two reloads were provided for each mount. They had four depth charge launchers and mine rails could be fitted on the rear deck that had a maximum capacity of 74–76 mines. 'GHG' (Gruppenhorchgerät) passive hydrophones were fitted to detect submarines and a S-Gerät sonar was also probably fitted. The ships were equipped with a FuMO 24/25 radar set above the bridge.

== Construction and career ==
Z36 was originally ordered as a Type 1938B destroyer from AG Weser (Deschimag) on 28 June 1939, but the contract was cancelled when the Type 1938B design was abandoned, and the ship was reordered as a Type 1936A (Mob) destroyer. That was changed to a Type 1936B on 17 February 1941. She was laid down as yard number W1006 on 15 September at Deschimag's Bremen shipyard, launched on 15 May 1943 and commissioned on 19 February 1944, under the command of Korvettenkapitän (Lieutenant Commander) Fredric von Hausen. After working up Z36 was assigned to the 6. Zerstörerflotille (6th Destroyer Flotilla) in mid-1944.

In preparation for Operation Tanne West, the occupation of Åland in case of Finnish surrender, the flotilla escorted the heavy cruiser Lützow to the island of Utö on 28 June, but the operation was canceled and the ships returned to port. On 30 July and 1 August Z36 and three other destroyers of the flotilla sailed into the Gulf of Riga to bombard Soviet positions inland. On 5 August, they escorted the heavy cruiser Prinz Eugen as she engaged targets on the island of Ösel, Estonia, and in Latvia on 19–20 August. Z36 and the destroyer Z28 escorted the troopship MV Monte Rosa, laden with refugees, from Baltischport, Estonia, to Gotenhafen, Germany, on 16 September. That month, the flotilla also covered the convoys evacuating Finland and then Reval. From 10 to 15 October the flotilla escorted Lützow and Prinz Eugen as they resumed their shore bombardment missions and bombarded targets themselves, attacking Soviet positions at Memel and Libau. The following month, the flotilla and the heavy cruisers Admiral Scheer and Prinz Eugen shelled Soviet positions during the evacuation of Sworbe, on Ösel, between 20 and 24 November.

In mid-December, the 6. Zerstörerflotille, which now consisted of Z36, her sister ships Z35 and Z43, and the large torpedo boats T23 and T28, was tasked to lay a new minefield between the Estonian coast and an existing minefield slightly further out to sea. T23 was to escort the other ships and the destroyers were laden with 68 mines each. The mission was postponed to the night of 11/12 December because of bad weather and the flotilla sailed on the morning of the 11th. The weather gradually worsened over the course of the day and the spray and rain made navigation difficult. Having sailed a bit too far north, Z35 and Z36 blundered into the Nashorn (Rhinoceros) minefield that was only 2.5 nautical miles (4.6 km; 2.9 mi) north of the intended position of the new minefield. Around 02:00, Z36 struck a mine and sank very quickly with the loss of all hands.

The wreck was surveyed by the Finnish Ministry of the Environment in 1994 at 59°38.1′N 24°20′E.

== Bibliography ==
- Gröner, Erich (1990). German Warships 1815–1945. Vol. 1: Major Surface Warships. Annapolis, Maryland: Naval Institute Press. ISBN 0-87021-790-9.
- Koop, Gerhard & Schmolke, Klaus-Peter (2003). German Destroyers of World War II. Annapolis, Maryland: Naval Institute Press. ISBN 1-59114-307-1.
- Rohwer, Jürgen (2005). Chronology of the War at Sea 1939–1945: The Naval History of World War Two (Third Revised ed.). Annapolis, Maryland: Naval Institute Press. ISBN 1-59114-119-2.
- Whitley, M. J. (1991). German Destroyers of World War Two. Annapolis, Maryland: Naval Institute Press. ISBN 978-1-55750-302-2.
