= German destroyer Z51 =

Destroyer ship

Class overview
- Name: Type 1942 destroyer
- Builders: Deschimag
- Operators: Kriegsmarine
- Preceded by: Type 1936C destroyer
- Built: 1943–1944
- Planned: 1
- Lost: 1

General characteristics
- Type: Destroyer
- Displacement: 2,014 tonnes (1,982 long tons; 2,220 short tons) (standard load); 2,330 tonnes (2,290 long tons; 2,570 short tons) (design load); 2,720 tonnes (2,680 long tons; 3,000 short tons) (full load)
- Length: 108 meters (354 ft) (waterline); 114.3 meters (375 ft) (overall)
- Beam: 11 meters (36 ft)
- Draught: 3.72 meters (12.2 ft) (standard load); 3.98 meters (13.1 ft) (design load); 4.37 meters (14.3 ft) (full load)
- Installed power: 57,000 electric horsepower (43,000 kW)
- Propulsion: 6 x two-stroke, 24-cylinder diesel engines; 3 x shafts
- Speed: 36 knots (67 km/h; 41 mph) (top speed); 19 knots (35 km/h; 22 mph) (cruising speed)
- Range: 5,500 nautical miles (10,200 km; 6,300 mi) at 19 knots (35 km/h; 22 mph) (Note: The range would have greatly increased at a lower cruising speed.)
- Boats & landing craft carried: 1 x Motor pinnace; 1 x Torpedo cutter
- Complement: 12 officers and 335 enlisted
- Armament: 4 x 12.7-centimeter (5.0 in) QF guns (720 rounds of ammunition); 8 x 3.7-centimeter (1.5 in) AA guns (16,000 rounds); 12 x 2-centimeter (0.8 in) AA guns (24,000 rounds); 2 x triple 53.3-centimeter (21.0 in) torpedo tubes (18 rounds); 50 mines

Z51 was the only ship of the Type 1942 destroyer class built for the Kriegsmarine. She was the only destroyer built by the Kriegsmarine to use diesel fuel, which would have given it a longer range and readier access to refueling compared to fuel oil. The Type 1942 destroyer class went through a long period of development, including four total designs. Z51 was ordered on 25 November 1942, and launched on 2 October 1944, far before being finished, likely to clear her slipway for U-boat construction. She was left floating outside Bremen and was sunk in an air raid on 21 March 1945. Germany attempted to communicate the plans for the Type 1942 destroyer to its ally the Empire of Japan using a submarine, U-234, however Germany surrendered before the submarine reached Japan. Z51 was broken up between 1948 and 1949.

== Background ==
=== Interbellum ===
Following the end of World War I Germany signed the Treaty of Versailles, which put strict limits both on the size and displacement of warships that she could possess. During the Interwar period, the period between the first and second world wars, the average size of Allied ships and their armaments in almost all warship categories grew substantially. As a result of the treaty, Germany felt that her ships could not compete with those of the Allied navies and began to ignore the treaty, at first covertly, and later openly after Adolf Hitler, the Führer (leader) of Nazi Germany, publicly denounced it in March 1935. The displacements of all German ships at the time were purposefully understated to have their official sizes comply with the treaty. At first, changes to German destroyers were made with the goal of being able to contain French and Polish destroyers, effectively making the destroyers double as small cruisers. This was exemplified by the jump in the displacement of the Type 1934 destroyers from 1,100 tonnes (1,200 short tons) as planned in 1932 to 1,625 tonnes (1,791 short tons) when contracted. While these changes were made in order to allow them to overpower their French and Polish counterparts, which displaced 1,378 tonnes (1,519 short tons) and 1,540 tonnes (1,700 short tons) respectively, later it was necessary that these destroyers be able to match British destroyers, a much more difficult goal.

Due to the comparatively small number of German shipyards, compared to the British or French, Germany adopted a policy of heavily arming her destroyers to compensate for their low numbers, so that they bore similar armament to French and Polish light cruisers. Several negative consequences resulted from this, such as making them slower and overweight. Although German heavy destroyers matched British light cruisers in armament, they were much less seaworthy and their fire control was inferior.

=== Plan Z ===
Plan Z was a German naval rearmament plan that started in 1939, and involved building ten battleships, four aircraft carriers, twelve battlecruisers, three pocket battleships, five heavy cruisers, forty-four light cruisers, sixty-eight destroyers, and 249 submarines. These ships were to form two battle fleets: a "Home Fleet" to tie down the British war fleet in the North Sea, and a "Raiding Fleet" to wage war upon British convoys. Erich Raeder, the Grand Admiral of the Kriegsmarine, was assured by Hitler that war would not start until at least 1945. Raeder had wanted the deadline for the completion of Plan Z to be extended to 1948, but Hitler insisted on 1945, although Hitler privately wanted to be at war with the Anglo-French alliance by 1942. World War II began in 1939, meaning that very few of Germany's heavy ships would be finished at that point. Germany's main naval opponents were France and England. Compared to the number of ships Germany had upon entry into the war (in parentheses) the two countries had combined totals of: 22 battleships (two), seven carriers (none), 22 heavy cruisers (four), 61 light cruisers (six), 255 destroyers (34), 135 submarines (57, of which less than half could actually serve in the Atlantic or the North Sea). Due to the clear advantage her enemies had, Raeder remarked that the Kriegsmarine could not hope to win, and thus the only course for them was to "die valiantly".

=== Destroyer function ===
The function of the destroyer was defined by its evolution: around the 1870s, nations that could not directly threaten the British Royal Navy began to invest in torpedo boats, small and agile ships which used their torpedoes to deliver enough damage to pose a tactical issue to enemy fleets. Near the turn of the 20th century, British and German torpedo boats grew in size to the point of creating a separate line of sea-going torpedo craft, "torpedo boat destroyers", or simply destroyers, designed in part to counter torpedo boats themselves. Experience in World War I showed that destroyers very rarely engaged capital ships, but more often fought other destroyers and submarines; because of this, destroyers were partially re-focused towards escort and anti-submarine services. During the war, they were used as "maids of all work", fulfilling virtually every role to some degree, and, unlike capital ships, which rarely left port during the war, served in numerous operations. By the end of the war, destroyers were perceived as one of the most useful classes of ships.

During World War II, destroyers served essentially the three basic functions they had in World War I: to act as screening ships to defend their fleets from those of an enemy, to attack an enemy's screening ships, and to defend their fleet from submarines. There was an increased desire to introduce anti-aircraft measures to the destroyers, although many nations struggled to do so effectively. How destroyers were actually used varied by country. Germany did not use her destroyers to defend against submarines, hence their lack of strong anti-submarine armament. Germany relied on a massive fleet of trawlers that had been requisitioned and refitted as minelayers instead. British destroyers were built for escorting fleets, defending them from enemy aircraft and sinking submarines. German destroyers were built to escort fleets, or act as torpedo boats. The role of the destroyer began to vary more widely as World War II progressed, with five parallel evolutions: the all-purpose destroyer (all countries), the anti-submarine destroyer (the United States and the United Kingdom), the anti-aircraft destroyer (Japan and the United Kingdom), the small destroyer (Germany and Italy), and the super-large destroyer (France).

== Development ==
The Type 1942 destroyer class marked a major change from previous destroyer concepts produced by the Kriegsmarine, as it was the first design to be given diesel propulsion. This was done because of the longer endurance offered by diesel, (Note: Diesel propulsion gave the ship an extended range. The Kriegsmarine was particularly keen on developing a longer-range destroyer to compensate for its lack of light cruisers.) and likely also because diesel fuel was more readily obtainable for Nazi Germany. Between 1928 and 1935, MAN Augsburg built a light, double acting, two-stroke diesel motor, which met German navy specifications. The motors were then tested on the German cruiser Leipzig and the training ship Bremse. The motors encountered initial teething problems, which although swiftly overcome, allowed those supportive of steam engines to deny diesel propulsion any research funding in the critical building period from 1935 on. It was not until 1938 that the Kriegsmarine renewed its interest in diesel propulsion. However, the advent of World War II largely led to the suspension of research, except for the Type 1942 destroyer class, which was to use six MAN type 12Z32/34 engines.

=== Diesel engines ===
Six MAN type 12Z32/34 engines were ordered in 1943, but only four were completed by the end of the war in 1945. Test work on the engines was abandoned in February 1945, due to lack of fuel. The type 12Z32/34 engine was 24-cylinder, placed in a 2 × 12 configuration, had a 320-millimeter (13 in) bore, a 440 mm (17 in) stroke motor, and was a 'V' form, fast-running, double-acting, two-stroke, diesel engine made of welded steel. It had a maximum of 600 revs per minute, a piston speed of 8.8 meters per second (29 ft/s), maximum output of 12,000 horsepower (8,900 kW), medium effective pressure of 5.52 kilograms per square centimeter (78.5 psi), and a maximum fuel demand of 185 grams per horsepower per hour (2.43 oz/kW/ks). It had a dry weight of 67 tonnes (66 long tons; 74 short tons), including auxiliary machinery, but not the oil cooler. The six engines combined would give the Type 1942 destroyer class a range to match the pocket battleships and U-boats.

=== Sub-designs ===
The Type 1942 design was expanded to three sub-designs as it was developed: 'A', 'B', and 'C'. The original plan had a six-diesel engine, three-shaft configuration, with an armament of four 12.7-centimeter (5.0 in) guns, with two superfiring on the fore and two superfiring on the aft. The design attracted much criticism, thus a new sketch was drawn, 'A', with a twin 12.7 cm turret on the fore and aft, with a single 12.7 cm turret superfiring over both. This design also drew criticism. By December 1943, the Führer der Zerstörer (FdZ), the commander of destroyer development and deployment, demanded that the fore single superfiring turret be removed, in order to reduce the length, improve speed, and reduce bow weight. They also mandated that the aft single 12.7 cm guns be able to elevate up to 75°. However, on 22 January 1944, after a meeting between the FdZ and Naval Group North, the FdZ dropped their demand for the fore single turret to be removed, after being informed that the speed loss due to it was marginal.

At the same conference, the new 12.7 cm KM/41 naval gun was also discussed, as it was the best quick-firing gun design of the time. It was pointed out that the 12.7 cm KM/41 had a severe lack of anti-aircraft abilities, due to the fact that none of the mountings were tri-axial, and indeed, only the single turret guns were even bi-axial. Additionally, the twin turrets could only elevate to 52°, and the single turrets only to 75°. Because of this, questions on the worth of stabilization for the directors and rangefinders were raised, whereupon it was decided that it would be up to the Shipbuilding Commission to decide if the stabilization would come with too great a weight penalty and to omit if they felt it did. Due to the severe lack of anti-aircraft defense, it was decided to replace the LM/44 2 cm (0.79 in) twin mounted AA guns with 3 cm (1.2 in) twin mount AA guns if possible, although the 2 cm AA guns were considered an acceptable interim measure. Another point of consideration was the matter of the new 5.5 cm (2.2 in) Gerät 58 AA gun, which was designed for U-boats. The idea of mounting these guns on the Type 1942 destroyer class was discussed at length, although it had major issues. One such issue was that the new 5.5 cm guns weighed between 6 tonnes (5.9 long tons; 6.6 short tons) and 7 t (6.9 long tons; 7.7 short tons), inclusive of directors and sights, which meant that the four 3.7 cm (1.5 in) guns could be replaced by only two 5.5 cm guns. Another issue raised was that room would have to be made for the new 5.5 guns. It was decided that the aft single 12.7 cm gun and two twin 2 cm guns would be removed to make room for two 5.5 cm guns, although it was noted that the 12.7 cm guns would likely arrive before the 5.5 cm guns, and thus the 12.7 cm guns would be allowed on a temporary basis. It was also decided that the remaining 3.7 cm AA guns would be replaced by 3 cm guns, in order to simplify ammunition supply.

Another conference was held on 9 February 1944, to discuss the weight and trim of the design. It was decided that the torpedo tube placement would follow that of its predecessors, with one set forward and one abaft the second funnel. Due to this, and the huge number of earlier changes, the design still being worked upon was dubbed the 'B' sub-design. However, yet further modifications were made, by 14 February the Shipbuilding Commission had convinced the other groups to change the design to have three twin main guns. This design dubbed the 'C' sub-design, had two LM/41 twin turrets placed forward, and one aft, all of which were controlled by radar-equipped directors. The number of 5.5 cm guns was increased to three, grouped about the aft funnel. The hull length and displacement were slightly increased, and the engine machinery was moved further back on the boat, to balance out the weight of the added turret. The propulsion system was to be divided into four motor rooms, each containing two diesel motors (although only four were actually placed in Z51).

=== Designs ===
Design	Propulsion	Main armament	Other armament	Torpedo tubes
Initial	Six × MAN type 12Z32/34 diesel engines	4 × 12.7 cm single naval guns, 2 forward, 2 aft	Unknown	2 × 53.3 cm triple tubes, in unspecified locations
'A'	Six × MAN type 12Z32/34 diesel engines	2 × 12.7 cm twin naval guns, one forward, one aft 2 × 12.7 cm single naval guns, one forward, one aft	8 × 3.7 cm AA guns 12 x 2 cm AA guns	2 × 53.3 cm triple tubes, in unspecified locations
Later 'A'	Six × MAN type 12Z32/34 diesel engines	2 × 12.7 cm twin naval guns, one forward, one aft 1 × 12.7 cm single naval gun, forward	2 × 5.5 cm AA guns 12 × 3 cm AA guns	2 × 53.3 cm triple tubes, in unspecified locations
'B'	Six × MAN type 12Z32/34 diesel engines	2 × 12.7 cm twin naval guns, one forward, one aft 1 × 12.7 cm single naval gun, forward	2 × 5.5 cm AA guns 12 × 3 cm AA guns	2 × 53.3 cm triple tubes, before and abaft the second funnel
'C'	Eight × MAN type 12Z32/34 diesel engines	3 × 12.7 cm twin naval guns, two forward, one aft	3 × 5.5 cm AA guns 12 × 3 cm AA guns	2 × 53.3 cm triple tubes, before and abaft the second funnel

=== Z51 ===
Only one ship of the type was ever laid down, Z51. Z51's design was modified heavily from the original ('A') design of the Type 1942 destroyer, and slightly modified from the final ('C') design. The original eight MAN type 12Z32/34 diesel engines, which were to drive two shafts via Vulkan gearing, were replaced by only four such engines, which were coupled to the center shaft, with the wing engines being removed entirely. After 1944, Germany increasingly transmitted schematics and research for advanced science and weaponry to her ally the Empire of Japan using submarines, as they were the only method of transportation available to Germany that could hope to reach Japan. One such transportation was attempted by German submarine U-234, carrying the material and designs for advanced weaponry, involving new torpedoes, two Messerschmitt Me 262 jet fighters with schematics to build them, and the designs for the Type 1942 destroyer class. However, Germany surrendered on 8 May 1945, before U-234 could reach its target, and she therefore surrendered herself to USS Sutton, in the western Atlantic, on 14 May 1945.

== Characteristics ==
The Type 1942 destroyers were to be 108.0 meters (354.3 ft) long at waterline, and 114.3 m (375 ft) long overall. Their design gave them a breadth of 11 m (36 ft), and a freeboard of 6.5 m (21 ft). They would have a draught of 3.72 m (12.2 ft) at standard load, 3.98 m (13.1 ft) at design load, and 4.37 m (14.3 ft) at full load. They would displace 2,014 tonnes (1,982 long tons; 2,220 short tons) at standard load, 2,330 t (2,290 long tons; 2,570 short tons) at design load, and 2,720 t (2,680 long tons; 3,000 short tons) at full load. They were to have a complement of 12 officers and 335 crewmembers. They were to carry one motor pinnace and one torpedo cutter.

Their armament was to be four 12.7-centimeter (5.0 in) quick firing guns, with 720 rounds of ammunition, and a range of 17.4 km (10.8 mi); eight 3.7 cm (1.5 in) anti-aircraft guns, with 16,000 rounds; twelve 2 cm (0.79 in) anti-aircraft guns, with 24,000 rounds of ammunition; two triple 53.3 cm (21.0 in) torpedo tubes, with 18 rounds of ammunition; and 50 mines.

Their propulsion was made up of six MAN type 12Z32/34, 24-cylinder (in a 2 × 12 configuration), two-stroke, 'V'-form diesel engines, which had a 320-millimeter (13 in) bore, a 440 mm (17 in) stroke motor, and were made of welded steel, which were placed on three shafts of unknown diameter. The two outer shafts were directly connected to one 5,620-shaft-horsepower (4,190 kW) diesel engine. The central shaft connected to four diesel engines, with each central engine producing 11,650 shp (8,690 kW). Their planned electricity plant is unknown. This setup was designed to give a total output of 57,000-electric-horsepower (43,000 kW) or 57,120-brake-horsepower (42,590 kW), giving them a top speed of 36 knots (67 km/h; 41 mph). They were to carry 533 t (525 long tons; 588 short tons) of diesel fuel, to give them a range of 5,500 nautical miles (10,200 km; 6,300 mi) at 19 knots (35 km/h; 22 mph).

== Construction and loss ==
Z51 was ordered from the German shipyard company Deschimag on 25 November 1942, and launched on 2 October 1944. She was sunk during a major air raid on Bremen, on 21 March 1945. She had just been moved away from a fitting-out quay at the Deschimag yard, although largely incomplete: she had only her forward and after shelter decks, no machinery was installed and her shaft tunnels had been welded up to make them watertight. From this, it has been suggested that her launch was done only to clear the slip for U-boat building. She was lying abandoned, with her portside to the eastern end of Kohlenhafen, alongside Röchling wharf.

During the air raid, she was hit by two bombs, although one may not have hit her directly; one struck the vicinity of the bulkhead between compartments X1 and X11, breaking off the fore-end just behind her No. 2 gun pivot. A later bomb hit her aft, fracturing the stern aft of her No. 4 gun position and causing her quarterdecks to hang at an angle. At this point, numerous holes and cracks had formed in the hull, causing her to flood with water and sink to the bottom. Later on, a crane from the nearby dockyard fell across her deck, above her after motor room. After the war, on 21 January 1948, the Weser Port Salvage Authorities called for tenders to assist in her breaking up. A number of quotations were given, ranging from 130,000 to 200,000 RM (Reichsmark), and from four to 13 months' duration. Eventually, a contract was placed on 17 February 1948, with Deutsches Dampfschiffahrts Hansa, for 132,000 RM and eight months of work. Her breaking up was finished in February 1949. Her four diesel engines were never installed due to the war and were left on MAN's testbeds in Augsburg. Two were later seized by the Allies during the postwar occupation of Germany. One surviving engine was retained by MAN and displayed in its company museum until it was transferred to the Auto & Technik Museum in Sinsheim in 1982.
