= German destroyer Z43 =

Destroyer ship

Coordinates: 54.8089°N 9.7825°E

- Z43 during her sea trials in mid-1944

History

Nazi Germany
- Name: Z43
- Ordered: 17 February 1941
- Builder: AG Weser (Deschimag), Bremen
- Yard number: W1029
- Laid down: 1 May 1942
- Launched: 22 September 1943
- Commissioned: 31 May 1944
- Fate: Scuttled, 3 May 1945

General characteristics
- Class & type: Type 1936B destroyer
- Displacement: 2,519 long tons (2,559 t) (standard); 3,542 long tons (3,599 t) (deep load)
- Length: 127 m (416 ft 8 in) (o/a)
- Beam: 12 m (39 ft 4 in)
- Draught: 4.32 m (14 ft 2 in)
- Installed power: 70,000 PS (51,000 kW; 69,000 shp); 6 × water-tube boilers
- Propulsion: 2 × shafts; 2 × geared steam turbine sets
- Speed: 36 knots (67 km/h; 41 mph)
- Range: 2,600 nmi (4,800 km; 3,000 mi) at 19 knots (35 km/h; 22 mph)
- Complement: 316–336
- Armament: 5 × single 12.7 cm (5 in) guns; 2 × twin 3.7 cm (1.5 in) AA guns; 3 × quadruple, 3 × single 2 cm (0.79 in) AA guns; 2 × quadruple 53.3 cm (21 in) torpedo tubes; 4 × depth charge throwers; 74–76 × mines

Z43 was a Type 1936B destroyer built for the Kriegsmarine (German Navy) during World War II. Completed in mid-1944, the ship spent the war in the Baltic Sea, escorting German ships, laying minefields, and bombarding Soviet forces. She participated in a minelaying operation in December 1944, where her sister ships Z35 and Z36 were sunk when they accidentally entered a German minefield. She was badly damaged by a mine on 10 April 1945, and scuttled on 3 May of that same year.

== Design and description ==
The Type 1936B design retained the hull design of the Type 1936A, but reverted to the lighter main armament of the Type 1936 to reduce topweight and improve seakeeping. The ships had an overall length of 127 metres (416 ft 8 in) and was 121.9 metres (399 ft 11 in) long at the waterline. They had a beam of 12 metres (39 ft 4 in), and a maximum draught of 4.32 metres (14 ft 2 in). The ships displaced 2,519 long tons (2,559 t) at standard load and 3,542 long tons (3,599 t) at deep load. The two Wagner geared steam turbine sets, each driving one propeller shaft, were designed to produce 70,000 metric horsepower (51,000 kW; 69,000 shp) using steam provided by six Wagner water-tube boilers for a designed speed of 36 knots (67 km/h; 41 mph). The ships carried a maximum of 835 tonnes (822 long tons) of fuel oil which gave a range of 2,600 nautical miles (4,800 km; 3,000 mi) at 19 knots (35 km/h; 22 mph). Their crew consisted of 11–15 officers and 305–20 sailors.

The Type 1936B ships carried five 12.7-centimetre (5 in) SK C/34 guns in single mounts with gun shields, two each superimposed, fore and aft of the superstructure. The fifth mount was positioned on top of the rear deckhouse. The guns were designated No. 1 to 5 from front to rear. Their anti-aircraft armament consisted of four 3.7-centimetre (1.5 in) SK C/30 guns in two twin mounts abreast the rear funnel and fifteen 2-centimetre (0.8 in) C/38 guns in three quadruple and three single mounts. The ship carried eight above-water 53.3-centimetre (21 in) torpedo tubes in two power-operated mounts. Two reloads were provided for each mount. They had four depth charge launchers and mine rails could be fitted on the rear deck that had a maximum capacity of 74–76 mines. 'GHG' (Gruppenhorchgerät) passive hydrophones were fitted to detect submarines and a S-Gerät sonar was also probably fitted. The ships were equipped with a FuMO 24 (Note: Funkmess-Ortung (Radio-direction finder, active ranging)) search radar above the bridge.

== Construction and career ==
Z43 was originally ordered as a Type 1938B destroyer from AG Weser (Deschimag) on 28 June 1939, but the contract was cancelled when the Type 1938B design was abandoned, and the ship was reordered as a Type 1936A (Mob) destroyer. That was changed to a Type 1936B on 17 February 1941. She was laid down as yard number W1029 on 1 May 1942 at Deschimag's Bremen shipyard, launched on 22 September 1943 and commissioned on 31 May 1944 under the command of Fregattenkapitän (Commander) Carl Heinrich Lampe. After working up Z43 was assigned to the 6. Zerstörerflotille (6th Destroyer Flotilla) in October 1944.

The following month, the flotilla and the heavy cruisers Admiral Scheer and Prinz Eugen shelled Soviet positions during the evacuation of Sworbe, on the Estonian island of Saaremaa, between 20 and 24 November. In mid-December, the 6. Zerstörerflotille, which now consisted of Z43, her sisters Z35 and Z36, and the large torpedo boats T23 and T28, was tasked to lay a new minefield between the Estonian coast and an existing minefield slightly further out to sea. T23 was to escort the other ships and the destroyers were laden with 68 mines each. The mission was postponed to the night of 11/12 December because of bad weather and the flotilla sailed on the morning of the 11th. The weather gradually worsened over the course of the day and the spray and rain made navigation difficult. Having sailed a bit too far north, Z35 and Z36 blundered into the Nashorn (Rhinoceros) minefield that was only 2.5 nautical miles (4.6 km; 2.9 mi) north of the intended position of the new minefield. They both struck mines and sank around 02:00; so close to the minefield, no effort was made to rescue any survivors in the darkness.

In January and early February 1945, Z43 escorted convoys between Gotenhafen, Germany, and Libau, Latvia. Between 18 and 24 February, German forces launched a local counterattack in Samland; Admiral Scheer, Z43, and other ships provided artillery support, targeting Soviet positions near Peyse and Gross-Heydekrug. The German attack temporarily restored the land connection to Königsberg. On 27 February, the ship helped to escort the ocean liner SS Hamburg to Sassnitz. Z43 escorted Admiral Scheer and her sister Lützow from Danzig Bay to Swinemünde on 7 March and then bombarded Soviet positions near Kolberg from 11 to 18 March to cover the evacuation of the city. From 23 March to 7 April, the ship escorted Lützow and other German ships in Danzig Bay while also bombarding Soviet troops.

Z43 was struck by a Soviet bomb that failed to detonate on 9 April, but she struck a mine the following day. The explosion blew a 15-by-4-metre (49 ft × 13 ft) hole in her hull, broke her keel, and flooded the centre and aft boiler rooms. The torpedo boat T33 began a tow, but the destroyer was later able to steam under her own power to Rostock for emergency repairs that included welding several beams to the hull to strengthen it. Z43 then steamed into Warnemünde harbour to provide gunfire support for German troops ashore after having off-loaded all of her anti-aircraft guns and some of her crew. She departed Warnemünde on 2 May for Kiel, having exhausted all of her ammunition. The ship was scuttled near Flensburg the following day.

== Bibliography ==
- Gröner, Erich (1990). German Warships 1815–1945. Vol. 1: Major Surface Warships. Annapolis, Maryland: Naval Institute Press. ISBN 0-87021-790-9.
- Koop, Gerhard & Schmolke, Klaus-Peter (2003). German Destroyers of World War II. Annapolis, Maryland: Naval Institute Press. ISBN 1-59114-307-1.
- Rohwer, Jürgen (2005). Chronology of the War at Sea 1939–1945: The Naval History of World War Two (Third Revised ed.). Annapolis, Maryland: Naval Institute Press. ISBN 1-59114-119-2.
- Whitley, M. J. (1991). German Destroyers of World War Two. Annapolis, Maryland: Naval Institute Press. ISBN 978-1-55750-302-2.
