= Type 1936B destroyer =

German class of destroyers

- Z43

Class overview
- Name: Type 36B destroyer
- Builders: DeSchiMAG, Bremen
- Operators: Kriegsmarine
- Preceded by: Type 1936A destroyer
- Succeeded by: Type 1936C destroyer
- Built: 1941–1945
- In commission: 1943–1945
- Planned: 8
- Completed: 5
- Canceled: 3
- Lost: 5

General characteristics
- Type: Destroyer
- Displacement: 2,519 long tons (2,559 t) (standard)
- Length: 127 m (416 ft 8 in) (o/a)
- Beam: 12 m (39 ft 4 in)
- Draught: 4.32 m (14 ft 2 in)
- Installed power: 6 × water-tube boilers; 70,000 PS (51,000 kW; 69,000 shp)
- Propulsion: 2 × shafts; 2 × geared steam turbine sets
- Speed: 36 knots (67 km/h; 41 mph)
- Range: 2,600 nmi (4,800 km; 3,000 mi) at 19 knots (35 km/h; 22 mph)
- Complement: 316–336
- Armament: 5 × single 12.8 cm (5 in) guns; 2 × twin 3.7 cm (1.5 in) AA guns; 3 × quadruple, 3 × single 2 cm (0.8 in) AA guns; 2 × quadruple 53.3 cm (21 in) torpedo tubes; 4 × depth charge throwers; 74–76 × mines

The Type 1936B destroyers were a group of five destroyers built for Nazi Germany's Kriegsmarine between 1941 and 1942, of which only three were completed and saw service. Eight ships of this design were ordered, but the orders for three ships were cancelled before construction began. Z35 was the first ship of the class to be completed and was commissioned in mid-1943. Her sister ships, Z36 and Z43, followed in 1944. Z44 was sunk during an air raid in 1944 before she was completed while Z45 was never completed. Both ships were scrapped after the war.

All three ships spent the war in the Baltic Sea, escorting German convoys, laying minefields, and bombarding Soviet forces in 1944–1945. Z35 and Z36 were lost in the Gulf of Finland after hitting friendly mines in late 1944, while Z43 was scuttled a few days before the end of the war in May 1945.

== Design and description ==
The Type 1936B design retained the hull design of the preceding Type 1936A, but reverted to the lighter main armament of the Type 1936 to reduce topweight and improve seakeeping. They were also given a stronger anti-aircraft armament than the older ships.

The ships had an overall length of 127 metres (416 ft 8 in) and were 121.9 metres (399 ft 11 in) long at the waterline. They had a beam of 12 metres (39 ft 4 in), and a maximum draught of 4.32 metres (14 ft 2 in). They displaced 2,519 long tons (2,559 t) at standard load and 3,542 long tons (3,599 t) at deep load. The ship's hulls were divided into 16 watertight compartments and they were fitted with a double bottom that covered 47% of their length amidships. Their crew consisted of 11–15 officers and 305–20 sailors.

The Type 1936Bs were powered by two Wagner geared steam turbine sets, each driving a single three-bladed 3.35-metre (11 ft 0 in) propeller, using steam provided by six high-pressure Wagner water-tube boilers with superheaters that operated at a pressure of 70 atm (7,093 kPa; 1,029 psi) and a temperature of 426 °C (799 °F). The turbines were designed to produce 70,000 metric horsepower (51,000 kW; 69,000 shp) for a speed of 36 knots (67 km/h; 41 mph). The ships carried a maximum of 835 tonnes (822 long tons) of fuel oil which gave a range of 2,600 nautical miles (4,800 km; 3,000 mi) at 19 knots (35 km/h; 22 mph).

=== Armament and sensors ===
The Type 1936B ships carried five 45-calibre 12.7-centimetre (5 in) SK C/34 guns in single mounts with gun shields, two each superimposed, fore and aft of the superstructure. The fifth mount was positioned on top of the rear superstructure. The guns were designated No. 1 to 5 from front to rear. The mounts had a range of elevation from -10° to +30°, which gave them a range of 17,400 metres (19,000 yd) at maximum elevation. They fired 28-kilogram (62 lb) projectiles at a muzzle velocity of 830 m/s (2,700 ft/s) at a rate of 15–18 rounds per minute. The ships carried a total of 600 shells for the guns.

Their anti-aircraft armament consisted of four 80-calibre 3.7-centimetre (1.5 in) SK C/30 guns in two twin mounts abreast the aft funnel. The power operated mounts had a maximum elevation of 85° which gave the guns a ceiling of 6,800 metres (22,300 ft); horizontal range was 8,500 metres (9,300 yd) at an elevation of 35.7°. The single-shot SK C/30 fired 0.748-kilogram (1.65 lb) projectiles at a muzzle velocity of 1,000 m/s (3,300 ft/s) at a rate of 30 rounds per minute. The mounts were stabilized, but their gyroscopes were undersized and could not cope with sharp turns or heavy rolling. They were also fitted with fifteen fully automatic 65-calibre 2-centimetre (0.8 in) C/30 guns in three quadruple and three single mounts. The gun had an effective rate of fire of about 120 rounds per minute. Its 0.134-kilogram (0.30 lb) projectiles were fired at a muzzle velocity of 835 m/s (2,740 ft/s) which gave it a ceiling of 3,700 metres (12,100 ft) and a maximum horizontal range of 4,800 metres (5,200 yd).

The ships carried eight above-water 53.3-centimetre (21 in) torpedo tubes in two power-operated mounts. Two reloads were provided for each mount. The standard torpedo for the Type 36B destroyers was the G7a torpedo. It had a 300-kilogram (660 lb) warhead and three speed/range settings: 14,000 metres (15,000 yd) at 30 knots (56 km/h; 35 mph); 8,000 metres (8,700 yd) at 40 knots (74 km/h; 46 mph) and 6,000 metres (6,600 yd) at 44 knots (81 km/h; 51 mph). They had four depth charge launchers and mine rails could be fitted on the rear deck that had a maximum capacity of 74–76 mines. 'GHG' (Gruppenhorchgerät) passive hydrophones were fitted to detect submarines and an S-Gerät sonar was also probably fitted. The ships were equipped with a FuMO 24/25 radar set above the bridge.

== Ships ==
List of Type 1936B destroyers
Ship	Builder	Laid down	Launched	Commissioned	Fate
Z35	DeSchiMAG, Bremen	6 June 1941	2 October 1942	22 September 1943	Sunk by mines, 12 December 1944
Z36	DeSchiMAG, Bremen	15 September 1941	15 May 1943	19 February 1944	Sunk by mines, 12 December 1944
Z40	Germania-Werft, Kiel	Cancelled, June and October, 1940			
Z41	Germania-Werft, Kiel	Cancelled, June and October, 1940			
Z42	Germania-Werft, Kiel	Cancelled, June and October, 1940			
Z43	DeSchiMAG, Bremen	1 May 1942	22 September 1943	31 May 1944	Scuttled, 3 May 1945
Z44	DeSchiMAG, Bremen	1 August 1942	20 January 1944	—N/a	Sunk, 29 July 1944
Z45	DeSchiMAG, Bremen	1 September 1943	—N/a	—N/a	Scrapped, 1946

== Service ==
All three of the completed ships were assigned to the 6. Zerstörerflotille (6th Destroyer Flotilla) in the Baltic in 1944 as they completed working up. The flotilla was tasked to support minelaying efforts in the Baltic and the Gulf of Finland in February 1944, but initially escorted convoys before laying its first minefield in mid-March. Its primary activity remained minelaying through July, including reinforcing the existing minefields in the Gulf of Finland in April. Reinforced by the arrival of Z36 in late June, the flotilla began bombarding Soviet positions at the end of July, both by themselves and while escorting heavy cruisers on the same mission and intermittently continued to do so almost up until the end of the war. In September it covered the convoys evacuating German forces from Finland and then Estonia before Z43 was assigned to the flotilla the following month.

In mid-December the flotilla was ordered to lay a new minefield between the Estonian coast and an existing minefield slightly further out to sea. In bad weather on the night of 11/12 December, Z35 and Z36 blundered into that minefield and struck one or more mines each around 02:00. Z36 sank very quickly with the loss of all hands and Z35 lasted a bit longer before sinking. The crew abandoned ship before she sank, but only about 70 men were rescued by the Soviets. The only operational ship of the class remaining, Z43, escorted convoys at the beginning of 1945 before resuming her previous task of shore bombardment in mid-February. She continued to do so until early April when she struck a mine on 10 April that crippled her. After emergency repairs, Z43 then steamed into Warnemünde harbour where she provided gunfire support for German troops ashore. The ship departed Warnemünde on 2 May for Kiel after exhausting all of her ammunition. Z43 was scuttled the following day.

Construction of Z44 and Z45 was slowed by their lack of priority and only Z44 was launched before the end of the war. Work on both ships was ordered halted for at least three months on 24 July 1944, although it was rendered moot five days later when Z44 was sunk while fitting-out during an air raid by the Royal Air Force on Bremen. Both ships were already being cannibalized for parts to repair the destroyer Z39 by then and salvaging Z44 became impractical when her stern broke off in early September. Her wreck was scrapped in place in 1948–1949. Z45 was never finished and was broken up on the slipway in 1946.
