= German destroyer Z35 =

Destroyer ship

- Z35 at sea in the Baltic, 1944

History

Nazi Germany
- Name: Z35
- Ordered: 17 February 1941
- Builder: AG Weser (Deschimag), Bremen
- Yard number: W1005
- Laid down: 6 June 1941
- Launched: 2 October 1942
- Commissioned: 22 September 1943
- Fate: Sunk by mine, 12 December 1944

General characteristics
- Class & type: Type 1936B destroyer
- Displacement: 2,519 long tons (2,559 t) (standard); 3,542 long tons (3,599 t) (deep load)
- Length: 127 m (416 ft 8 in) (o/a)
- Beam: 12 m (39 ft 4 in)
- Draught: 4.32 m (14 ft 2 in)
- Installed power: 70,000 PS (51,000 kW; 69,000 shp); 6 × water-tube boilers
- Propulsion: 2 × shafts; 2 × geared steam turbine sets
- Speed: 36 knots (67 km/h; 41 mph)
- Range: 2,600 nmi (4,800 km; 3,000 mi) at 19 knots (35 km/h; 22 mph)
- Complement: 316–336
- Armament: 5 × single 12.7 cm (5 in) guns; 2 × twin 3.7 cm (1.5 in) AA guns; 3 × quadruple, 3 × single 2 cm (0.79 in) AA guns; 2 × quadruple 53.3 cm (21 in) torpedo tubes; 4 × depth charge throwers; 74–76 × mines

Z35 was the lead ship of her class of destroyers built for the Kriegsmarine (German Navy) during World War II. Completed in late 1943, the ship spent the war in the Baltic Sea, escorting German ships, laying minefields, and bombarding Soviet forces. On 12 December 1944, a navigational error caused her to enter a German minefield as she was preparing to lay another minefield in the Gulf of Finland off the Estonian coast. Z35 struck one or more mines and sank with the loss of all but 70 crewmen. The wreck was discovered and surveyed in 1994.

== Design and description ==
The Type 1936B design retained the hull design of the Type 1936A, but reverted to the lighter main armament of the Type 1936 to reduce topweight and improve seakeeping. The ships had an overall length of 127 metres (416 ft 8 in) and was 121.9 metres (399 ft 11 in) long at the waterline. The ships had a beam of 12 metres (39 ft 4 in), and a maximum draught of 4.32 metres (14 ft 2 in). They displaced 2,519 long tons (2,559 t) at standard load and 3,542 long tons (3,599 t) at deep load. The two Wagner geared steam turbine sets, each driving one propeller shaft, were designed to produce 70,000 metric horsepower (51,000 kW; 69,000 shp) using steam provided by six Wagner water-tube boilers for a designed speed of 36 knots (67 km/h; 41 mph). The ships carried a maximum of 835 tonnes (822 long tons) of fuel oil which gave a range of 2,600 nautical miles (4,800 km; 3,000 mi) at 19 knots (35 km/h; 22 mph). Their crew consisted of 11–15 officers and 305–20 sailors.

The Type 1936B ships carried five 12.7-centimetre (5 in) SK C/34 guns in single mounts with gun shields, two each superimposed, fore and aft of the superstructure. The fifth mount was positioned on top of the rear deckhouse. The guns were designated No. 1 to 5 from front to rear. Their anti-aircraft armament consisted of four 3.7-centimetre (1.5 in) SK C/30 guns in two twin mounts abreast the rear funnel and fifteen 2-centimetre (0.8 in) C/38 guns in three quadruple and three single mounts. The ship carried eight above-water 53.3-centimetre (21 in) torpedo tubes in two power-operated mounts. Two reloads were provided for each mount. They had four depth charge launchers and mine rails could be fitted on the rear deck that had a maximum capacity of 74–76 mines. 'GHG' (Gruppenhorchgerät) passive hydrophones were fitted to detect submarines and an S-Gerät sonar was also probably fitted. The ships were equipped with a FuMO 24/25 radar set above the bridge.

== Construction and career ==
Z35 was originally ordered as a Type 1938B destroyer from AG Weser (Deschimag) on 28 June 1939, but the contract was cancelled when the Type 1938B design was abandoned, and the ship was reordered as a Type 1936A (Mob) destroyer. That was changed to a Type 1936B on 17 February 1941. She was laid down as yard number W1005 on 6 June at Deschimag's Bremen shipyard, launched on 2 October 1942 and commissioned on 22 September 1943 under the command of Korvettenkapitän (Lieutenant Commander) Niels Bätge. After working up Z35 was assigned to the 6. Zerstörerflotille (6th Destroyer Flotilla) in February 1944.

The four destroyers and single torpedo boat of the flotilla were transferred to the Gulf of Finland to support minelaying operations there, Z35 arriving at Reval, Estonia, on 13 February. The flotilla was initially tasked to escort convoys between Libau, Latvia, and Reval, but laid its first minefield in Narva Bay on 12 March while bombarding Soviet positions on the eastern shore of the bay. They were primarily tasked as minelayers through July, including reinforcing the existing minefields in the Gulf of Finland in April. In preparation for Operation Tanne West, the occupation of Åland in case of Finnish surrender, the flotilla escorted the heavy cruiser Lützow to the island of Utö on 28 June, but the operation was canceled and the ships returned to port.

On 30 July and 1 August Z35 and three other destroyers of the flotilla sailed into the Gulf of Riga to bombard Soviet positions inland. On 5 August, they escorted Prinz Eugen as she engaged targets on the island of Ösel, Estonia, and in Latvia on 19–20 August. That last day Z35 damaged one of her propellers on a rock and had to return to Gotenhafen for repairs. In September the flotilla covered the convoys evacuating Finland and then Reval. On 10 October the flotilla escorted the heavy cruisers Lützow and Prinz Eugen as they resumed their shore bombardment missions and bombarded targets themselves, attacking Soviet positions at Memel, Libau, and Sworbe, on the Estonian island of Saaremaa, through the 24th. On 23 October a shell exploded prematurely in the barrel of No. 3 gun, wounding one man, and blowing the barrel and breech overboard. The following day Z35 was struck by splinters during a Soviet air attack. The following month, the flotilla and the heavy cruisers Admiral Scheer and Prinz Eugen shelled Soviet positions during the evacuation of Sworbe between 20 and 24 November.

By mid-December, Z35 was the flagship of Kapitän zur See (Captain) Friedrich Kothe, commander of the 6. Zerstörerflotille, which now consisted of his flagship, her sister ships Z36 and Z43, and the large torpedo boats T23 and T28, was tasked to lay a new minefield between the Estonian coast and an existing minefield slightly further out to sea. T23 was to escort the other ships and the destroyers were laden with 68 mines each. The mission was postponed to the night of 11/12 December because of bad weather and the flotilla sailed on the morning of the 11th. The weather gradually worsened over the course of the day and the spray and rain made navigation difficult. Having sailed a bit too far north, Z35 and Z36 blundered into the Nashorn (Rhinoceros) minefield that was only 2.5 nautical miles (4.6 km; 2.9 mi) north of the intended position of the new minefield. After a faint explosion was heard at about 01:52, Kothe radioed for T23 to close on Z35. Almost immediately afterwards, a mine struck the port side of the ship, abreast No. 4 gun, knocking out the port turbine and flooding one compartment. Z35 was not in any danger of sinking by 02:00 when Z36 struck a mine and sank very quickly with the loss of all hands. Shortly afterwards, Z35 suffered an explosion amidships, possibly from a boiler explosion that also detonated some ammunition. The crew abandoned ship before she sank, but only about 70 men were rescued by the Soviets.

The wreck was surveyed by the Finnish Ministry of the Environment in 1994 in 50 metres (160 ft) of water, at 59°38.2′N 24°20′E.

== Bibliography ==
- Gröner, Erich (1990). German Warships 1815–1945. Vol. 1: Major Surface Warships. Annapolis, Maryland: Naval Institute Press. ISBN 0-87021-790-9.
- Koop, Gerhard & Schmolke, Klaus-Peter (2003). German Destroyers of World War II. Annapolis, Maryland: Naval Institute Press. ISBN 1-59114-307-1.
- Rohwer, Jürgen (2005). Chronology of the War at Sea 1939–1945: The Naval History of World War Two (Third Revised ed.). Annapolis, Maryland: Naval Institute Press. ISBN 1-59114-119-2.
- Whitley, M. J. (1991). German Destroyers of World War Two. Annapolis, Maryland: Naval Institute Press. ISBN 978-1-55750-302-2.
