= Spähkreuzer =

Planned class of German cruisers

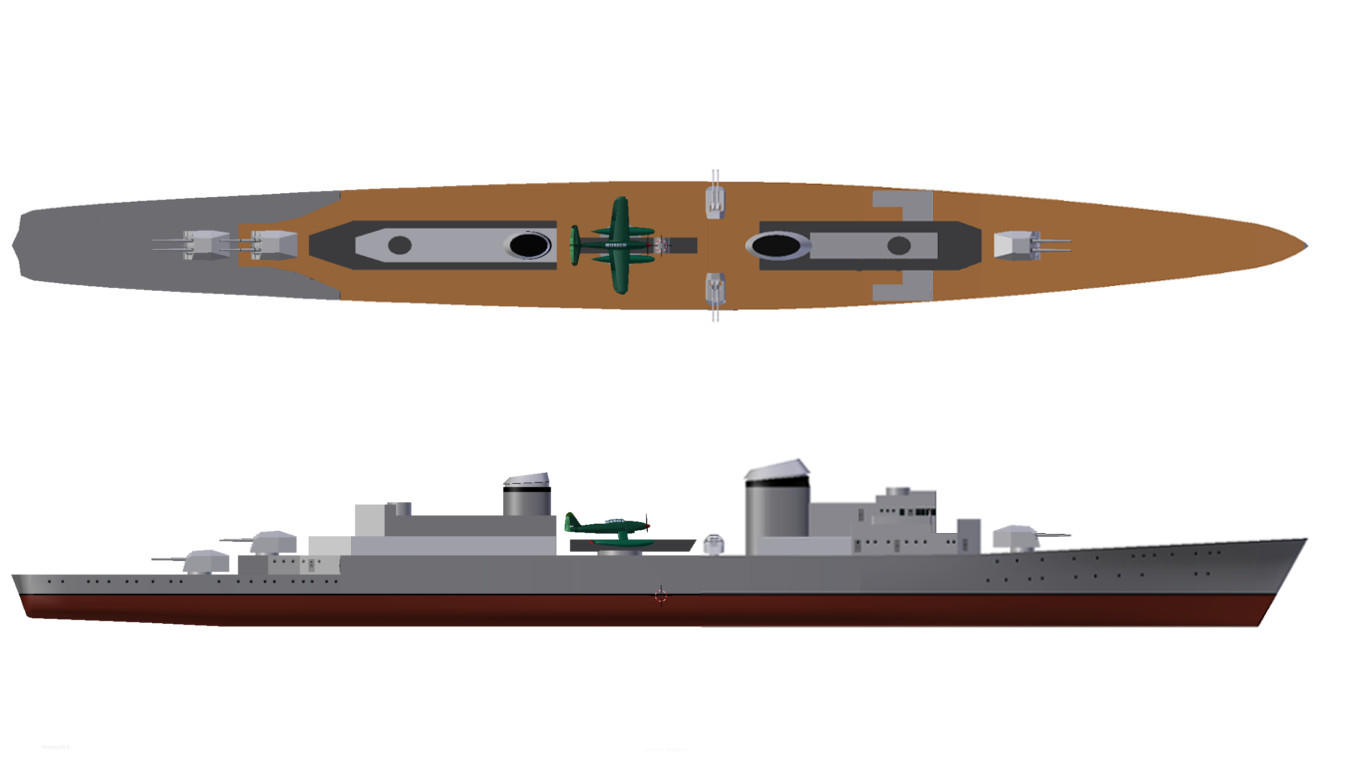
- Illustration of the Spähkreuzer 1939 design

Class overview
- Operators: Kriegsmarine
- Preceded by: M-class cruiser
- Succeeded by: None
- Planned: 6
- Cancelled: 6

General characteristics
- Type: Scout cruiser
- Displacement: 5,700 long tons (5,791 t)
- Length: 475 ft (145 m)
- Beam: 45 ft (14 m)
- Draft: 15 ft (4.6 m)
- Propulsion: 2 × MAN 6-cylinder diesel engines
- Speed: 36 knots (67 km/h; 41 mph)
- Range: 7,000 nmi (13,000 km) at 17 knots (31 km/h; 20 mph)
- Complement: 200
- Armament: 6 × 5.9 in (150 mm) guns; 2 × 88 mm AA; 8 × 37 mm AA; 8 × 20 mm AA; 10 × 21 in (533 mm) torpedo tubes
- Armor: Belt: 1 in (25 mm); Deck: 1 in (25 mm)

Spähkreuzer was the type name of a planned class of large destroyers or reconnaissance cruisers for Nazi Germany's Kriegsmarine.

== Design ==
There were three main designs proposed for this ship class, the 1938 design, the 1939 design and the 1940 design. The 1940 design was slightly larger and heavier with a more powerful power plant to keep or exceed the 1938 design performance. Both main designs, along with a few design variations, planned the main artillery layout of six 5.9-inch guns in three double turrets: one positioned on the bow and the other two on the stern. This was to allow a more offensive retreat, as these vessels were designed to scout ahead of the Plan Z battle groups.

A design designated as 1939 introduced a seaplane carried in the midships area; the torpedo tubes were removed to facilitate this. The catapult was suggested to be mounted between the funnels of the design, however there never seemed to be line drawings, or blueprints that showed that.

== Construction ==
The first 3 ships were ordered in February 1941, these were designated SP1, SP2, and SP3, and formally named Z40, Z41, and Z42. The order was placed for the Germania Shipyard in Kiel to build these vessels. In December 1941, 3 engines for SP4, SP5 and SP6 were ordered but not the ships.

SP1 was the only ship for which the keel was laid down and actual construction started. During an air raid in April 1942 the ship plans were destroyed and construction was halted. The metal was scrapped and used to build submarines and regular destroyers that were already further along in their build programs.
