= Deutsche Schiff- und Maschinenbau =

German shipyard cooperative (1926–45)

Deutsche Schiff- und Maschinenbau AG
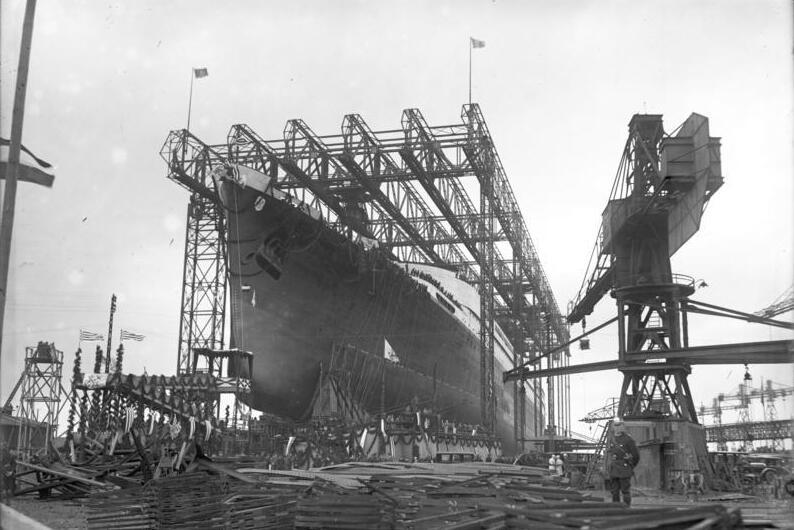
- Building SS Bremen, photo from August 1928
- Industry: Shipbuilding
- Founded: 1926
- Defunct: 1945
- Fate: dissolved 1945
- Successor: Schiffbau-Gesellschaft Unterweser
- Headquarters: Bremen, Germany
- Products: Passenger ships Merchant ships U-boats; Warships; Steam turbines Engines; Ship gear boxes Exhaust steam turbines
- Subsidiaries: Weser Flugzeugbau

Deutsche Schiff- und Maschinenbau Aktiengesellschaft (abbreviated Deschimag) was a cooperation of eight German shipyards in the period 1926 to 1945. The leading company was the shipyard AG Weser in Bremen.

== History ==
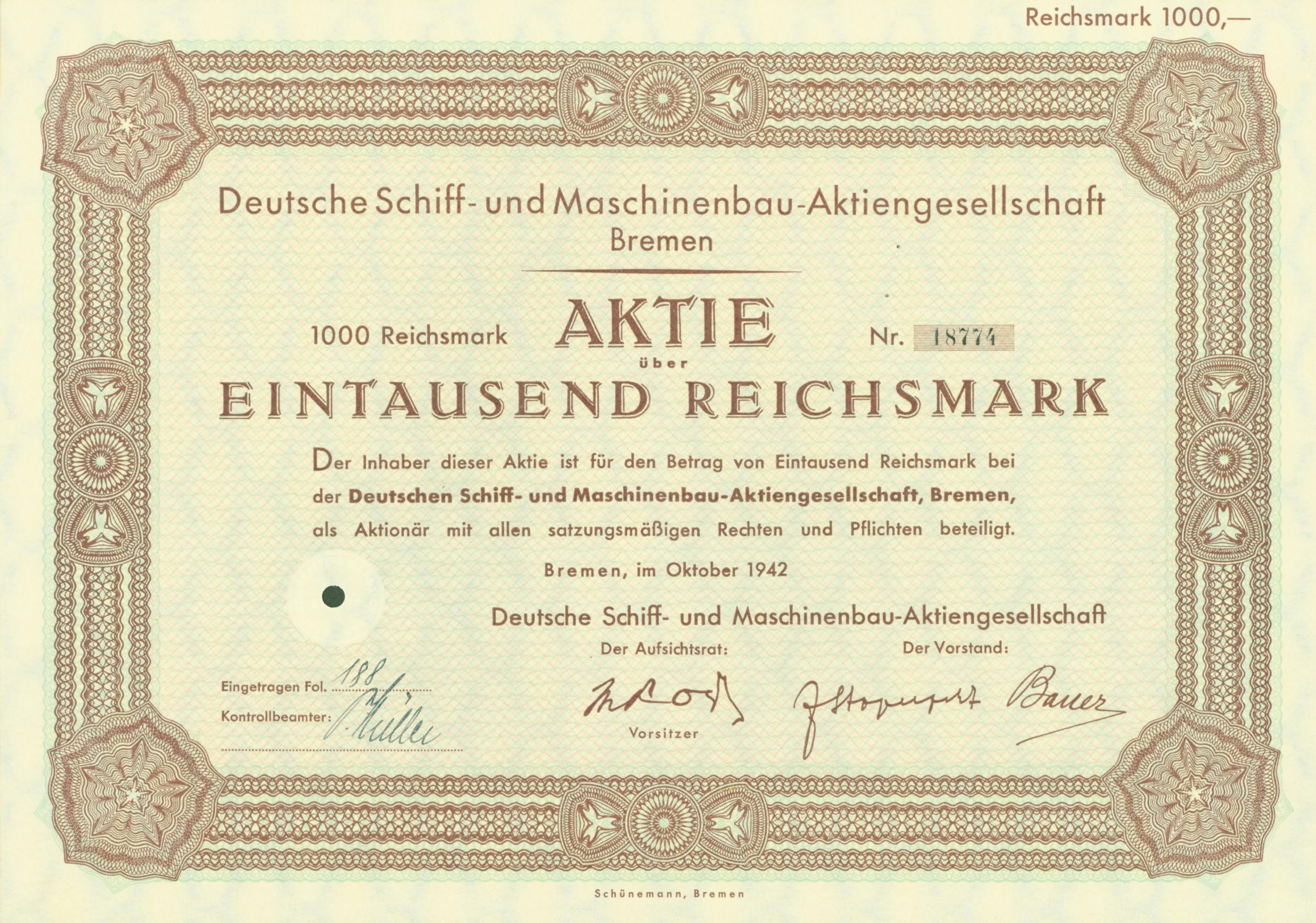
Share of the Deutschen Schiff- und Maschinenbau-AG, issued October 1942

The Deschimag was founded in 1926 when influential Bremen merchants and bankers decided to found a cooperation of great German shipbuilding companies under the leadership of the shipyard AG Weser. The intention was to coordinate and concentrate activities of German shipyards for higher efficiency but last not least mainly to support Bremen's shipyard AG „Weser“ in the upcoming economic and financial crisis of 1930s. While the largest shipbuilding companies in Germany as Blohm & Voss and Bremer Vulkan AG because of their own strong market position at that time were not interested in this cooperation, eight other large German shipyards merged. These were:

- Actien-Gesellschaft "Weser", Bremen (closed 1983)
- Vulkan-Werke Hamburg A.G., Hamburg (1930 sold to Howaldtswerke Kiel)
- Joh. C. Tecklenborg A.G., Wesermünde (closed 1928)
- AG Vulcan Stettin, Stettin (closed 1928)
- G. Seebeck A.G., Geestemünde (1988 merged to Schichau Seebeckwerft, closed 2009)
- Actien-Gesellschaft "Neptun", Rostock (bankruptcy 1935, since 1997 part of the shipbuilding company Meyer Werft GmbH, Papenburg)
- Nüscke & Co. A.G., Stettin (bankrupt 1928)
- Frerichswerft A.G., Einswarden (gave up shipbuilding 1935, afterwards Weser Flugzeugbau aircraft production)

Deschimag became the greatest shipbuilding company in Germany with about 15,000 workers which was about 28% of the total German shipbuilding industry workforce at that time. But in the following years most of these companies were closed, went bankrupt or were sold to other companies (see above). At least only AG Weser and Seebeckwerft survived this process of concentration and reduction of shipbuilding capacities. In 1941 Krupp, then the most important German engineering and armaments conglomerate, acquired a majority shareholding in both shipyards.

While AG Weser concentrated its activities upon building of merchant ships with an increasing amount of warships later, Seebeck built only smaller vessels and concentrated on ship maintenance and repair.

Because of diversification and to create new jobs Deschimag also diversified into aircraft construction. In 1933 the Weser Flugzeugbau GmbH – abbreviated Weserflug – was founded. It started making aircraft components and later complete aircraft at different places in Germany, one of them was the former shipyard Frerichswerft AG. In 1936 the Weserflug separated from the Deschimag and became an independent company. It became the fourth largest aircraft manufacturer in Germany in World War II, but only as a licensee of other German aircraft companies, mainly Dornier and Junkers.

Deschimag was dissolved after war but AG Weser and Seebeck AG shipyards again survived and continued in shipbuilding. Due to mismanagement and unsatisfactory and too late responses to market demands AG Weser was declared bankrupt in 1983 and operations were shut down while Seebeck shipyard became part of the Bremer Vulkan Verbund AG. Later in 1988 it merged with Schichau Shipyard to SSW Schichau Seebeck Shipyard GmbH, which closed in 2009.

== Ships of Deschimag ==
- SS Lichtenfels 1929: heavy lift ship, for DDG Hansa. Used to transport locomotives to India. Scuttled in Massawa in 1941.
- AG Weser 1929: ocean liner Bremen for Norddeutscher Lloyd. Won Blue Riband 1929 and 1933 for fastest Atlantic Ocean crossing. Bremen escaped after beginning of war from New York to Bremerhaven; burnt out 1940 in Bremerhaven, probably by arson.
- AG Weser 1935: turbo-electric ocean liner Scharnhorst for Norddeutscher Lloyd. Rebuilt to Japanese auxiliary aircraft carrier Shinyo in 1942; sunk 1944 by US submarine USS Spadefish.
- AG Weser 1935: geared-turbine ocean liner Gneisenau for Norddeutscher Lloyd. Sunk by a mine in the Baltic in May 1943; raised and scrapped in 1950.
- AG Weser 1936: whale factory ship Terje Viken for United Whalers Ltd. London. Largest factory ship in the World; March 1941 sunk by U-boats U-47 and U-99 in North Atlantic Ocean whilst travelling in Allied Convoy OB 293.
- AG Weser, 1937: whale factory ship Unitas for German company Jürgens-Van den Bergh. (Whale hunting vessels were built by Bremer Vulkan.) Became Japanese Nisshin Maru II; scrapped in Taiwan 1987.
- AG Weser, 1937: merchant ship Kandelfels for DDG Hansa. In WW II converted to German auxiliary cruiser Pinguin; 1941 sunk by British cruiser HMS Cornwall.
- AG Weser, 1938: merchant ship Ems for Norddeutscher Lloyd. In WW II converted to German auxiliary cruiser Komet; 1942 sunk by planes and ships of Royal Air Force and Royal Navy.
- MS Oslofjord (1937) for Den norske Amerikalinje
- MV Mars (1939), cargo liner for Neptun Line.

=== Warships for the Kriegsmarine ===
- AG Weser, 1935–38; four Type 1934A-class destroyers, units Z5 – Z8
- AG Weser, 1936–39: six Type 1936-class destroyers, units Z17 - Z22
- AG Weser, 1938–41: eight Type 1936A-class destroyers, units Z23 - Z30
- AG Weser, 1940-43: four Type 1936A (Mob)-class destroyers, units Z31 - Z34
- AG Weser, 1941-44: three Type 1936B-class destroyers, units Z35, Z36 and Z43
- AG Weser, 162 U-boats of types VII, IX and XXI
- Seebeck AG, 16 U-boats
- AG Weser, 1939, Admiral Hipper-class cruiser Seydlitz; 95% completed but never on duty, intended rebuilding to auxiliary aircraft carrier cancelled, 1945 sunk in Königsberg
- AG Weser, 1939, Admiral Hipper-class cruiser Lützow; not completed, hull sold to Soviet Union, renamed first Petropavlovsk and then Tallinn; scrapped 1958
- AG Weser, 1938, H-class battleship J (no name); end of 1939 cancelled.
- AG Weser, 1939, H-class battleship K; construction not started.
