= USS LST-37 =

1943 LST-1-class tank landing ship

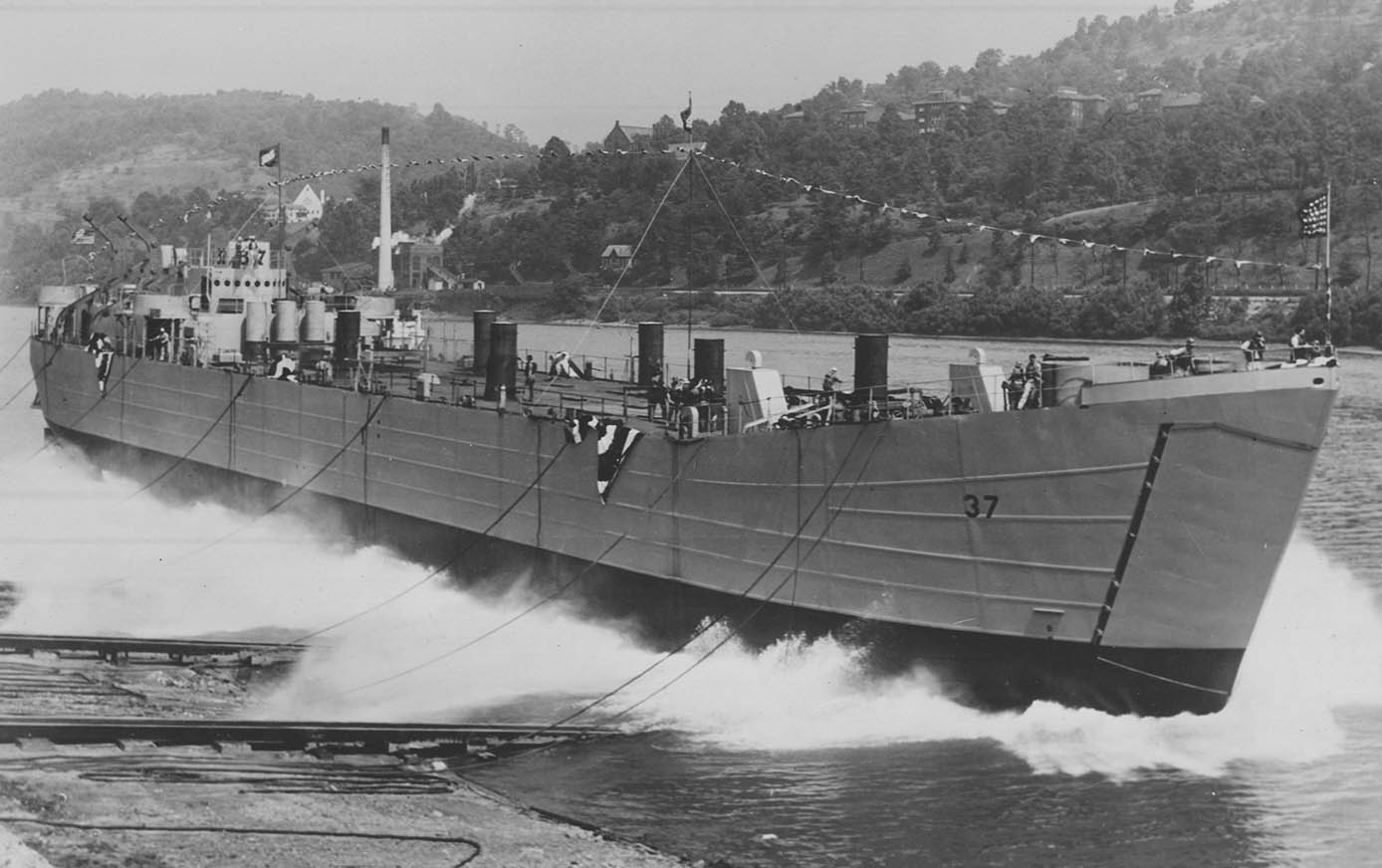
- Shipyard workers hang on as USS LST-37's hull tastes water for the first time as she is launched at the Dravo Corporation shipyard at Neville Island, Pennsylvania, 5 July 1943.

History

United States
- Name: LST-37
- Builder: Dravo Corporation, Pittsburgh, Pennsylvania
- Laid down: 1 April 1943
- Launched: 5 July 1943
- Sponsored by: Mrs. Jack Domb
- Stricken: 12 August 1948
- Identification: Hull symbol: LST-37
- Fate: Transferred to the Royal Hellenic Navy, 18 August 1943

Greece
- Name: LST-37
- Acquired: 18 August 1943
- Fate: Ran aground and sank, 1 June 1944

General characteristics
- Type: LST-1-class tank landing ship
- Displacement: 4,080 long tons (4,145 t) full load; 2,160 long tons (2,190 t) landing
- Length: 328 ft (100 m) oa
- Beam: 50 ft (15 m)
- Draft: Full load: 8 ft 2 in (2.49 m) forward; 14 ft 1 in (4.29 m) aft; Landing at 2,160 t: 3 ft 11 in (1.19 m) forward; 9 ft 10 in (3.00 m) aft
- Installed power: 2 × 900 hp (670 kW) Electro-Motive Diesel 12-567A diesel engines; 1,700 shp (1,300 kW)
- Propulsion: 1 × Falk main reduction gears; 2 × Propellers
- Speed: 12 kn (22 km/h; 14 mph)
- Range: 24,000 nmi (44,000 km; 28,000 mi) at 9 kn (17 km/h; 10 mph) while displacing 3,960 long tons (4,024 t)
- Boats & landing craft carried: 2 or 6 x LCVPs
- Capacity: 2,100 tons oceangoing maximum; 350 tons main deckload
- Troops: 16 officers, 147 enlisted men
- Complement: 13 officers, 104 enlisted men
- Armament: Varied, ultimate armament; 2 × twin 40 mm (1.57 in) Bofors guns; 4 × single 40 mm Bofors guns; 12 × 20 mm (0.79 in) Oerlikon cannons

USS LST-37 was an LST-1-class tank landing ship of the United States Navy built during World War II. She was transferred to the Royal Hellenic Navy on 18 August 1943, before being commissioned into the USN.

== Construction ==
LST-37 was laid down on 1 April 1943, at Pittsburgh, Pennsylvania by the Dravo Corporation; launched on 5 July 1943; sponsored by Mrs. Jack Domb; and transferred to the Hellenic Navy on 18 August 1943.

== Service history ==
LST-37 sailed from Galveston Bar for Key West, Florida, on 28 August 1943, with convoy HK 125, arriving in Key West, 1 September 1943.

On 11 October 1943, LST-37 left Halifax, Nova Scotia, in convoy SC 144, en route she joined convoy WN 497 that had departed Loch Ewe, on 26 October. She arrived in Methil, Scotland, on 28 October with a load of lumber.

Records do not indicate when LST-37 departed Methil, but she most likely sailed on 3 December 1943, in convoy EN 314 (series 2), arriving in Loch Ewe, on 5 December, with her sister ships USS LST-33, LST-34, and USS LST-36, because she departed Liverpool, England, in convoy OS 61/KMS 35, on 8 December 1943. The convoy split on 20 December 1943, with LST-37 continuing on in convoy KMS 35G, arriving in Gibraltar, on 21 December. She sailed for on in convoy KMS 35, the next day, for Bizerta, Tunisia. It is here that she ran aground on 1 June 1944, and sank.

== Bibliography ==
- "LST-37". Dictionary of American Naval Fighting Ships. Naval History and Heritage Command. 30 July 2015. This article incorporates text from this source, which is in the public domain.
- "LST-37". NavSource. 19 January 2018.
- "Convoy EN.314 (Series 2)". Arnold Hague Convoy Database.
- "Convoy HK.125". Arnold Hague Convoy Database.
- "Convoy KMS.35G". Arnold Hague Convoy Database.
- "Convoy OS.61/ KMS.35". Arnold Hague Convoy Database.
- "Convoy KMS.35". Arnold Hague Convoy Database.
- "Convoy SC.144". Arnold Hague Convoy Database.
- "Convoy WN.497". Arnold Hague Convoy Database.
