= British World War II destroyers =

At the start of World War II, the Royal Navy operated a range of destroyer classes. Some of these were legacies of World War I, some were designed during the inter-war years and the rest were the result of wartime experience and conditions. British-built and -designed vessels were also supplied to and built by allied navies, primarily the Australian and Canadian navies.

== Evolution ==
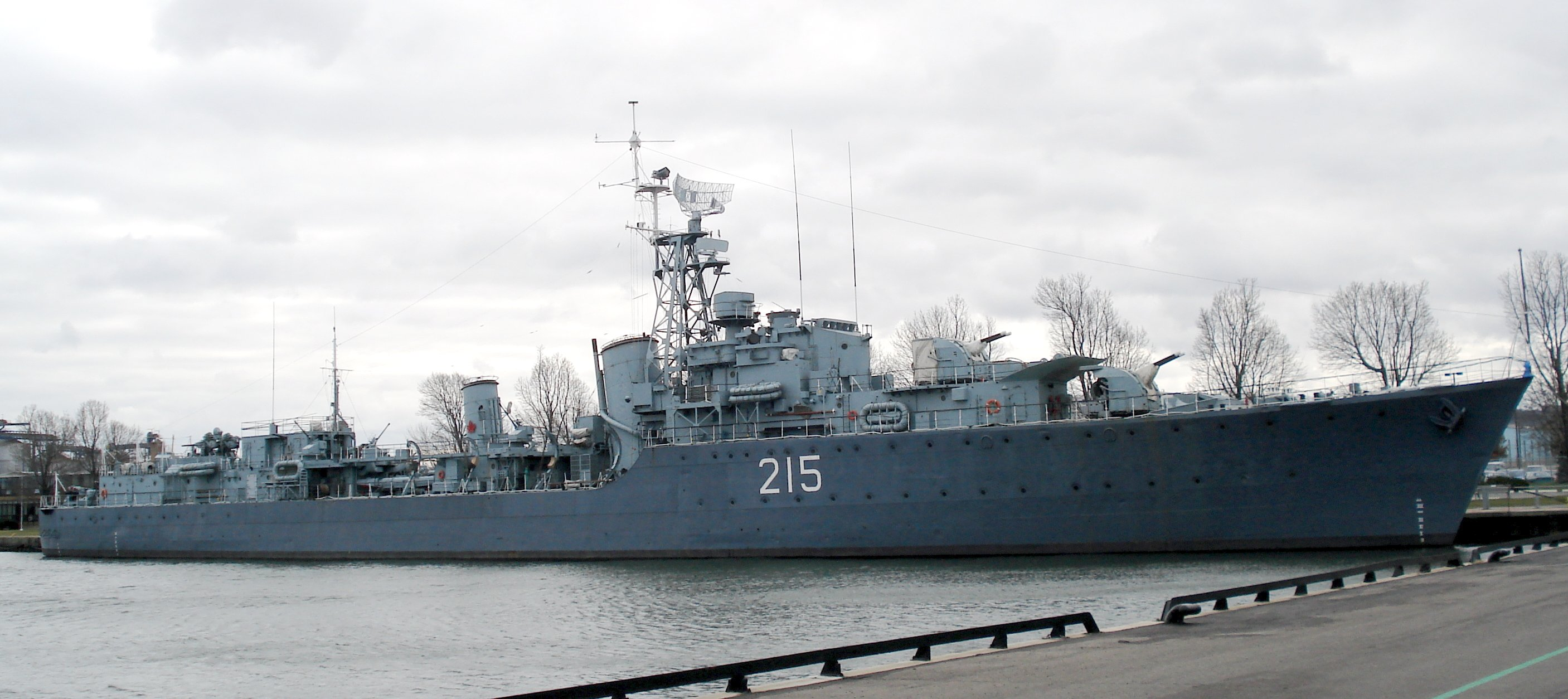
HMCS Haida, a Canadian Tribal-class destroyer

British destroyer flotillas were formed from single classes, with a slightly adapted flotilla leader; the aim had been to produce a flotilla each year. As a broad summary, British destroyers developed from the successful V and W-class destroyers of World War I, increasing in complexity until World War II. The Royal Navy then needed new ships quickly to increase numbers, replace losses and exploit experience and so design became simplified and cheaper to produce, with greater anti-aircraft and anti-submarine power (War Emergency Programme).

British destroyer design had developed with incremental changes in the inter-war years, apart from the larger Tribal-class destroyer which was not repeated. In 1937, there was a radical change in destroyer design with the production of the more complex J, K and N classes and the modified Ls and Ms. It was deemed to be a successful design, but was discontinued in favour of the a simpler War Emergency Programme design.

Later in the war, the Battle-class destroyer was developed, with a greatly enhanced anti-aircraft capability.

== Convoy escorts ==
British practice had been to produce fleet destroyers and to relegate older vessels to escort duties. This was unsatisfactory for several reasons. Firstly, the fleet destroyers' power plants were designed for the higher speeds required of the naval fleet: they were inefficient when used for convoy speeds. Secondly, fleet destroyer range was inadequate and this was exacerbated at convoy speeds; significant adaptations were necessary. Thirdly, armament did not address the air and submarine threats to convoys and essential inclusions affected stability. Lastly, there were insufficient units and the urgent need was more for numbers rather than quality of build.

This need was initially met by adapting elderly destroyers from the Royal Navy and the United States Navy. The Hunt-class destroyers, which were ordered from early 1939, were the first response by the Admiralty to the circumstances of convoy escort, but they were really suitable for just North Sea and Mediterranean Sea service. Later, new types of vessel were built for escort work in the North Atlantic - Flower and Castle-class corvettes, River, Loch and Bay-class frigates and Black Swan-class sloops.

== Weapon systems ==
The armament, naturally, reflected the changing circumstances of warfare and technological progress. At first, the destroyers were expected to escort, augment and protect the battleline, that is, the capital ships. This was reflected in the emphasis on the installation and development of anti-ship weaponry - guns and torpedoes. As a result, the "legacy" and inter-war classes were deficient in anti-submarine (ASW) and anti-aircraft (AA) weapon systems. The effect can be seen in the particularly high rate of loss to air attack in the early war years.

Attempts to resolve this resulted in both improved new ship designs and in modifications to existing ships. AA weapons were improved in number, power and fire control, with some classes equipped with main armament capable of AA use, even at the expense of reduced calibre. Secondary armament progressed from largely ineffective batteries of machine-guns and 2 pdr "pom-pom"s to Bofors and Oerlikon rapid-fire cannon, sometimes at the expense of torpedo tubes. Some classes were fitted with a single 3-inch (76 mm) AA gun, but this was unsatisfactory and discontinued. Effectiveness was further improved by improvements in fire control, such as the adoption of the Dutch Hazemeyer system.

At the outbreak of war, ASW weapons were limited to the depth charge and ASDIC (sonar). The weaknesses of this combination had been known before the start of the war, but the development of a replacement - the ahead-throwing weapon - had not been advanced with much urgency. The Hedgehog spigot mortar arrived in early 1943 and was fitted in older destroyers converted for convoy escort work. Hedgehog was followed by the Squid mortar later in the same year. Although it was trialled on HMS Ambuscade, it was rushed into service in Castle-class corvettes and Loch-class frigates and few destroyers received this weapon before the cessation of hostilities.

The effectiveness against surface threats was improved by new guns and the introduction of radar. Radar, in particular, gave British destroyers a decisive advantage such as in night actions against the Italian Regia Marina, enabling clear victories at Cape Bon and off Sfax. Gun mountings were developed to provide high angle, anti-aircraft capability and all round gun houses.

=== Guns ===
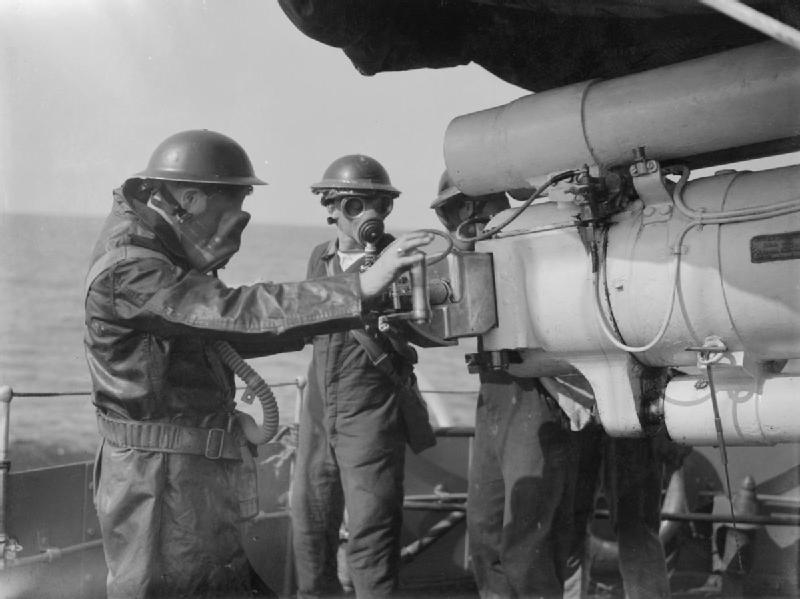
Gunners on destroyer HMS Broke, September 1940

- QF 4.7 inch - standard main battery weapon until supplanted by the QF 4.5 inch in mid-war. HA version not developed, so limited in its anti-aircraft use.
- QF 4.5 inch - an HA version was used to enable anti-aircraft use. Despite a smaller calibre, it used a heavier shell than the QF 4.7 inch.
- QF 4 inch Mk V - World War I dual-purpose gun and coastal defence gun
- QF 4 inch Mk XVI - dual-purpose gun, superseded the earlier QF 4 inch Mk V
- QF 12 pounder
- QF 6 pounder
- QF 2 pounder ("pom-pom")
- QF 40 mm (Bofors)
- QF 20 mm (Oerlikon)
- QF 0.5 inch (Vickers) - mounted as an anti-aircraft weapon but, in practice, ineffective.
- QF 0.303 (Lewis)

=== Torpedoes ===
- 21 inch Mark IX
- 21 inch Mark X
- 21 inch Mark XI

=== Anti-submarine ===
- Depth charges
- Hedgehog spigot mortar
- Squid mortar

== Actions ==
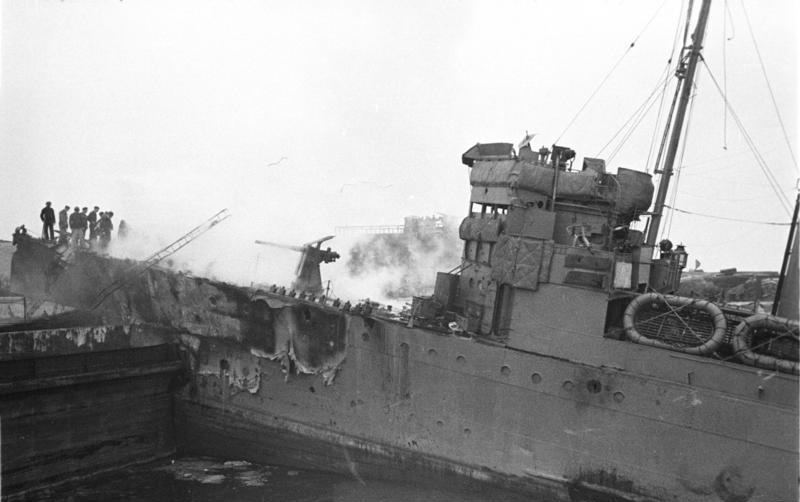
German photo of HMS Campbeltown, taken before it exploded after a raid on St Nazaire in 1942

It is impractical to give detail here of the entirety of British destroyer actions during the war. British destroyers were engaged in the Arctic, Atlantic, Pacific and Indian Oceans; the North and Mediterranean seas. Of the 389 Australian, British and Canadian destroyers involved in the war, over 150 were lost or damaged beyond repair. They were used to defend and escort convoys and the fleet, to perform aggressive operations against enemy merchant and naval ships, to act as transports and to deliver bombardments in support of armies. Here, however, is a sample of significant and famous actions:

=== Battle of Cape Bon, 1941 ===
The British 4th Destroyer Flotilla — four destroyers (HMS Sikh, HMS Maori, HMS Legion and the Dutch destroyer Isaac Sweers) - intercepted and sank the Italian light cruisers Alberto di Giussano and Alberico da Barbiano. The action took place off Cape Bon, Tunisia.

=== Capture of U-110, 1941 ===
While escorting convoy OB318, HMS Bulldog captured U-110 and, critically, its top-secret Enigma cipher machine and documentation.

=== St. Nazaire Raid, 1942 ===
The Town-class destroyer HMS Campbeltown, the former USS Buchanan, was adapted to resemble a German destroyer and, loaded with troops and tons of explosive, rammed and destroyed a strategically important dry dock in St Nazaire.

=== Battle of North Cape, 1943 ===
The sinking of German battleship Scharnhorst by an Allied force that included HMS Savage, Saumarez, Scorpion, HNoMS Stord, HMS Opportune, Virago, Musketeer and Matchless.

=== Sinking of Haguro, 1945 ===
The Japanese cruiser Haguro was intercepted by the 26th Destroyer Flotilla (HMS Saumarez, Verulam, Venus and Virago) and sunk 55 miles (89 km) off Penang, on 16 May 1945.

== Legacy classes ==
=== V and W ===
The V and W-class destroyers had been ordered from 1916 onwards in response to increasing German specifications and to provide vessels capable of operating in poor weather with the fleet. By year's end, 25 Vs and 25 Ws had been ordered. Compared with the earlier M and R classes, the Vs and Ws were larger with better freeboard and increased armament, initially four or five 4-inch (102 mm) gun mountings and four or six torpedo tubes.

It was learnt that the Germans would mount 5-inch (127 mm) guns, so the 4.7-inch (120 mm) gun mount was adopted for sixteen further ships that were ordered in 1918, the "modified V & Ws".

Although still in service in the 1930s, these were no longer frontline units, but necessity saw thirty-nine adapted for escort duties in World War II.

=== Town ===
The fifty Town-class destroyers were elderly American destroyers transferred to the Royal Navy and the Canadian and Norwegian navies in an Anglo-American Destroyers-for-bases deal that preceded Lend-Lease. They comprised three Caldwells, twenty Clemsons and twenty-seven Wickes, dating from World War I.

Like the Vs and Ws, adaptations were required for escort work. They were unpopular with officers, who found them relatively unmanoeuvrable, and with crews, whose accommodation was both cramped and damp. Nonetheless, they filled a need at a critical time.

== Inter-war classes ==
From 1930, the Royal Navy commissioned one destroyer flotilla each year, at first with eight ships plus a slightly larger flotilla leader. Additional ships were built as required for sale abroad. The convention was to assign a letter to each class, ships' names starting with that letter, except for the leader.

HMS Amazon and HMS Ambuscade were launched in 1926 and they were the prototypes for the following nine classes (A to I) launched between 1929 and 1941. The classes J to N, 40 ships launched between 1938 and 1940, were more complex, with heavier armament and expensive to build. The pattern was cut short by the need for numbers of basic ships arising from the hard lessons of war.

The Tribal-class destroyers broke with the incremental evolution of the inter-war classes. They were larger ships designed to match the heavier destroyers built by several other navies.

=== A and B ===
The A class was the first full class of the inter-war years and reckoned to be a successful design for their time. A full flotilla of nine was built for the Royal Navy, between 1928 and 1931, plus two more for the Royal Canadian Navy (RCN). Eight were lost during the war.

They displaced 1,350 tons and they could attain 35 knots (65 km/h; 40 mph). Main armament was four 4.7-inch QF Mark IX guns, in single mounts, and eight 21-inch (533 mm) torpedo tubes. Anti-aircraft weaponry consisted of one of the unsatisfactory 3-inch (76 mm) Mark II 20 cwt QF gun and two 2-pounder Mark II pom pom guns. Thirty depth charges were carried.

A near copy of the As, the B class nine ship flotilla was built between 1929 and 1931. Five were lost.

They were only slightly larger than the A class, 1,360 tons (standard). The original kit of four 4.7-inch and eight 21-inch torpedo tubes was reduced before the start of the war to three and four respectively, to boost anti-submarine (ASW) capability. Anti-aircraft weaponry varied in the class, four Oerlikon 20 mm cannon being installed on some ships.

=== C and D ===
Two nine ship flotillas were planned. Only five C-class ships were built and all were transferred to the RCN. Two were lost during the war, one accidentally rammed by the cruiser HMS Calcutta. A third was also accidentally destroyed after the war.

All nine D-class ships were commissioned into the Royal Navy. One was later transferred to the RCN. These had a greater ASW capability designed in, at the expense of minesweeping. Only two, including the Canadian ship survived the war.

Ships of both flotillas retained all of their four 4.7s, as well as the 3-inch and 'pom pom' anti-aircraft guns. In addition, eight 12.7 mm machine guns were fitted.

=== E and F ===
Two nine-ship E and F-class destroyer flotillas were built. The Es were built between 1931 and 1934 and the Fs one year later. One E-class ship was transferred to the RCN and another to the Royal Hellenic Navy (Greece). Three, including the Greek and Canadian ships, survived the war. Two F-class ships were transferred to the RCN; five survived the war, one survivor was sold to the Dominican Republic.

These two flotillas were substantially a continuation of the design, maintaining the full 4.7-inch gun and torpedo weaponry, but with variations for secondary armament. The engine room compartmentation was an improvement over the C and D classes.

=== G and H ===
Another pair of flotillas, the G and H-class destroyers continued the gentle evolution of the design with a revised engine room layout. Only two of nine G-class ships survived the early war years and they were transferred to the RCN and the Polish Navy during the war.

Twenty-four Hs were built. In addition to the nine originally ordered for the Royal Navy, two were delivered to the Greek Navy, seven to the Argentinians and six more, ordered by Brazil, were bought for British use. One ship was transferred to Canada. Five survived the war. One of the Greek ships was captured by the Germans and used by them in the Mediterranean.

The six requisitioned Brazilian ships are sometimes referred to as the Havant class. The Brazilians subsequently built their own, the Acre-class destroyers, based on the H class but with 5-inch guns supplied by the United States.

Two of the Hs had a modified bridge arrangement arising from the use of a new and taller gun mounting. The new design became the standard.

=== I ===
Nine I-class destroyers were ordered for the Royal Navy, plus four more for Turkey. Two of the Turkish ships were bought by the British and two were delivered.

They repeated the preceding G-class destroyers, ten torpedo tubes, instead of eight.

=== Tribal ===
The Tribal-class destroyers were a one-off class built as a response to the large destroyers of Germany, France and Italy. Two eight ship flotillas were built for the Royal Navy and another flotilla for the RCN (four ships completed post-war). Three more Tribals were built in Australia for the RAN.

They were built with four twin 4.7-inch mountings, later reduced to three to accommodate additional AA weaponry.

=== J, K and N ===
The J-, K- and N-class destroyers were a new destroyer design, larger and more powerfully armed than their predecessors. Twenty-four vessels were ordered, in three eight ship flotillas, built between 1937 and 1942.

The standard displacement was increased from around 1,350 tons (classes A to I) to around 1,700 tons, length by 30 feet (9.1 m) to more than 355 feet (108 m). The engine room layout was made more compact, despite vulnerability to complete engine failure by a single well-placed hit. The basic strength of these ships was derived through longitudinal members instead of the earlier transverse ones. The design was deemed sturdy, compact and successful and provided the basis for the following classes.

The four single 4.7-inch guns were increased to three twin mountings (originally four twins), and two five tube banks of torpedo tubes. The anti-aircraft weaponry was not significantly improved, however, and this was a serious flaw. In 1940 and 1941, the anti-aircraft establishment was increased in all ships. Their after torpedo tubes were landed and replaced with a single 4-inch gun on a high angle mounting. The ineffective 0.5 inch machine guns were replaced with single 20 mm Oerlikon guns, and another pair were added on the searchlight platform, amidships. Further modifications took place in 1942, upgrading the single Oerlikons and reinstating the aft torpedo tubes. The radar installations were frequently enhanced during the ships' service.

=== L and M ===
The new King George V-class battleships were faster than their predecessors and needed escorts that could match them, with an adequate margin. The L and M-class destroyers were the response, achieving 35 knots. To protect gun crews from the anticipated wetness, the Admiralty specified enclosed gun houses. These were, however, slow to build and so the first four L class, were fitted with twin 4-inch in Mark XVI mountings, as already in use on the Hunt-class escort destroyers and elsewhere. The remaining Ls and the following Ms (near copies) received the intended twin 4.7 inch (119 mm) guns.

In total, there were eight of each class.

== Foreign-built destroyers ==
At the start of the war, or afterwards, the Royal Navy acquired vessels designed and built for foreign navies, in foreign shipyards. These were mainly of U.S. origin - the Town class described above, but there were also numbers of French and Dutch destroyers. Ships designed built for foreign navies in Britain are described under the relevant class.

=== Dutch ===
The six Dutch ships were old designs of pre–World War I vintage. Most were used as submarine tenders and all were scrapped before the war's end.

=== French ===
Six modern French destroyers of the La Melpomène class and two older Bourrasque-class ships were acquired. One was lost in bad weather in December 1940 and the remainder were returned to France in 1945.

=== German ===
One German destroyer, Z38, was ceded to Britain after the end of the war and renamed HMS Nonsuch. It was scrapped in 1949. In general, German designs were intended for short-range duties in the North and Baltic seas and were unsuited to ocean duties by limited range and wetness in heavy seas.

== War time designs ==
=== Hunt ===
The Hunt-class destroyers was a class of escort destroyer of the Royal Navy. The first vessels were ordered early in 1939, and the class saw extensive service in the Second World War, particularly on the British east coast and Mediterranean convoys. They were named after British fox hunts. The modern Hunt-class mine countermeasures vessels maintain the Hunt names lineage in the Royal Navy.

Although the Hunt-class destroyers had their origin before war started, experience caused the design to be changed, resulting in four different types.

=== War Emergency Programme ===
The classes O to Cr met the utilitarian need: smaller ships than their predecessors with reduced main gun firepower but more suitable for convoy escort, anti-submarine warfare and anti-aircraft defence.

==== O and P ====
The O and P-class destroyers were two classes of destroyers of the Royal Navy. Ordered in 1939, they were the first ships in the War Emergency Programme, also known as the 1st and 2nd Emergency Flotilla, respectively. They served as convoy escorts in World War II, and some were subsequently converted to fast second-rate anti-submarine frigates in the 1950s.

Preceding classes had been costly in terms of money, time and tonnage. A "basic" pattern was developed to perform with the fleet and to react to the growing threat from air attack. The O and P-class destroyers were ordered to meet this brief, some with high-angle (HA) 4-inch guns to supplement the secondary anti-aircraft Oerlikons.

==== Q and R ====
The Q and R-class destroyers were two classes of sixteen War Emergency Programme destroyers ordered for the Royal Navy in 1940 as the 3rd and 4th Emergency Flotilla. They served as convoy escorts during World War II. Three Q-class ships were transferred to the Royal Australian Navy upon completion, with two further ships being handed over in 1945. Roebuck had the dubious honour of being launched prematurely by an air raid at Scotts shipyard in Greenock, her partially complete hulk lying submerged in the dockyard for nine months before it was salvaged and completed.

==== S and T ====
The S and T-class destroyers were two classes of sixteen destroyers of the Royal Navy launched in 1942–1943. They were built as two flotillas, known as the 5th and 6th Emergency Flotilla, and they served as fleet and convoy escorts in World War II.

The S-class destroyers were a development of the "War Standard" with HA 4.7-inch guns, twin Bofors 40 mm guns (in place of the earlier "pom-poms"), with the Dutch designed Hazemeyer fire control system and increased depth charge capacity.

==== U and V ====
The U and V-class destroyers were two classes of sixteen destroyers of the Royal Navy launched in 1942–1943. They were constructed in two flotillas, each with names beginning with "U-" or "V-" (although there was a return to the pre-war practice of naming the designated flotilla leader after a famous naval figure from history to honour the lost ships Grenville and Hardy). The flotillas constituted the 7th Emergency Flotilla and 8th Emergency Flotilla, built under the War Emergency Programme. These ships used the Fuze Keeping Clock HA Fire Control Computer.

==== W and Z ====
The W and Z-class destroyers were two classes of sixteen destroyers of the Royal Navy launched in 1943–1944. They were constructed as two flotillas, with names beginning with "W-" and "Z-", respectively, although, like the preceding U and V class, two of the flotilla leaders were named after historical naval figures (as had been Royal Navy practice during the inter-war years). They were known as the 9th and 10th Emergency Flotilla, respectively and served as fleet and convoy escorts in World War II. None were lost during World War II but INS Eilat (originally HMS Zealous) was sunk during the Israel-Egypt conflict in October 1967 by Egyptian missile boats.

==== C ====
The C-class destroyers was a class of 32 destroyers of the Royal Navy that were launched from 1943 to 1945. The class was built in four flotillas of 8 vessels, the "Ca", "Ch", "Co" and "Cr" groups or sub-classes, ordered as the 11th, 12th, 13th and 14th Emergency Flotillas respectively. The sub-class names are derived from the initial two letters of the member ships' names, although the "Ca" class were originally ordered with a heterogeneous mix of traditional destroyer names. A fifth flotilla, the "Ce" or 15th Emergency Flotilla, was planned but were cancelled in favour of the Weapon-class destroyers after only the first two ships had been ordered. The pennant numbers were all altered from "R" superior to "D" superior at the close of World War II; this involved some renumbering to avoid duplication.

=== Battle ===
Battle-class destroyers were designed to provide improved anti-aircraft defence on a platform with improved stability. The early war years had exposed the weakness of the inter-war designs in this respect and there had been serious losses to air attack. As a result, the Battle-class vessels were significantly larger (effectively successors to the Tribals) and incorporated stabilisers; the main battery was four 4.5-inch (114 mm) guns on two twin high-angle mountings, supported by fourteen 40 mm Bofors cannon. The superstructure was so arranged as to maximise the fields of fire.

The design authorised for 1942 was actively debated even after construction had been started. As a result, later ships were sufficiently modified to form a separate sub-class - the "1943 Battle class". In addition, two enlarged ships were ordered, with a rearranged engine room layout and capacity for a third twin 4.5-inch turret.

Two eight ship flotillas were ordered of the original "1942" design and four flotillas of the later "1943" design. In the event, construction and completion were slow, due in part to the unavailability of equipment. As the outcome of the war became assured, the need for warships declined and the numbers of the two Battle types was reduced to a total of twenty-four ships. Only one saw action in the Pacific.

=== Weapon ===
The Weapon-class destroyers was a class of destroyers built for the Royal Navy towards the end of World War II. They were the smaller counterpart to the Battle class (which followed them) and were the first new destroyer designs for the Royal Navy since the Second World War Emergency Programme. 20 ships were planned, of which only 13 were laid down and 7 were launched, but the cessation of hostilities resulted in only 4 being completed for service. Two of the ships had been previously ordered (as Celt and Centaur) as part of the planned C class, or 15th Emergency flotilla, of 1944, but the orders were changed to the new design.

== Casualties ==
During the war, 153 British, Canadian and Australian destroyers were lost.

Losses by year
1939	1940	1941	1942	1943	1944	1945	Total
3	37	22	51	18	20	2	153

Loss by cause
	Surface forces	Submarine	Mines	Aircraft	Shore defences	Marine accident & unknown	Total
Cause	22	33	26	55	2	15	153

== Gallery ==
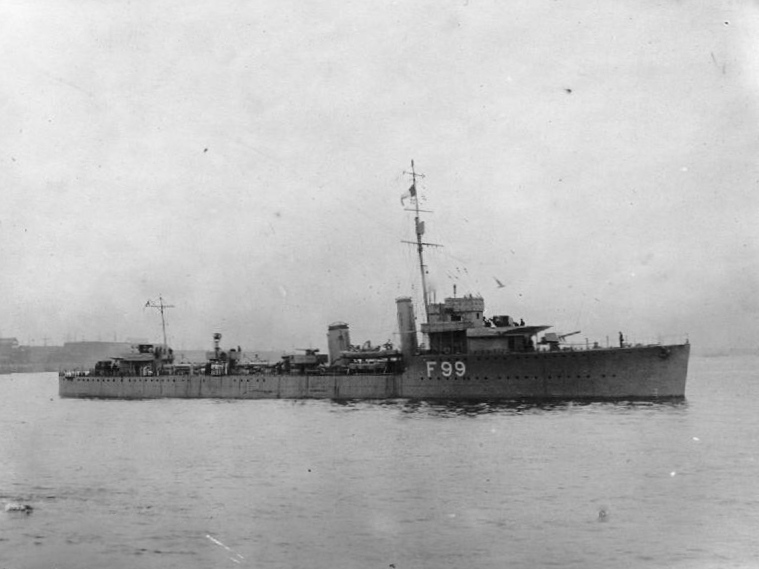
World War I V and W-class destroyer

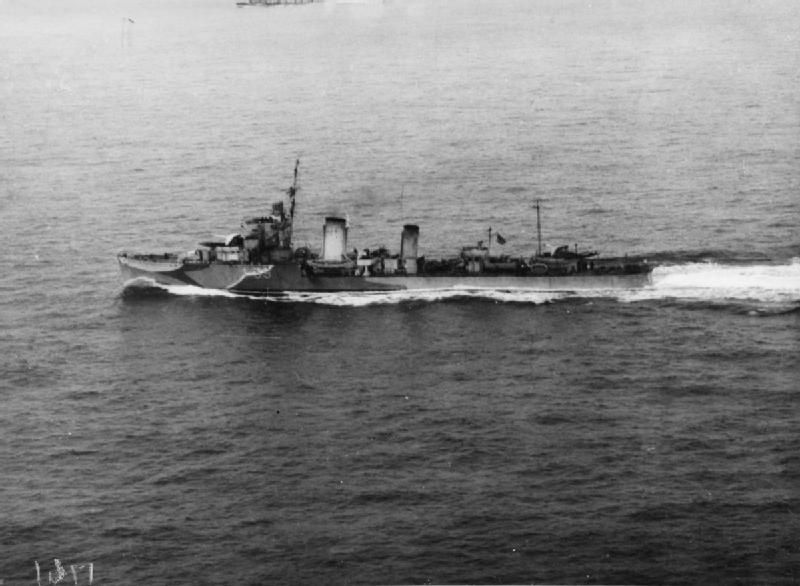
HMS Amazon

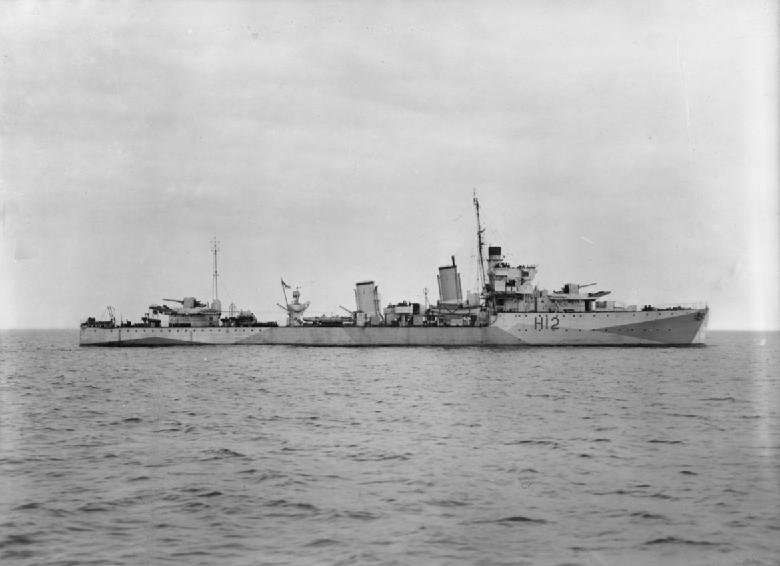
A- and B-class destroyer

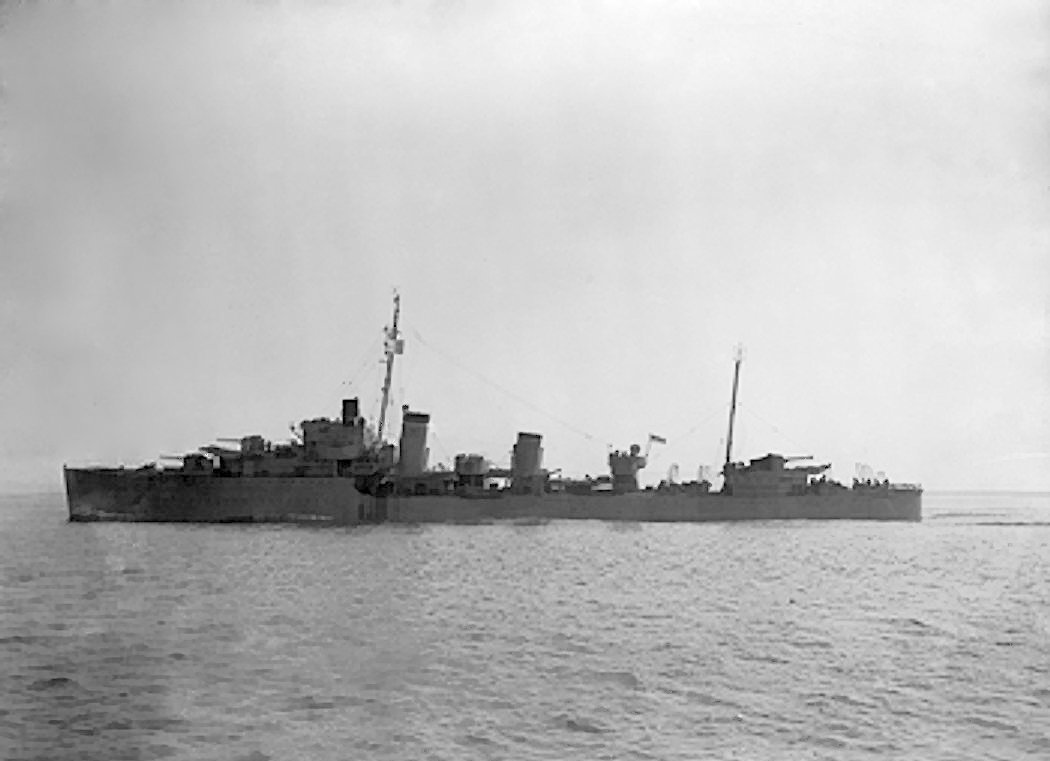
C and D-class destroyer

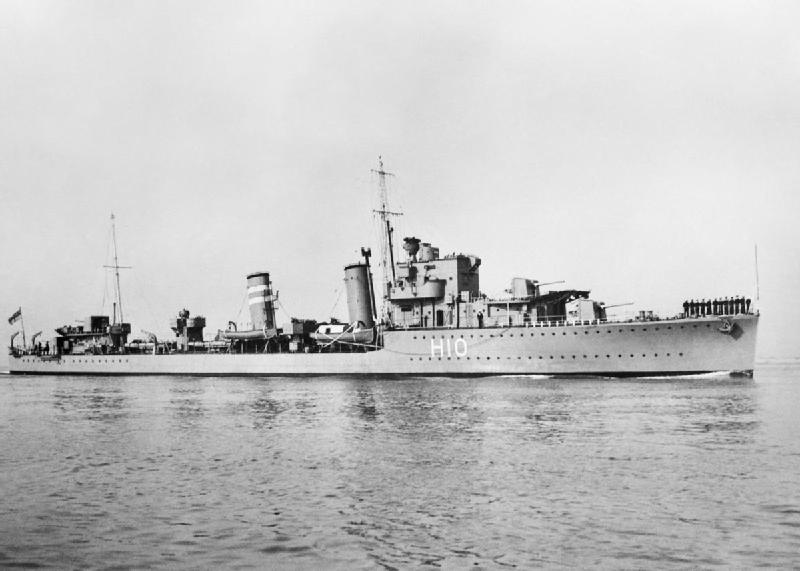
E and F-class destroyer

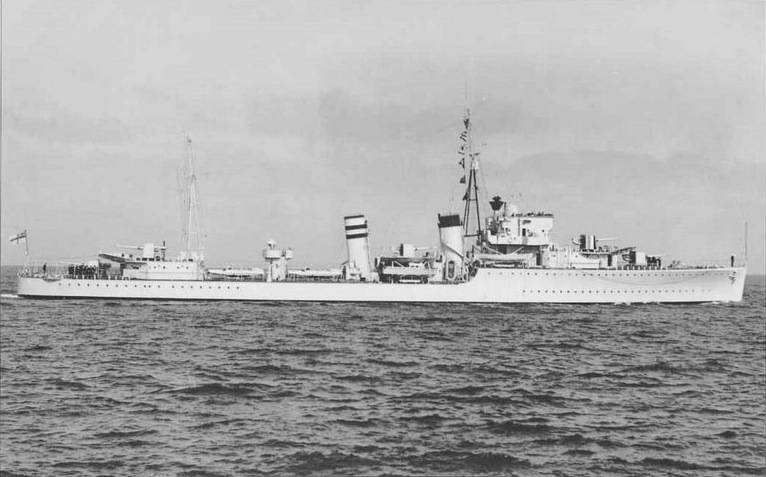
G and H-class destroyer

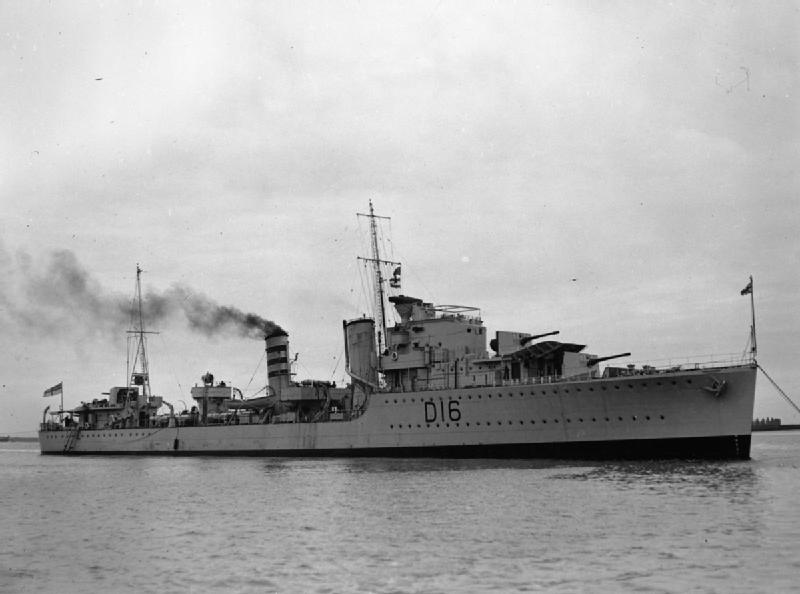
I-class destroyer

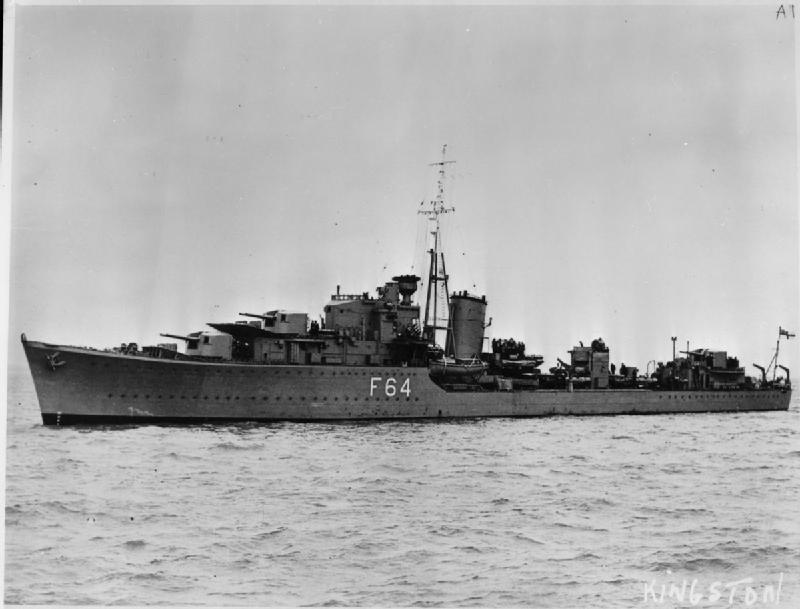
J-, K- and N-class destroyer

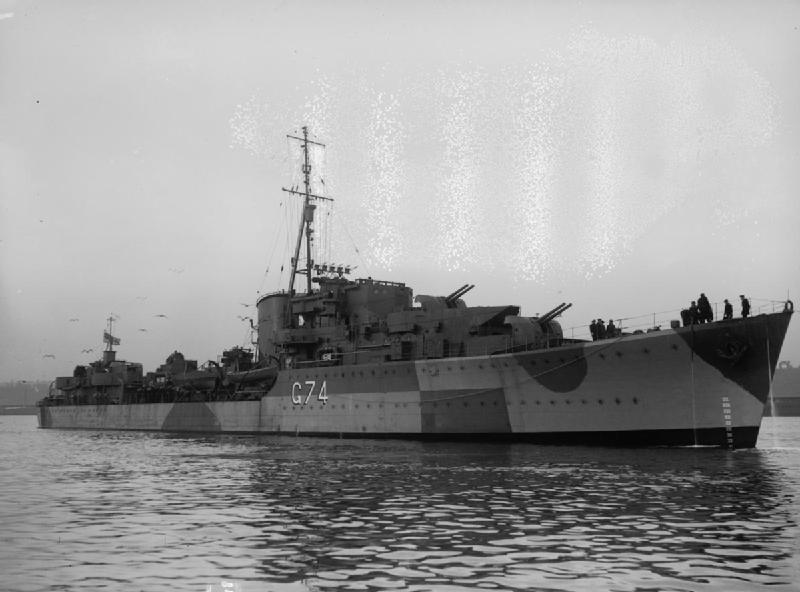
L and M-class destroyer

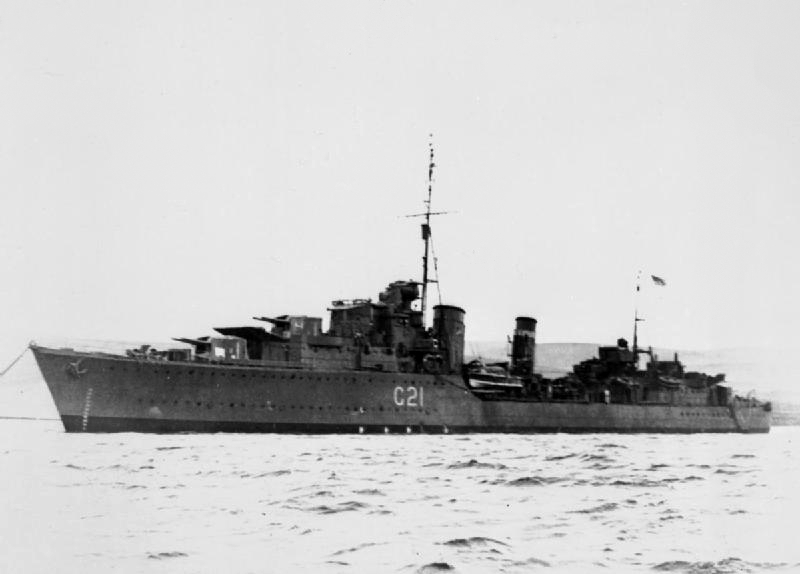
Tribal-class destroyer

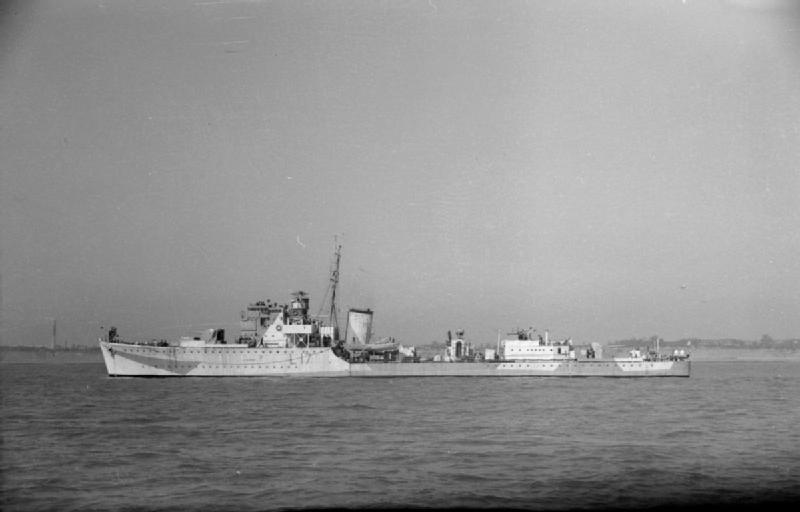
Type I Hunt-class destroyer

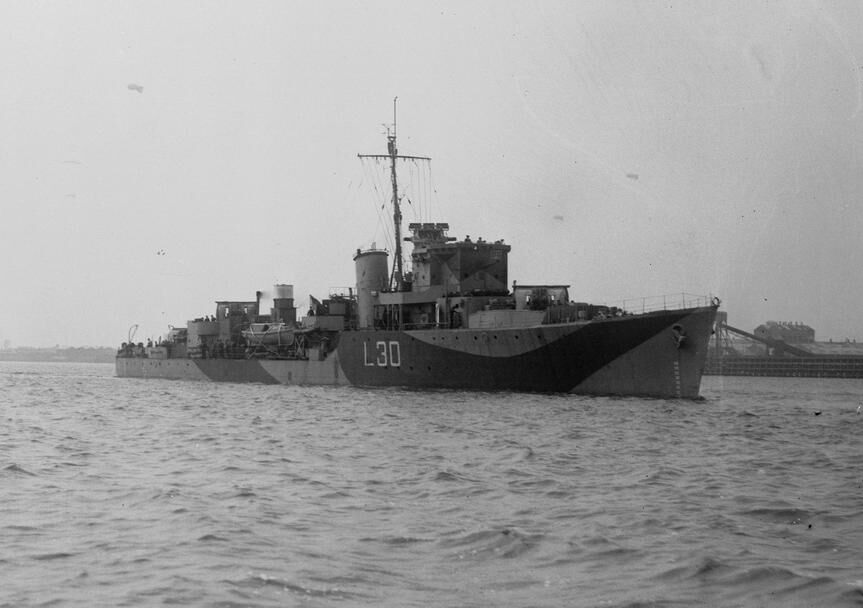
Type II Hunt-class destroyer

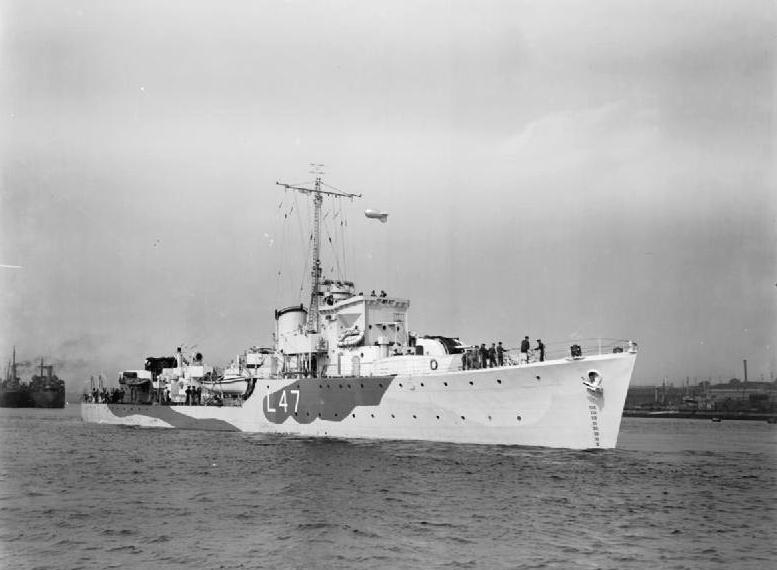
Type III Hunt-class destroyer

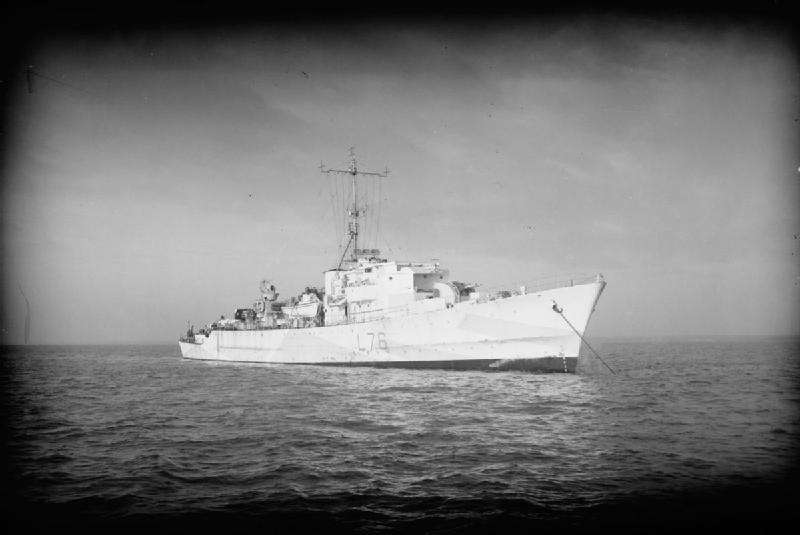
Type IV Hunt-class destroyer

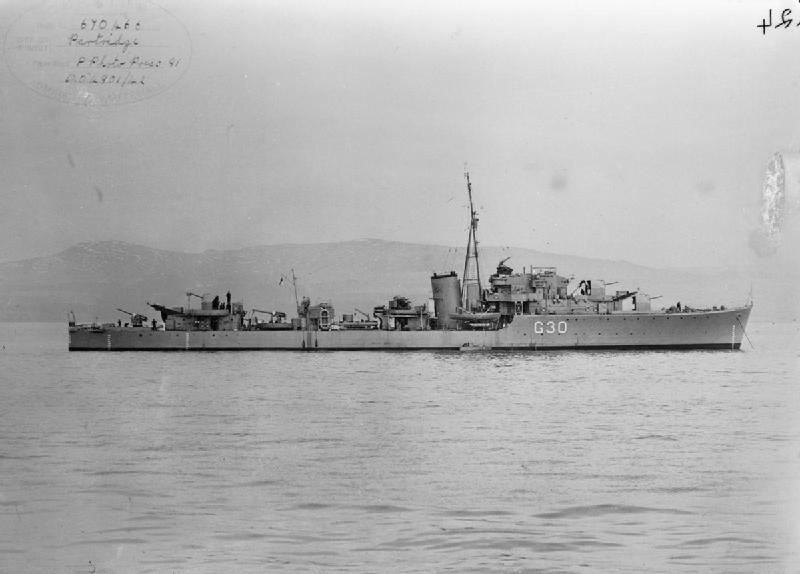
O and P-class destroyer

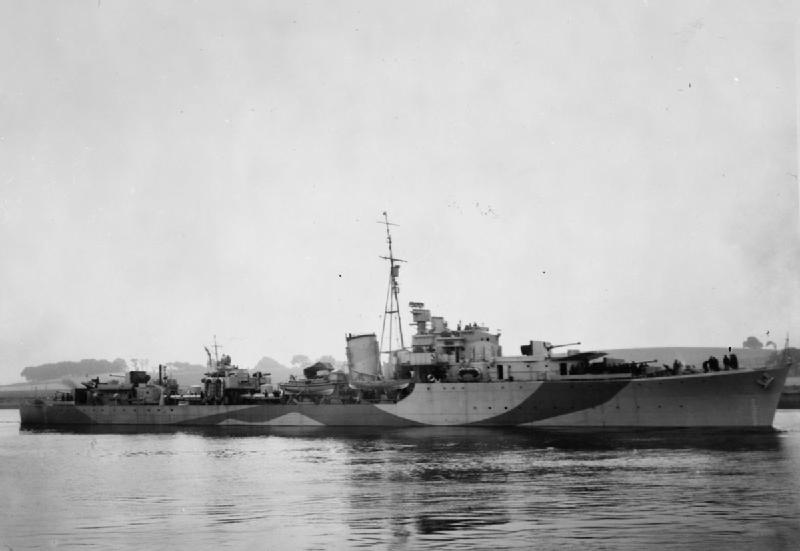
Q and R-class destroyer

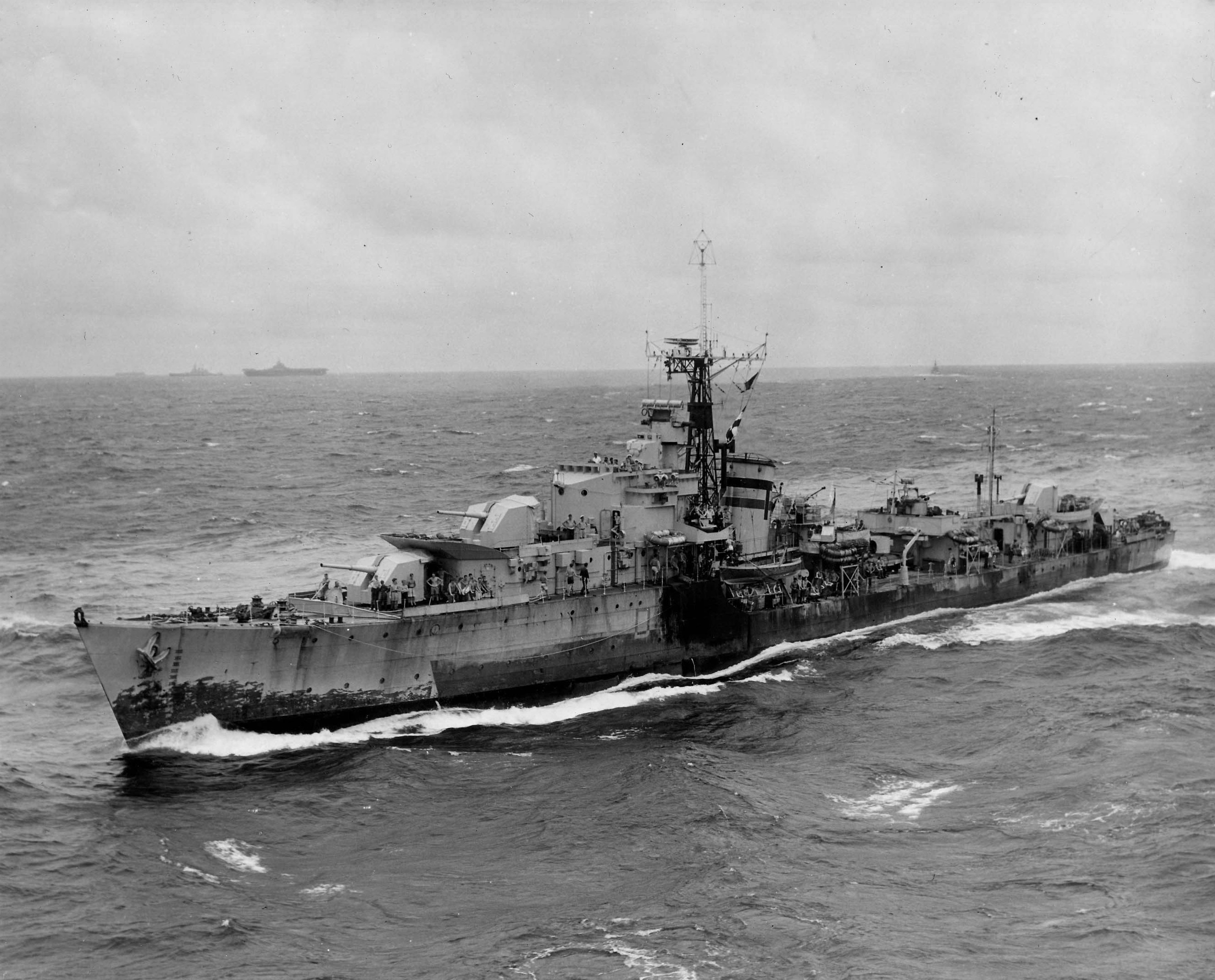
S and T-class destroyer

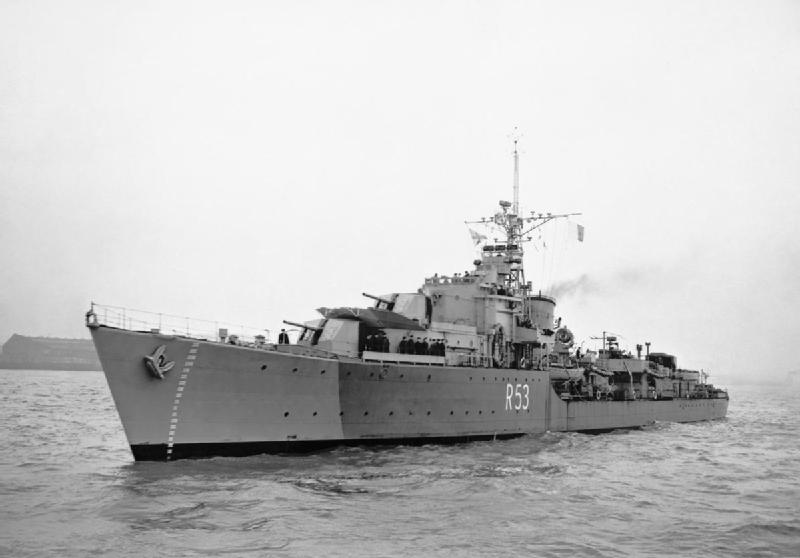
U and V-class destroyer

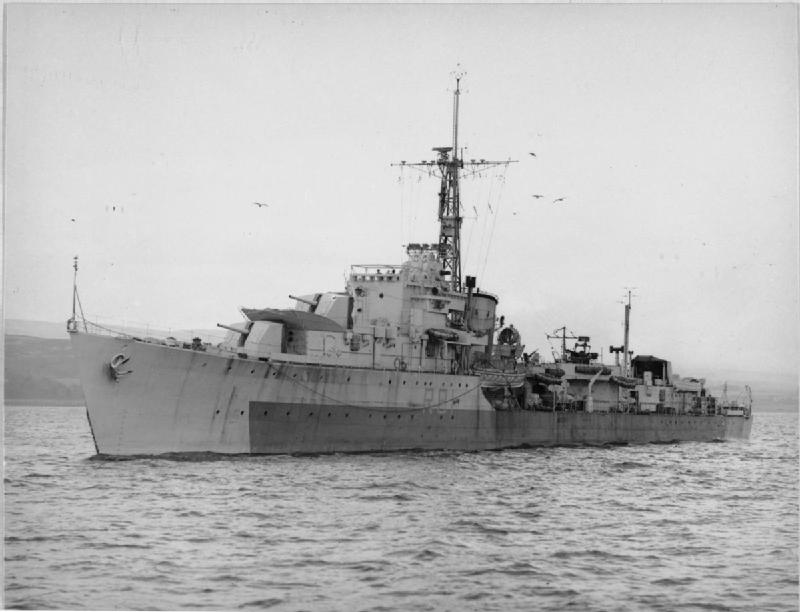
W and Z-class destroyer

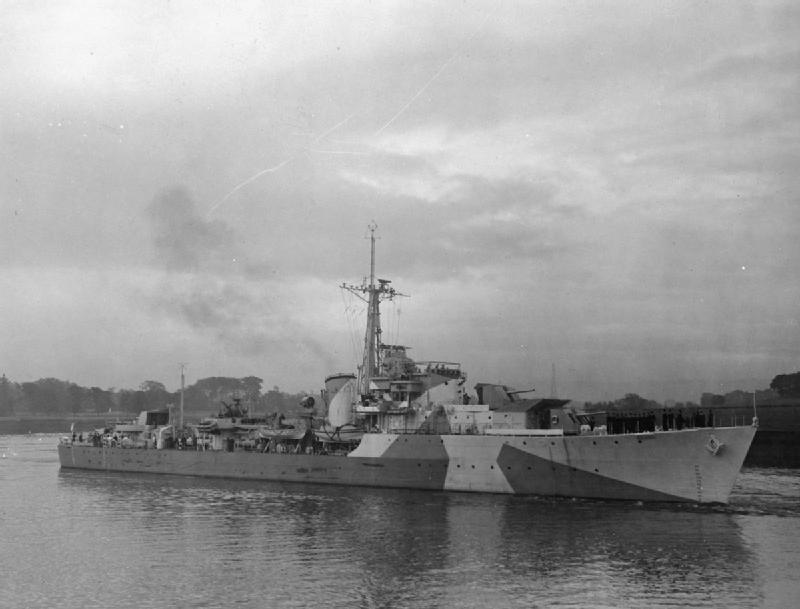
C-class destroyer

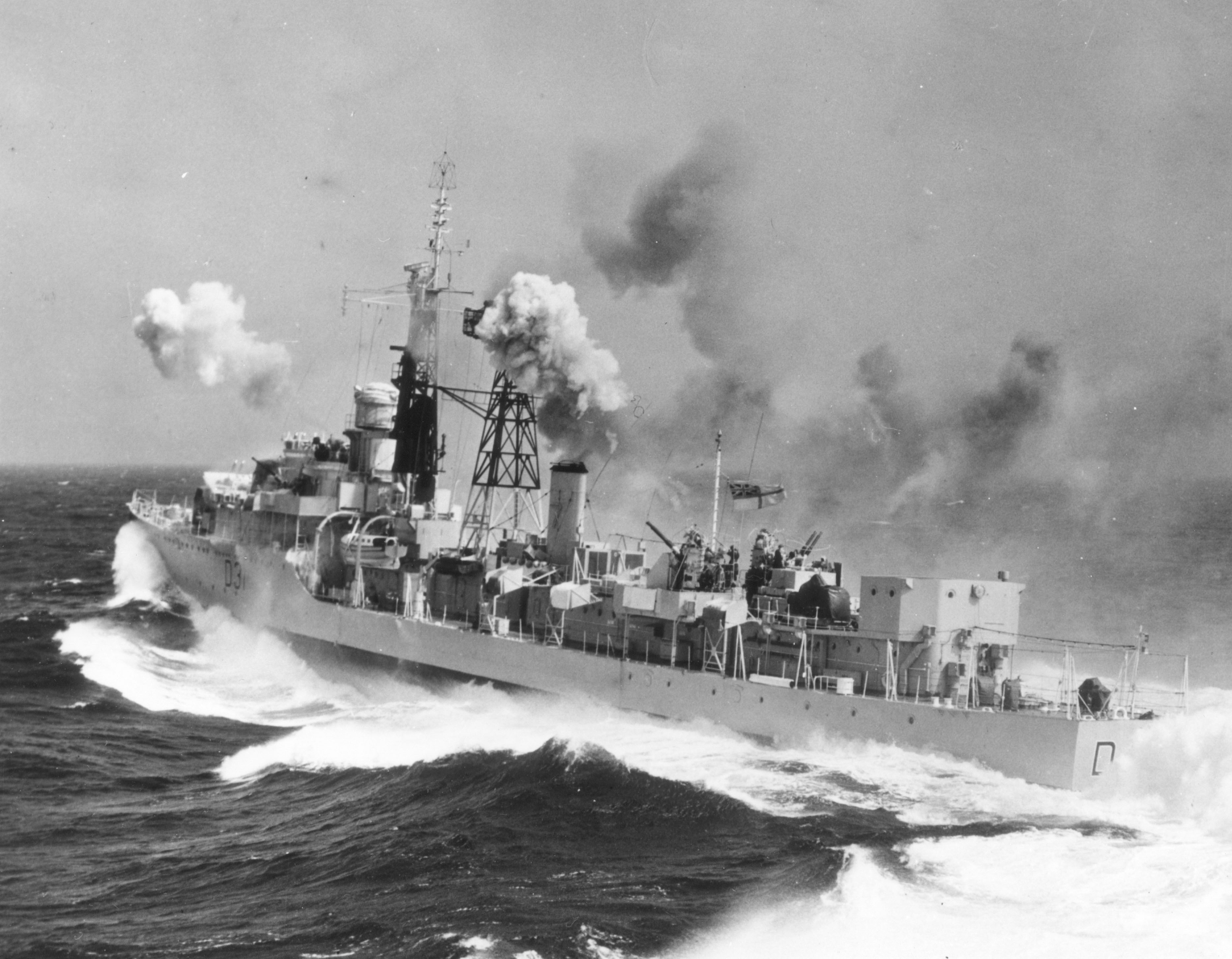
Weapon-class destroyer

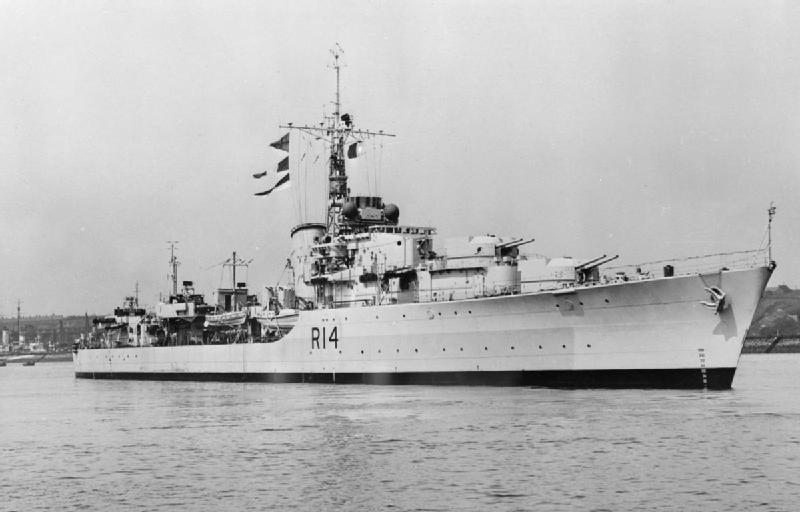
Early Battle-class destroyer

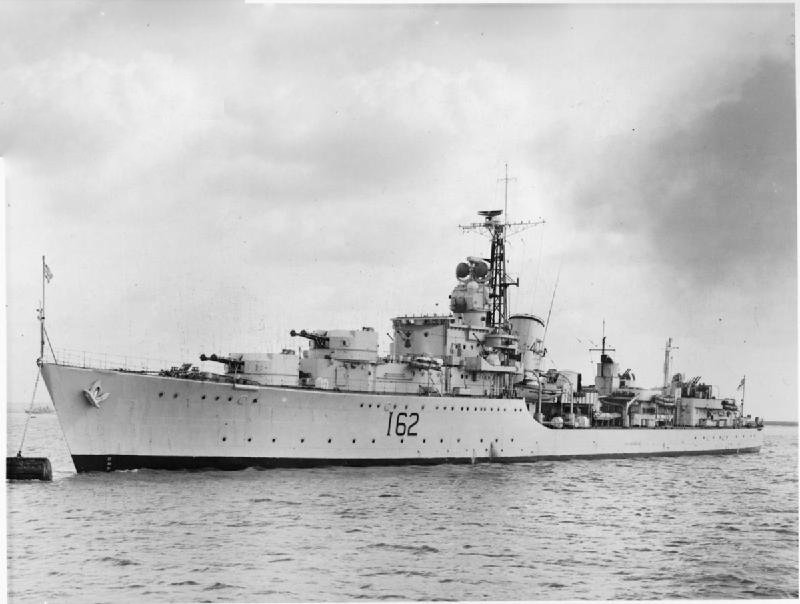
Later Battle-class destroyer

== See also ==
- List of destroyer classes of the Royal Navy
- Naming conventions for destroyers of the Royal Navy
