= German destroyer Z38 =

Destroyer

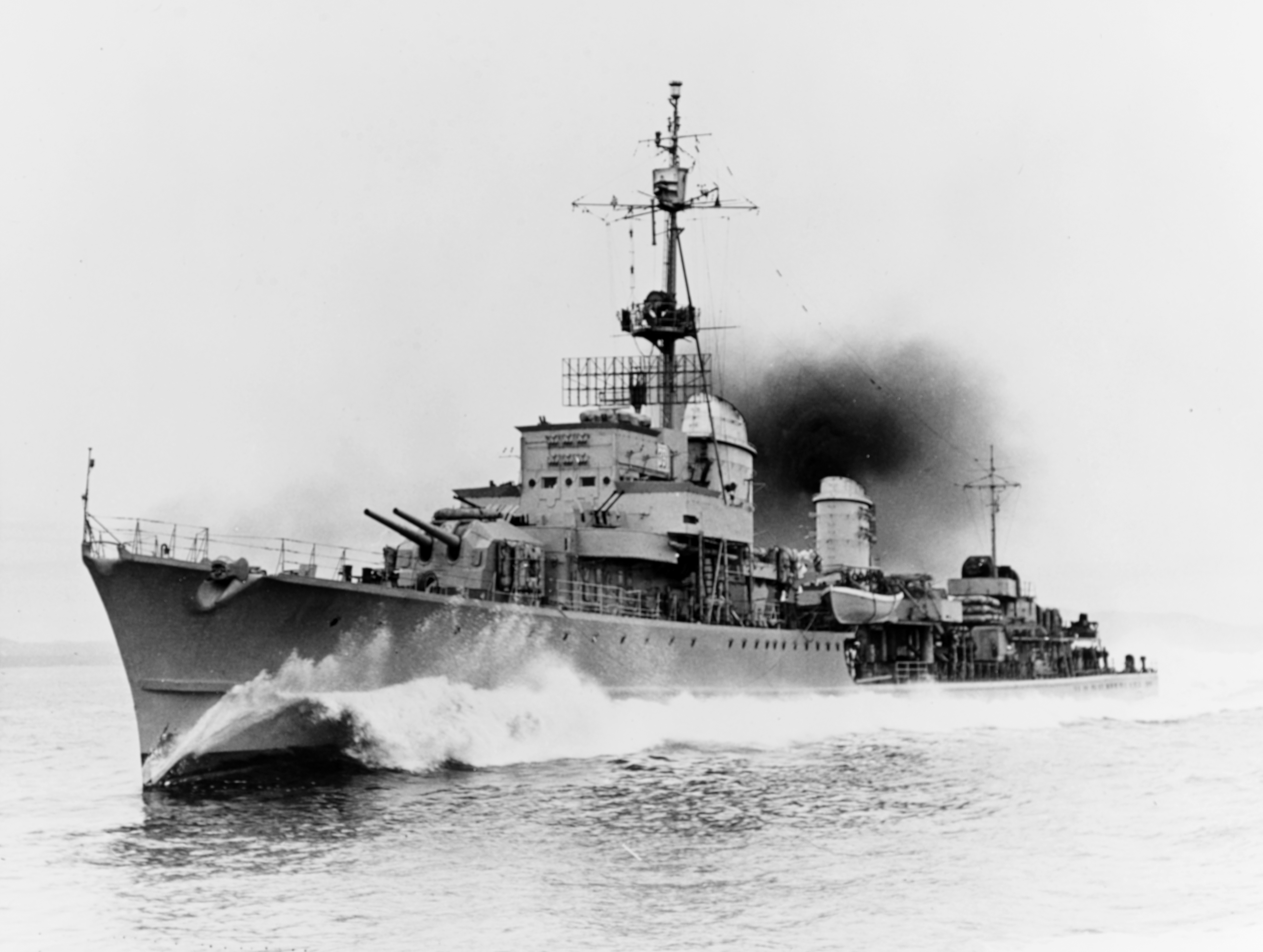
- Z38's sister ship, Z39, underway under American control, 1945

History

Nazi Germany
- Name: Z38
- Ordered: 19 September 1939
- Builder: Germaniawerft, Kiel
- Yard number: G628
- Laid down: 15 April 1940
- Launched: 15 August 1941
- Completed: 20 March 1943
- Captured: May 1945
- Fate: Transferred to the Royal Navy, September 1945

United Kingdom
- Name: Nonsuch
- Acquired: September, 1945
- Out of service: September, 1948
- Fate: Sold for scrap, 8 November 1949

General characteristics (as built)
- Class & type: Type 1936A (Mob) destroyer
- Displacement: 2,519 long tons (2,559 t) (standard); 3,691 long tons (3,750 t) deep load
- Length: 127 m (416 ft 8 in) o/a
- Beam: 12 m (39 ft 4 in)
- Draft: 4 m (13 ft 1 in)
- Installed power: 70,000 PS (51,000 kW; 69,000 shp); 6 × water-tube boilers
- Propulsion: 2 × shafts; 2 × geared steam turbine sets
- Speed: 38.5 knots (71.3 km/h; 44.3 mph)
- Range: 2,293 nmi (4,247 km; 2,639 mi) at 19 knots (35 km/h; 22 mph)
- Complement: 332
- Armament: 1 × twin, 3 × single 15 cm (5.9 in) guns; 2 × twin 3.7 cm (1.5 in) AA guns; 10 × single 2 cm (0.8 in) AA guns; 2 × quadruple 53.3 cm (21 in) torpedo tubes; 60 mines

Z38 was a Type 1936A (Mob) destroyer built for the Kriegsmarine during World War II. She was laid down in 1941, and completed two years later. Her anti-aircraft armament was modified heavily under Project Barbara. She served with the 4th Destroyer Flotilla her entire time under German service, and spent much of her life escorting task forces, patrolling, laying mines, and bombarding land forces. She served in the Baltic briefly in 1943, before being reassigned to the Arctic area around Norway from 1943 to 1945, and then serving in the Baltic again in 1945.

After the war, she was taken by the Royal Navy, renamed Nonsuch, the sixth ship of her name. She was used for extensive machinery trials, before being used to test a 500-kilogram (1,100 lb) charge, which broke her keel and flooded her. She was too damaged to refloat, and instead sold to Arnott Young & Co., on 8 November 1949, to be scrapped.

== Background ==
=== Interbellum ===
Following the end of World War I Germany signed the Treaty of Versailles, which put strict limits both on the size and displacement of warships that she could possess. During the Interbellum, the period between the first and second world wars, the average size of Allied ships and their armaments in almost all warship categories grew substantially. As a result of the treaty, Germany felt that her ships could not compete with those of the Allied navies and began to ignore the treaty, at first covertly, and later openly after Hitler, the Führer (dictator) of Nazi Germany, publicly denounced it in March 1935. The displacements of all German ships at the time were purposefully understated to have their official sizes comply with the treaty. At first, these changes were made with the goal of being able to match or exceed French and Polish destroyers, but later it was necessary that these destroyers be able to match British destroyers, a much more difficult goal.

Due to the comparatively small number of German shipyards, compared to the British or French, Germany adopted a policy of over-arming her destroyers to compensate for their low numbers, so that they bore similar armament to French and Polish light cruisers. Several negative consequences resulted from this, such as making them slower and overweight. Although German heavy destroyers matched British light cruisers in armament, they were much less seaworthy and had far worse facilities for control and use of their guns.

=== Plan Z ===
Plan Z was a German naval rearmament plan that started in 1939, and involved building ten battleships, four aircraft carriers, twelve battlecruisers, three pocket battleships, five heavy cruisers, forty-four light cruisers, sixty-eight destroyers, and 249 submarines. These ships were to form two battle fleets: a "Home Fleet" to tie down the British war fleet in the North Sea, and a "Raiding Fleet" to wage war upon British convoys. Erich Raeder, the Grand Admiral of the Kriegsmarine, was assured by Hitler that war would not start until at least 1945. Raeder had wanted the deadline for the completion of Plan Z to be extended to 1948, but Hitler insisted on 1945, although Hitler privately wanted to be at war with the Anglo-French alliance by 1942. World War II began in 1939, meaning that very few of Germany's heavy ships would be finished at that point. Germany's main naval opponents were France and England. Compared to the number of ships Germany had upon entry into the war (in parentheses) they had: 22 battleships (two), seven carriers (none), 22 heavy cruisers (four), 61 light cruisers (six), 255 destroyers (34), 135 submarines (57, of which less than half could actually serve in the Atlantic or the North Sea). Due to the clear advantage her enemies had, Raeder remarked that the Kriegsmarine could not hope to win, and thus the only course for them was to "die valiantly".

=== Destroyer function ===
The function of the destroyer was defined by its evolution: around the 1870s, nations that could not directly threaten Great Britain's navy began to invest in torpedo boats, small and agile ships which used their torpedoes to deliver enough damage to pose a tactical issue to enemy fleets. Near the turn of the 20th century, British and German torpedo boats grew in size to the point of creating a separate line of sea-going torpedo craft, "torpedo boat destroyers", or simply destroyers, designed in part to counter torpedo boats themselves. Experience in World War I showed that destroyers very rarely engaged capital ships, but more often fought other destroyers and submarines; because of this, destroyers were partially re-focused towards escort and anti-submarine services. During the war, they were used as "maids of all work", fulfilling virtually every role to some degree, and, unlike capital ships, which rarely left port during the war, served in numerous operations. By the end of the war, destroyers were perceived as one of the most useful classes of ships.

During World War II, destroyers served essentially the three basic functions they had in World War I: to act as screening ships to defend their fleets from those of an enemy, to attack an enemy's screening ships, and to defend their fleet from submarines. However, there was an increased desire to introduce anti-aircraft measures to the destroyers, although many nations struggled to do so effectively. How destroyers were actually used varied by country. Germany did not use her destroyers to defend against submarines, hence their lack of strong anti-submarine armament. Germany relied on a massive fleet of trawlers that had been requisitioned and refitted as minelayers instead. British destroyers were built for escorting fleets, defending them from enemy planes and sinking submarines. German destroyers were built to escort fleets, or act as torpedo boats. The role of the destroyer began to vary more widely as World War II progressed, with five parallel evolutions: the all-purpose destroyer (all countries), the anti-submarine destroyer (United States and United Kingdom), the anti-aircraft destroyer (Japan and the United Kingdom), the small destroyer (Germany and Italy), and the super-large destroyer (France).

== Design and armament ==
Z38 was 121.9 metres (400 ft) long at the waterline and 127 metres (417 ft) long overall, had a beam of 12 metres (39 ft), a freeboard of 6.6 metres (22 ft), and a draft of 4 metres (13 ft). She had a displacement of 3,083 long tons (3,132 t) at standard load, and 3,691 long tons (3,750 t) at full load. She had a complement of 332. She had 15 watertight compartments, and carried 825 tonnes (812 long tons; 909 short tons) of oil.

Before her Project Barbara modifications, Z38 was armed with a twin 15-centimetre (5.9 in) L/48 gun in a turret forward (200 rounds of ammunition), three single 15 cm (5.9 in) L/48 guns in a gunhouse on her aft (600 rounds), ten 2 cm (0.8 in) (20,000 rounds), four 3.7 cm (1.5 in) anti-aircraft guns (8,000 rounds), two quadruple 53.3 cm (21 in) torpedo tubes, and 60 mines. After her modifications, she carried sixteen 2 cm guns and six 3.7 cm guns, and the rest of her armament was unchanged.

Her propulsion system consisted of six Wagner boilers feeding high-pressure superheated steam (at 70 atm (1,029 psi; 7,093 kPa) and 450 °C (842 °F)) to two sets of Wagner geared steam turbines. These gave the ship a rated power of 70,000 PS (51,000 kW; 69,000 shp), and a top speed of 38.5 knots (71.3 km/h; 44.3 mph). She had a range of 2,239 nautical miles (4,147 km; 2,577 mi), at her cruising speed of 19 knots (35 km/h; 22 mph).

Z38 was fitted with a FuMO 21 radar on her bridge, and four FuMB 4 Sumatra aerials were placed around the searchlight platform on her foremast. She had a degaussing coil around her forecastle.

== Service history ==
Z38 was ordered on 19 September 1939; was laid down by Germaniawerft in Yard G628 in Kiel in 1941; was launched on 5 August 1941, and was commissioned on 20 March 1943. Z38 was immediately assigned to the 4th Destroyer Flotilla.

In August 1943 Z38 served as a practice torpedo retrieval boat for the training cruisers Nürnberg and Emden. On 24 September Z38 travelled from Sassnitz to Trelleborg, to escort Lützow during Operation Hermelin, alongside German destroyers Z5 Paul Jacobi, Z14 Friedrich Ihn, Z15 Erich Steinbrinck, and Z27.

On 22 October Z38 left Swinemünde for Kaafjord. On 25 December, a task force, under the command of Rear Admiral Erich Bey, made up of the German battleship Scharnhorst, and destroyers Z29, Z30, Z33, Z34, and Z38, were ordered to intercept Convoy JW 55A, which was made up of 19 ships. On 26 December Bey formed a patrol line using his destroyers. After ordering the destroyers back to base, Scharnhorst was located by British cruisers, who opened fire upon her. During the ensuing Battle of North Cape, Scharnhorst was sunk by the British fleet, including the British battleship Duke of York.

From 30 to 31 May 1944 Z29, Z33, Z34, and Z38 formed a patrol line between Bear Island and the North Cape. Between 30 June and 1 July Z29, Z31, Z33, Z34, and Z38, sortied to Bear Island. On 31 July German battleship Tirpitz, Z29, Z31, Z33, Z34, and Z38 sailed into the Arctic Ocean from Altafjord, for exercises. From 21 to 31 October Z29, Z31, Z33, Z34, and Z38, covered the evacuation of the Mountain Corps Norway unit, from around Murmansk to Norway. From 6 to 17 November Z31, Z33, Z34, and Z38 covered German forces retreating from Tanafjord.

On 22 January 1945 Z31, Z34 and Z38, laid mines in Magerøya, Laafjord, and Brei Sounds. On 25 January Z31, Z34, and Z38 sailed out of Tromsø, making for the Baltic. On 28 January while off the Sognefjord the three destroyers were intercepted by a squadron of British ships, including the light cruisers Diadem, and Mauritius. During the battle, one of Z38's funnels caught fire, splitting a boiler tube. After this Z38 broke off from the battle, and made for Kiel alongside Z34. Once there Z38 received 200 coastal artillerymen, to be taken to Gotenhafen.

From 16 to 20 February Z34, Z38, T5, and T6 escorted the passenger liner SS Hamburg to Sassnitz. On 22 February Z38 escorted the German steamer Deutschland to Sassnitz. On 18 and 19 February Z38, alongside German cruiser Admiral Scheer, destroyer Z43, and minelayers T28 and T35, bombarded Soviet 39th Army positions, near Peyse and Gross-Heydekrug, on the south coast of Samland. On 23 February Z38, Z43, and T28 bombarded these locations again. At one point during this, while between Königsberg and Fischhausen, Z38 and T8 became icebound, and were freed by tugs. From 4 to 6 March Z38 bombarded Soviet armour and positions near Wollin, before taking refugees from Pillau to Gotenhafen. On 7 March Z35, Z38, and T28 escorted the steamship Pretoria to Copenhagen. On 13 March after returning to Gotenhafen Z38 bombarded Großendorf. For the rest of March Z38 was controlled by the Wehrmacht (German army), rather than the Kriegsmarine. On 4 April her upper deck was damaged in an air raid. On 5 April Z38 became involved in a battle off Oxhöfter Kämpe. On 9 April Z38 escorted German cruisers Lützow and Prinz Eugen from the Bay of Danzig to Swinemünde. From 28 April to 4 May Z38 helped defend the Dievenow channel of the Oder river.

On 3 May Z38 and Z39 escorted the battleship Schlesien, which had hit a mine near Greifswalder Oie, to Swinemünde. On 4 May Z38 picked up refugees from Swinemünde, and made way for Copenhagen. On the same day, Z38 and T33 rescued the crew of the training ship Hektor, which had been heavily damaged in an air raid. On 7 May Z38 returned to Swinemünde and transported more refugees to Copenhagen. On 8 May Z6, Z10, Z14, Z20, Z25, Z38, Z39, T17, T19, T23, T28, and T33 set sail from Hela to Glücksburg, with 20,000 soldiers and civilians, arriving on May 9. On 9 May Z38 arrived at Kiel, after delivering her War Diary to the commanding officer's house off of Flensburg Förde. On 8 May Z38 was decommissioned. At some point after her decommissioning, Z38 was sailed by a mixed German and British crew to Wilhelmshaven, and then, on 6 July 1945 Z38 sailed for Portsmouth, to be used as a trial vessel. Her German crew remained on board until 22 September 1946.

While in British service, Z38 was renamed Nonsuch, the eleventh of her name, and used for testing purposes. Z38 was originally given the pennant number R40, but this was later changed to D107. After arriving in England, Z38 was used for various trials and evaluations in the Firth of Clyde, before being laid up in the Portchester creek. In October 1946 it was decided that Z38 was to be commissioned for extensive machinery trials, at the same time as being used as an air target ship under the Commander-in-Chief, Rosyth. In January 1947 Z38 was at full complement, and expected to enter service in June of the same year, in order to relieve HMS Fernie as an air target ship. In September 1948 Z38 was scheduled to be paid off into a reserve fleet, after her trials were finished in mid-October.

In December of that year, it was decided that Z38 would be scrapped, after showing off her auxiliary machinery to British shipbuilders, and removing certain equipment. However, in March 1949 Z38 was instead used for ship target trials, replacing Kimberley. After this decision was made, Z38 was disarmed and then towed to Loch Striven. In October 1949, Z38 was placed over a 500-kilogram (1,100 lb) charge, which was then detonated. The explosion threw up a plume of water that was 250 feet (76 m) high, and broke her keel approximately 1.6 seconds after the explosion. Her second boiler room flooded almost immediately, and the other two gradually filled with water. Z38 was then beached, and after inspection shown to be too damaged to refloat, and so it was decided that Z38 was to be handed over directly to shipbreakers while still beached.

On 8 November 1949 Z38 was sold to Arnott Young & Co Ltd for scrapping. By August 1950, the shipbreakers had removed the damaged section, and refloated her after-end. The after-end was taken to the breakers yard in Dalmuir for further inspection, but the fore-end was broken up as it was laid on the beach.
