= Greek destroyer Vasilefs Georgios =

Greek lead ship of Vasilefs Georgios-class

Coordinates: 36°46′N 10°21′E

- Vasilefs Georgios

History

Greece
- Name: Vasilefs Georgios (ΒΠ Βασιλεύς Γεώργιος)
- Namesake: King George I of Greece
- Ordered: 29 January 1937
- Builder: Yarrow & Company, Scotstoun
- Laid down: February 1937
- Launched: 3 March 1938
- Commissioned: 15 February 1939
- Fate: Scuttled, 20 April 1941

Nazi Germany
- Name: ZG3
- Commissioned: 21 March 1942
- Renamed: Hermes, 22 August 1942
- Fate: Scuttled, 7 May 1943; Salvaged, 1943, then scrapped after 1945

General characteristics (as built)
- Class & type: G and H-class destroyer
- Displacement: 1,371 t (1,349 long tons) (standard); 1,879 t (1,849 long tons) (deep load)
- Length: 97.5 m (319 ft 11 in) (o/a)
- Beam: 9.7 m (31 ft 10 in)
- Draft: 2.7 m (8 ft 10 in)
- Installed power: 34,000 shp (25,000 kW); 3 Admiralty 3-drum boilers
- Propulsion: 2 shafts; 2 geared steam turbines
- Speed: 36 knots (67 km/h; 41 mph)
- Range: 3,760 nmi (6,960 km; 4,330 mi) at 20 knots (37 km/h; 23 mph)
- Complement: 162
- Armament: 4 × single 12.7 cm (5 in) guns; 4 × single 3.7 cm (1.5 in) AA guns; 2 × quadruple 1.27 cm (0.5 in) AA machine guns; 2 × quadruple 53.3 cm (21 in) torpedo tubes; 2 × depth charge launchers and 1 depth charge rack

Vasilefs Georgios (Greek: ΒΠ Βασιλεύς Γεώργιος) (King George) was the lead ship of her class of two destroyers built for the Royal Hellenic Navy before the Second World War. Flagship of the navy's Destroyer Flotilla, she participated in the Greco-Italian War in 1940–1941, escorting convoys and unsuccessfully attacking Italian shipping in the Adriatic Sea. While under repair during the Axis invasion of Greece in 1941, Vasilefs Georgios sank when the floating drydock that she was in was either scuttled or sunk by German aircraft.

The ship was later salvaged and repaired by the Germans who commissioned her into the Kriegsmarine (German Navy) in 1942 as ZG3, later renaming her as Hermes. They generally used the ship to escort convoys to and from North Africa and islands in the Aegean Sea. In addition, the Germans occasionally used the ship to lay mines and to ferry troops and supplies. After Hermes was transferred to the Central Mediterranean, she sank a British submarine about a week before she was crippled by Allied aircraft in late April 1943. The ship was towed to Tunisia and was scuttled as a blockship shortly before the Allies occupied Tunisia in early May. They refloated the wreck and it was scrapped after the war.

== Design and description ==
The Vasilefs Georgios-class ships were derived from the British G-class destroyers, modified with German guns and fire-control systems. They had an overall length of 98.4 meters (322 ft 10 in), a beam of 10.05 meters (33 ft 0 in), and a draft of 2.51 meters (8 ft 3 in). They displaced 1,371 metric tons (1,349 long tons) at standard load and 1,879 metric tons (1,849 long tons) at deep load. The two Parsons geared steam turbine sets, each driving one propeller shaft, were designed to produce 34,000 shaft horsepower (25,000 kW) using steam provided by three Admiralty three-drum boilers for a designed speed of 36 knots (67 km/h; 41 mph). During her sea trials on 30 October 1938, Vasilefs Georgios reached a speed of 36.6 knots (67.8 km/h; 42.1 mph) from 35,109 shp (26,181 kW), although her armament was not yet installed. The ships carried a maximum of 399 metric tons (393 long tons) of fuel oil which gave a range of 3,760 nautical miles (6,960 km; 4,330 mi) at 20 knots (37 km/h; 23 mph). Their crew consisted of 162 officers and crewmen. (Note: Sources differ for the specifications for these ships. Gröner and Koop and Schmolke generally agree on a designed displacement of 1,437 t (1,414 long tons) and a deep displacement of 2,122 t (2,088 long tons) with an overall length of 101.2 m (332 ft 0 in). Curiously, they give a waterline length of 98.5 m (323 ft 2 in) which is very close to Whitley's figure for the overall length. They give figures of 10.4 m (34 ft 1 in) for the beam and also credit the ships with Yarrow boilers. They state that the fuel capacity was 465 t (458 long tons), giving a range of 4,800 nmi (8,900 km; 5,500 mi) at 19 kn (35 km/h; 22 mph). Freivogel states that the displacement figures given by Gröner and Koop and Schmolke are after the ship was salvaged and repaired. No source mentions any significant rebuilding or modifications by the Germans, other than to the armament, so Whitley has been used here as he presumably had better access to the builder's records.) Unlike her sister ship Vasilissa Olga, Vasilefs Georgios was fitted out to accommodate an admiral and his staff.

The ships carried four 12.7-centimeter (5.0 in) SK C/34 guns in single mounts with gun shields, one pair each superfiring forward and aft of the superstructure. Her anti-aircraft (AA) armament consisted of four 3.7-centimeter (1.5 in) guns in four single mounts amidships and two quadruple mounts for Vickers 0.5 in (12.7 mm) AA machineguns. The Vasilefs Georgios class carried eight above-water 53.3-centimeter (21 in) torpedo tubes in two quadruple mounts. They had two depth charge launchers and a single rack for their 17 depth charges.

== Construction and service ==
=== In Greek service ===
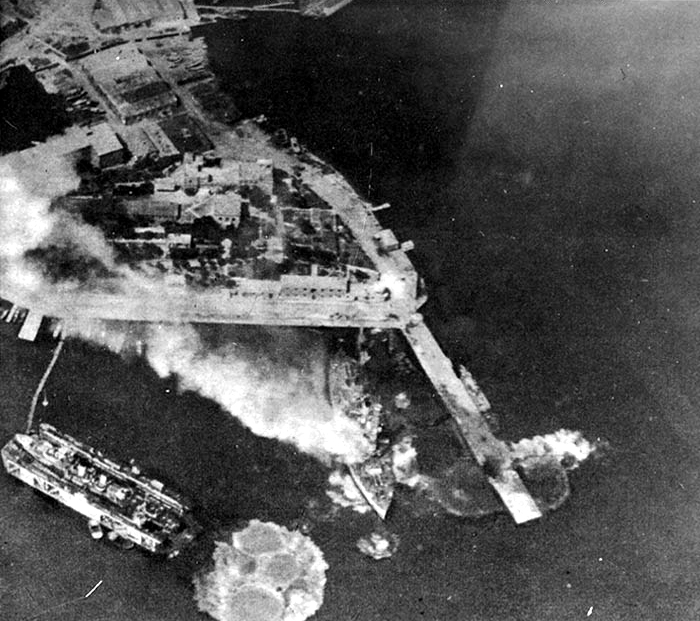
A German photo of the naval base at Salamis during an attack in April 1941 by Junkers Ju 87 Stuka dive bombers. Vasilefs Georgios is in the floating drydock at bottom left.

The Vasilefs Georgios-class ships were ordered on 29 January 1937 as part of a naval rearmament plan that was intended to include one light cruiser and at least four destroyers, one pair of which were to be built in Britain and the other pair in Greece. Vasilefs Georgios was laid down at Yarrow & Company's shipyard in Scotstoun, Scotland, in February 1937, launched on 3 March 1938, and commissioned on 15 February 1939 after she had her armament installed in Greece. Pending the completion of the light cruiser, the ship served as the flagship of the Destroyer Flotilla, under Commander (Antiploiarchos) Pyrros Lappas.

After the Delfino sank the elderly protected cruiser Elli in a sneak attack on 15 August 1940 off the island of Tinos, Vasilefs Georgios and her sister were sent to Tinos to escort the merchant ships there home. During the Greco-Italian War she escorted convoys and participated in raids against Italian lines of communication in the Strait of Otranto on the nights of 14/15 November 1940 and 4/5 January 1941 that failed to locate any ships. The sisters ferried the Greek gold reserves to Crete on 1 March.

After the German invasion of Greece on 6 April, the sisters began to escort convoys between Greece and Egypt via Crete. While anchored in Sofiko Bay in the Saronic Gulf on 12–13 April, Vasilefs Georgios was attacked by German aircraft and badly damaged by near-misses that caused extensive flooding. She managed to reach the Salamis Naval Base despite a severe list where she was drydocked. On 20 April, the floating drydock was scuttled by the Greeks and sank with the unrepaired destroyer still inside it. (Note: Sources disagree about the reason why the drydock sank. Gröner and Koop and Schmolke claim that it was sunk by German Junkers Ju 87 dive bombers, while Rohwer says that it was merely damaged.)

=== In German service ===
The Germans nonetheless were able to raise and repair her, and commissioned her into the Kriegsmarine as ZG3 on 21 March 1942, under the command of Commander (Fregattenkapitän), later Captain (Kapitän zur See), Rolf Johannesson. German alterations were not numerous: they reduced her 37 mm guns to a single pair and exchanged her anti-aircraft machineguns for five 2-centimetre (0.8 in) AA guns in single mounts. Two torpedo tubes were possibly removed as well. The ship also received German mine rails, radios and a S-Gerät sonar. Her crew now consisted of 10 officers and 215 sailors.

After working up, ZG3 was declared operational on 30 May, although her first convoy escort mission, scheduled for 1 June, was cancelled. On 24–25 June, she helped to escort a small troop convoy to Souda Bay, Crete, returning to Piraeus, Greece, two days later. On 2–3 July, the ship helped to lay a minefield off the island of Syros. During the rest of the month, ZG3 escorted two convoys between Greece or Crete and North Africa and received a brief overhaul in the middle of the month. The ship escorted the damaged German submarine U-97 back to Salamis on 5 August. Her next convoy to Tobruk, Libya, was interrupted by the British Operation Pedestal to Malta in the middle of the month and she then towed the damaged submarine U-83 to Salamis on 19–20 August. ZG3 was then renamed Hermes two days later. Over the next several months, the ship escorted convoys between Greece, Crete and Tobruk, interrupted by occasional missions to cover a minefield being laid. Later that month her boilers were cleaned and her 37 mm guns were upgraded. Upon her return to duty on 23 October, she resumed escort work, only adding the Dardanelles and various islands in the Aegean and Dodecanese to her destinations. On 16 November Hermes assisted in the sinking of the Greek submarine Triton. Her propulsion machinery was overhauled at Salamis from 20 January 1943 to 19 February and she resumed her convoy escort missions until the end of March. During this time, none of the ships that she escorted were lost.

With Axis forces confined to northern Tunisia by March, the Kriegsmarine ordered Hermes to transfer to Southern Italy on 30 March to protect the supply lines to Tunisia. Now under the command of Fregattenkapitän Curt Rechel, she arrived at Salerno, Italy, on 4 April. The ship laid a minefield south of Sicily with a group of Italian destroyers on 19–20 April. The following day, she detected the British submarine Splendid and drove it to the surface after 45 minutes of depth-charging, rescuing 20 survivors before the submarine sank. Together with two Italian destroyers, Hermes ferried troops and supplies to Tunisia on 25–26 April. Three days later, she made another supply run with two Italian destroyers, but they were attacked by Allied aircraft off Cape Bon. The two accompanying Italian destroyers were sunk and Hermes had her propulsion machinery crippled by near misses. She was towed to La Goulette, the port of Tunis, and scuttled at the harbor entrance as a blockship on 7 May. Several crewmen were killed in the fighting in Tunis the next day, while the others were either captured by the Allies or evacuated to Trapani, Sicily. Rechel had left for Sicily on the 7th, allegedly to report on the loss of his ship. The Allies refloated the wreck to clear the harbor and it was scrapped after the war.

== Bibliography ==
- Freivogel, Zvonimir (2003). "Vasilefs Georgios and Vasilissa Olga: From Sister-Ships to Adversaries". Warship International. XL (4): 351–364. ISSN 0043-0374.
- Friedman, Norman (2009). British Destroyers From Earliest Days to the Second World War. Annapolis, Maryland: Naval Institute Press. ISBN 978-1-59114-081-8.
- Gröner, Erich (1990). German Warships 1815–1945. Vol. 1: Major Surface Warships. Annapolis, Maryland: Naval Institute Press. ISBN 0-87021-790-9.
- Koop, Gerhard & Schmolke, Klaus-Peter (2003). German Destroyers of World War II. Annapolis, Maryland: Naval Institute Press. ISBN 1-59114-307-1.
- Rohwer, Jürgen (2005). Chronology of the War at Sea 1939–1945: The Naval History of World War Two (Third Revised ed.). Annapolis, Maryland: Naval Institute Press. ISBN 1-59114-119-2.
- Whitley, M. J. (1988). Destroyers of World War Two: An International Encyclopedia. Annapolis, Maryland: Naval Institute Press. ISBN 0-87021-326-1.
- Whitley, M. J. (1991). German Destroyers of World War Two. Annapolis, Maryland: Naval Institute Press. ISBN 1-55750-302-8.
