= Pyrros Lappas =

Greek Navy officer (1899-1981)

- Born: 31 December 1899; Athens, Greece
- Died: 17 June 1981; Athens, Greece
- Military career
- Allegiance: Kingdom of Greece (1915–24, 1935–60); Second Hellenic Republic (1924–35)
- Branch: Hellenic Navy
- Service years: 1915–1960
- Rank: Vice Admiral
- Wars: Asia Minor Campaign, World War II, Greek Civil War

Pyrros Lappas (Greek: Πύρρος Λάππας, 1899–1981) was a Greek Navy officer. He served in the Asia Minor Campaign, commanded warships in World War II, and assumed senior leadership positions in the post-war navy, culminating as Chief of the Hellenic Navy General Staff in 1952–1958. He then served for two years as head of the Military Household of King Paul of Greece, as General Secretary of the Hellenic Olympic Committee in 1961–1968, and as a member of the International Olympic Committee (1965–1980).

== Life ==
=== Early career ===
Born in Athens in 1899, Pyrros Lappas entered the Hellenic Navy Academy on 10 October 1915 and graduated on 10 January 1920 as a Line Cadet Ensign, being promoted to full Ensign on 4 May 1920. He took part in the naval operations of the Greco-Turkish War as a crew member of the battleship Limnos, the destroyer Thyella, and the cruiser Averof, being promoted to Sub-Lieutenant on 20 May 1921.

In 1922, he completed studies at the Navy's Artillery School. During the so-called "Navy Strike" of June 1924 he resigned, but was readmitted on 28 August 1924 with full restoration of his seniority. He commanded the torpedo boat Aigli, and was promoted to Lieutenant on 22 April 1925. He completed the Torpedo School in 1927–1928, was promoted to Lt. Commander on 22 October 1932. In 1934–1935 he commanded the torpedo boats Kios and Proussa, served as commander of the Torpedo Boat Squadron (1935–1936), and of the destroyer Spetsai (1935). After completing staff officer studies at the Naval War School in 1937–1938, and being promoted to commander on 22 October 1938, he was captain of the Spetsai again, before being placed as captain of the brand-new destroyer Vasilefs Georgios in 1939. At the same time, he held the post of chief of staff to the Higher Destroyer Commander.

=== World War II ===
He held these positions during the Greco-Italian War, participating as captain of the Vasilefs Georgios in the first and third naval raids against Italian shipping in the Straits of Otranto (November 1940 and January 1941 respectively). During a Luftwaffe attack on the night of 13/14 April, the Vasilefs Georgios was seriously damaged, necessitating repairs in drydock. As a result, the ship was unable to join the rest of the fleet during its exodus to the Middle East, and was captured by the Germans. Lappas also remained in Greece, and was employed in the Navy General Directorate of the collaborationist government's Ministry of National Defence. In December 1941, however, he managed to flee Greece, joining the Greek Armed Forces in the Middle East on 27 February 1942.

Initially he was appointed captain of the repair ship Ifaistos, before being sent to Britain to oversee the delivery to the Greek navy of four Flower-class corvettes. Likewise, in 1943 he was head of the acceptance mission for the LST-1-class tank landing ships in New Orleans. He personally assumed command of the LST Samos (L179). On 10 January 1944 he was promoted to captain (retroactive to 9 November 1943), and took part as commander of a landing ship squadron in the Allied landing operations in Anzio (January 1944), and Southern France (August 1944). For his service as captain of the Samos, on 14 September 1944 he received the Greek War Cross, III class. For his general war service, and especially his actions during the Anzio landings, he received the Medal for Outstanding Acts on 11 December 1945.

=== Post-war career ===
Following the liberation of Greece, he assumed command of the Miaoulis and of the 12th Destroyer Flotilla (1945–1946), the post of Higher Navy Personnel Director (1946–1947), Higher Technical Director (1947), Higher Light Craft Commander and Higher Submarine Commander in tandem (1947–1949). He then became Higher Naval Operations Commander, leading naval operations during the closing phases of the Greek Civil War, being promoted to rear admiral on 13 September 1949. He was then posted as Deputy Chief of the Navy General Staff in 1949, Navy Inspector-General in 1949–1950, and Chief of the Fleet Command in 1950–52. At the same time, he held in tandem the posts of Chief of the Salamis Naval Base (1951–1952) and Navy Inspector-General (1952). From 6 September 1952 he was Chief of the Navy General Staff and head of NATO's COMEDEAST, being promoted to vice admiral on 6 October 1952. He held the position until his retirement on 13 September 1958.

On 13 October 1958, he was recalled to active service as head of King Paul's Military Household, holding the position until 1 November 1960. He was appointed Honorary Chief of the Navy General Staff on 15 February 1963. In addition, Lappas served as chairman of the Greek Sea Union (1958–1980), member (1953–1954 and 1969–1980) as well as general secretary (1961–1968) of the Hellenic Olympic Committee, and member of the International Olympic Committee (1965–1980).

Military offices
Preceded by Vice Admiral Panagiotis Konstas	Chief of the Navy General Staff; 6 September 1952 – 13 September 1958	Succeeded by Vice Admiral Konstantinos Tsatsos
Preceded by	Chief of the Military Household of the King; 1958–1960	Succeeded by Lt. General Konstantinos Dovas
