= Rolf Johannesson =

- Born: 22 July 1900
- Died: 6 December 1989 (aged 89)
- Military career
- Allegiance: Nazi Germany; West Germany
- Branch: Kriegsmarine; German Navy
- Rank: Konteradmiral
- Commands: Z15 Erich Steinbrinck; ZG3 Hermes
- Conflicts: Battle of the Mediterranean
- Awards: Knight's Cross of the Iron Cross

Rolf Johannesson (22 July 1900 – 6 December 1989) was a German admiral during World War II. He was a recipient of the Knight's Cross of the Iron Cross of Nazi Germany. He joined the post-war Bundesmarine in 1957 and retired in 1961 as a Konteradmiral.

== Life ==
Rolf Johannesson was born on July 22, 1900, in Berlin-Lichterfelde. He attended a secondary school and, after graduating from high school in 1918, joined the Imperial Navy as a midshipman. After the end of the First World War, he was transferred to the small Imperial Navy. He studied at the University of Tübingen in the meantime. He returned to the Navy and rose to the Nazi leadership.

=== Nazi Kriegsmarine ===
In the phase of further consolidation of the National Socialist state and the transition to the impending war aims, the Reichsmarine was renamed the Kriegsmarine in 1935, the Abwehr department was restaffed, and its content and structure were aligned with the future priorities of warfare. In the summer of 1937 Johannesson took over the command of the sabotage and counter-espionage unit of the Condor Legion, stationed in Salamanca.

After Germany launched World War II, he served as a corvette captain and commander of the destroyer "Erich Steinbrinck." With the destroyer, he participated in the Battleship Group's advance into the North Sea and the Battle of Jan Mayen in June 1940. He later served as commander of the destroyer "Hermes" and then commander of the 4th Destroyer Flotilla. On January 1, 1945, he was promoted to Rear Admiral, and as such, his final rank was commander of the fortifications on the Elbe and Weser.

Shortly before the end of World War II was Johannesson commander of the Elbe-Weser naval defense sector of Kriegsmarine. Historians were able to document in the 2020s, that Johansson orderd to execute five people on Heligoland. They were accused of mutiny because they wanted to raise the white flag over the offshore island as a sign of surrender. He never spoke about it publicly after the war and did not mention the verdict in his autobiography.

Within the Nazi Navy, Johannson rose steadily: on April 1, 1937, he was promoted to Korvettenkapitän (Corvette Captain), on August 1, 1940, to Fregattenkapitän (Fregatten Commander), on September 1, 1942, to Kapitän zur See (Captain), and finally on January 1, 1945, to Konteradmiral (Rear Admiral).

After the Wehrmacht's surrender, the British forces initially allowed Johannesson's office to continue operating in order to maintain a German military administration for the Wehrmacht units under their jurisdiction. It was not until January 1946 that Johannesson was taken prisoner of war, where he spent time in a British generals' and admirals' camp in Belgium. He was released in November 1946.

=== Cold-war era ===
Johannesson worked than as a consultant in the Foreign Office of the Evangelical Church in Germany.

It wasn't until January 1957 that Johannesson returned to the German Navy, promoted to flotilla admiral, and was appointed Commander of the Naval Forces for the North and Baltic Seas. In June 1957, he led the first maneuvers of the German Navy in the Kattegat, codenamed "Seewolf."

== Achievements and Reappraisal ==
Johannson was long praised for his contributions to the development of the German Federal Navy after 1956. Since the 2000 there is an ongoing discussion in Deutscher Marine and Bundeswehr, how to deal with the Tradition and history of the armed forces.

For years, historians have been concerned about Johannesson's bust at the Mürwik Naval Academy, especially about its location right next to the bust of resistance fighter Alfred Kranzfelder (1908–1944). Until the 2020s, an award was named after him: the "Admiral Johannesson Prize." This award honored young naval officer candidates annually. In 2022, the MOV changed the name to "Best Prize" for the best-trained officer in the military service.

In 2019, the Bundestag's Research Service wrote: "Johannesson actually concealed his responsibility for his confirmation of the death sentences throughout his life." According to Wissenschaftlicher Dienst it was crucial that he "did not only draw the right conclusions from his personal mistakes, but also from his moral and character failures, and implemented them significantly in the daily routine and practice of the Federal Republic of Germany's Navy."

Hans-Peter Bartels, Commissioner for the Armed Forces said in 2017 to the founding fathers of the Bundeswehr:

"But how worthy of tradition is the founding generation of Steinhoffs, Baudissins, and Kielmanseggs today? May a bust of Vice Admiral Rolf Johannesson, Commander of the Fleet during his time in the Bundeswehr, and previously an admiral in the Kriegsmarine, be placed in the auditorium of the Mürwik Naval Academy? I believe that the educational examination of "broken" biographies, of people who served evil but then helped build good, is absolutely necessary! We encounter it more than once in German history. So: set it up and put a plaque next to it with its historical context! And talk about it in class! German soldiers who are learning to fight today must know why. And they have a right to learn in which generations of they stand between continuities and breaks in civilization. Knowing the whole and choosing what is good as one's own means cultivating tradition."

== Awards and decorations ==
- Iron Cross (1914) 2nd Class (19 July 1919)
- Destroyer War Badge (1940)
- Iron Cross (1939) 1st (6 November 1939) & 1st Class (15 December 1939)
- German Cross in Gold on 12 February 1942 as Fregattenkapitän on Z15 "Erich Steinbrinck"
- Knight's Cross of the Iron Cross on 7 December 1942 as Kapitän zur See and commander of destroyer Hermes
- Grand Cross of the Order of Merit of the Federal Republic of Germany (12 June 1961)

Military offices
Preceded by None	Commander of Z15 Erich Steinbrinck; 31 May 1938 – 19 January 1942	Succeeded by Korvettenkapitän Heinrich Freiherr Freytag von Loringhoven
Preceded by None	Commander of ZG3 Hermes; 8 February 1942 – 2 April 1943	Succeeded by Fregattenkapitän Curt Rechel
Preceded by Flottillenadmiral Max-Eckart Wolff	Commander-in-Chief German Fleet (CINCGERFLEET); 1957 – 1961	Succeeded by Konteradmiral Karl Smidt
