= USS LST-34 =

1943 LST-1-class tank landing ship

History

United States
- Name: LST-34
- Builder: Dravo Corporation, Pittsburgh, Pennsylvania
- Laid down: 15 March 1943
- Launched: 15 June 1943
- Sponsored by: Mrs. Verne C. Cobb
- Commissioned: 26 July 1943
- Decommissioned: 1 December 1946
- Stricken: 23 December 1947
- Identification: Hull symbol: LST-34; Code letters: NGBB
- Honors and awards: 6 × battle stars
- Fate: Transferred to Military Government, Ryukyus, 1 December 1946

Ryukyus
- In service: 1 December 1946
- Out of service: January 1949
- Fate: Ran aground in the Far East, January 1949, hulk abandoned

General characteristics
- Type: LST-1-class tank landing ship
- Displacement: 4,080 long tons (4,145 t) full load; 2,160 long tons (2,190 t) landing
- Length: 328 ft (100 m) oa
- Beam: 50 ft (15 m)
- Draft: Full load: 8 ft 2 in (2.49 m) forward; 14 ft 1 in (4.29 m) aft; Landing at 2,160 t: 3 ft 11 in (1.19 m) forward; 9 ft 10 in (3.00 m) aft
- Installed power: 2 × 900 hp (670 kW) Electro-Motive Diesel 12-567A diesel engines; 1,700 shp (1,300 kW)
- Propulsion: 1 × Falk main reduction gears; 2 × Propellers
- Speed: 12 kn (22 km/h; 14 mph)
- Range: 24,000 nmi (44,000 km; 28,000 mi) at 9 kn (17 km/h; 10 mph) while displacing 3,960 long tons (4,024 t)
- Boats & landing craft carried: 2 or 6 x LCVPs
- Capacity: 2,100 tons oceangoing maximum; 350 tons main deckload
- Troops: 16 officers, 147 enlisted men
- Complement: 13 officers, 104 enlisted men
- Armament: Varied, ultimate armament; 2 × twin 40 mm (1.57 in) Bofors guns; 4 × single 40 mm Bofors guns; 12 × 20 mm (0.79 in) Oerlikon cannons

Service record
- Part of: LST Flotilla 16
- Operations: Gilbert Islands operation (20 November–5 December 1943); Marshall Islands operation; Occupation of Kwajalein and Majuro Atolls (31 January–8 February 1944); Occupation of Eniwetok Atoll (19 February–2 March 1944); Marianas operation; Capture and occupation of Saipan (15–24 June 1944); Leyte landings (20 October, 4–29 November 1944); Lingayen Gulf landings (4–18 January 1945); Assault and occupation of Okinawa Gunto (2–18 May 1945)
- Awards: American Campaign Medal; Asiatic–Pacific Campaign Medal; World War II Victory Medal; Navy Occupation Service Medal w/Asia Clasp; Philippine Liberation Medal

USS LST-34 was a United States Navy LST-1-class tank landing ship used exclusively in the Asiatic-Pacific Theater during World War II. Like many of her class, she was not named and is properly referred to by her hull designation.

== Construction ==
LST-34 was laid down on 15 March 1943, at Pittsburgh, Pennsylvania, by the Dravo Corporation; launched on 15 June 1943; sponsored by Mrs. Verne C. Cobb; and commissioned on 26 July 1943.

== Service history ==
During World War II, LST-34 was assigned to the Asiatic-Pacific theater and participated in the following operations: the Gilbert Islands operation in November and December 1943; the Marshall Islands operation during the occupation of Kwajalein and Majuro Atolls in January and February 1944, and the occupation of Eniwetok Atoll in February March 1944; the Marianas operation during the capture and occupation of Saipan in June 1944; the Leyte landingsin October and November 1944; the Lingayen Gulf landings in January 1945; and the assault and occupation of Okinawa Gunto in May 1945.

== Postwar career ==
Following the war, LST-34 performed occupation duty in the Far East from March to November 1946. She returned to the United States and was decommissioned on 15 November 1946, and transferred to Military Government, Ryukyus. Her name was struck from the Navy list on 23 December 1947. She ran aground in the Far East in January 1949, and her hulk was abandoned.

== Awards ==
LST-34 earned six battle stars for her World War II service.

== Bibliography ==
- "LST-34". Dictionary of American Naval Fighting Ships. Naval History and Heritage Command. 30 July 2015. This article incorporates text from this source, which is in the public domain.
- "USS LST-34". NavSource. 4 July 2014.
