= Greek landing ship Samos (L179) =

1943 LST-1-class tank landing ship

History

United States
- Name: LST-33
- Builder: Dravo Corporation, Pittsburgh, Pennsylvania
- Laid down: 23 February 1943
- Launched: 21 June 1943
- Sponsored by: Mrs. Paul J. Walsh
- Stricken: 23 June 1947
- Identification: Hull symbol: LST-33
- Fate: Transferred to the Hellenic Navy, 18 August 1943

Greece
- Name: Samos
- Namesake: Samos
- Acquired: 18 August 1943
- Decommissioned: 25 September 1977
- Identification: Hull symbol: L179
- Fate: Sold to Greece, January 1947; Decommissioned 1977

General characteristics
- Type: LST-1-class tank landing ship
- Displacement: 4,080 long tons (4,145 t) full load; 2,160 long tons (2,190 t) landing
- Length: 328 ft (100 m) oa
- Beam: 50 ft (15 m)
- Draft: Full load: 8 ft 2 in (2.49 m) forward; 14 ft 1 in (4.29 m) aft; Landing at 2,160 t: 3 ft 11 in (1.19 m) forward; 9 ft 10 in (3.00 m) aft
- Installed power: 2 × 900 hp (670 kW) Electro-Motive Diesel 12-567A diesel engines; 1,700 shp (1,300 kW)
- Propulsion: 1 × Falk main reduction gears; 2 × Propellers
- Speed: 12 kn (22 km/h; 14 mph)
- Range: 24,000 nmi (44,000 km; 28,000 mi) at 9 kn (17 km/h; 10 mph) while displacing 3,960 long tons (4,024 t)
- Boats & landing craft carried: 2 or 6 x LCVPs
- Capacity: 2,100 tons oceangoing maximum; 350 tons main deckload
- Troops: 16 officers, 147 enlisted men
- Complement: 13 officers, 104 enlisted men
- Armament: Varied, ultimate armament; 2 × twin 40 mm (1.57 in) Bofors guns; 4 × single 40 mm Bofors guns; 12 × 20 mm (0.79 in) Oerlikon cannons

USS LST-33 was an LST-1-class tank landing ship of the United States Navy built during World War II. She was transferred to the Royal Hellenic Navy on 18 August 1943, before being commissioned into the USN, and was renamed Samos (Σάμος).

== Construction ==
LST-33 was laid down on 23 February 1943, at Pittsburgh, Pennsylvania by the Dravo Corporation; launched on 21 June 1943; sponsored by Mrs. Paul J. Walsh; and transferred to the Royal Hellenic Navy on 18 August 1943, and renamed Samos (L179). Her commander was Captain Pyrros Lappas.

== Service history ==
Samos, ex-LST-33, sailed from Galveston Bar for Key West, Florida, on 28 August 1943, with convoy HK 125, arriving in Key West, 1 September 1943.

On 11 October 1943, Samos left Halifax, Nova Scotia, in convoy SC 144, en route she joined convoy WN 497 that had departed Loch Ewe, on 26 October. She arrived in Methil, Scotland, on 28 October with a load of lumber.

Samos departed Methil, on 3 December 1943, in convoy EN 314 (series 2), arriving in Loch Ewe, on 5 December. She departed Liverpool, England, in convoy OS 61/KMS 35, on 8 December 1943. The convoy split on 19 December, with Samos continuing on in convoy KMS 35G, arriving in Gibraltar, on 21 December.

She sailed out of Taranto, Italy, in convoy HP 1, on 24 October 1944, arriving in Piraeus, Greece, on 27 October 1944.

Her last recorded convoy was from New York City, on 2 March 1945, in convoy NG 493, arriving in Guantánamo Bay, Cuba, on 9 March 1945.

== Post-war service ==
She was sold to the government of Greece in January 1947. She was struck from the Navy list on 23 June 1947. She served in the Greek navy until being decommissioned on 25 September 1977.

== Bibliography ==
- "LST-33". Dictionary of American Naval Fighting Ships. Naval History and Heritage Command. 4 August 2015. This article incorporates text from this source, which is in the public domain.
- "LST-33". NavSource. 13 December 2013.
- "Convoy EN.314 (Series 2)". Arnold Hague Convoy Database.
- "Convoy HK.125". Arnold Hague Convoy Database.
- "Convoy KMS.35G". Arnold Hague Convoy Database.
- "Convoy NG.493". Arnold Hague Convoy Database.
- "Convoy OS.61/ KMS.35". Arnold Hague Convoy Database.
- "Convoy SC.144". Arnold Hague Convoy Database.
- "Convoy WN.497". Arnold Hague Convoy Database.
- "Convoy HP.1". Arnold Hague Convoy Database.
