= INS Eilat =

INS Eilat may refer to:

- USCGC Northland (WPG-49), a cruising class gunboat, built in 1927, commissioned into the Israel Navy in 1948 as INS Eilat, renamed Matzpen in 1955, and scrapped in 1962
- HMS Zealous (R39), a Z-class destroyer, built in 1944, commissioned into the Israel Navy in 1955 as INS Eilat, sunk by Egypt in 1967
- INS Eilat (321), a Sa'ar 2-class missile boat, commissioned in 1969
- INS Eilat (501) first of three Sa'ar 5-class corvettes of the Israel Navy, built in 1993
