= Project Barbara =

German WWII anti-aircraft project

Project Barbara was a project by the Kriegsmarine, which was undertaken during World War II, to improve the anti-aircraft capabilities of its ships.

== History ==
During this project, numerous 20 mm (0.787 in) anti-aircraft guns were to be added to all surface ships, including destroyers. In 1944 a sub-project was set up, to give small ships, including destroyers, 3.7 cm Flak M42 anti-aircraft guns. In mid–1941, the decision was made to upgrade existing 37 mm (1.457 in) guns to either 40 mm (1.575 in) or 50 mm (1.969 in) guns. The decision was made to use the 5.5 cm Flak Gerät 58 anti-aircraft guns, which were in development, and which were to be able to fire 2 kg (4.4 lb) at a rate of either 120 or 150 rounds per minute, and to be capable of single shot fire. It was to be gas operated and able to work on a triaxial or quad-axial mount. This project never reached fruition, and no guns of the type were ever mounted. Later on, the decision was made to replace all 20 mm (0.787 in) with 30 mm (1.181 in) guns, but this too was not completed.
