= Battles of Narvik =

1940 World War II battles

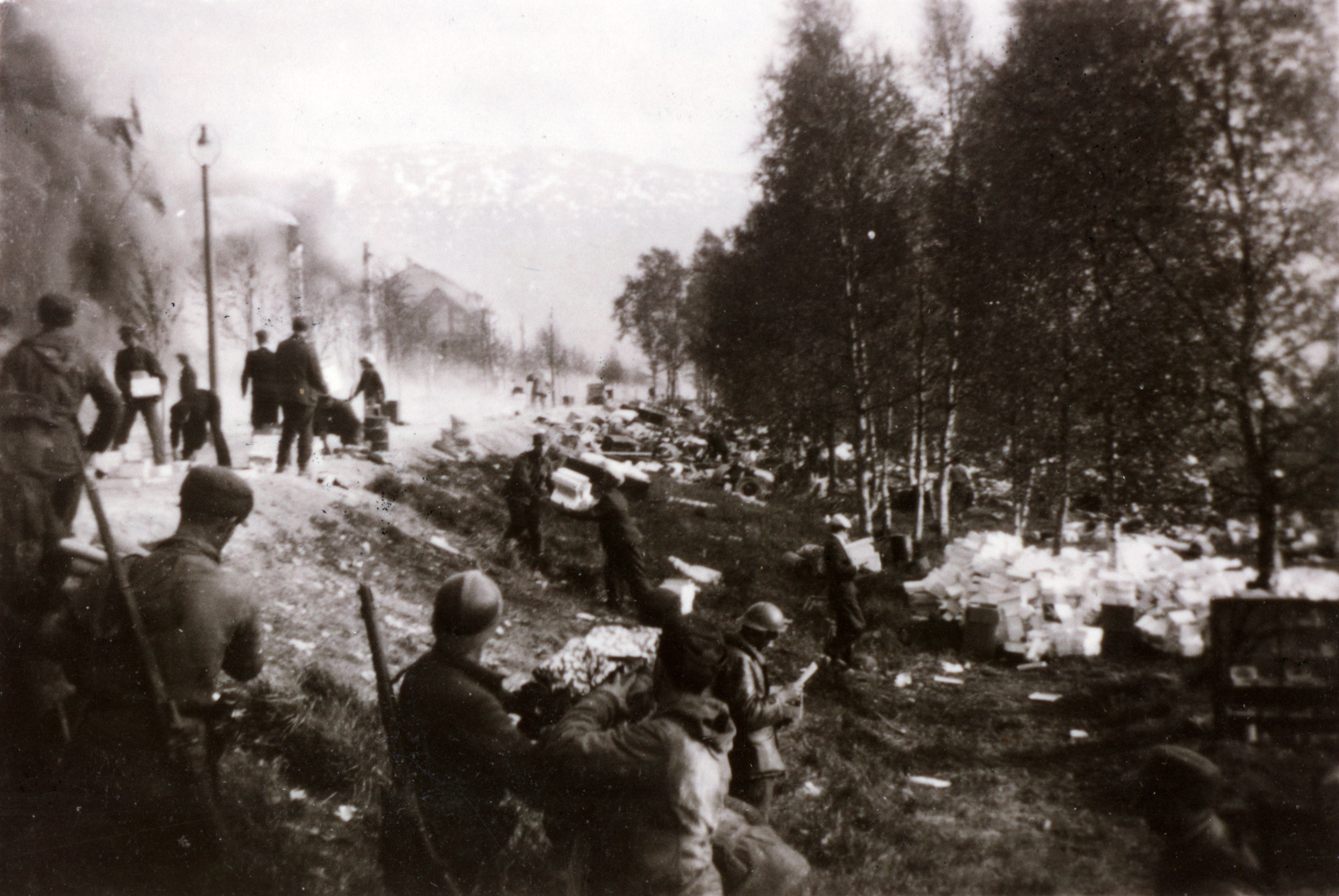
- Allied soldiers during the Battle of Narvik.
Date	9 April 1940 – 8 June 1940
Location	Narvik 68°25′14″N 17°33′36″E
Result	Allied victory

Belligerents
Germany	Norway; United Kingdom; France; Poland

The Battles of Narvik were fought from 9 April to 8 June 1940, as a naval battle in Ofotfjord and as a land battle in the mountains surrounding the north Norwegian town of Narvik, as part of the Norwegian campaign of the Second World War.

The two naval battles in Ofotfjord on 10 April and 13 April were fought between the British Royal Navy together with the Polish Navy (under British supreme command) and the German Kriegsmarine, while the two-month land campaign was fought by Norwegian, French, British, and Polish troops against German mountain troops, shipwrecked Kriegsmarine sailors, and German paratroopers (Fallschirmjäger) from the 7th Air Division. Although defeated at sea off Narvik, losing control of the town of Narvik and being pushed back towards the Swedish border, the Germans eventually prevailed because of the Allied evacuation from Norway in June 1940 following the Battle of France.

Narvik provided an ice-free harbour in the North Atlantic for iron ore transported by rail from Kiruna in Sweden. Both sides in the war had an interest in securing this iron supply for themselves and denying it to the enemy, thereby setting the stage for one of the largest battles since the Invasion of Poland.

Prior to the German invasion, British forces had considered Narvik as a possible landing point for an expedition to help Finland in the Winter War. Such an expedition also had the potential of taking control of the Swedish mines and opening up the Baltic for the Allies.

== German invasion ==
German capture of Narvik
- Part of Operation Weserübung
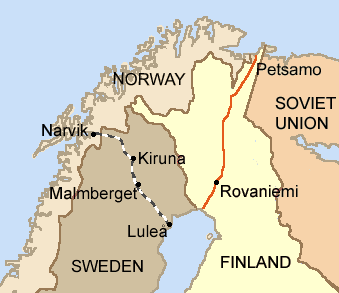
- Iron ore mined at Kiruna and Malmberget was sent by rail to Luleå and Narvik.
Date	9 April 1940
Location	Narvik, Norway
Result	German victory

Belligerents
Norway	(Nazi Germany) Germany

Commanders and leaders
(Norway) Per Askim (Norway) O. Isaachsen Willoch † (Norway) Konrad Sundlo (surrendered)	(Nazi Germany) Friedrich Bonte (Nazi Germany) Eduard Dietl

Strength
2 coastal defence ships	10 destroyers

Casualties and losses
2 coastal defence ships sunk 281 dead	One cargo ship scuttled (no fatalities)

On 1 March 1940, Adolf Hitler ordered the invasion of Norway, codenamed Operation Weserübung as a preventive manoeuvre against a planned, and openly discussed, Franco-British occupation of Norway. This operation would involve most of the Kriegsmarine. Participating units were divided into five groups, which were to occupy six of the main Norwegian ports.

Group I departed Bremerhaven on 6 April. It consisted of 10 German destroyers of the 1934A and 1936 classes Georg Thiele, Wolfgang Zenker, Bernd von Arnim, Erich Giese, Erich Koellner, Diether von Roeder, Hans Lüdemann, Hermann Künne, Wilhelm Heidkamp (flagship) and Anton Schmitt, commanded by Kommodore Friedrich Bonte. Each of the warships carried around 200 soldiers (a total of 1,900 mountain troops (Gebirgsjäger) from the 139th Mountain Regiment (Gebirgsjägerregiment) of the 3rd Mountain Division commanded by General Eduard Dietl). The troop-carrying destroyers were escorted most of the way by the battleships Scharnhorst and Gneisenau.

In the early morning of 9 April, the destroyers of Group I passed the Vestfjorden and arrived at the Ofotfjorden leading to Narvik, in fog and heavy snow. In Ofotfjord, they captured three Norwegian patrol boats (Senja, Michael Sars and Kelt). Before capture Kelt managed to send a message to the coastal defence ship HNoMS Norge, alerting the local Norwegian naval commander of the incoming vessels. The German ships Wolfgang Zenker, Erich Koellner and Hermann Künne landed their soldiers in Herjangsfjord (a northern branch of Ofotfjorden) in order to capture a Norwegian regimental supply base at Elvegårdsmoen. Hans Ludemann and Hermann Künne also landed their troops in order to engage the nearby Norwegian forts (which turned out to be non-existent). Diether von Roeder remained in Ofotfjord in order to ensure German control of the sea. Erich Giese was delayed by engine trouble and did not join the main force for some time.

The main defence of Narvik were the old coastal defence ships Eidsvold and her sister ship Norge. Having been alerted by Kelt, both Norwegian ships prepared for combat: the guns were loaded and life preservers issued to the crew. Around 04:15, the Germans spotted Eidsvold, and Eidsvold immediately signalled the leading German destroyer with an aldis lamp. When the Germans failed to respond to the signal, a warning shot was fired across their bow.

The Germans had orders to occupy Norway peacefully if at all possible, so the German flagship Wilhelm Heidkamp stopped and signalled that it would send an officer to negotiate. A small launch ferried Korvettenkapitän Gerlach over to Eidsvold. Gerlach was taken to the bridge to speak to Captain Odd Isaachsen Willoch.

Gerlach tried to convince Willoch that the Germans had arrived as friends, but that the Norwegians had to hand over their warships to the German armed forces. Captain Willoch asked for time to consult his commander, Captain Per Askim, the commander of Norge. This request was refused by the Germans, but while Willoch had been talking to the German officer, the radio officer on board Eidsvold had communicated the events to Askim. Askim's response to the German demands and order to Willoch came immediately; Willoch and Eidsvold was to open fire. Willoch responded to Askim; "I am attacking." While this was going on, the German destroyer Wilhelm Heidkamp had positioned herself 700 m (770 yd) off the port side of Eidsvold and trained her torpedo launchers on the Norwegian ship.

Gerlach tried once again to convince Willoch to surrender, but Willoch refused. As Gerlach left Eidsvold, he fired a red flare, indicating that the Norwegians intended to fight. At this point, Captain Willoch shouted: "På plass ved kanonene. Nå skal vi slåss, gutter!" ("Man the guns. We're going to fight, boys!"). Eidsvold turned towards the closest destroyer and accelerated, closing the distance to Wilhelm Heidkamp to 300 m (330 yd) while the battery commander ordered the port battery (three 15 cm (5.9 in) guns) to open fire.

The Germans, afraid that Eidsvold might ram the destroyer, fired four torpedoes from Wilhelm Heidkamp at the old ship. Two of the torpedoes hit before the port guns could fire. The Norwegian ammunition magazine was ignited and Eidsvold was blown in two. The forward part of the ship sank in seconds, the stern followed in minutes, propellers still turning. At around 04:37, she was gone. 175 Norwegian sailors died in the freezing water, including Captain Willoch, with just eight surviving.

Deeper inside the fjord, the explosions were heard aboard Norge, but nothing could be seen until two German destroyers suddenly appeared out of the darkness and Captain Per Askim of Norge gave orders to open fire at 04:45. Four rounds were fired from the 21 cm (8.3 in) guns (one from the fore gun and three from the aft) as well as seven or eight rounds from the starboard 15 cm (5.9 in) guns, against the German destroyer Bernd von Arnim, at a range of about 800 m (870 yd). Due to the difficult weather conditions, the guns' optical sights were ineffective: the first salvo fell short of the target and the next ones overshot it.

The German destroyers waited until they were alongside the pier before returning fire. Bernd von Armin opened fire with her 12.7 cm (5 in) guns as well as with machine guns, but the weather gave the Germans problems as well. The destroyer also fired three salvoes of two torpedoes each. The first two salvoes missed, but the last struck Norge midships and she sank in less than one minute. Ninety of the crew were rescued, but 101 perished in the battle which had lasted less than 20 minutes. The destruction of Norge signalled the end of Norwegian resistance in the port.

Much of the Norwegian garrison at Narvik awoke to the sound of gunfire and were unprepared to face the Germans. Many were surrounded and disarmed as they scrambled to occupy defensive positions. The commander-in-chief of the Narvik area, Colonel Konrad Sundlo, is often cited as the reason for the quick capitulation. Described by Kriegsmarine Admiral Erich Raeder as "an officer with reportedly pro-German feelings", he quickly withdrew from the area following the naval engagement and began negotiations with the Germans. After the initial loss of Narvik, Norwegian general Carl Gustav Fleischer sent out a communiqué, part of which read:

Colonel Sundlo initiated immediate negotiations for a cease-fire and withdrew the troops to Framnes. The Germans occupied the city and the Norwegian troops were surrounded between the Germans and the sea. The division commander, who was in East Finnmark, was notified about the situation by telephone and he ordered Colonel Sundlo's second in command, Major Omdal, to arrest Colonel Sundlo

— Carl Gustav Fleischer

Sundlo was charged with treason for the surrender of Narvik after the war, but these charges were dismissed. Instead he was found guilty of negligence for failing to adequately prepare for Narvik's defence, and on charges of cooperating with the Germans during the occupation.

The morning of the German attack four Norwegian steamers were anchored in Narvik; the 4,285 GRT Cate B, the 1,712 GRT Eldrid, the 1,758 GRT Haalegg and the 4,306 GRT Saphir. In addition to the Norwegian vessels, four foreign, neutral ships were present; the 951 GRT Dutch steamer Bernisse, and the three Swedish steamships Boden (4,264 GRT), Oxelösund (5,613 GRT) and Strassa (5,603 GRT). As well as neutral ships, the warring parties had vessels at Narvik, riding anchor in the same port. The British had five steamers in the harbour; the 6,582 GRT Blythmoor, the 5,141 GRT Mersington Court, the 4,304 GRT North Cornwall, the 5,378 GRT Riverton, and the 4,887 GRT Romanby. As the German flotilla seized Narvik, there were 11 German merchant steamers at the port town; the 6,388 GRT Aachen, the 5,398 GRT Altona, the 4,902 GRT Bockenheim, the 5,386 GRT Hein Hoyer, the 4,879 GRT Martha Henrich Fisser, the 8,096 GRT Neuenfels, the 5,806 GRT Odin, the 7,849 GRT Lippe, the 4,339 GRT Frielinghaus, the 5,881 GRT Planet, and the 11,776 GRT replenishment oiler/maintenance ship Jan Wellem. Jan Wellem, a converted former whale factory ship, awaited the arrival of the German warships, which she was tasked to refuel. Working in the harbour were the Swedish tugs Diana (213 GRT) and Styrbjörn (167 GRT). As the German destroyers entered the harbour, the captain of Bockenheim, who assumed that the intruding warships were British, beached and scuttled his vessel. In total, 25 ore ships had been riding at anchor in Narvik at the outset of the fighting, 10 of which were German.

The German destroyers were now short of fuel and had only one fuel tanker in support, the ex-whale factory ship Jan Wellem that had been despatched to Narvik, according to some sources from the secret German naval base Basis Nord at Zapadnaya Litsa in the Soviet Union, where she had been based since 4 February 1940. Another source indicates that she departed Murmansk in the evening of the 6 April and that Basis Nord was never even established. She had arrived off Narvik from the north on 8 April, and had been stopped by the Norwegian patrol boat Kvitøy. Jan Wellem was allowed entry to Narvik by the regional Norwegian naval command, where she was inspected. Her captain claimed that she was carrying 8,500 short tons (7,700 t) of fuel oil and 8,098 crates of food provisions and that she was on her way to Germany. A second tanker, the 6,031 GRT Kattegat which had sailed to Norway from Wilhelmshaven, had been sunk in the Glomfjord in the evening of 9 April. Kattegat had been stopped by the Norwegian fishery protection ship HNoMS Nordkapp, the Norwegian ship first trying to take the tanker as a prize, but due to the large German crew could not control it all the way to Bodø, in the end sinking Kattegat by firing four 47 mm (1.85 in) rounds into the tanker's water line.

Kattegat had been delayed from reaching Narvik in time by the British 8 April mining operations off Norway (Operation Wilfred). A third tanker—Skagerrak—had also been despatched to Norway, in support of the German landings at Trondheim, but she was intercepted by the British cruiser HMS Suffolk, on 14 April, after she had been redirected by German naval command to a waiting position at sea. When the British warship tried to board Skagerrak her crew scuttled her at 68°15′N 02°00′E. Both Kattegat and Skagerrak, which were sister ships, were inspected at Kopervik by the Norwegian torpedo boat HNoMS Stegg, on 5 and 7 April respectively. The captain of Kattegat told the Norwegians that he was headed to Narvik for further orders, and the captain of Skagerrak claimed Murmansk as their destination, and inspections revealed that both tankers had a full load of fuel oil. Skagerrak also carried 165 short tons (150 t) of food provisions, which was claimed as supplies for German merchant ships. The food crates were labelled "Wehrmacht". According to the German plan the destroyers were supposed to have been refuelled by two tankers, Kattegat and Jan Wellem, each receiving some 600 short tons (540 t) of fuel oil.

The flotilla was then to be on its way back to Germany by the evening of 9 April. The plan failed because only Jan Wellem made it to Narvik. Refuelling with just one tanker was difficult; only two destroyers could be refuelled simultaneously, taking seven or eight hours. At arrival in Narvik, the destroyers were almost out of fuel. Making the refuelling more challenging was the fact that Jan Wellem had only improvised refuelling arrangements and inferior pumping equipment. While two destroyers were being refuelled at a time, a third was on guard in fjord, the remaining seven being spread around in the nearby area. By 04:00 on 10 April, Jan Wellem had managed to fully refuel three of the German destroyers, and was in the process of refuelling two more.

In the meantime, British forces had tried to engage the Kriegsmarine, but for the most part, unsuccessfully. On 8 April, the British destroyer HMS Glowworm encountered two German destroyers carrying troops to Trondheim. They summoned their escort the German the heavy cruiser Admiral Hipper. Despite the uneven battle Glowworm tried to torpedo the Hipper but was hit several times. Severely damaged and on fire, Glowworm rammed and damaged Hipper in the battle before exploding.

On the morning of 9 April in poor weather, the British battlecruiser HMS Renown (with its destroyer escort) encountered the German battleships Scharnhorst and Gneisenau , which were screening the destroyers carrying troops. Over the course of the battle Renown damaged the fire control system on Gneisenau and put the aft turret out of action, the two German ships suffered further damage and mechanical problems due to the storm. Renown was hit twice and slightly damaged. Believing the destroyers to be more powerful ships, the German battleships withdrew from the battle heading west at high speed. The destroyers' main mission had been completed, however, as they had succeeded in landing the invasion force.

== First naval Battle of Narvik ==
First naval battle of Narvik
- Part of the Second World War
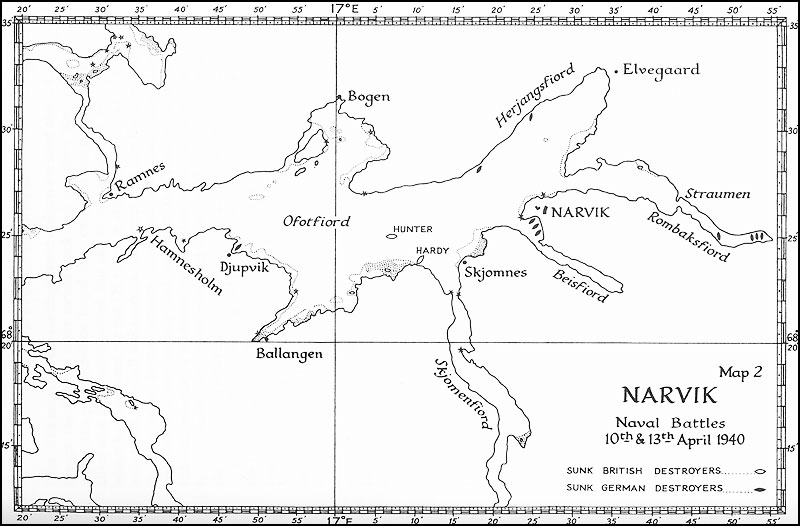
- A map of the Narvik area
Date	10 April 1940
Location	Narvik, Norway
Result	British victory

Belligerents
United Kingdom	(Nazi Germany) Germany

Commanders and leaders
(United Kingdom) B. Warburton-Lee †	(Nazi Germany) Friedrich Bonte †

Strength
5 destroyers	10 destroyers

Casualties and losses
2 destroyers sunk 1 destroyer heavily damaged	2 destroyers sunk 1 ammunition supply ship sunk 6 cargo ships sunk 4 destroyers damaged 163 casualties

The day after the German invasion, the Royal Navy took an opportunity to defeat the Kriegsmarine. The 2nd Destroyer Flotilla—under Commodore Bernard Warburton-Lee and comprising five H-class destroyers (HMS Hardy (flotilla leader), Hotspur, Havock, Hunter and Hostile—moved up the fjord in the early morning. The German destroyers Hermann Künne and Hans Lüdemann were anchored alongside the tanker Jan Wellem and refuelling when the British destroyer attack began at 04:30. The German picket ship (Diether von Roeder) had left its post to refuel, and as the British flotilla approached Narvik, they surprised and engaged a German force at the entrance to the harbour and sank the two destroyers Wilhelm Heidkamp (killing Commodore Bonte) and Anton Schmitt, heavily damaged Diether von Roeder and inflicted lesser damage on two others. They also exchanged fire with German invasion troops ashore but did not have a landing force aboard and therefore turned to leave. Before the destroyers left the scene, Hostile fired her torpedoes at the merchant ships in the harbour. In total, eleven merchant ships (six German, one British, two Swedish and two Norwegian) were sunk during the British sortie into the harbour.

The British flotilla was then engaged by three more German destroyers (Wolfgang Zenker, Erich Koellner and Erich Giese) emerging from the Herjangsfjord, led by Commander Erich Bey and then two more (Georg Thiele and Bernd von Arnim) coming from Ballangen Bay, under Commander Fritz Berger. In the ensuing battle, two British destroyers were lost: the flotilla leader HMS Hardy, which was beached in flames, and HMS Hunter, which was torpedoed and sunk. A third—HMS Hotspur—was also damaged badly by a torpedo. Hotspur and the remaining British destroyers left the battlefield, damaging Georg Thiele as they did so. The German destroyers—now short of fuel and ammunition—did not pursue and the British ships were able to sink the 8,460 GRT ammunition supply ship Rauenfels which they encountered on their way out of the fjord. Soon, the German naval forces were blocked in by British reinforcements, including the cruiser HMS Penelope. During the night of 11–12 April, while manoeuvring in Narvik harbour, Erich Koellner and Wolfgang Zenker ran aground. Wolfgang Zenker damaged her propellers and was restricted to a speed of 20 kn (23 mph; 37 km/h). Erich Koellner was much more badly damaged, so the Germans planned—when she was repaired enough to move—to moor her at Tårstad in the same capacity as Diether von Roeder, as an immobile defence battery.

As the British destroyers left the Vestfjorden outside Narvik, two German submarines—U-25 and U-51—fired torpedoes at them but German torpedoes at the time had severe problems with their magnetic detonator systems—possibly due to the high northern latitude: all of them failed and either did not detonate at all or detonated well before reaching their targets.

Both the German naval commander—Kommodore Friedrich Bonte (on Wilhelm Heidkamp)—and the British commander—Captain Bernard Warburton-Lee (on Hardy)—were killed in the battle. Warburton-Lee was posthumously awarded the Victoria Cross, Bonte the Knight's Cross of the Iron Cross.

== Second naval Battle of Narvik ==
Second naval battle of Narvik
- Part of the Second World War
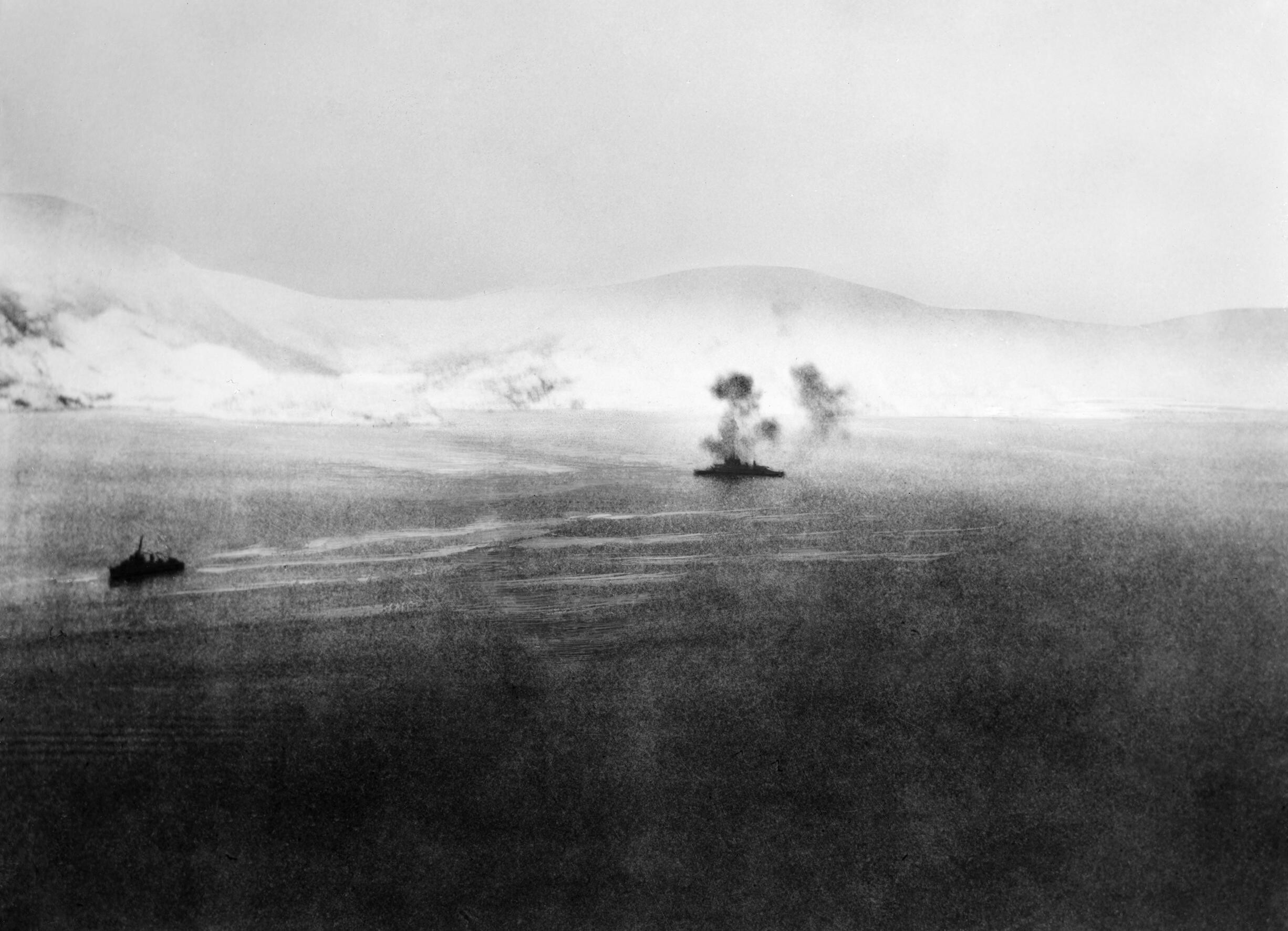
- Warspite engaging shore batteries during the Second Battle of Narvik.
Date	13 April 1940
Location	Narvik, Norway
Result	British victory

Belligerents
United Kingdom	(Nazi Germany) Germany

Commanders and leaders
(United Kingdom) William Whitworth	(Nazi Germany) Erich Bey

Strength
1 battleship 9 destroyers 1 aircraft carrier a small number of aircraft	8 destroyers 2 U-boats

Casualties and losses
3 destroyers damaged 2 aircraft shot down 28 killed 55 wounded	8 destroyers sunk or scuttled 1 U-boat sunk 128 killed 67 wounded

The Royal Navy considered it imperative, for morale and strategic purposes, to defeat the Germans in Narvik, so Vice Admiral William Whitworth was sent with the battleship HMS Warspite and nine destroyers; four Tribal-class (HMS Bedouin, Cossack, Punjabi, and Eskimo) and five others (HMS Kimberley, Hero, Icarus, Forester and Foxhound), accompanied by aircraft from the aircraft carrier HMS Furious. These forces arrived in the Ofotfjord on 13 April to find that the eight remaining German destroyers—now under the command of Fregattenkapitän Erich Bey—were virtually stranded due to lack of fuel and were short of ammunition.

Before the battle, Warspite launched her catapult plane (a float-equipped Fairey Swordfish, L 9767), with the crew ordered to search for German ships and to bomb any targets of opportunity. After spotting and reporting several of the German destroyers, the crew spotted the U-boat U-64, anchored just 50 yards off-shore in the Herjangsfjord near Bjerkvik. The Swordfish attacked and dropped two 100 lb anti-submarine bombs: one was a near-miss, but one hit and sank the submarine. Most of the crew survived and were rescued by German mountain troops. This was the first U-boat sunk by an aircraft during the war and the only instance of an aircraft launched from a battleship sinking a U-boat.

In the ensuing battle, three of the German destroyers were sunk by Warspite and her escorts and the other five were scuttled by their crews when they ran out of fuel and ammunition. The first lost was Erich Koellner, which tried to ambush the Allied forces but was spotted by Warspite's Swordfish and subsequently torpedoed and shelled by the destroyers and battleship. The destroyer's commander, Alfred Schulze-Hinrichs, and the surviving members of his crew, were captured by Norwegian forces. Then Wolfgang Zenker, Bernd von Arnim, Hans Ludemann and Hermann Künne engaged the British forces but only managed to lightly damage HMS Bedouin and Wolfgang Zenker tried to torpedo Warspite. The British launched a force of ten Swordfish from Furious to attack the German destroyers with 250 lb bombs. They scored no hits and two aircraft were shot-down; the crew of one were lost, the crew of the other were picked up by Punjabi after making a forced-landing on the shore.

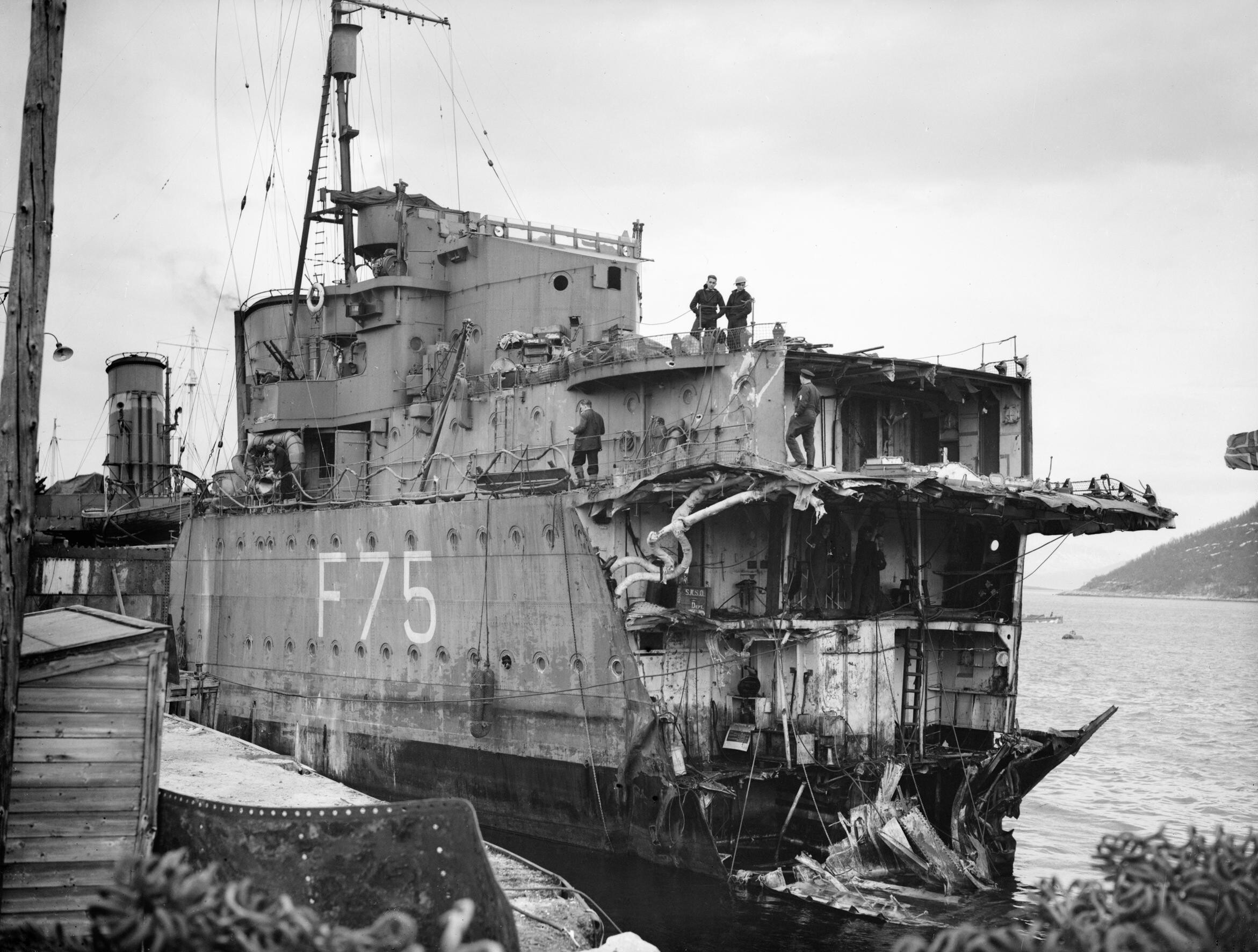
HMS Eskimo after losing her bow.

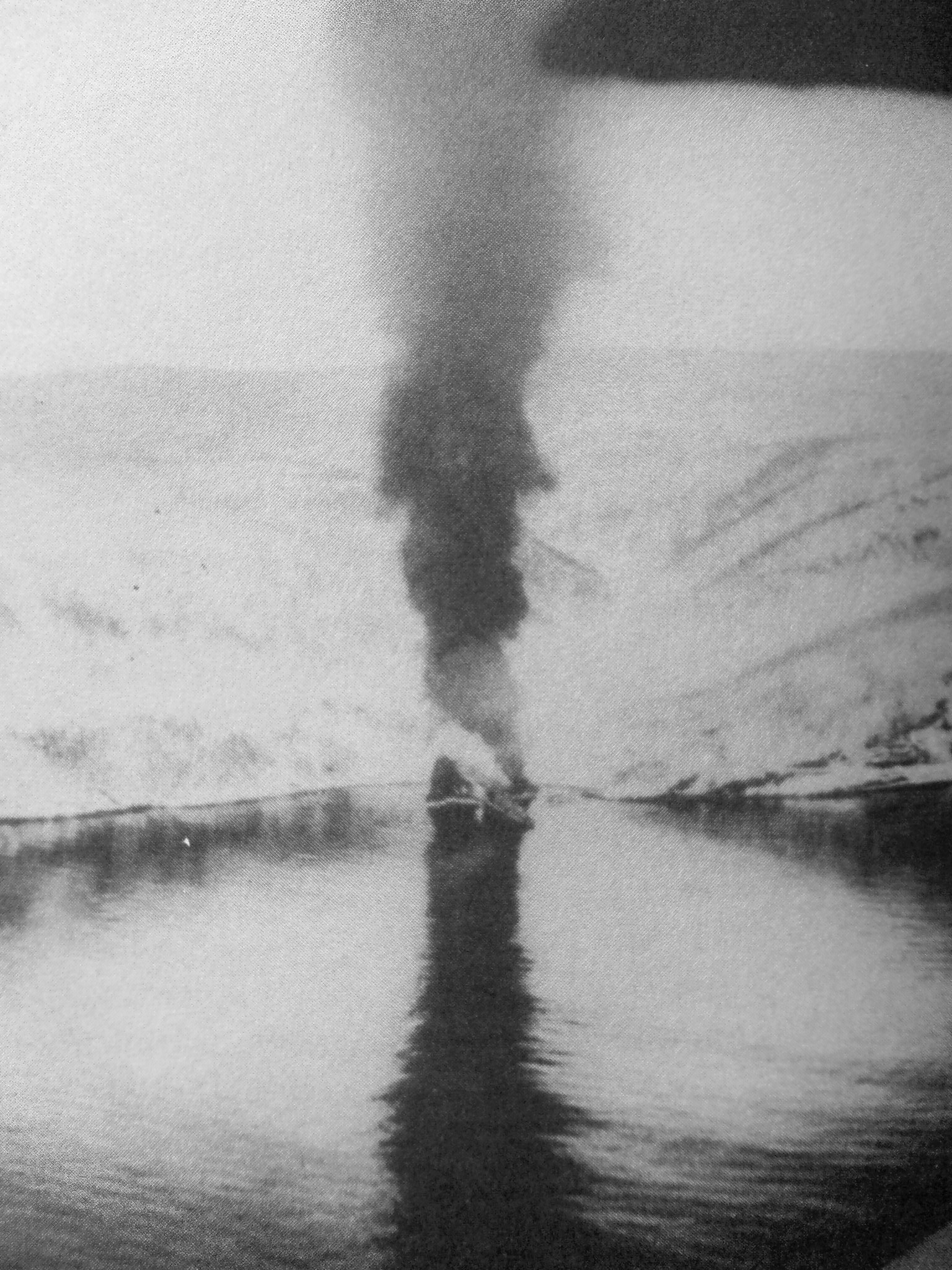
Hermann Künne on fire.

Finally, when the German destroyers were low on ammunition, they retreated, except for Hermann Künne, which had not received the order. Hermann Künne was fired upon by the pursuing HMS Eskimo, but she took no hits. Out of ammunition but undamaged, Hermann Künne was scuttled by her crew in Trollvika in the Herjangsfjord. After scuttling the ship, the crew placed demolition depth charges on the ship, attempting to sink her in Trollvika's shallow waters. Eskimo, still in hot pursuit, launched a torpedo which hit Hermann Künne, setting her on fire. Whether the German ship's own depth charges or the torpedo from Eskimo was the source of the explosion is unclear. Eskimo was in turn ambushed by Georg Thiele and Hans Ludemann, losing her bow but surviving. Diether von Roeder and Erich Giese, both suffering engine problems, fired upon the British forces while still docked, damaging Punjabi and Cossack but they were both sunk before they could cause further damage. That was the last German counter-attack.

Shore batteries and installations were also very badly damaged by Warspite's guns. On the Allied side, the damage to HMS Eskimo kept her in Norway until 31 May 1940. German submarines again suffered torpedo failures, when U-46 and U-48 fired at the departing Warspite on 14 April. The remaining German destroyers (Wolfgang Zenker, Georg Thiele, Bernd von Arnim and Hans Lüdemann) retreated into Rombaksfjord and were scuttled soon after. The only German ship which survived within the port area was the submarine U-51.

The Germans lost over 1,000 men, a U-boat, and eight destroyers. With the losses from the previous battle this constituted 50% of the Kriegsmarine's destroyer strength. The shipwrecked crew of Erich Giese and several other German destroyers reported that they were fired on during the engagement.

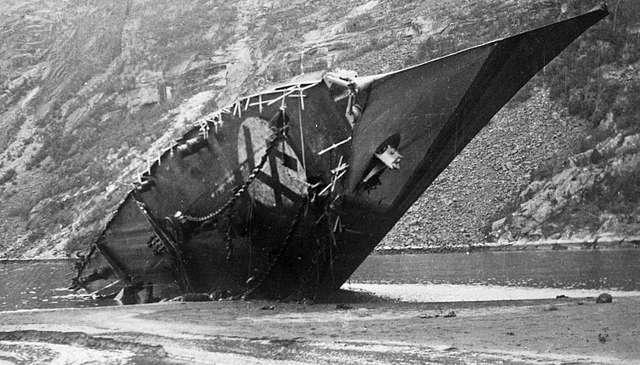
The wreck of the scuttled Bernd von Arnim in the Rombaksfjord.

About 2,600 German survivors from the battle were organised into an improvised marine unit, the Gebirgsmarine, and fought with the 139th Gebirgsjäger Regiment in the subsequent land battle. Although unsuited for combat in the mountainous terrain around Narvik, the shipwrecked sailors manned the two 10.5 cm (4.1 in) FlaK guns and the 11 light anti-aircraft guns salvaged from the ships sunk during the naval battles and conducted defensive operations. The sailors were armed from the stocks captured at the Norwegian army base Elvegårdsmoen, more than 8,000 Krag-Jørgensen rifles and 315 machine guns intended for the mobilisation of Norwegian army units in the Narvik area.

== Later naval operations ==
After the naval battles of Narvik, the port and its surroundings remained in German hands, as no Allied forces were available to be landed there. Naval operations were limited at this stage to shore bombardment, as Narvik was not a primary Allied objective.

Among others, the Polish destroyers Grom, Burza and Błyskawica took part in these operations, during which Grom was sunk by German aircraft on 4 May 1940, with the loss of 59 sailors.

== Land battle ==
Battle of Narvik
- Part of the Second World War
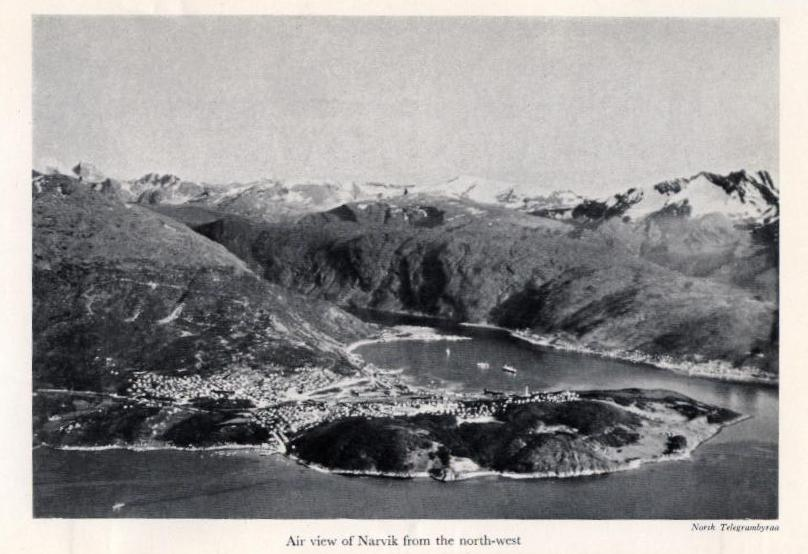
- Narvik during the Second World War
Date	9 April–8 June 1940 (1 month, 4 weeks and 2 days)
Location	Nordland and Troms, Norway
Result	Allied victory and subsequent withdrawal

Belligerents
Norway; France; United Kingdom; Poland	(Nazi Germany) Germany

Commanders and leaders
Carl Gustav Fleischer (French Third Republic) R. Magrin-Vernerey; William Boyle; Z. Bohusz-Szyszko	(Nazi Germany) Eduard Dietl

Strength
(Norway) Norwegian 6th Division (French Third Republic) Three battalions of Chasseurs Alpins; Two battalions of 13th Demi-Brigade of the Foreign Legion; 342e CACC (15 Hotchkiss H35 tanks) (United Kingdom) Four British battalions Four battalions of the Polish Independent Highland Brigade; Total: 24,500 men	(Nazi Germany) 2,000 Gebirgsjäger (mostly from Austria); 2,600 sailors 1,000 Fallschirmjägers Total: 5,600 men

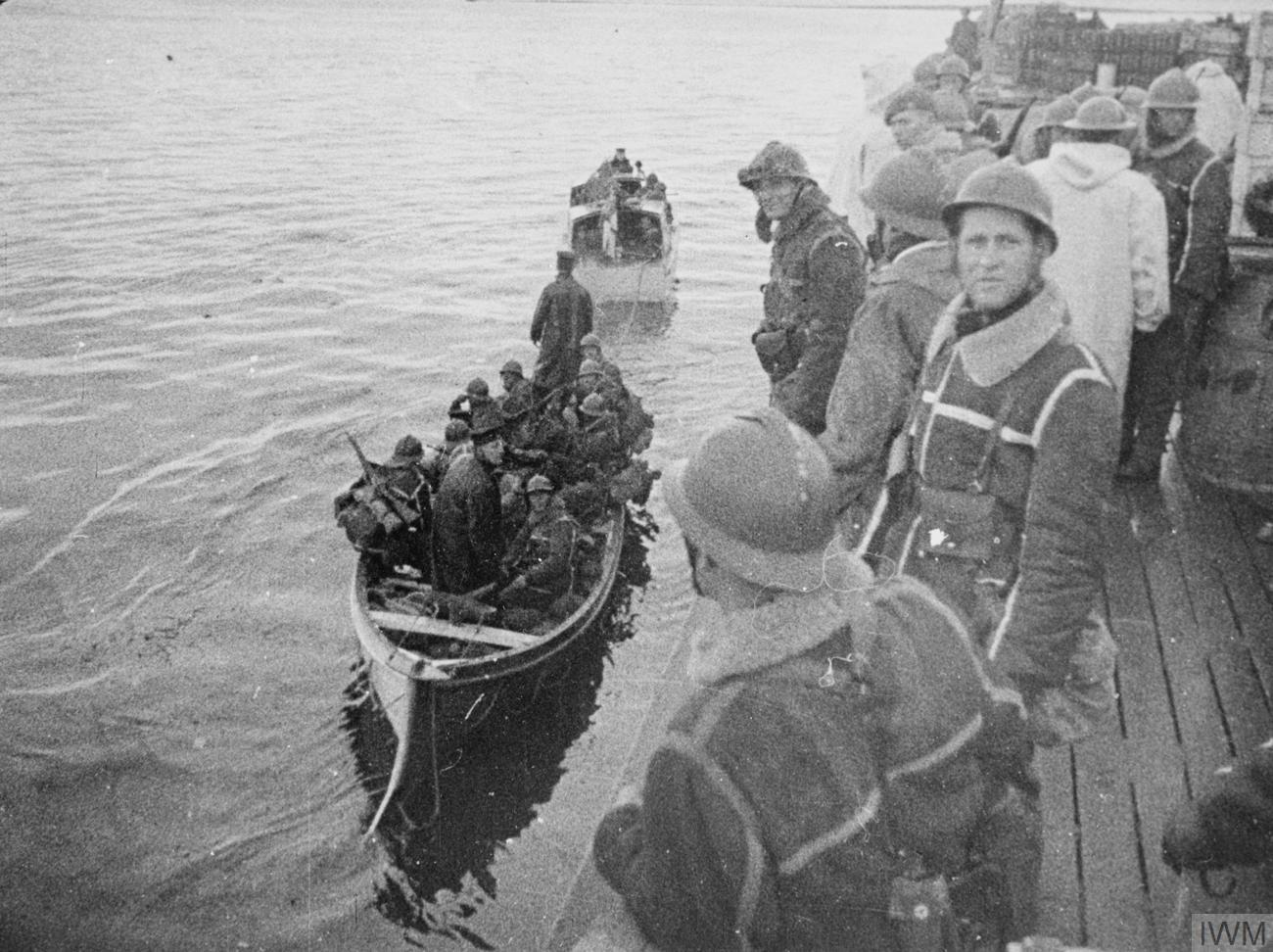
French Légionnaires landing at Bjerkvik after fierce bombardment by British ships, 13 May. French troops massed in boats under machine gun fire from the rocks and shore.

During the Norwegian Campaign, Narvik and its surrounding area saw significant fighting, initially from 9 April between German and Norwegian forces, subsequently between Allied and German forces, conducted by the Norwegian 6th Division of the Norwegian Army as well as by an Allied expeditionary corps until 9 June 1940. Unlike the campaign in southern Norway, the Allied troops in Narvik would eventually outnumber the Norwegian troops. Five nations participated in the fighting. From 5–10 May, the fighting in the Narvik area was the only active theatre of land war in the Second World War.

At the outset, the position of the German commander—Dietl—was not good: his 2,000 troops were outnumbered. After the German destroyers had been sunk, however, about 2,600 German sailors joined in the land battle. Another 290 German specialists travelled via Sweden posing as health care workers. During the last three to four weeks, the Germans were also reinforced by about 1,000 men air dropped over Bjørnfjell, thus bringing the total number of Germans to around 5,600. Their position and outlook changed from good to dire several times. On occasions, the entire operation was controlled directly from the German High Command in Berlin; Hitler's mood was reportedly swinging heavily and he repeatedly contemplated withdrawal. Intelligence agents captured later in the war also stated that Dietl himself had been considering crossing the Swedish frontier with his troops to be interned, until the German agent Marina Lee infiltrated Auchinleck's headquarters at Tromsø and obtained the British battle plan; however, the accuracy of this allegation has been questioned. The Norwegian force—under General Carl Gustav Fleischer—eventually reached 8,000–10,000 men after a few weeks. The total number of Allied troops in the campaign—in and around Narvik—reached 24,500 men.

The early phase of the invasion was marked by the German advantage of surprise. Norwegian troops in northern Norway had been called out on a three-month neutrality watch during the winter of 1939/1940, and so they had trained together. From 9–25 April, the Norwegian forces suffered three catastrophes. First, the forces protecting Narvik were unable to resist the Germans due to the commanding officer—the later NS Hird commander Colonel Konrad Sundlo—refusing to fight the invaders; second, around 200 soldiers from the Narvik garrison who had escaped capture and were blocking the railway to Sweden were caught by surprise while resting at Bjørnfjell, most of the men being captured; third, I/IR12 (1st battalion of Infantry Regiment 12) sent to hold Gratangsbotn was attacked by surprise while in camp, suffering casualties that ruined its spirit and effectively knocked it out of the remainder of the campaign.

From Denmark, a battalion-sized detachment of the Luftwaffe's Regiment General Göring, commanded by Hauptmann Kluge was sent by sea to Oslo, in April, being engaged alongside the Army first in the advance to Trondheim, then north up into the Arctic Circle to take the port of Bodø and relieve the pressure on the beleaguered élite Gebirgsjäger further north at Narvik.

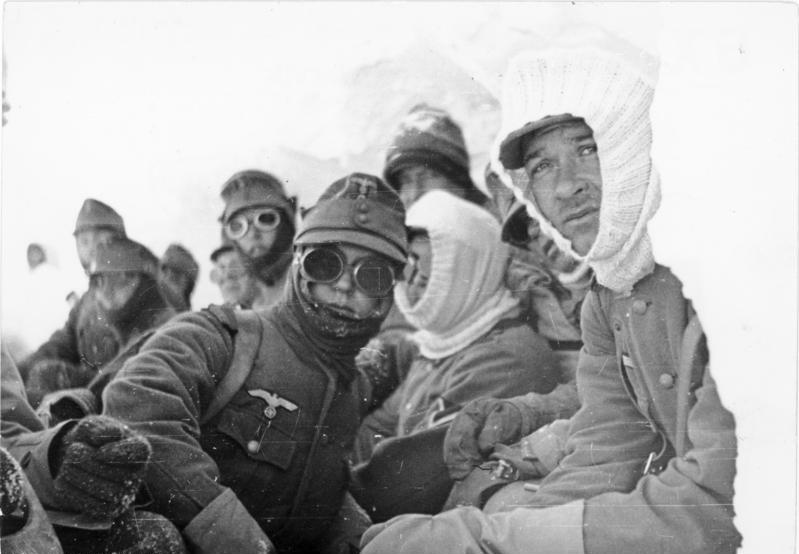
German Gebirgsjägers in the mountains at Narvik.

Due to mounting Norwegian pressure and difficulties with bringing up supplies to the forward lying troops, the Germans abandoned Gratangsbotn and withdrew from the hill Lapphaugen and the valley Gratangsdalen, following the Battle of Gratangen. In the beginning of May, the Norwegians started an advance southwards towards Narvik. Once it became clear that the Allies would mount the main invasion of Narvik itself in mid-May, the Norwegian direction altered towards Bjørnfjell. The British arrived first and set up headquarters in Harstad on 14 April. In the following days, three battalions were deployed mainly at Sjøvegan in Skånland Municipality (where a naval base was established) and at Bogen. Later, they were deployed south of the Ofotfjord, at Ballangen and Håkvik.

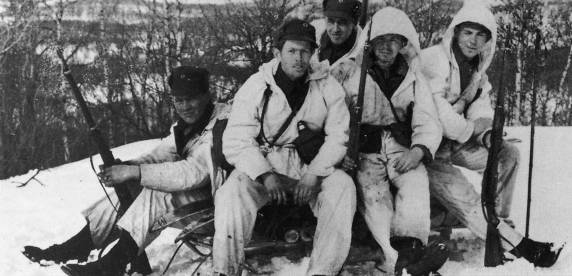
Group of Norwegian soldiers on the Narvik front.

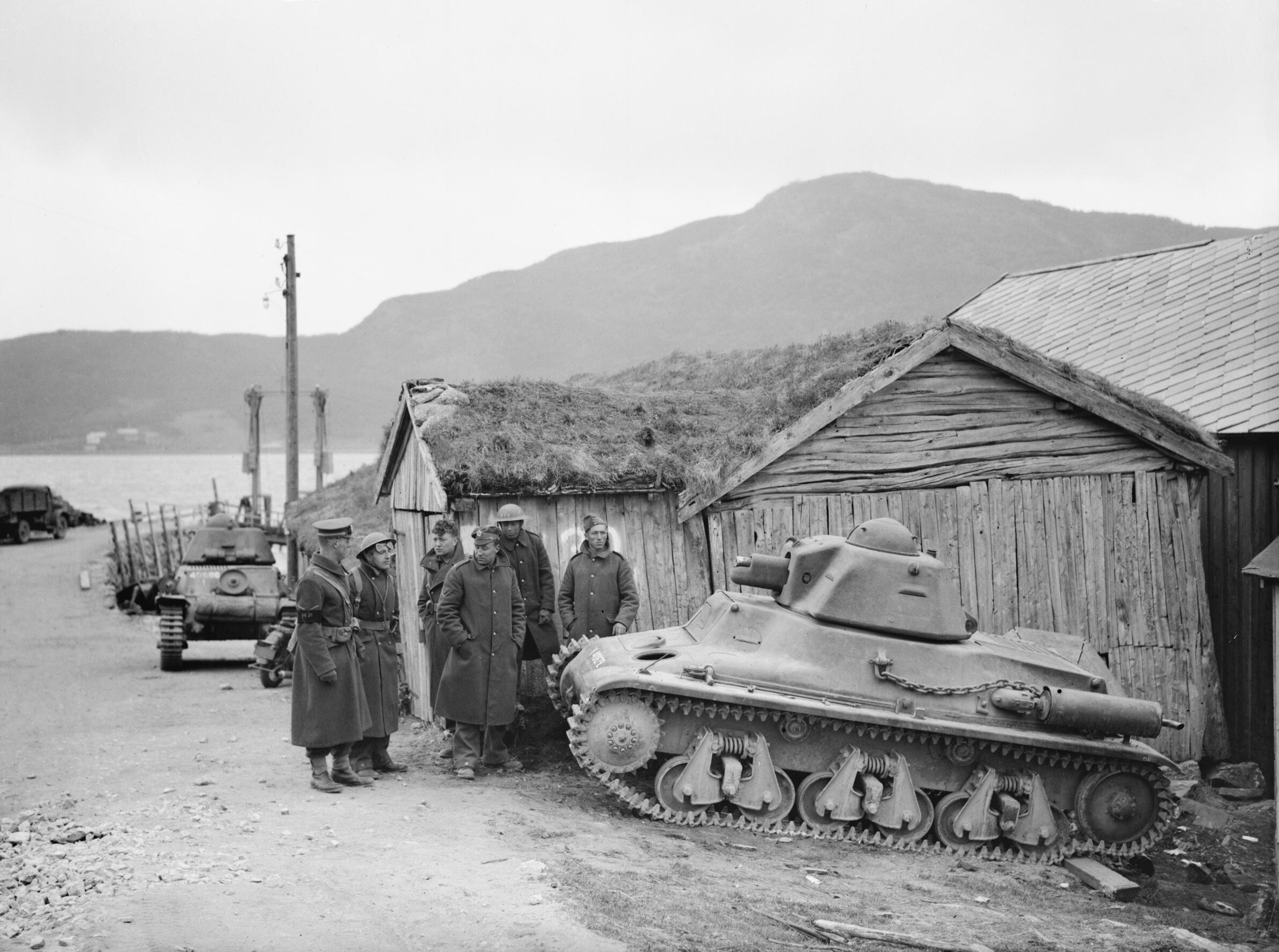
British, Polish and French troops beside one of the 5 Hotchkiss H39 tanks of the 342e CACC in Steinsland.

The initial British detachment was reinforced on 28 April by a French expeditionary force (Corps expéditionnaire français en Scandinavie, CEFS), led by General Antoine Béthouart and composed of mountain troops. Three battalions of Alpine troops and two battalions of 13th Demi-Brigade of the Foreign Legion were deployed both north and south of the Ofotfjord, but later, the north would be the main French area of operation. Four Polish battalions arrived on 9 May. They were first deployed north of the Ofotfjord, but later redeployed to the area south of the fjord. In early June they were formed into the Polish Podhale Independent Highland Brigade under General Zygmunt Bohusz-Szyszko and part of CEFS.

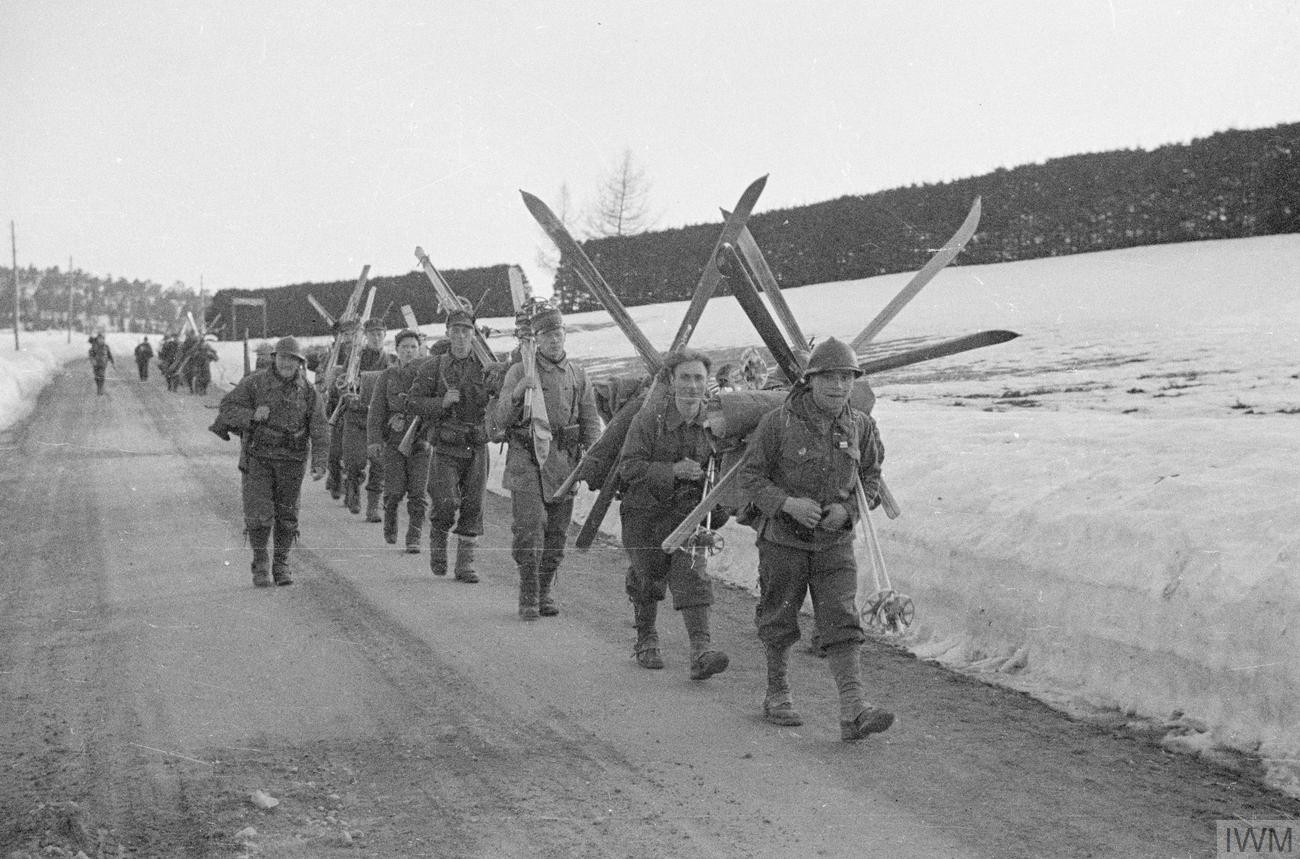
French Chasseurs Alpins carry their skis on the march in Norway, May 1940.

In addition, the Allies had difficulty in deciding how best to retake Narvik and the iron ore railway. There was no unified command for the troops facing the Germans at Narvik: the Norwegians and the Allies retained separate commanders and cooperation between them was not always smooth. Even within the British forces, the Army and Navy commanders—Major-General Pierse J. Mackesy and Admiral of the Fleet William Boyle, Lord Cork—had difficulty cooperating: Cork advocated a swift and direct attack from the sea while Mackesy advocated a cautious approach from both sides of the Ofotfjord. Consequent to this, on 21 April, Lord Cork was given supreme command of all Allied forces.

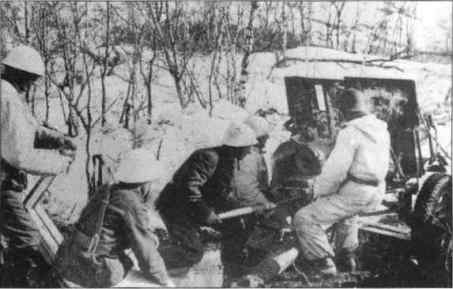
A Norwegian M/01 7.5 cm (2.95 in) field gun in action north of Narvik.

In the second week of May, the Norwegian advances against the Germans east of Gratangseidet were the most significant movements on the Narvik front. In addition, on the Norwegians' right flank French alpine troops advanced up the Laberg valley, supported by a company of Norwegian ski troops. In the south, the Allies did not have much success, and in the north of the Ofotfjord, they were not making any progress. The Norwegians continued their successful mountain campaign, and in mid-May the Allies took the initiative and achieved significant victories. Both Paris and London had been growing impatient with the slow progress in Narvik, and the French commander—Béthouart—had pressed for more action.

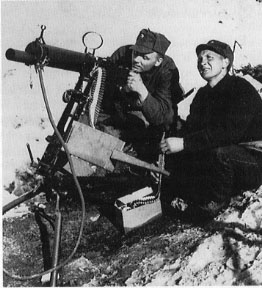
Norwegian M/29 heavy machine gun at the Narvik front.

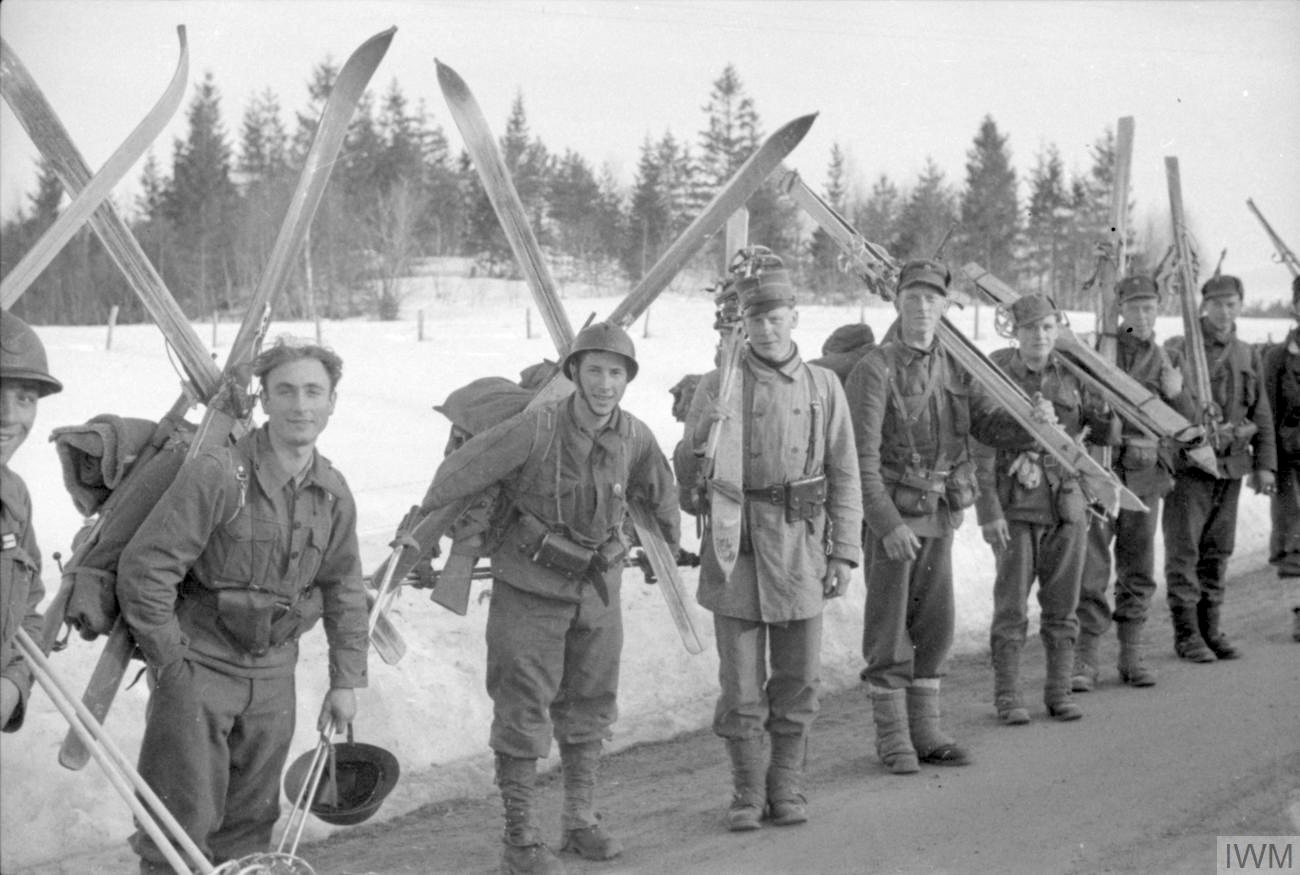
French and Norwegian ski troops.

The cautious approach on land was abandoned and an amphibious attack was launched at around midnight on 12 May. This was directed at Bjerkvik and was preceded by a naval bombardment from British warships in Herjangsfjord. Then landing craft put ashore French Foreign Legionnaires, supported by five French Hotchkiss H39 light tanks of the 342e CACC (Compagnie Autonome de Chars de Combat/ Independent Tank Company), which successfully attacked Bjerkvik, the Elvegårdsmoen army camp and advanced northeast to where the Germans were withdrawing and south along the east side of Herjangsfjord. The plan also required Polish troops to advance toward Bjerkvik from land on the west side of the fjord, but heavy terrain delayed them and they did not arrive before Bjerkvik was taken. It had also been part of the plan for French and Norwegian troops to advance from the north in order to box the Germans in, but cooperation problems between the Norwegian and French commanders left a gap through which the Germans escaped. Despite this, the Allies had a clear path north of Narvik and planned to attack over Rombaksfjord.

It had been anticipated in London that as the buildup of troops in Narvik slowly continued, a corps headquarters would be needed to exercise effective control. On 11 May, Lieutenant-General Claude Auchinleck arrived in Narvik, and on 13 May assumed leadership of the Allied land and air forces (under Lord Cork's overall command), which at this time was designated the North-Western Expeditionary Force. It was clear to the Allies that once Narvik was captured, its long-term retention would depend on permanently holding the town of Bodø to the south in Nordland which was on the route of the German advance from Trondheim. Consequently, Auchinleck redeployed all British troops to concentrate on this southern enterprise, and appointed French Brigadier-General Béthouart—an expert in both mountain and winter warfare—to command the French and Polish troops, which would be responsible for operations in the Narvik area in conjunction with Norwegian forces.

Again, the attack was stalled while the Allies waited for air support to be fully established from Bardufoss. At 23:40 on 27 May, a naval bombardment commenced from the north. Two French and one Norwegian battalions would be transported across the Rombaksfjord and advance on Narvik from the north. In the south, the Polish battalions would advance toward Ankenes and inner Beisfjord. The maximum capacity of the landing barges was 290 men, and these troops could not be reinforced for 45 minutes. These first troops were able to get a foothold on Ornes by the time the rest of the French and the Norwegians were landed. The French moved west toward the city and east along the railway. The Norwegians moved toward Taraldsvik mountain, circled around and moved down toward the city. The German commander decided to evacuate before 07:00 and retired along the Beisfjord. This was the first major Allied victory on land.

== Operation Alphabet ==
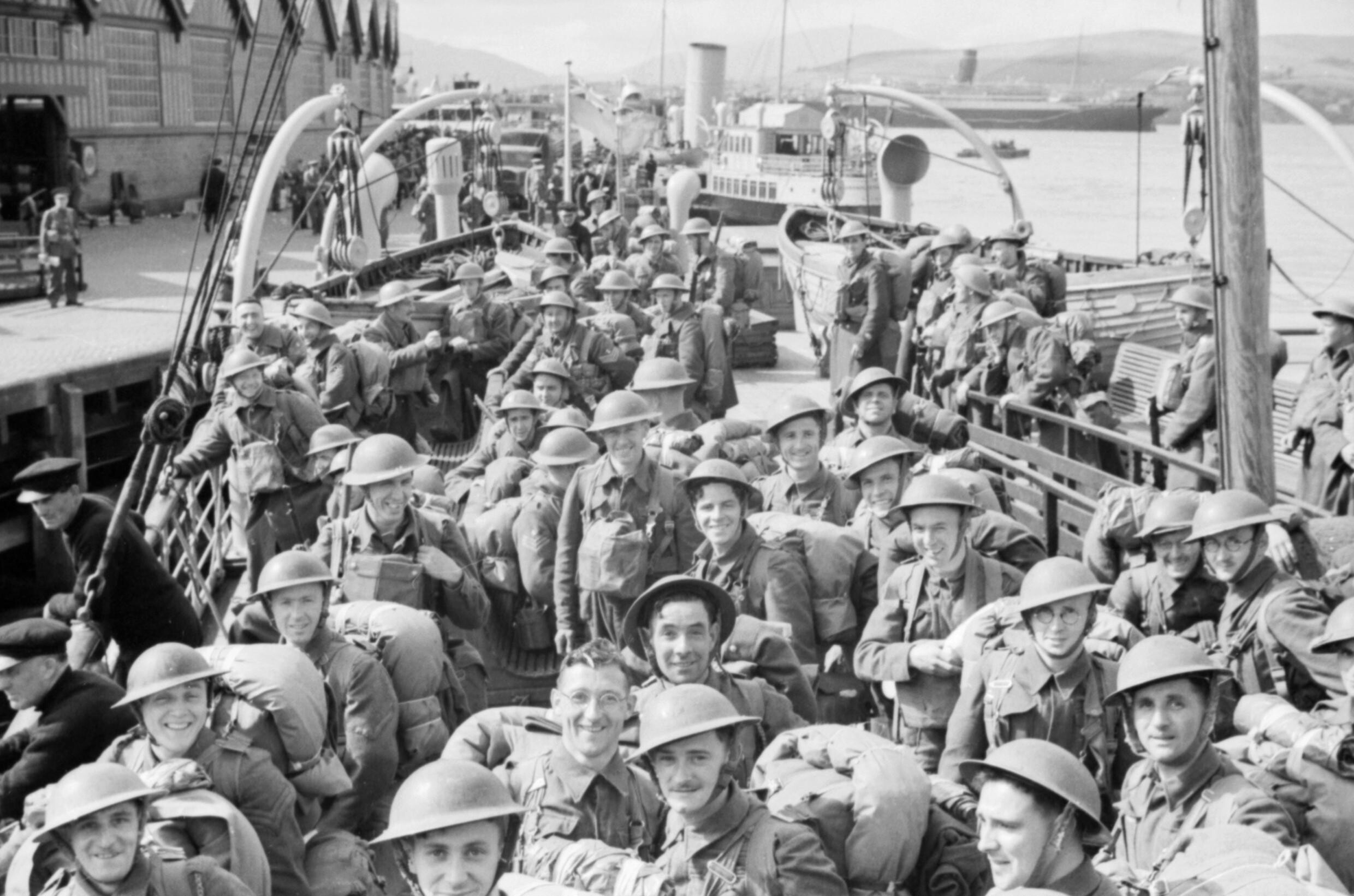
British troops returning to the United Kingdom at Greenock in June 1940

It seemed now that it was only a matter of time before the Germans would have to surrender. They were pushed from the north by the Norwegians, from the west by the French and from the southwest by the Poles. It appeared that Bjørnfjell would be the Germans' last stand, but events elsewhere in Europe came to their rescue. London had already secretly decided to evacuate on 24 May and that became apparent in the following days. On the night of 24/25 May, Lord Cork received orders to retreat, but under cover so the Germans would be prevented from interfering. The Allied commanders agreed that an attack on Narvik would disguise the retreat and allow the destruction of the iron ore harbour.

The Norwegian government and commanders were first told in early June and the news was met with disbelief and bitterness. The Norwegians still hoped to defeat the Germans alone and, as late as 5 June, one of the two Norwegian brigades was ordered to attack. The Norwegian government also explored the possibility of creating a neutral, but free Northern Norway. This plan proved futile, and on 7 June the King and government were evacuated to Britain. All Allied troops were evacuated from Narvik between 4 and 8 June.

Three Polish passenger ships, MS Sobieski, Batory and Chrobry, took part in the evacuation operation. Chrobry was sunk on 14–15 May by German bombers. On 8 June, General Dietl retook Narvik, and on 10 June the last Norwegian forces in Norway surrendered.

== Operation Juno ==
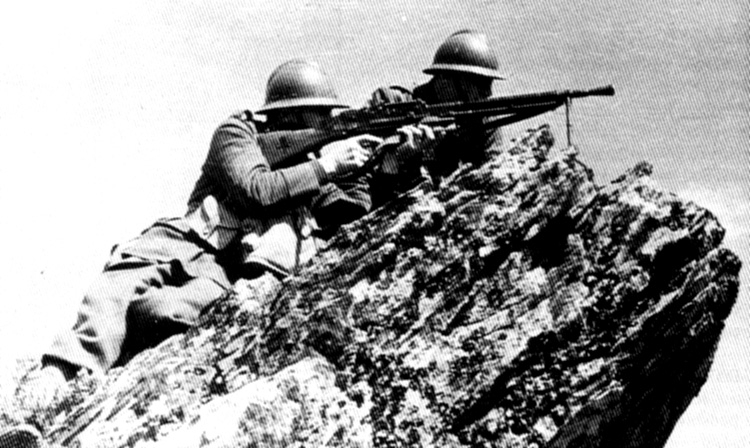
Members of the Polish Independent Highland Brigade at Narvik.

On 7 June, the British aircraft carrier HMS Glorious had taken on board 10 Gloster Gladiators and eight Hawker Hurricanes from 46 Squadron and 263 Squadron Royal Air Force (RAF). These were flown off from land bases to keep them from being destroyed in the evacuation. Glorious left a larger convoy to proceed independently. The next day, while sailing through the Norwegian Sea to return to Scapa Flow, the carrier and her escorts—the destroyers HMS Acasta and Ardent—were intercepted by the German battlecruisers Scharnhorst and Gneisenau. The carrier and her escorts were sunk with the loss of more than 1,500 men. Scharnhorst was badly damaged by a torpedo from Acasta and both German vessels were hit by a number of medium shells. The damage to the German ships was sufficient to cause the Germans to retire to Trondheim, which allowed the safe passage of the evacuation convoy through the area later that day.

== Aftermath ==
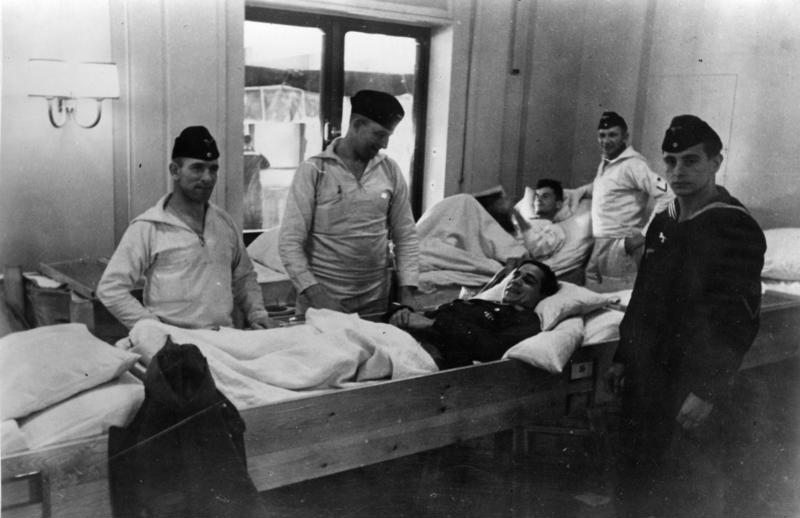
German soldiers wounded at Narvik being transported back to Germany on the Wilhelm Gustloff in July 1940.

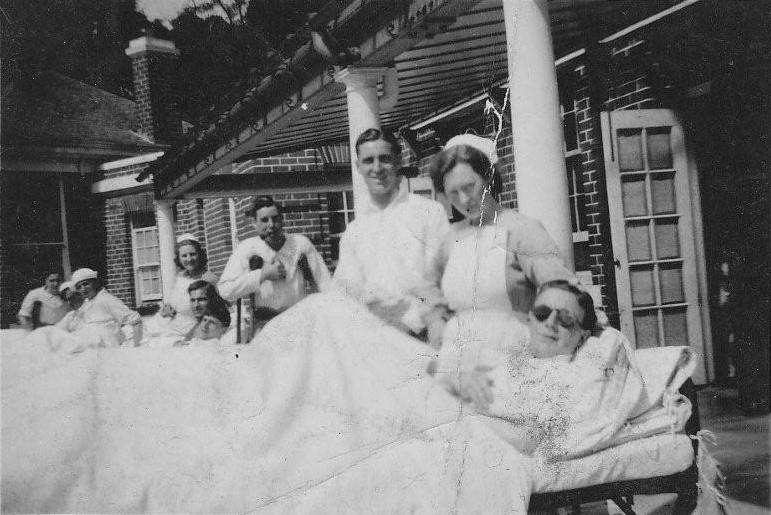
British soldiers wounded at Narvik recuperating in Mearnskirk Hospital, Glasgow, Scotland.

The British had drafted plans to land in Narvik before the German invasion; troops and supplies had been loaded onto ships when they executed their mining operation on 8 April. These had been hastily unloaded when German ships were spotted northbound because the British thought that the German ships were trying to break into the Atlantic to avoid being trapped in German ports and wanted all their ships available to intercept the German fleet. The confusion dogged the troops for weeks, men and equipment were shipped to Norway separately without clear landing sites and orders were changed while en route. It became apparent that the Allies were confused by the many small and large fjords and bays and could not decide where it would be best to start; British, French and Polish units rapidly relieved each other which added to the lack of local knowledge.

The cold and snow was a common enemy for all troops at Narvik but most of the Allies were poorly prepared for it. The Norwegians were the only ones fully equipped with skis and able to use them. The British tried skis but their troops were largely untrained and supply was scarce. German sailors faced the same problems, even within the Gebirgsjäger (mountain troops) and French mountain specialists, only a few units were equipped with skis and the Polish mountain brigade had no mountain training.

Most troops were untested in battle. The Gebirgsjäger had participated in the invasion of Poland and some of the troops that had been air dropped over Bjørnfjell had fought in the Netherlands. Some of the French Foreign Legionnaires came directly from fighting in North Africa and most of the Polish officers and many of the soldiers had participated in the defence of Poland, some even in the Spanish Civil War and were highly motivated.

The Allies had sea and air superiority until the very last stage of the operation, but did not take full advantage. The Germans lost the naval battle, but achieved the main goal of their operation: the successful Operation Weserübung and occupation of Norway. Around Narvik, German naval losses were high: they lost 10 destroyers (50 percent of their entire destroyer force), one submarine, and several support ships. In exchange, they sank one aircraft carrier, four Allied destroyers and damaged several others. The reason for their defeat lay in the German plans, which made it impossible for their destroyers to retire quickly, even if they had had adequate supplies. This was compounded by the design of German destroyers: despite their relatively large size and armament, they had inadequate fuel and ammunition storage. The British forces achieved an indisputable local naval victory but were unprepared to follow it up with any land operation. This allowed the Germans to consolidate their foothold in Norway and made the subsequent Allied counter-invasion more difficult.

=== Post-war ===
In 1964, a war museum opened in Narvik; since 2016, the collections have been displayed in the Narvik War Museum—located inside the Narvik War and Peace Centre.

Parts of the bow of the German destroyer Georg Thiele remain visible above the water in Rombaksbotn to this day. The wrecks at Narvik remain popular diving spots, although some are off-limits because they still contain undetonated ammunition. Three of the German destroyers were raised in 1964 and moved to Framnesodden, near Eidsvoid, to clear the shipping lane. The destroyers Anton Schmitt, Diether von Roeder, and Wilhelm Heidkamp rest in 12 m (39 ft) of water there and were opened for diving. A number of other wrecks are also accessible, but most have been preserved as historic sites and it is forbidden to dive to them.

== Medals ==
At least 1,200 French, British, and Polish participants in the battle were awarded the Norwegian War Cross for their contribution to the battle. Among the Norwegians who took part in the battle, only the top two military leaders were awarded the medal. Norwegian media has complained about this limited award.

All German forces (8,577 military personnel) who partook in the battles of Narvik were awarded with the Narvik Shield.

== See also ==
- List of Norwegian military equipment of World War II
- List of British military equipment of World War II
- List of French military equipment of World War II
- List of German military equipment of World War II
