= Vassdalen =

Valley in Narvik Municipality, Norway

Vassdalen (Norwegian); Áravuopmi (Northern Sami)
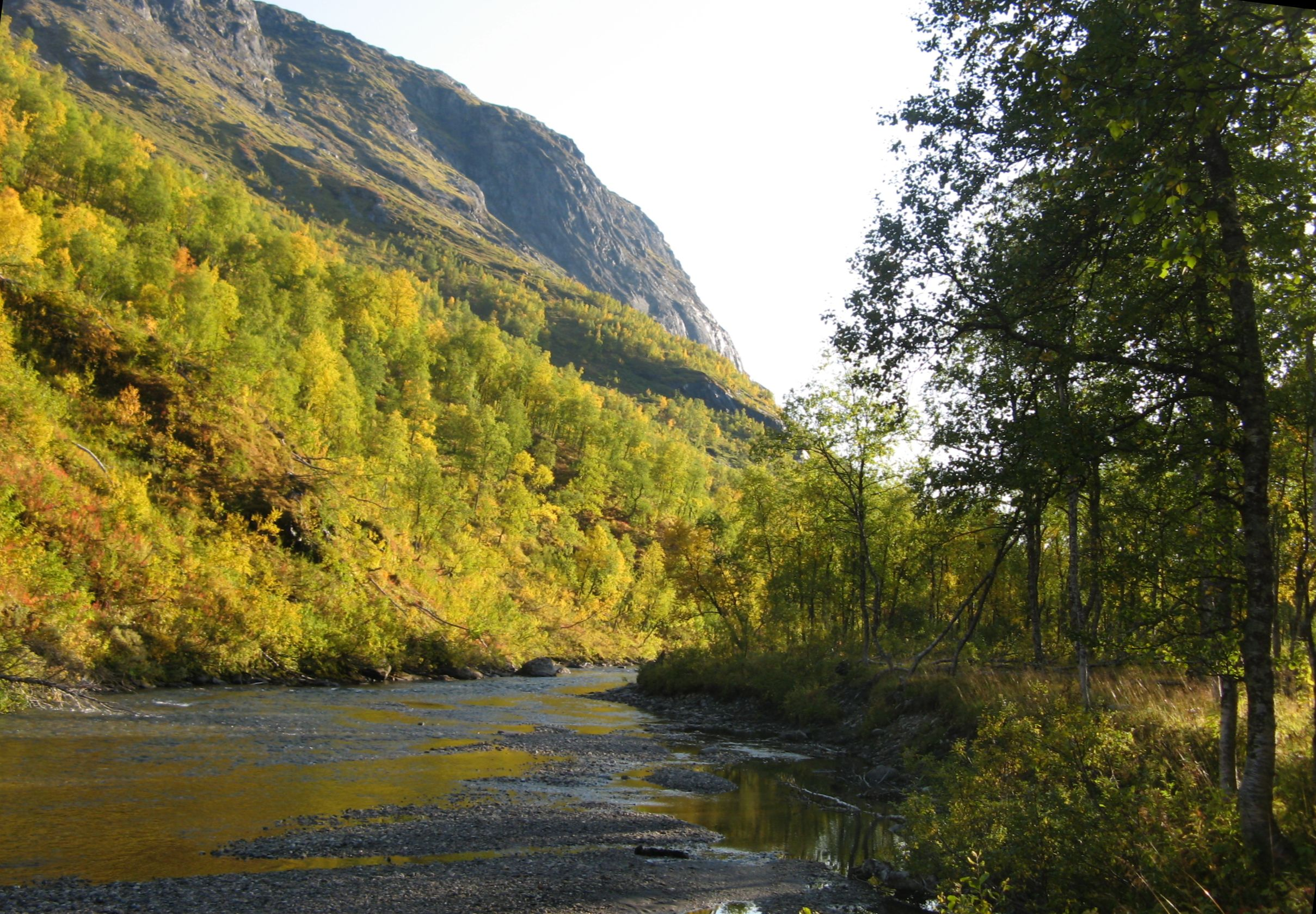
- View of Vassdalselva that flows through the valley, and the mountain of Storebalak

Geology
- Type: River valley

Geography
- Location: Narvik, Nordland, Norway
- Coordinates: 68.5579°N 17.7222°E

Location
- Interactive map of the valley

Vassdalen (Norwegian) or Áravuopmi (Northern Sami) is a valley and rural village area in Narvik Municipality in Nordland county, Norway. The river Vassdalselva flows through Vassdalen into the lake of Hartvikvatnet. The river from Hartvikvatnet is called Elvegårdselva, flowing westwards and emptying into the Herjangsfjorden at the village of Bjerkvik.

== 1986 avalanche ==
An avalanche in Vassdalen on 5 March 1986 struck 31 soldiers from the North Norway Brigade who took part in the NATO winter exercise Anchor Express. Sixteen soldiers were killed in the accident. The avalanche came down the 766-metre (2,513 ft) tall mountain Storebalak. The avalanche hit the valley about 5 kilometres (3.1 mi) above the lake Hartvikvatnet.
