= Hartvikvatnet =

Lake in Nordland, Norway

Hartvikvatnet (Norwegian); Árajávri (Northern Sami)
- Interactive map of the lake
- Location: Nordland
- Coordinates: 68.5560°N 17.6815°E
- Basin countries: Norway
- Max. length: 2 kilometres (1.2 mi)
- Max. width: 1.5 kilometres (0.93 mi)
- Surface area: 2.3 km^{2} (0.89 sq mi)
- Shore length^{1}: 7.32 kilometres (4.55 mi)
- Surface elevation: 78 metres (256 ft)
- References: NVE
- ^{1} Shore length is not a well-defined measure.

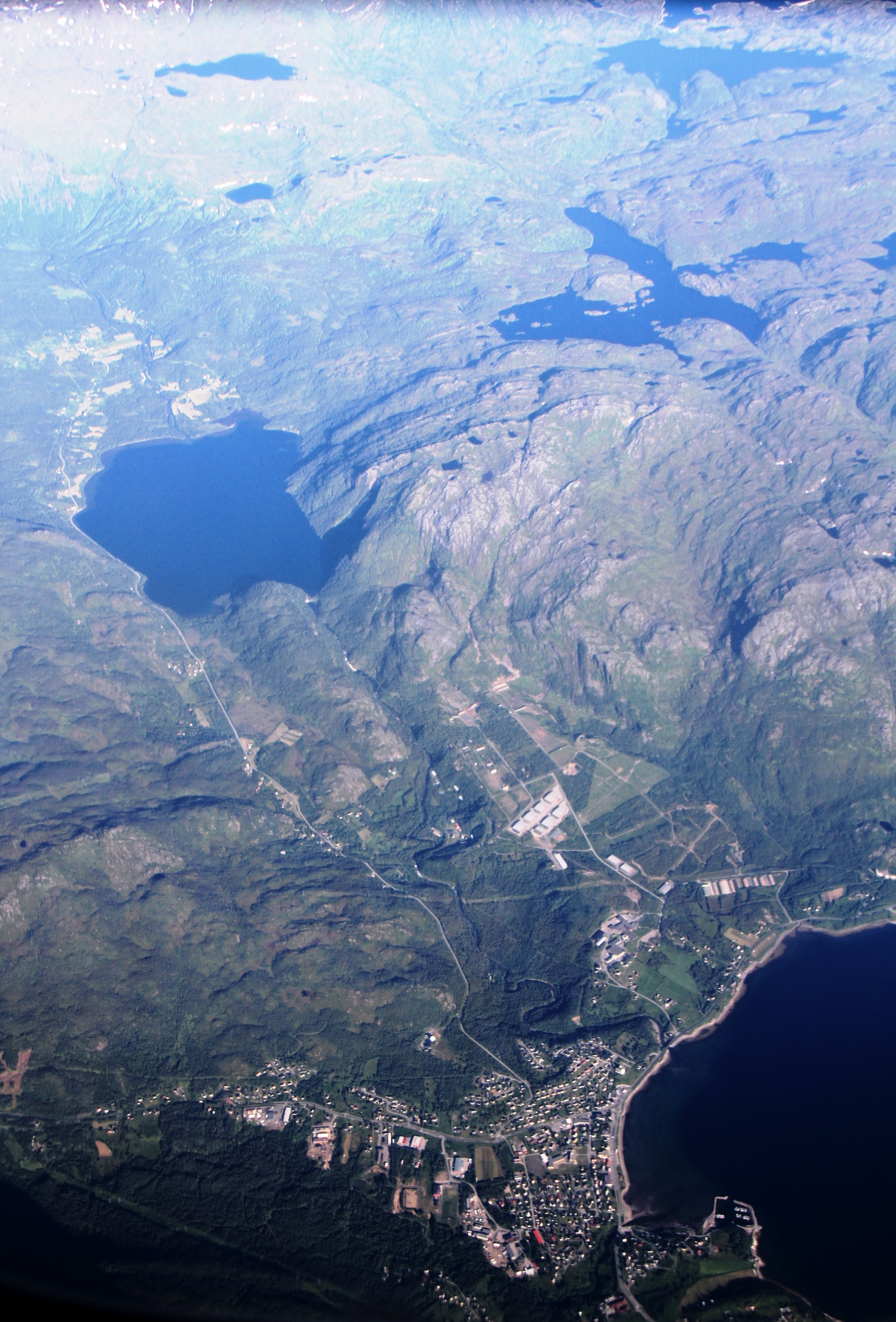

Hartvikvatnet (Norwegian) or Árajávri (Northern Sami) is a lake in Narvik Municipality in Nordland county, Norway. The 2.3-square-kilometre (0.89 sq mi) lake is located about 4 kilometres (2.5 mi) east of the village of Bjerkvik and just less than 20 kilometres (12 mi) with the border with Sweden. The Elvegårdsmoen military camp lies just west of the lake.

In April 1940, 11 German Junkers Ju 52 planes landed on the frozen lake with supplies for the German forces during the Battle of Narvik. 10 of the planes were not able to take off and were left on the ice. In the 1980s, some of the wrecks were salvaged, and are noe on display in museums in Norway and Germany. Three plane wrecks are still in Hartvigvatnet.

== See also ==
- List of lakes in Norway
