= Marina Lee =

Russian ballerina and Nazi spy

Marina Lee, also known as Marina Lie (1902 – December 1976) was a ballerina and Nazi spy during World War II.

== Background ==
Lee was born in Saint Petersburg, Russia then fled in 1917 when her parents were killed by the Bolsheviks. Lee settled in Scandinavia and was trained as a ballerina.

== MI5 file ==
The intelligence assessment on Lee is part of a cache of files from Britain's MI5, Britain's domestic spy agency, released on 26 August 2010 by The National Archives in the United Kingdom.

== Espionage activities ==
Lee began working for Nazi Germany as early as 1937. Declassified government documents reflect that Lee stole battle plans, which led to the fall of Norway to Nazi Germany in 1940. Lee made good use of a Red Cross uniform in order to infiltrate the headquarters of the British Expeditionary Forces in Norway, and made her way to information about the plan drawn up by British commander Field Marshal Claude Auchinleck. German commander General Eduard Dietl, who was holding the Norwegian port of Narvik, was reportedly considering a withdrawal, but the disclosure of these details meant his forces could block the Auchinleck plan. British, French and Norwegian troops were later forced to withdraw from German controlled Norway.

== Detection ==
Lee's existence was discovered by the British in late 1940, when German spies posing as meteorologists were captured by the Royal Navy on an Arctic island. One spy, Hans von Finckenstein, revealed Lee's identity and the key role that German intelligence believed she had played at Narvik. At least two more captured Germans later confirmed Finckenstein's revelations.

== Later years ==
In 1947 an alert was issued, warning police and border guards that her arrival in Britain should be reported to MI5 immediately. Lee disappeared for a period of time and was last spotted by MI5 in 1948 at the Ritz Hotel in Madrid, Spain travelling under a Polish passport. Lee's MI5 file contains no further reports and was closed in 1960.

The last entry in Lee's MI5 file speculates that she might have transferred her allegiance to the KGB. Despite the fate of her parents in the Soviet Union, she had been a friend of Joseph Stalin and senior figures in Moscow. In fact, Lee's MI5 dossier noted she is "just the type to transfer her allegiance once they have had a taste of the game." She is widely believed to have died in Barcelona in 1976.

== See also ==
- Battles of Narvik
- History of Germany during World War II
