= Elvegårdsmoen =

Military camp in Narvik, Norway

- Narvik Municipality, Norway

Site information
- Controlled by: Norway

Location
- Interactive map of the lake
- Coordinates: 68.545°N 17.591°E

Site history
- Battles/wars: Battles of Narvik

Elvegårdsmoen is a military training camp site in Narvik Municipality in Nordland county, Norway. It is located in the inner end of Herjangsfjorden, on the southeast side of the village of Bjerkvik. The site was of some importance during the German invasion of Norway in April 1940 and the subsequent Norwegian Campaign. The camp was occupied by German forces on 9 April 1940, and it was recaptured by soldiers from the French Foreign Legion during the Battles of Narvik on 13 May 1940.
