= Bjerkvik Church =

Church in Nordland, Norway

- Bjerkvik kirke
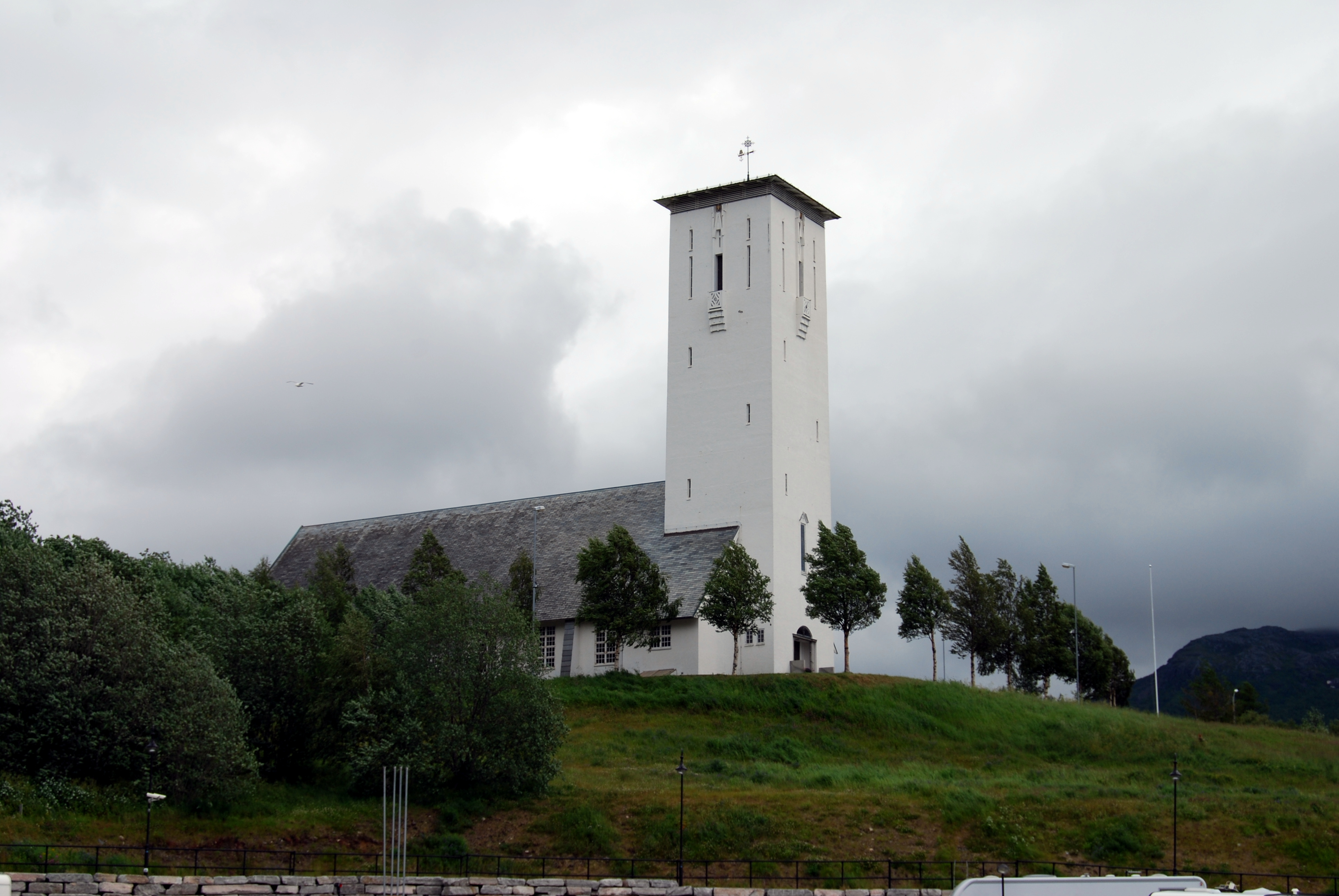
- View of the church
- Bjerkvik Church
- 68.54845687°N 17.56153822°E
- Location: Narvik Municipality, Nordland
- Country: Norway
- Denomination: Church of Norway
- Churchmanship: Evangelical Lutheran

History
- Status: Parish church
- Founded: 1914
- Consecrated: 14 Aug 1955

Architecture
- Functional status: Active
- Architect(s): Arnstein Arneberg and Per Solemslie
- Architectural type: Long church
- Completed: 1955 (71 years ago)

Specifications
- Capacity: 320
- Materials: Concrete

Administration
- Diocese: Sør-Hålogaland
- Deanery: Ofoten prosti
- Parish: Bjerkvik
- Norwegian Cultural Heritage Site
- Type: Church
- Status: Not protected
- ID: 83897

Bjerkvik Church (Norwegian: Bjerkvik kirke) is a parish church of the Church of Norway in Narvik Municipality in Nordland county, Norway. It is located in the village of Bjerkvik. It is the church for the Bjerkvik parish which is part of the Ofoten prosti (deanery) in the Diocese of Sør-Hålogaland. The white, concrete church was built in a long church style in 1955 using plans drawn up by the architects Arnstein Arneberg and Per Solemslie. The church seats about 320 people.

== History ==
The first church was built in Bjerkvik in 1914. Allied forces destroyed it on 13 April 1940, during World War II. Its replacement was completed in 1955 and consecrated that same year on 14 August by the Bishop Wollert Krohn-Hansen.

== Media gallery ==
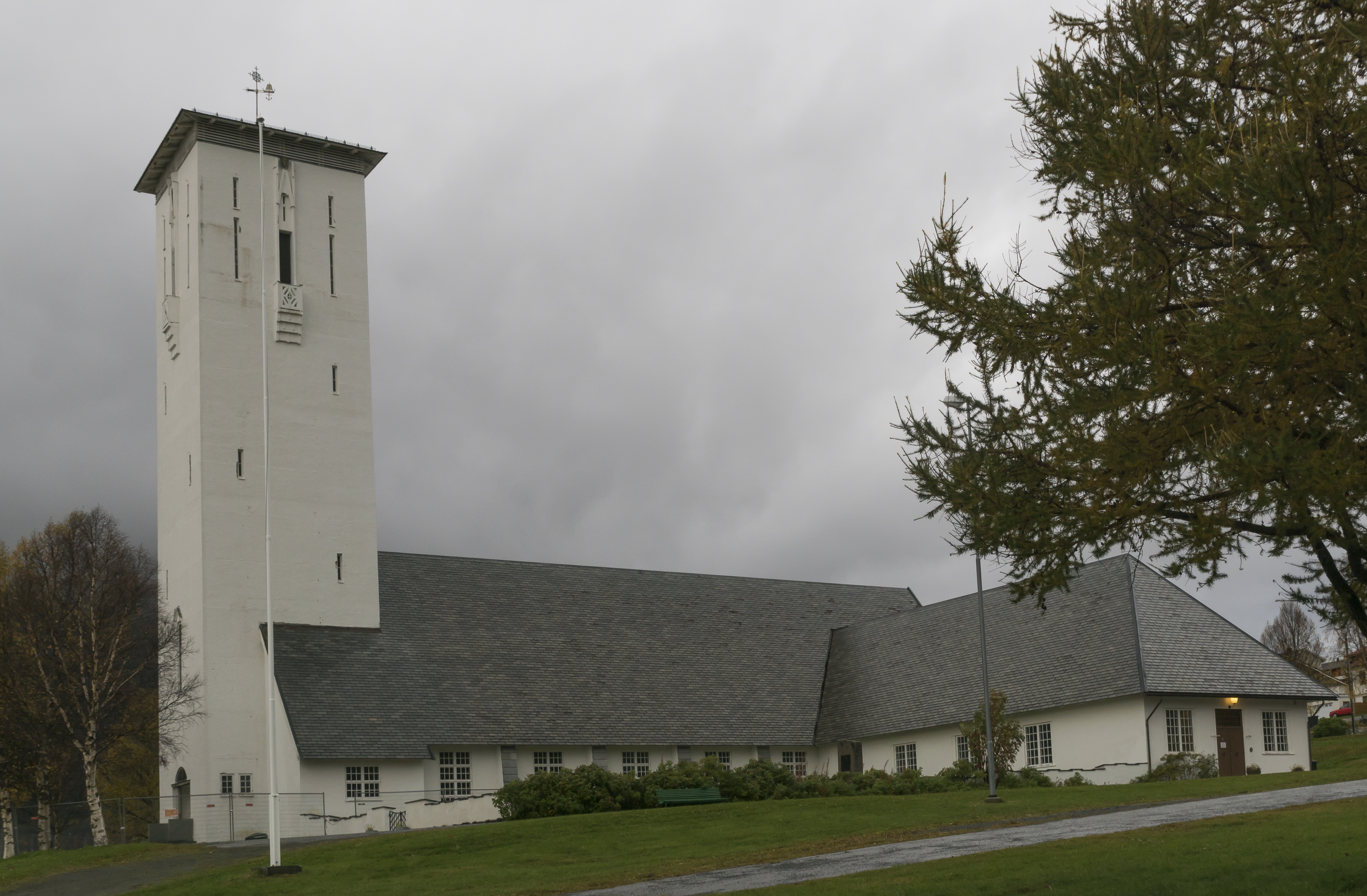

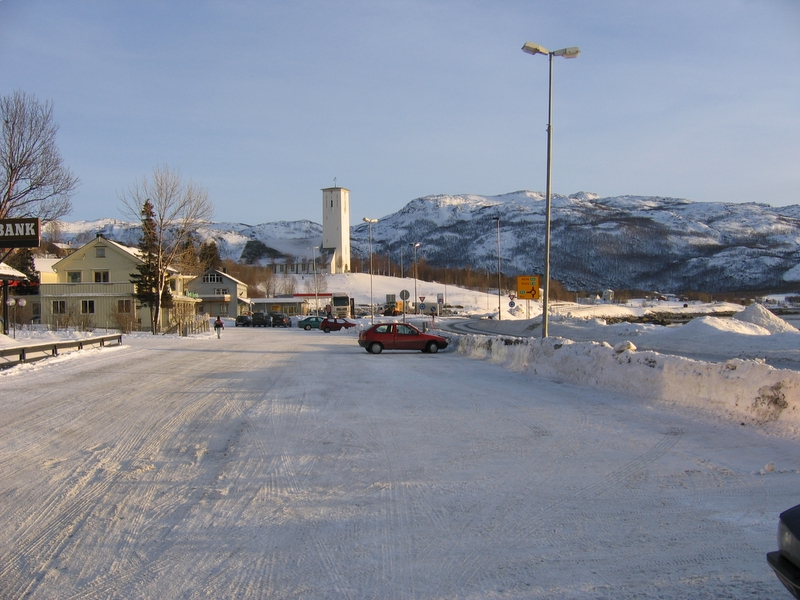

== See also ==
- List of churches in Sør-Hålogaland
