= Konrad Sundlo =

Norwegian officer

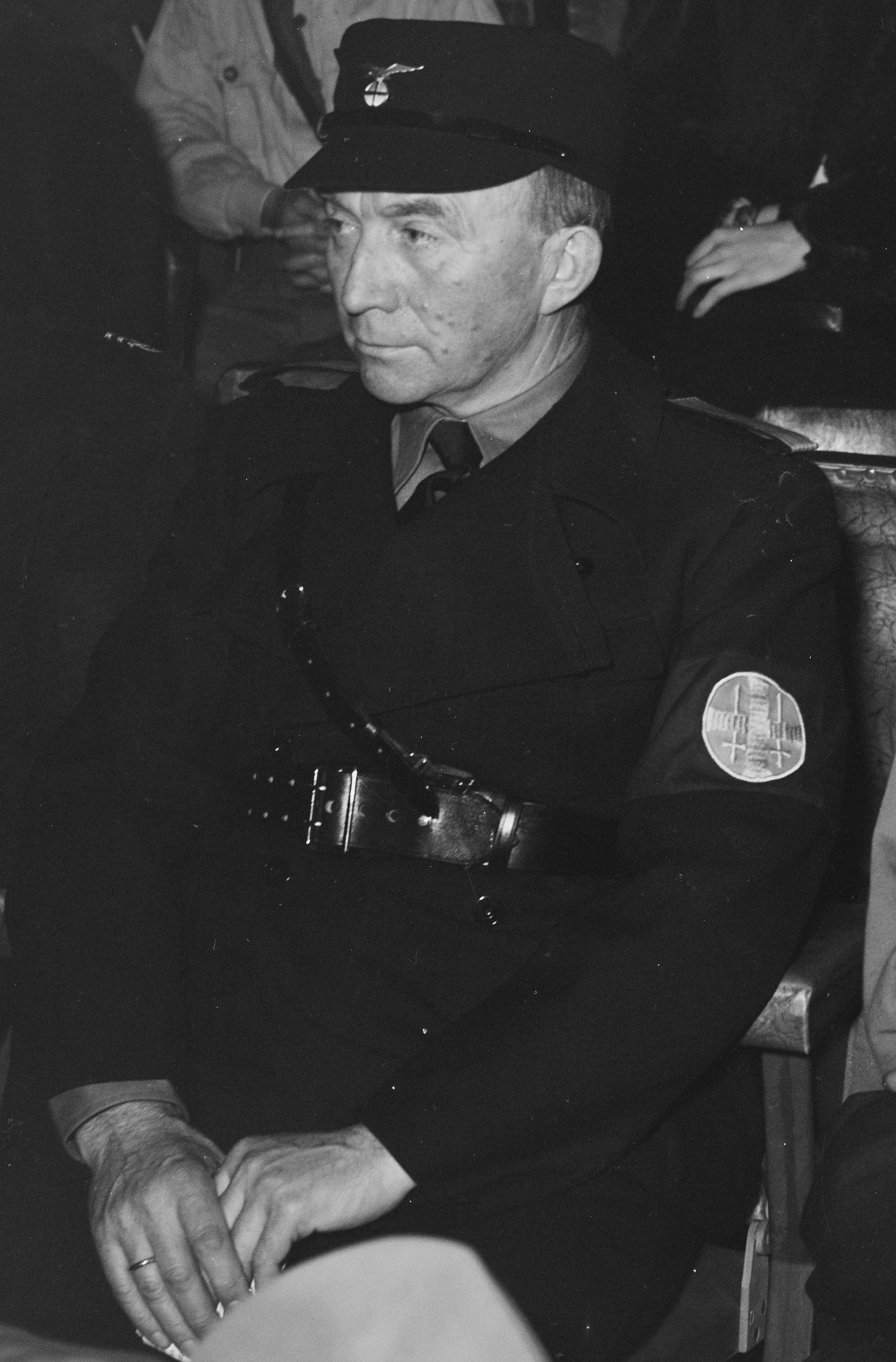
Konrad Sundlo

Konrad Sundlo (born in 1881 in Kristiansand, Norway, died 25 May 1965 on Nesøya, Asker, Norway) was a Norwegian officer and politician in Nasjonal Samling before and during Second World War.

He was sentenced to life imprisonment during the post-war legal purge in Norway.

== Background ==
Sundlo was educated as an officer and graduated from the Norwegian Military Academy in 1902. He joined Nasjonal Samling in 1933, and was appointed commander of Infantry Regiment 15 the same year.

== Second World War ==
When the Germans invaded Norway 9 April 1940, Sundlo held the rank of colonel and was commander-in-chief for Narvik area.

When the Norwegian fascist leader Vidkun Quisling visited Adolf Hitler in Berlin in the autumn of 1939, he had shown the German Führer a letter sent to him by Sundlo, and described the latter as pro-German. This gave the Germans the impression that Sundlo would not oppose a German landing at Narvik. It is not known whether or not Sundlo was aware that Quisling had passed on his letter to the Germans.

During the German occupation Sundlo was Rikshirdsjef (paramilitary collaborationist commander) from the autumn of 1940. After that he served as the collaborationist county governor of Oslo and Akershus from 1943 to 1944 and lastly in Sogn og Fjordane until the end of the war.

After the surrender of Narvik on 9 April 1940, Sundlo was accused of treason by his divisional commander, General Carl Gustav Fleischer. However, the post-war trials only found that Sundlo had committed "negligent offences" at Narvik in 1940. He was still found guilty for a number of other acts during the occupation, and sentenced to life in prison. A minority of three of the eight judges at his trial voted for a death sentence. Sundlo was pardoned in 1952 and died in 1965.

Government offices
Preceded by Edvard C. Stenersen (Acting governor)	County Governor of Akershus & Oslo; 1943–30 June 1944 (Appointed by the WWII occupation government)	Succeeded by Ole Eberhard Rømcke
Preceded by Vidar Atne (Acting governor)	County Governor of Sogn og Fjordane; 1 July 1944–1945 (Appointed by the WWII occupation government)	Succeeded by Nikolai Schei
