= Bjerkvik =

Village in Narvik Municipality, Norway

Bjerkvik: Bjerkvik (Norwegian); Rahkka (Northern Sami)
- Village
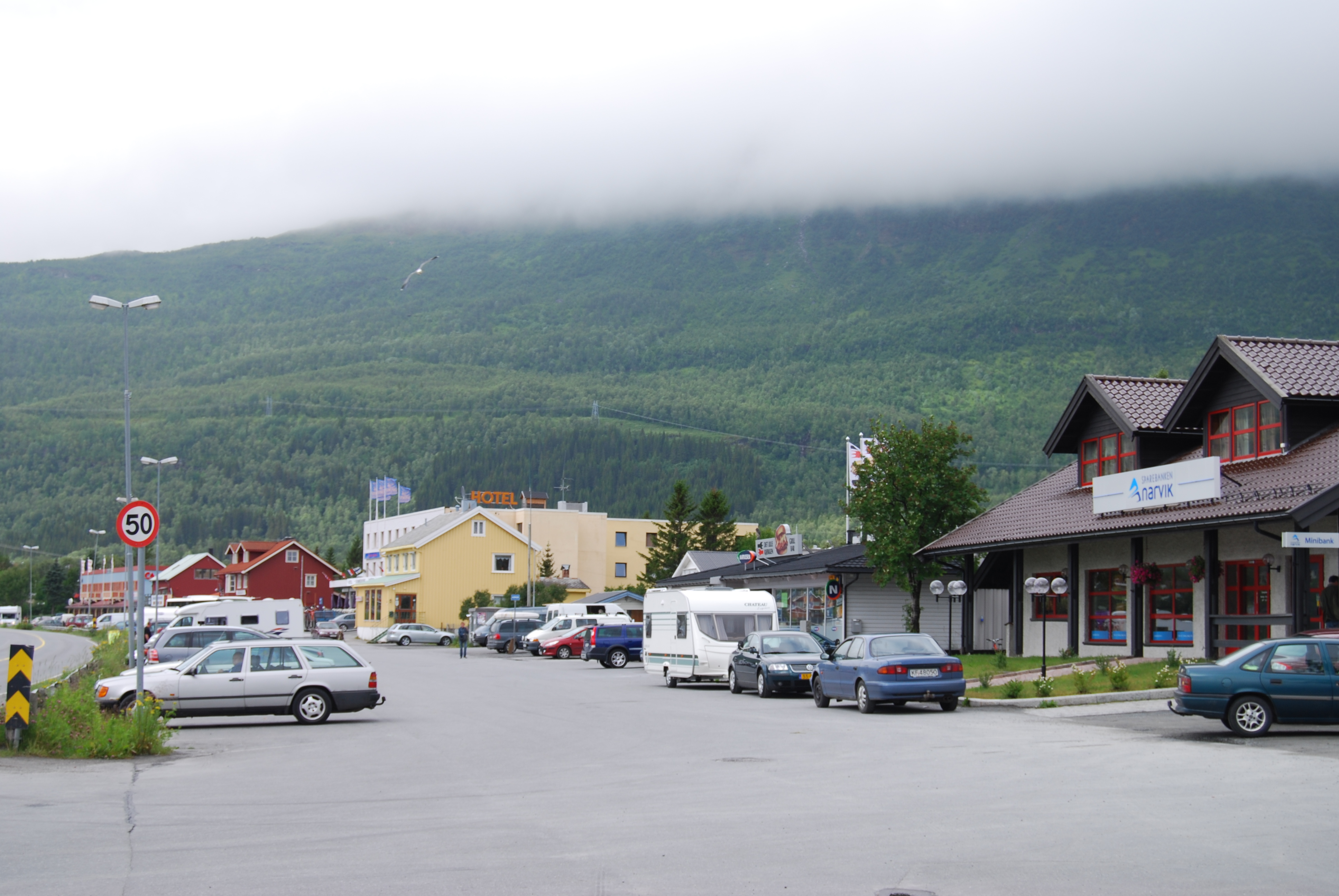
- View of Bjerkvik
- Interactive map of Bjerkvik
- Location within Nordland Location within Norway
- Coordinates: 68.5492°N 17.5571°E
- Country: Norway
- Region: Northern Norway
- County: Nordland
- District: Ofoten
- Municipality: Narvik Municipality

Area
  - Total: 1.34 km^{2} (0.52 sq mi)
- Elevation: 6 m (20 ft)

Population (2023)
  - Total: 1,088
  - Density: 812/km^{2} (2,100/sq mi)
- Time zone: UTC+01:00 (CET)
  - Summer (DST): UTC+02:00 (CEST)
- Post Code: 8530 Bjerkvik

Bjerkvik (Norwegian) or Rahkka (Northern Sami) is a village in Narvik Municipality in Nordland county, Norway. The village is located at the end of Herjangsfjorden, an arm of Ofotfjorden. Bjerkvik sits less than 20 kilometres (12 mi) south of the border of Troms county and about 13 kilometres (8.1 mi) across the fjord from the town of Narvik. The 1.34-square-kilometre (330-acre) village has a population (2023) of 1,088 and a population density of 812 inhabitants per square kilometre (2,100/sq mi).

The European route E6 and European route E10 highways meet in Bjerkvik, a central location on the roads connecting Harstad, Narvik, and Tromsø. Elvegårdsmoen military camp lies on the eastern edge of the village near the lake Hartvikvatnet.

Bjerkvik School is an elementary and secondary school in Bjerkvik. The school has about 200 pupils. The village also has two gas stations and three grocery stores. Bjerkvik Church was built here in 1955 to serve the northern part of the municipality.

== History ==
During World War II, Bjerkvik was almost destroyed by the bombardment of gunfire from allied warships that caused significant civilian casualties. A landing was also conducted in the area by a Franco-British forces, pushing the german forces several miles away.

The worst avalanche disaster in modern Norwegian history took place in Vassdalen near Bjerkvik in March 1986 when 16 Norwegian soldiers on exercise were killed.

== Media gallery ==
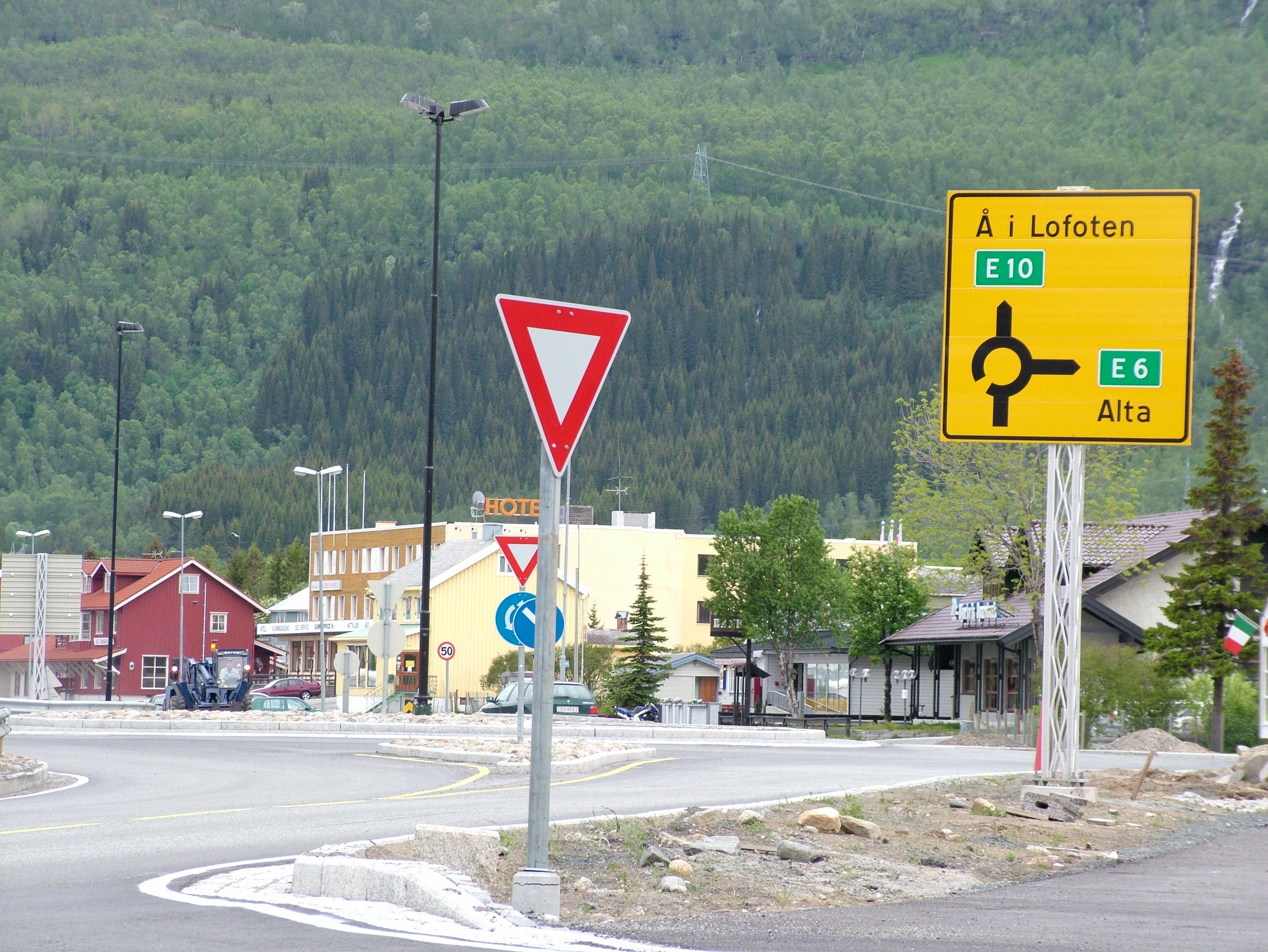
The European route E6 and E10 roads meet in Bjerkvik

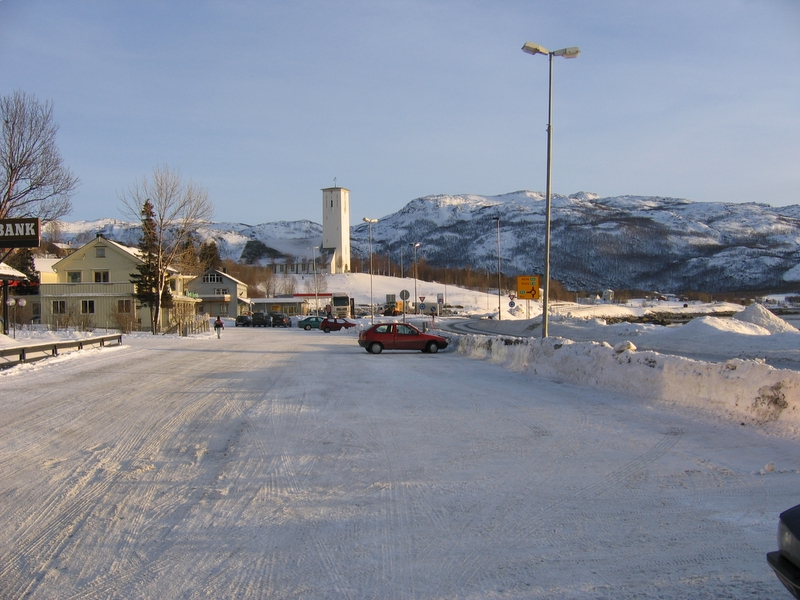
Bjerkvik

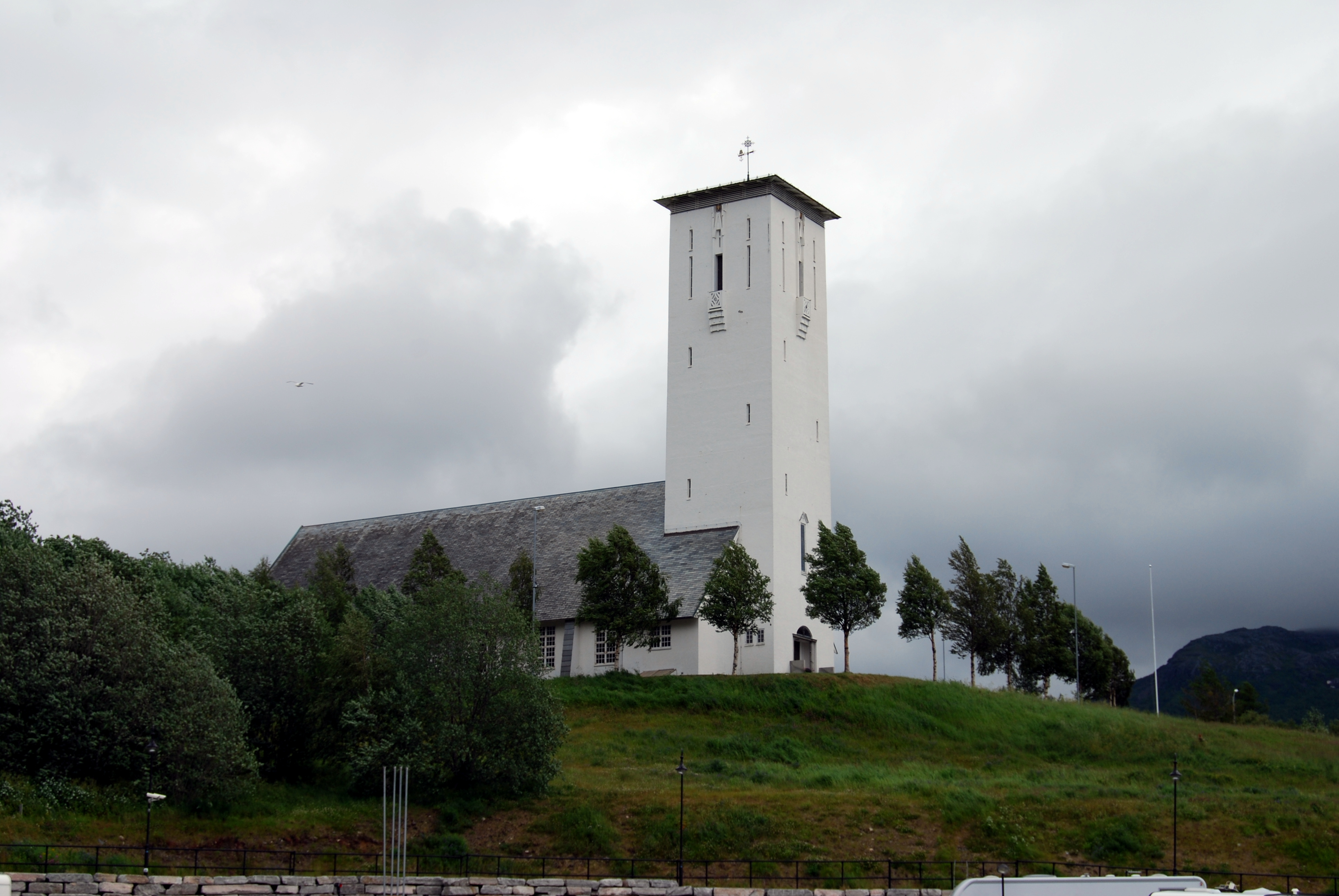
Bjerkvik Church

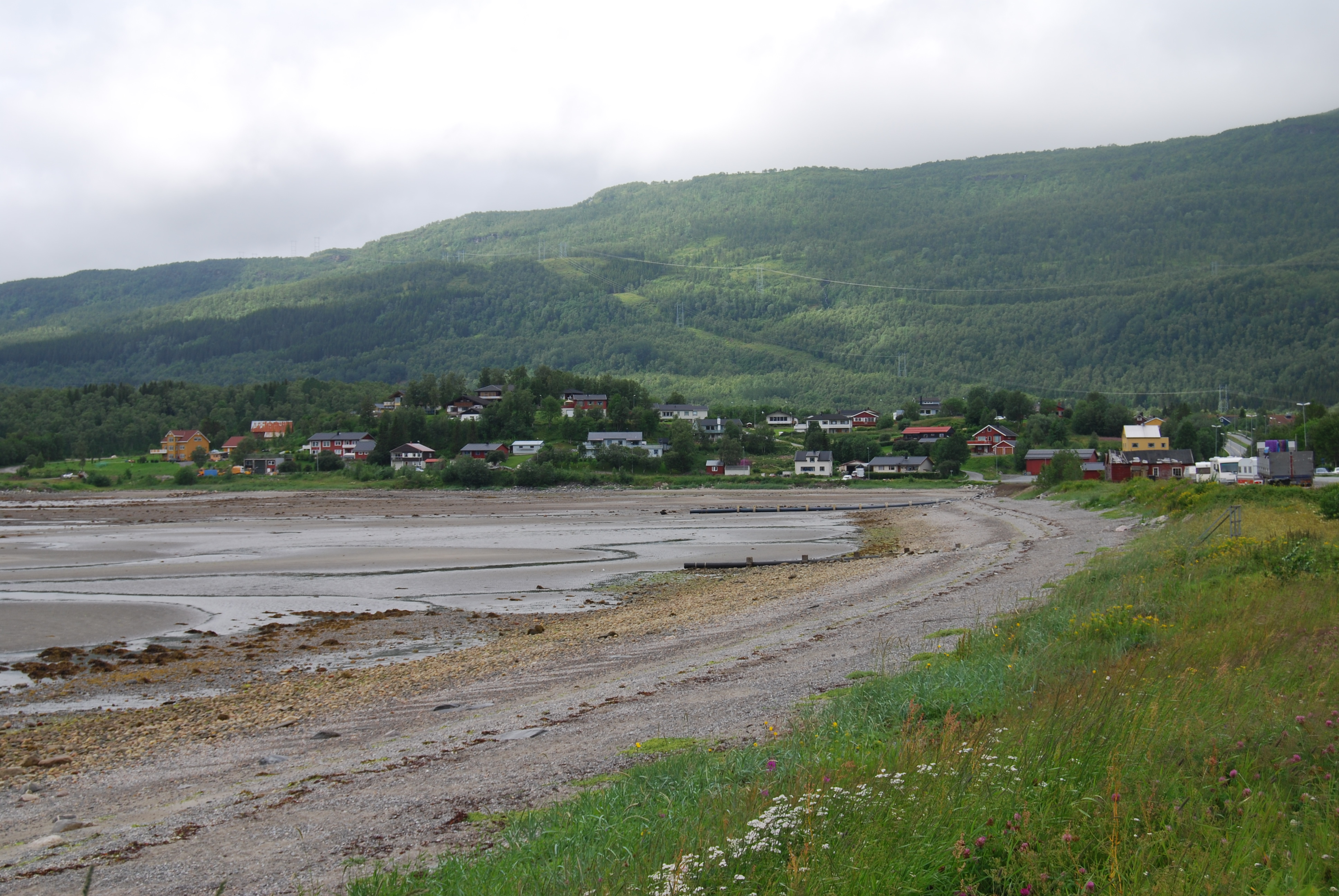
View at low tide
