= Per Askim =

Norwegian naval officer (1881–1963)

Per Askim (24 February 1881 – 8 March 1963) was a Norwegian naval officer who was in command of the two coastal defence ships defending Narvik during the German invasion of Norway on 9 April 1940.

== Personal life ==
Askim was born in Moss to military officer Carl Askim and Alette Henrikke Kristiansen. He was married to Anna Marie Hanssen from 1906 until her death in 1935, and from 1937 to Signe Hanssen, sister of his first wife.

== Career ==
=== Early career ===
Askim graduated from the Norwegian Naval Academy, and was promoted to second lieutenant in 1901. He was promoted to premier lieutenant in 1904, and to Captain in 1910. By 1934 he was promoted to the rank of Captain Commander (kommandørkaptein), and he retired from the Navy in 1936.

He worked at the Ministry of Defense from 1905 to 1907, and chaired Larvik sjømannsskole from 1907 to 1911. From 1911 to 1919 he lectured at the Norwegian Naval Academy, and worked for the Admiral staff from 1921 to 1930. From 1930 to 1939 he was section leader in the Norwegian Coastal Administration (Fyrvesenet). In 1940 he was recalled to the Navy, and given the command of the coastal defence ship HNoMS Norge, and was in charge of the coastal defence in Northern Norway.

=== Second World War ===
On 9 April 1940 Askim's ship Norge was hit by two torpedoes during a confrontation with the German destroyer Bernd von Arnim, at the Narvik Harbour. 101 men from Norge perished, while 90 were saved, including Askim.

He evacuated to Britain in 1940, and served as naval attaché in Washington from 1940 to 1943. From 1943 he served as head of the Planning section at the Norwegian High Command in London. On 8 May 1945 he was the only Norwegian member of the Allied Surrender Commission at Lillehammer, when the German general Franz Böhme signed the surrender conditions on behalf of the German troops in Norway.

=== Post war ===
From May to December 1945 Askim headed the Norwegian naval command Marinekommando Øst. He then returned to his job in the Norwegian Coastal Administration, where he worked until his retirement in 1952. He died in Oslo in 1963, at the age of 82.

== Honours ==
Askim was awarded the Norwegian War Cross with Sword for achievements during the Second World War.

== Selected works ==
- Beretning om Den norske sjøkrigsskoles virksomhet 1817–1917. 1917.
- Oslo Skoleskib. 50 årsjubileum 1931. 1931.
- Det tyske angrep på Narvik. Kommandør Askims beretning. 1947.
