= Herjangsfjord =

Fjord in Nordland, Norway

Herjangsfjorden (Norwegian); Hearjjak (Northern Sami)
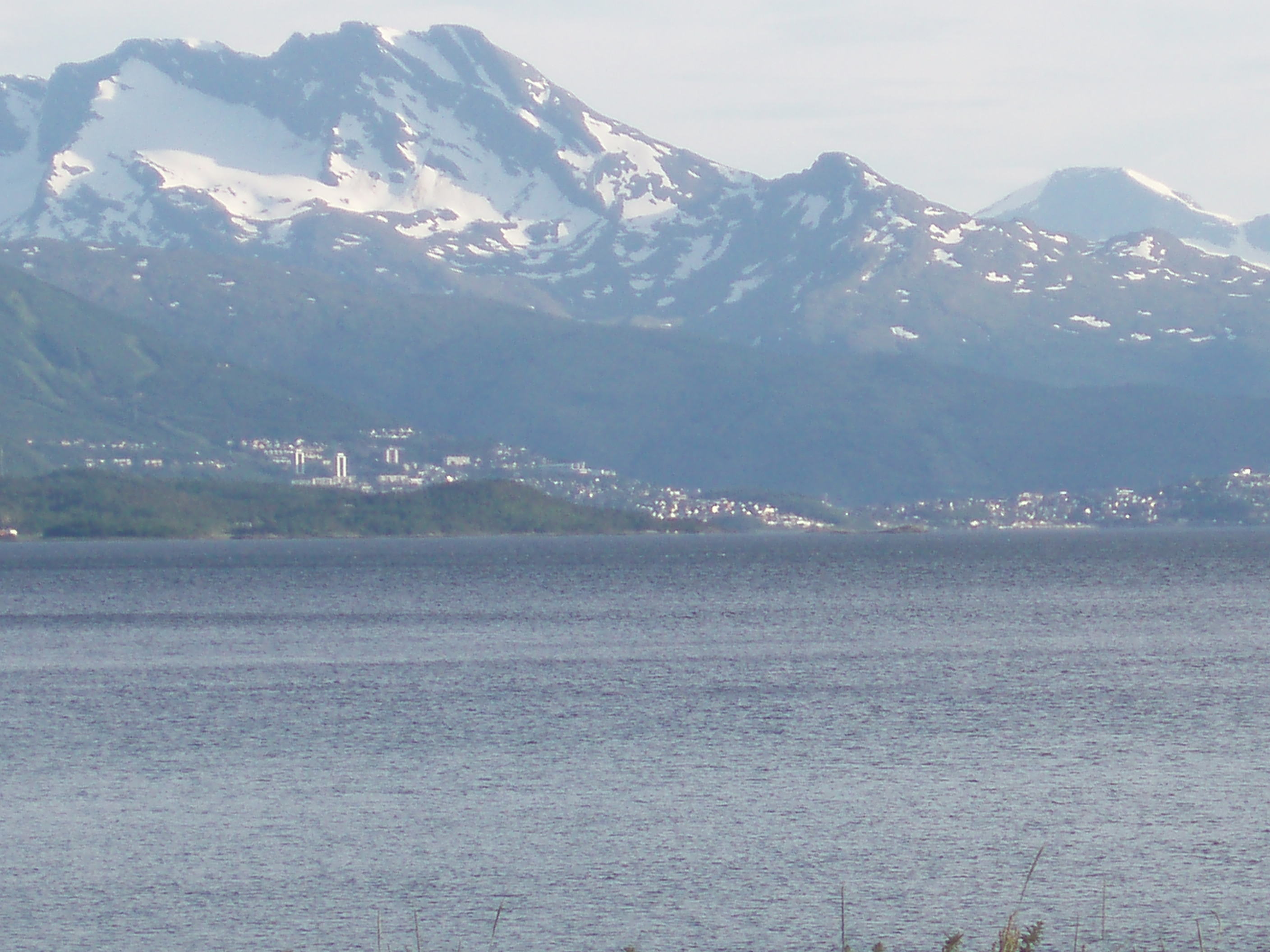
- View of the Herjangsfjord and Narvik, viewed from Bjerkvik
- Interactive map of the fjord
- Location: Nordland county, Norway
- Coordinates: 68.4648°N 17.3615°E
- Type: Fjord
- Basin countries: Norway
- Max. length: 10 kilometres (6.2 mi)

Herjangsfjorden (Norwegian) or Hearjjak (Northern Sami) (or unofficially: Herjangen) is a fjord that branches off of the Ofotfjorden in Narvik Municipality in Nordland county, Norway. The 10-kilometre (6.2 mi) long fjord is located just north of the Rombaken fjord. The villages along the fjord are Bjerkvik and Herjangen. The European route E06 and European route E10 highways run along the northern and eastern shores of the fjord.

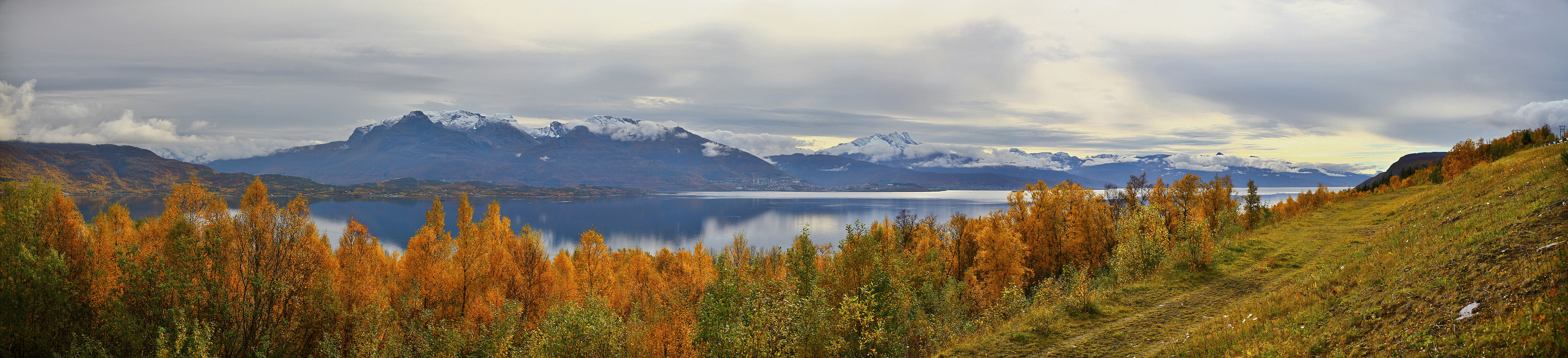
A view over the Herjangsfjord and Ofotfjord, from the north side of the fjord
