= German destroyer Z37 =

Type 1936A (Mob) destroyer

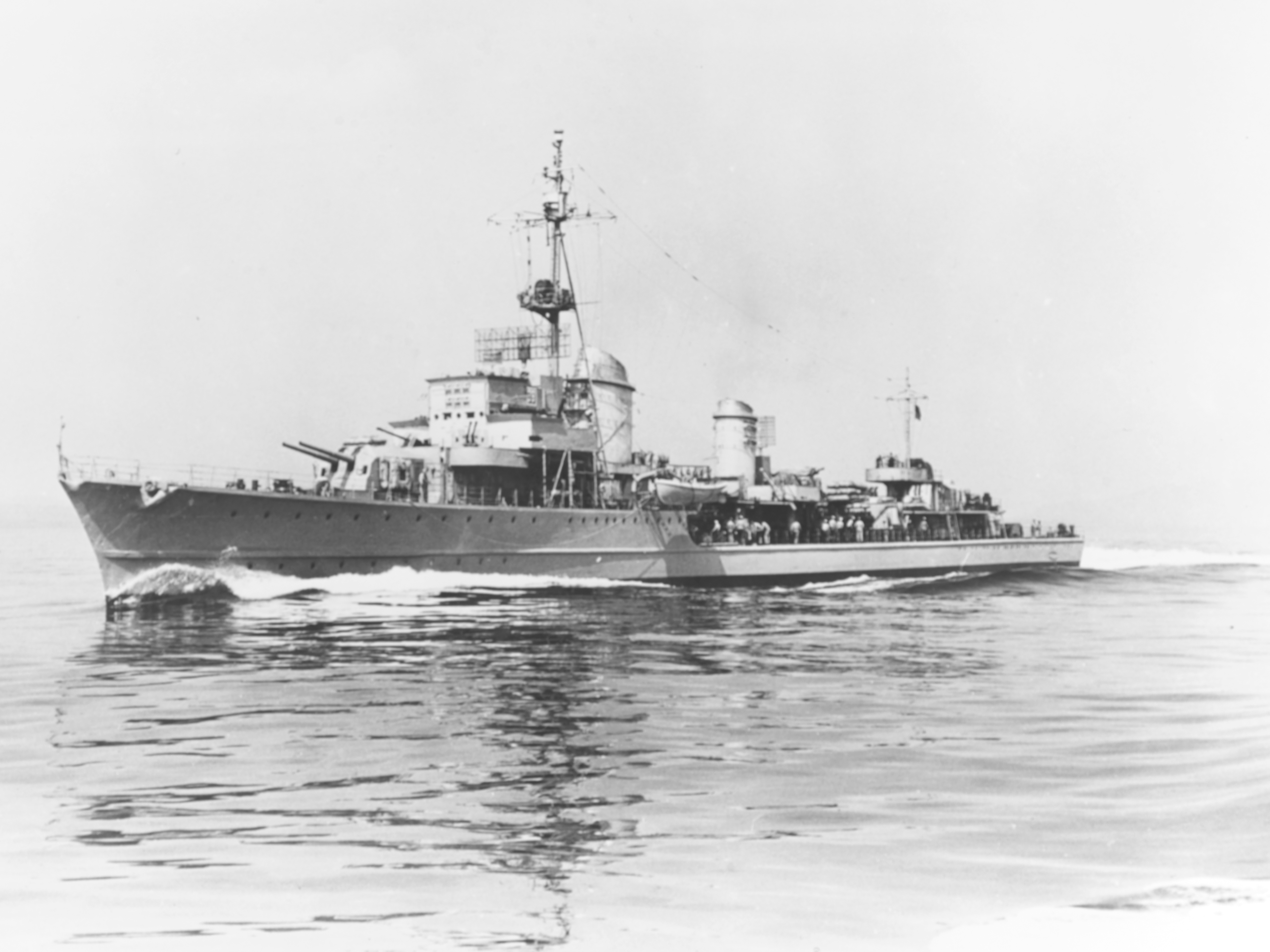
- Sister ship Z39 underway after the war

History

Nazi Germany
- Name: Z37
- Ordered: 19 September 1939
- Builder: Germaniawerft, Kiel
- Yard number: G627
- Laid down: 2 January 1941
- Launched: 24 February 1942
- Completed: 16 July 1942
- Captured: 6 May 1945
- Fate: Scuttled, 24 August 1944; Scrapped, 1949

General characteristics (as built)
- Class & type: Type 1936A (Mob) destroyer
- Displacement: 2,657 long tons (2,700 t) (standard); 3,691 long tons (3,750 t) (deep load)
- Length: 127 m (416 ft 8 in) (o/a)
- Beam: 12 m (39 ft 4 in)
- Draft: 4.62 m (15 ft 2 in)
- Installed power: 70,000 PS (51,000 kW; 69,000 shp); 6 × water-tube boilers
- Propulsion: 2 × shafts; 2 × geared steam turbine sets
- Speed: 36 knots (67 km/h; 41 mph)
- Range: 2,950 nmi (5,460 km; 3,390 mi) at 19 knots (35 km/h; 22 mph)
- Complement: 316–335
- Armament: 1 × twin, 3 × single 15 cm (5.9 in) guns; 2 × twin 3.7 cm (1.5 in) AA guns; 1 × quadruple, 3 × single 2 cm (0.8 in) AA guns; 2 × quadruple 53.3 cm (21 in) torpedo tubes; 60 mines; 4 × depth charge launchers

Z37 was a Type 1936A (Mob) destroyer built for the Kriegsmarine during World War II. Completed in 1942, the ship spent most of her brief career deployed in France. She participated in the Battle of the Bay of Biscay at the end of 1943 before she was accidentally rammed by the destroyer Z32 in early 1944. Towed back to port, the Kriegsmarine (German Navy) decided that Z37 was too badly damaged to repair and disarmed her hulk. Decommissioned later that year, she was scuttled by her crew before being scrapped by the French in 1949.

== Design and description ==
The Type 1936A (Mob) destroyers were slightly larger than the preceding Type 1936A class and had a heavier armament. They had an overall length of 127 meters (416 ft 8 in) and were 121.9 meters (399 ft 11 in) long at the waterline. The ships had a beam of 12 meters (39 ft 4 in) and a maximum draft of 4.62 meters (15 ft 2 in). They displaced 2,657 long tons (2,700 t) at standard load and 3,691 long tons (3,750 t) at deep load. The two Wagner geared steam turbine sets, each driving one propeller shaft, were designed to produce 70,000 PS (51,000 kW; 69,000 shp) using steam provided by six Wagner water-tube boilers. The ships had a design speed of 36 knots (67 km/h; 41 mph), but their maximum was 35.5 knots (65.7 km/h; 40.9 mph). The Type 1936A (Mob)-class destroyers carried enough fuel oil to give a range of 2,239 nautical miles (4,147 km; 2,577 mi) at a speed of 19 knots (35 km/h; 22 mph). The crew of the ships numbered 11–15 officers and 305–21 enlisted men, plus an additional 4 officers and 19 enlisted men if serving as a flotilla flagship.

The Type 1936A (Mob) ships were armed with five 15-centimeter (5.9 in) TbtsK C/36 guns in a twin-gun turret forward and three single mounts with gun shields aft of the main superstructure. Their anti-aircraft armament varied and Z37's consisted of four 3.7-centimeter (1.5 in) SK C/30 guns in a pair of twin mounts abreast the rear funnel and seven 2-centimeter (0.79 in) C/38 guns in one quadruple and three single mounts. The ships carried eight 53.3-centimeter (21 in) torpedo tubes in two power-operated mounts. A pair of reload torpedoes was provided for each mount. They had four depth charge launchers and mine rails could be fitted on the rear deck that had a maximum capacity of 60 mines. A system of passive hydrophones designated as 'GHG' (Gruppenhorchgerät) was fitted to detect submarines. A S-Gerät sonar was also probably fitted. Z37 was equipped with a FuMO 21 or FuMO 24 radar set above the bridge.

=== Modifications ===
Another quadruple 2 cm mount replaced the forward single 2 cm gun sometime after early 1943. The ship was fitted with a FuMB Metox radar detector after commissioning.

== Service history ==
Z37 was first ordered from Oderwerke Stettin as a Type 1938B destroyer on 26 June 1939, but the German Navy cancelled the order in September 1939, re-ordering the ship as yard number G627 from Germaniawerft as a Type 1936A (Mob) destroyer on 19 September 1939. The ship was laid down at Germaniawerft's Kiel shipyard on 2 January 1940 and launched on 24 February 1941. Construction was slowed by shortage of manpower and materials and Z37 was not commissioned until 16 July 1942.

On 23 January 1943 Z37 set out as part of the escort for the battleship Scharnhorst and heavy cruiser Prinz Eugen from the Baltic Sea to Norway, but the operation was cancelled when the force was spotted by British aircraft. On 5 March 1943, the 8th Destroyer Flotilla (Z23, Z24, Z32 and Z37) was transferred via the English Channel to the French Atlantic coast in Operation Karin. Despite attacks by British coastal artillery and motor torpedo boats, the Flotilla managed to pass through the Straits of Dover unscathed, but Z37 ran aground at Le Havre on 6 March, damaging her starboard propeller, and was under repair until 18 March.

On 28 March, Z37 was one of four destroyers that formed the distant escort for the Italian blockade runner Himalaya setting out from Bordeaux for the Far East, with 9 torpedo boats providing a close escort, but the force turned back when spotted by British air reconnaissance. On 30 March, Z37, together with the destroyers Z23, Z24 and Z32, set out to meet the incoming blockade runner Pietro Orseolo. Heavy British air attacks were repelled, but Pietro Orseolo was damaged by a torpedo from the American submarine Shad before reaching safety in the Gironde estuary on 2 April. On 9 April, Z37 set out on another attempt to cover the break out of Himalaya, but again this was foiled by British air attacks.

On 24 December 1943, six destroyers of the 8th Destroyer Flotilla (Z37, Z23, Z24, Z27 and ZH1) and the 4th Torpedo Boat Flotilla (of six torpedo boats) set out to meet the blockade runner Osorno, meeting her on 25 December. They managed to escort Osorno to the Gironde despite heavy air attack, but Orsono struck a submerged wreck and had to be beached to save her cargo. On 26 December, the 8th Destroyer Flotilla, again including Z37 (but without ZH1) and the 4th Torpedo Boat Flotilla set out again to meet another inbound blockade runner, Alsterufer. Unbeknownst to the Germans, Alsterufer was attacked and set on fire by a B-24 Liberator bomber of No. 311 (Czechoslovak) Squadron RAF on 27 December and was abandoned by her crew. At about midday on 28 December, the British cruisers Glasgow and Enterprise, on patrol in the Bay of Biscay to intercept blockade runners, encountered the German destroyers and torpedo boats, resulting in the Battle of the Bay of Biscay. Heavy seas prevented the German force from using its theoretical advantages in speed and firepower, with the destroyer Z27 and the torpedo boats T25 and T27 sunk. Z37 fired six torpedoes against the British cruisers, all of which missed.

On 30 January 1944, Z37 was carrying out exercises in the south of the Bay of Biscay with Z23 and Z32 when she collided with Z32. One of Z37's torpedoes exploded, starting a fire which set off some of her anti-aircraft ammunition and caused extensive flooding. She was towed back to Bordeaux, but the damage was considered too severe for repair, and her guns were removed to strengthen the shore defences of the Gironde estuary, with her crew being deployed as ground troops. She was decommissioned on 24 August and then scuttled. Her wreck was broken up in 1949.

== Books ==
- Friedman, Norman (1981). Naval Radar. London: Conway Maritime Press. ISBN 0-85177-238-2.
- Gröner, Erich (1990). German Warships 1815–1945. Vol. 1: Major Surface Warships. Annapolis, Maryland: Naval Institute Press. ISBN 0-87021-790-9.
- Koop, Gerhard & Schmolke, Klaus-Peter (2014). German Destroyers of World War II. Barnsley, UK: Seaforth Publishing. ISBN 978-1-84832-193-9.
- Rohwer, Jürgen (2005). Chronology of the War at Sea 1939–1945: The Naval History of World War Two (Third Revised ed.). Annapolis, Maryland: Naval Institute Press. ISBN 1-59114-119-2.
- Sieche, Erwin (1980). "Germany". In Chesneau, Roger (ed.). Conway's All the World's Fighting Ships 1922–1946. London: Conway Maritime Press. pp. 218–254. ISBN 0-85177-146-7.
- Whitley, M. J. (1991). German Destroyers of World War Two. Annapolis, Maryland: Naval Institute Press. ISBN 978-1-55750-302-2.
