= German destroyer Z32 =

Destroyer operated by the german kriegsmarine

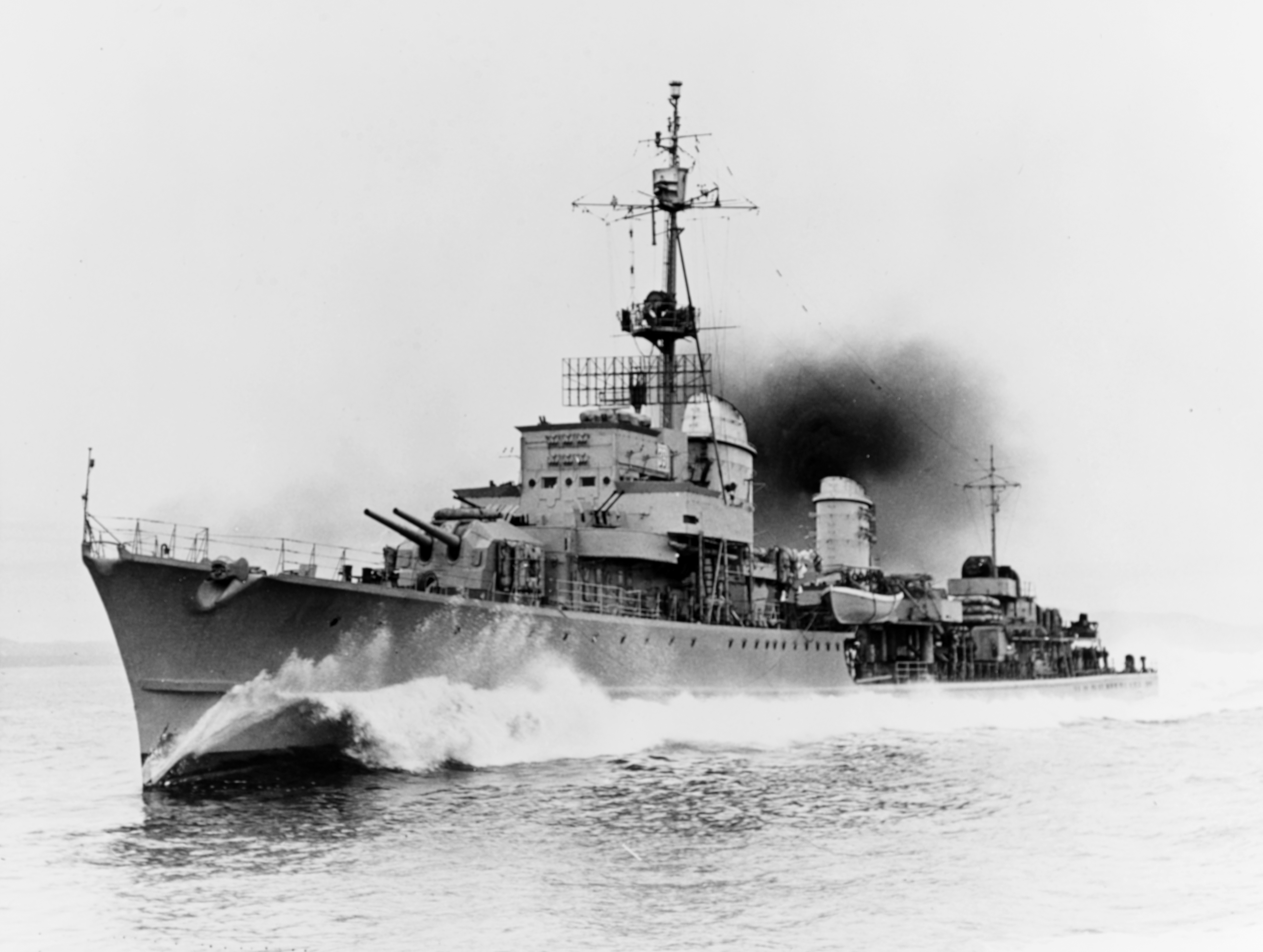
- Z39, a sister ship of Z32, underway under American control, 1945

History

Nazi Germany
- Name: Z32
- Ordered: 19 September 1939
- Builder: AG Weser (Deschimag), Bremen
- Laid down: 1 November 1940
- Launched: 15 August 1941
- Completed: 15 September 1942
- Fate: Ran aground 9 June 1944

General characteristics (as built)
- Class & type: Type 1936A (Mob) destroyer
- Displacement: 2,645 t (2,603 long tons) (standard); 3,655 t (3,597 long tons) full load
- Length: 127 m (416 ft 8 in) o/a
- Beam: 12 m (39 ft 4 in)
- Draught: 4.62 m (15 ft 2 in)
- Installed power: 70,000 shp (52,000 kW); 6 × water-tube boilers
- Propulsion: 2 × shafts; 2 × geared steam turbine sets
- Speed: 38.5 kn (71.3 km/h; 44.3 mph)
- Range: 2,239 nmi (4,147 km; 2,577 mi) at 19 knots (35 km/h; 22 mph)
- Complement: 321
- Armament: 5 × 15 cm (5.9 in) guns (1 × 2 and 3 × 1); 2 × twin 3.7 cm (1.5 in) anti-aircraft guns; 9 × 2 cm (0.8 in) (1 × 4 and 5 × 1) AA guns; 2 × quadruple 53.3 cm (21 in) torpedo tubes; 60 mines

Z32 was a German Type 1936A (Mob) destroyer, which was completed in 1942 and which served with the 8th Destroyer Flotilla of the Kriegsmarine during the Second World War. She fought in the Battle of the Bay of Biscay against HMS Glasgow and HMS Enterprise, alongside the German 8th Destroyer Flotilla and the 4th Torpedo Boat Flotilla. She mainly operated from German-occupied French Atlantic ports, escorting blockade runners and U-boats, and was sunk during the Battle of Ushant on 9 June 1944.

== Construction and design ==
On 28 June 1939, Nazi Germany placed orders for nine destroyers (Z31–Z39) of the new Type 1938B class. A further three destroyers of the class were ordered in July. The Type 1938B destroyers were relatively small, compared with the preceding Type 1936 and 1936A ships. They were to be armed with four 12.7 centimetres (5.0 in) guns in two twin turrets, and were designed for long range. Following the outbreak of the Second World War, however, orders for the Type 1938B destroyers were cancelled; Germany reverted to the Type 1936A (Mob) class, a slightly modified version of the previous Type 1936A class. On 9 September 1939, four destroyers (Z31–Z34) were re-ordered from the Deschimag consortium, to be built at the AG Weser shipyard in Bremen. A further three ships (Z37–Z39) were ordered from the Germaniawerft yard. Z32 was laid down on 1 November 1940 (with a yard number of 1002), launched on 15 August 1941 and commissioned on 15 September 1942.

Z32 was 127 metres (416 ft 8 in) in overall length and 121.9 m (399 ft 11 in) in waterline length, with a beam of 12 m (39 ft 4 in) and a draught of 3.92–4.62 m (12 ft 10 in – 15 ft 2 in), depending on displacement. Her displacement was 2,645 tonnes (2,603 long tons) standard and 3,655 t (3,597 long tons) full load. The ship's machinery consisted of six Wagner boilers feeding high-pressure superheated steam (at 70 atm (1,029 psi; 7,093 kPa) and 450 °C (842 °F)) to two sets of Wagner-geared steam turbines. Her rated power was 70,000 shaft horsepower (52,000 kW), giving the destroyer a speed of 38.5 knots (71.3 km/h; 44.3 mph). Her range was 2,239 nautical miles (4,147 km; 2,577 mi) at 19 kn (35 km/h; 22 mph). The ship had a complement of 321 officers and ratings.

Z32's main armaments were five 15 cm (5.9in) TbtsK C/36 naval guns, with one twin turret forward and three single mounts aft. Z32 was the first ship of her class to be completely fitted with the armament, as development of the twin turret had been slow. Her anti-aircraft armament consisted of two twin 3.7 cm SK C/30 anti-aircraft guns (later replaced by automatic Flak M42 guns) and nine 2 cm cannon in one quadruple and five single mounts. A second quadruple 2 cm mount was fitted forward of the ship's bridge in 1943, replacing one of the single mounts. Eight 53.3 cm (21 in) torpedo tubes in two quadruple mounts were fitted, and up to sixty mines could be carried.

== Service ==
After commissioning and work up, Z32 joined the 8th Destroyer Flotilla, which was transferred via the English Channel to the French Atlantic coast in Operation Karin from 5–8 March 1943. Despite being fired upon off the coast of Dover by British artillery, the Flotilla reached Bordeaux unscathed on 8 March. On 28 March, Z32 was one of four destroyers that formed the distant escort for the Italian blockade runner Himalaya. They set out from Bordeaux for the Far East, with nine torpedo boats providing a close escort, but the force turned back when it was spotted by British air reconnaissance. On 30 March, Z32, together with the destroyers Z23, Z24 and Z37, set out to meet the incoming blockade runner Pietro Orseolo. Heavy British air attacks were repelled, but Pietro Orseolo was damaged by a torpedo from the American submarine Shad, before reaching safety in the Gironde estuary on 2 April. On 9 April, Z32 provided cover for the Himalaya during her breakout attempt, but they were foiled once again by British air attacks. The Z32's other operations included covering German U-boats departing from and returning to their French bases.

On 24 December 1943, the 8th Destroyer Flotilla, consisting of six destroyers including Z32, and the 4th Torpedo Boat Flotilla, comprising six torpedo boats, set out to meet the blockade runner Osorno, meeting her on 25 December. They managed to escort Osorno to the Gironde despite heavy air attacks, but Orsono struck a submerged wreck and had to be beached to save her cargo. On 26 December, the 8th Destroyer Flotilla (again including Z32) and the 4th Torpedo Boat Flotilla set out again to meet another inbound blockade runner, Alsterufer. Unknown to the Germans, Alsterufer was attacked on 27 December by a B-24 Liberator bomber of No. 311 (Czechoslovak) Squadron RAF, set on fire and abandoned by her crew. At about midday on 28 December, the British cruisers Glasgow and Enterprise, on patrol in the Bay of Biscay to intercept blockade runners, encountered the German destroyers and torpedo boats, resulting in the Battle of the Bay of Biscay. The German forces attempted a pincer manoeuvre, but this was prevented by the heavy seas. The destroyer Z27 and the torpedo boats T25 and T27 were sunk. Z33 fired six torpedoes at the British cruisers, all of which missed.

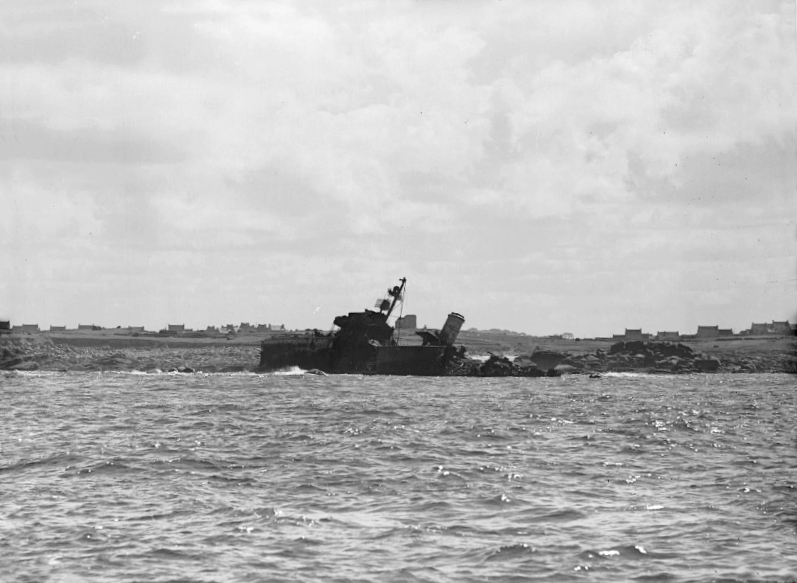
Wreck of Z32 on the Île de Batz

On 30 January 1944, as Z32 was carrying out exercises with Z23 and Z37 in the south of the Bay of Biscay, she collided with Z37. Z32 sustained damage to her degaussing system and suffered a fire on her forecastle, caused by loose ready-use anti-aircraft ammunition. Meanwhile, one of Z37's torpedoes exploded, starting a fire and causing flooding. Z32 was under repair until 2 May. Z37 considered to be beyond economical repair, and was disarmed. Z32 was damaged again on 5 May after running aground, and underwent repairs for another month.

On 6 June 1944, following the Normandy landings, the 8th Destroyer Flotilla, consisting of the destroyers Z32, Z24, ZH1 and the torpedo boat T24, set off for Brest for operations against the invasion fleet. They were attacked by British aircraft during their journey, with Z32 damaged by British rockets. On 8 and 9 June, the four ships set out from Brest for Cherbourg, but were intercepted by eight Allied destroyers in the Battle of Ushant. ZH1 was sunk by torpedoes from the British destroyer Ashanti, while Z32 was pursued by the Canadian destroyers Haida and Huron. She ran aground and was wrecked on the Île de Batz. The other two German ships escaped back to Cherbourg, while the British destroyer Tartar was damaged.

== Bibliography ==
- Gröner, Erich (1983). Die deutschen Kriegsschiffe 1815–1945: Band 2: Torpedoboote, Zerstörer, Schnelleboote, Minensuchboote, Minenräumboote [German Warships of 1815–1945: Volume 2: Torpedo boats, Destroyers, Speedboats, and Minesweepers] (in German). Koblenz, Germany: Bernard & Graefe Verlag. ISBN 3-7637-4801-6.
- Koop, Gerhard & Schmolke, Klaus-Peter (2014). German Destroyers of World War II. Barnsley, UK: Seaforth Publishing. ISBN 978-1-84832-193-9.
- Lenton, H. T. (1975). German Warships of the Second World War. London: Macdonald and Jane's. ISBN 0356-04661-3.
- Rohwer, Jürgen & Hümmelchen, Gerhard (1992). Chronology of the War at Sea 1939–1945. London: Greenhill Books. ISBN 1-85367-117-7.
- Rohwer, Jürgen (2005). Chronology of the War at Sea 1939–1945: The Naval History of World War Two (3rd rev. ed.). Annapolis: Naval Institute Press. ISBN 978-1-59114-119-8.
- Sieche, Erwin (1980). "Germany". In Chesneau, Roger (ed.). Conway's All the World's Fighting Ships 1922–1946. London: Conway Maritime Press. pp. 218–254. ISBN 0-85177-146-7.
- Whitley, M. J. (2000). Destroyers of World War Two: An International Encyclopedia. London: Cassell & Co. ISBN 1-85409-521-8.
