= Type 1936A destroyer =

Class of German warships

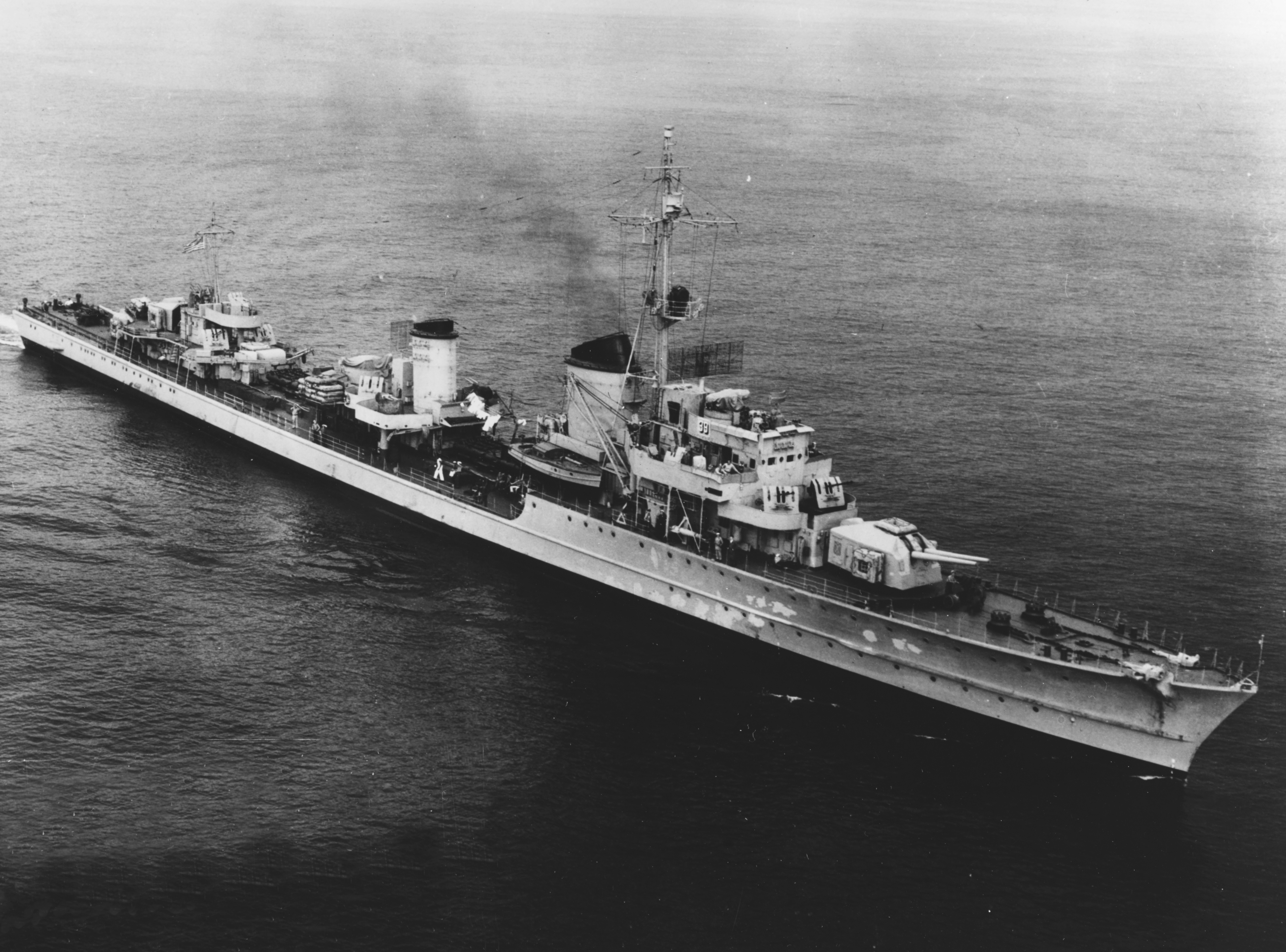
- Z39 in September 1945

Class overview
- Operators: Kriegsmarine; French Navy; Soviet Navy; Royal Navy; United States Navy
- Preceded by: Type 1936 destroyer
- Succeeded by: Type 1936B destroyer
- Subclasses: Type 1936A, Type 1936A (Mob)
- Built: 1938–1943
- In commission: 1940–1958
- Completed: 15
- Lost: 7
- Retired: 8

General characteristics (as built)
- Type: Destroyer
- Displacement: 2,543–2,657 long tons (2,584–2,700 t) (standard)
- Length: 127 m (416 ft 8 in) (o/a)
- Beam: 12 m (39 ft 4 in)
- Draught: 4.38–4.65 m (14 ft 4 in – 15 ft 3 in)
- Installed power: 6 × water-tube boilers; 70,000 PS (51,000 kW; 69,000 shp)
- Propulsion: 2 × shafts; 2 × geared steam turbine sets
- Speed: 36 knots (67 km/h; 41 mph)
- Range: 2,600 nmi (4,800 km; 3,000 mi) at 19 knots (35 km/h; 22 mph)
- Complement: 321–335
- Armament: 4 × single or 1 × twin and 3 × single 15 cm (5.9 in) guns; 2 × twin 3.7 cm (1.5 in) AA guns; 5–10 × 2 cm (0.79 in) AA guns; 2 × quadruple 53.3 cm (21 in) torpedo tubes; 4 × depth charge throwers; 60 × mines

The Type 1936A destroyers, also known as the Z23 class, were a group of fifteen destroyers built for the Nazi Germany's Kriegsmarine from 1938 to 1943. They were known to the Allies as the Narvik class. In common with other German destroyers launched after the start of World War II, the Narviks were unnamed, known only by their hull numbers – Z23 to Z39.

== Design ==
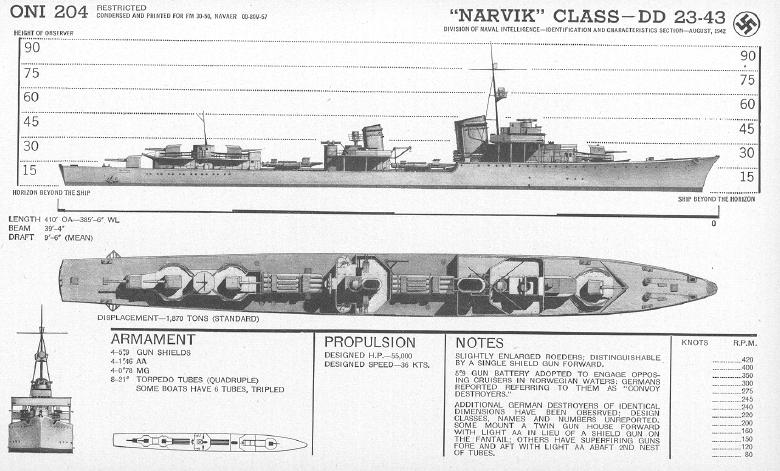
American ship recognition drawing

In terms of armament, they were closer to light cruisers than the typical destroyer. The use of 15 cm (5.9 in) guns was atypical of destroyers which tended to have guns around 120–127 mm (4.7–5.0 in) in calibre. They were intended to carry two forward guns in a twin turret, but as the twin turrets were not ready in time, early class 1936As carried a single mounted gun forward.

Despite being powerful the ships were not without their flaws. There were problems with the reliability of the high pressure steam engines and seakeeping in rough seas due to the newly designed bow and heavy forward artillery.

The eight ships of the Type 1936A design (Z23 to Z30) were all laid down between 1938 and 1940. The seven destroyers numbered from Z31 to Z39 were classed as Zerstörer 1936A (Mob); they were laid down in 1940 and 1941 and were slightly larger and had some internal modifications (including engines that caused less trouble than with their predecessors) from the original design to shorten construction times.

== Description ==
The ships had an overall length of 127 metres (416 ft 8 in) and were 121.9 metres (399 ft 11 in) long at the waterline. They had a beam of 12 metres (39 ft 4 in), and a maximum draught of 4.38–4.65 metres (14 ft 4 in – 15 ft 3 in). They displaced 2,543–2,657 long tons (2,584–2,700 t) at standard load and 3,519–3,691 long tons (3,575–3,750 t) at deep load. The ship's hulls were divided into 16 watertight compartments and they were fitted with a double bottom that covered 47% of their length amidships. Their crew consisted of 11–15 officers and 305–20 sailors; when serving as a flagship an additional 4 officers and 19 sailors were assigned.

The Type 1936As were powered by two Wagner geared steam turbine sets, each driving a single three-bladed 3.2–3.35-metre (10 ft 6 in – 11 ft 0 in) propeller, using steam provided by six high-pressure Wagner water-tube boilers with superheaters that operated at a pressure of 70 atm (7,093 kPa; 1,029 psi) and a temperature of 450–480 °C (842–896 °F). The turbines were designed to produce 70,000 metric horsepower (51,000 kW; 69,000 shp) for a speed of 36 knots (67 km/h; 41 mph). The ships carried a maximum of 835 tonnes (822 long tons) of fuel oil which gave a range of 2,600 nautical miles (4,800 km; 3,000 mi) at 19 knots (35 km/h; 22 mph).

=== Armament and sensors ===
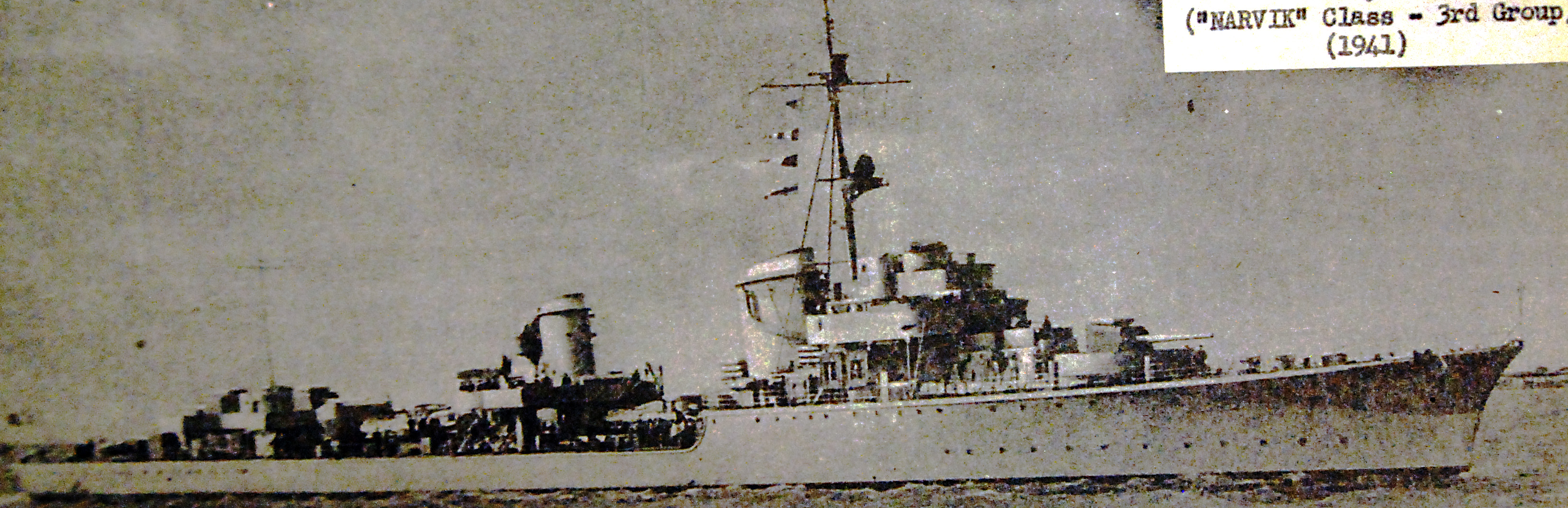
Narvik-class destroyer, starboard view, 1941

The main armament of the Type 1936A ships was intended to be five 45-calibre 15-centimetre (5.9 in) TbtsK C/36 guns in a twin-gun turret forward and the three other guns in single mounts with gun shields aft of the main superstructure, but delivery of the turrets was delayed and all of the Type 36A class was delivered with four single 15 cm guns with one gun forward and three aft. Z28 was the sole exception as its armament was arranged with two single mounts fore and aft. Z23, Z24, Z25 and Z29 were later fitted with the turret. All of the Type 36A (Mob) ships except Z31 were built with the turret and that ship received one later. The single mounts had a range of elevation from −10° to +30° while the guns in the turret could be elevated to 65°. The TbtsK C/36 gun fired 45.3-kilogram (100 lb) projectiles at a muzzle velocity of 835 m/s (2,740 ft/s) which gave them a maximum range of 21,950 metres (24,000 yd). The hand-loaded gun had a maximum rate of fire of 7–8 rounds per minute and the ships carried a total of 480 shells for them.

Their anti-aircraft armament consisted of four 80-calibre 3.7-centimetre (1.5 in) SK C/30 guns in two twin mounts abreast the aft funnel. The power operated mounts had a maximum elevation of 85° which gave the guns a ceiling of 6,800 metres (22,300 ft); horizontal range was 8,500 metres (9,300 yd) at an elevation of 37.5°. The single-shot SK C/30 fired 0.748-kilogram (1.65 lb) projectiles at a muzzle velocity of 1,000 m/s (3,300 ft/s) at a rate of 30 rounds per minute. The mounts were stabilized, but their gyroscopes were undersized and could not cope with sharp turns or heavy rolling. They were also fitted with five to ten fully automatic 65-calibre 2-centimetre (0.8 in) C/30 guns in quadruple and single mounts. The gun had an effective rate of fire of about 120 rounds per minute. Its 0.134-kilogram (0.30 lb) projectiles were fired at a muzzle velocity of 835 m/s (2,740 ft/s) which gave it a ceiling of 3,700 metres (12,100 ft) and a maximum horizontal range of 4,800 metres (5,200 yd).

The ships carried eight above-water 53.3-centimetre (21 in) torpedo tubes in two power-operated mounts. Two reloads were provided for each mount. The standard torpedo for the Type 36B destroyers was the G7a torpedo. It had a 300-kilogram (660 lb) warhead and three speed range settings: 14,000 metres (15,000 yd) at 30 knots (56 km/h; 35 mph); 8,000 metres (8,700 yd) at 40 knots (74 km/h; 46 mph) and 6,000 metres (6,600 yd) at 44 knots (81 km/h; 51 mph). They had four depth charge launchers and mine rails could be fitted on the rear deck that had a maximum capacity of 60 mines. 'GHG' (Gruppenhorchgerät) passive hydrophones were fitted to detect submarines and a S-Gerät sonar was also probably fitted. The ships were equipped with a FuMO 24/25 radar set above the bridge.

== Ships ==
The class, including the 36A (Mob), consisted of 15 ships. All were built in Bremen by AG Weser shipyard (part of Deutsche Schiff- und Maschinenbau AG/Deschimag) apart from Z37, Z38 and Z39 which were built by Germania (Kiel).

=== 1936A ===
List of Type 1936A destroyers
Ship	Laid down	Commissioned	Fate
Z23	15 November 1938	15 September 1940	Badly damaged by bomb hit on 12 August 1944 and decommissioned on 21 August. Taken by France after the war and renamed Leopard. Scrapped in 1951.
Z24	2 January 1939	26 October 1940	Sunk on 25 August 1944 near Le Verdon by British bombers.
Z25	15 February 1939	30 November 1940	Taken by France after the war and renamed Hoche. Scrapped in 1958.
Z26	1 April 1939	11 January 1941	Sunk in battle by the British cruiser Trinidad and destroyer Eclipse on 29 March 1942 in the Barents Sea while attacking Convoy PQ 13.
Z27	27 December 1939	26 February 1941	Sunk in battle with British light cruisers Glasgow and Enterprise on 28 December 1943 in the Bay of Biscay.
Z28	30 October 1939	9 August 1941	Sunk by British bombers on 3 March 1945 near Saßnitz in the Baltic Sea.
Z29	21 March 1940	25 June 1941	Taken by Britain after the war and given to the United States. Scuttled because of her poor condition by US Navy on 16 December 1946 near Jutland.
Z30	15 April 1940	15 November 1941	Taken by Norway after the war and given to Britain. Used as target ship and scrapped in 1949.

=== 1936A (Mob) ===
List of Type 1936A (Mob) destroyers
Ship	Laid down	Commissioned	Fate
Z31	1 September 1940	11 April 1942	Taken by France after the war and renamed Marceau. Scrapped in 1958.
Z32	1 November 1940	15 September 1942	Damaged in battle with Canadian destroyers Haida and Huron on 9 June 1944 during the Battle of Ushant and beached. Later destroyed by air attacks.
Z33	22 December 1940	6 February 1943	Taken by Soviet Union after the war and renamed Provorniy (Проворный). Sunk as target ship in 1961.
Z34	15 January 1941	5 June 1943	Taken by US after the war. Scuttled because of her poor condition by US Navy on 26 March 1946 near Jutland.
Z37	1940	16 July 1942	Collided with destroyer Z32 on 1 January 1944 and badly damaged. Decommissioned on 24 August and scuttled the same day in Bordeaux. Scrapped in 1949
Z38	1940	20 March 1943	Taken by Britain after the war and renamed Nonsuch. Used for testing effects of underwater explosions, contrary to expectations it broke in half during the first test and was scrapped between 1949 and 1950.
Z39	1940	21 August 1943	Taken by Britain after the war and given to US. Renamed DD-939 and used for testing. Given to France in 1947 and used as spare part supply for other German vessels in service. Scrapped in 1964.

== Notes ==
=== Bibliography ===
- Brown, David K. (2000). Nelson to Vanguard: Warship Design and Development, 1923–1945. London: Chatham. ISBN 9781861761361.
- Campbell, John (1985). Naval Weapons of World War II. Annapolis, Maryland: Naval Institute Press. ISBN 0-87021-459-4.
- Gröner, Erich (1990). German Warships 1815–1945. Vol. 1: Major Surface Warships. Annapolis, Maryland: Naval Institute Press. ISBN 0-87021-790-9.
- Koop, Gerhard & Schmolke, Klaus-Peter (2003). German Destroyers of World War II. Annapolis, Maryland: Naval Institute Press. ISBN 1-59114-307-1.
- Whitley, M. J. (1991). German Destroyers of World War Two. Annapolis, Maryland: Naval Institute Press. ISBN 978-1-55750-302-2.

=== Further reading ===
- Rohwer, Jürgen (2005). Chronology of the War at Sea 1939–1945: The Naval History of World War Two (Third Revised ed.). Annapolis, Maryland: Naval Institute Press. ISBN 1-59114-119-2.
- Sieche, Erwin (1980). "Germany". In Chesneau, Roger (ed.). Conway's All the World's Fighting Ships 1922–1946. London: Conway Maritime Press. pp. 218–254. ISBN 0-85177-146-7.
