= German destroyer Z24 =

German World War II destroyer

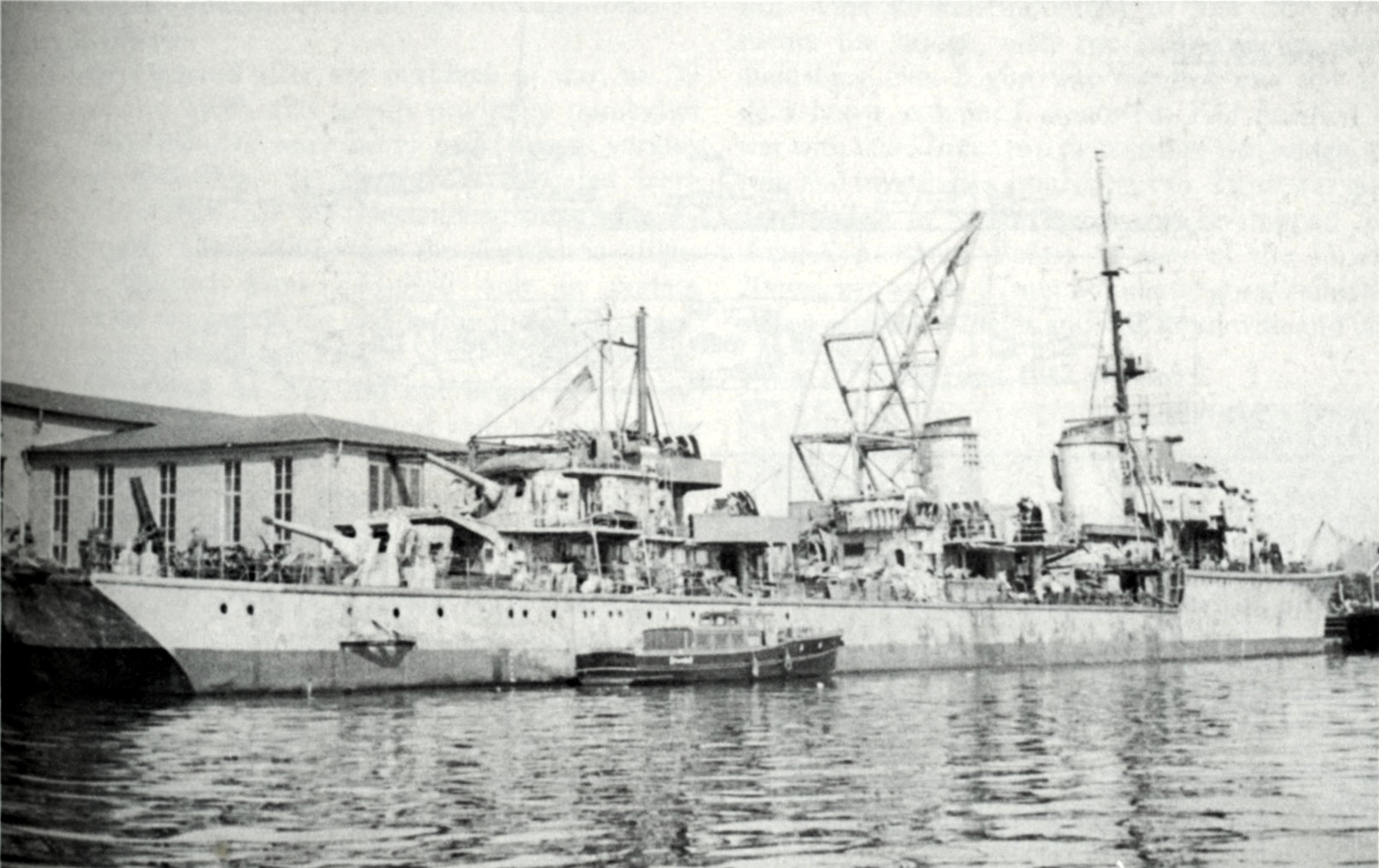
- Sister ship Z29, 1945

History

Nazi Germany
- Name: Z24
- Ordered: 23 April 1938
- Builder: AG Weser (Deschimag), Bremen
- Yard number: W958
- Laid down: 2 January 1939
- Launched: 7 March 1940
- Completed: 23 October 1940
- Fate: Sunk by air attack, 25 August 1944

General characteristics (as built)
- Class & type: Type 1936A destroyer
- Displacement: 2,603 long tons (2,645 t) (standard); 3,605 long tons (3,663 t) (deep load)
- Length: 127 m (416 ft 8 in) (o/a)
- Beam: 12 m (39 ft 4 in)
- Draft: 4.65 m (15 ft 3 in)
- Installed power: 6 × water-tube boilers; 70,000 PS (51,000 kW; 69,000 shp)
- Propulsion: 2 × shafts; 2 × geared steam turbine sets
- Speed: 36 knots (67 km/h; 41 mph)
- Range: 2,500 nmi (4,600 km; 2,900 mi) at 19 knots (35 km/h; 22 mph)
- Complement: 332
- Armament: 4 × single 15 cm (5.9 in) guns; 2 × twin 3.7 cm (1.5 in) anti-aircraft guns; 5 × single 2 cm (0.8 in) AA guns; 2 × quadruple 53.3 cm (21 in) torpedo tubes; 4 × depth charge launchers; 60 mines

Service record
- Commanders: Martin Saltzwedel; Carl-Heinz Birnbacher

Z24 was one of fifteen Type 1936A destroyers built for the Kriegsmarine (German Navy) during World War II. Completed in 1940, the ship spent the first half of the war in Norwegian waters. She was very active in attacking the Arctic convoys ferrying war materials to the Soviet Union in 1941–1942, but only helped to sink one Allied ship herself.

After being rearmed in late 1942, Z24 was transferred to France, where she spent 1943 escorting Axis blockade runners through the Bay of Biscay and played a minor role in the Battle of the Bay of Biscay at the end of the year. After the Allied landings in Normandy on 6 June 1944, she was one of the few remaining destroyers in French waters and was badly damaged during the Battle of Ushant several days later. After repairs had been completed in early August, the ship was damaged by Allied fighter-bombers in mid-August. Another attack later in the month by fighter-bombers sank Z24.

== Design and description ==
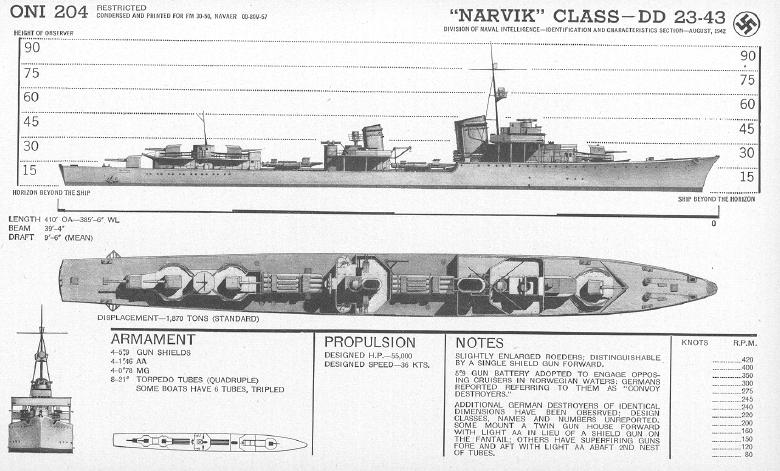
Wartime Allied recognition manual drawing of the Type 36A destroyer

The Type 1936A destroyers were slightly larger than the preceding Type 1936 class and had a heavier armament. They had an overall length of 127 meters (416 ft 8 in) and were 121.90 meters (399 ft 11 in) long at the waterline. The ships had a beam of 12 meters (39 ft 4 in), and a maximum draft of 4.62 meters (15 ft 2 in). They displaced 2,603 long tons (2,645 t) at standard load and 3,605 long tons (3,663 t) at deep load. The two Wagner geared steam turbine sets, each driving one propeller shaft, were designed to produce 70,000 PS (51,000 kW; 69,000 shp) using steam provided by six Wagner water-tube boilers for a designed speed of 36 knots (67 km/h; 41 mph). Z24 carried a maximum of 791 metric tons (779 long tons) of fuel oil which gave a range of 2,500 nautical miles (4,600 km; 2,900 mi) at 19 knots (35 km/h; 22 mph). Her crew consisted of 11 officers and 321 sailors.

The ship carried four 15-centimeter (5.9 in) TbtsK C/36 guns in single mounts with gun shields, one forward of the superstructure and three aft. Her anti-aircraft armament consisted of four 3.7-centimeter (1.5 in) C/30 guns in two twin mounts abreast the rear funnel and five 2-centimeter (0.8 in) C/30 guns in single mounts. Z24 carried eight above-water 53.3-centimeter (21 in) torpedo tubes in two power-operated mounts. Two reloads were provided for each mount. She had four depth charge launchers and mine rails could be fitted on the rear deck that had a maximum capacity of 60 mines. 'GHG' (Gruppenhorchgerät) passive hydrophones were fitted to detect submarines and an S-Gerät sonar was also probably fitted. The ship was equipped with a FuMO 21 radar set above the bridge.

=== Modifications ===
Z24's single forward 15 cm gun was exchanged for a 15 cm LC/38 twin-gun turret during her late-1942 refit. This exacerbated the Type 36A's tendency to take water over the bow and reduced their speed to 32.8 knots (60.7 km/h; 37.7 mph). Around the same time Z24 received a pair of quadruple 2 cm mounts and three more single 2 cm guns to give her a total of sixteen 2 cm guns. A FuMB 1 Metox radar detector was added later. When the ship docked in Brest, France, in June 1944, a pair of quadruple 2 cm mounts replaced single guns that had been mounted amidships.

== Service history ==
Z24 was ordered from AG Weser (Deschimag) on 23 April 1938. The ship was laid down at Deschimag's Bremen shipyard as yard number W958 on 2 January 1939, launched on 7 March 1940, and commissioned on 23 October. After working up, she began escorting ships between the Baltic and Norway in March 1941. On 12–13 June Z24 was one of the escorts for the heavy cruiser Lützow as the latter ship attempted to break out into the Atlantic. Several Bristol Beaufort aircraft spotted Lützow and her escorts off the Norwegian coast and one managed to surprise them and torpedo the cruiser early on the morning of 13 June, forcing her to return to Germany for repairs. Z24 was transferred to Brest on the 16th, together with her sister Z23, and they helped to escort the battleship Scharnhorst through the Bay of Biscay on 20–24 July and covered the passage of the merchant raider Orion through the bay on 21–28 August. They were ordered to northern Norway on 23 October.

At the end of November the sisters reached Tromsø and was assigned to the 8. Zerstörerflottile (8th Destroyer Flotilla). On 17 December, Z24, along with her sisters Z23, Z25, and Z27, sortied into the Barents Sea on 16 December 1941, searching for Allied ships off the coast of the Kola Peninsula. The following day, Z25's radar spotted two ships in heavy fog at a range of 37.5 kilometers (23.3 mi). The Germans thought that they were Soviet destroyers, but they were actually two British minesweepers, Hazard and Speedy, sailing to rendezvous with Convoy QP 6. The Germans intercepted them, but the heavy fog and icing precluded accurate gunfire. The British ships were able to escape despite four hits on Speedy and the heavy expenditure of ammunition. On 13 January 1942, Z25 escorted Z23 and Z24 as they laid a minefield in the western channel of the White Sea. A week later, Z23 accidentally rammed Z24 in heavy fog on 20 January, forcing the latter to return to Wesermünde for repairs.

=== Anti-convoy operations ===
After they were completed, the ship escorted the heavy cruiser Admiral Hipper to Norway on 18 March. Ten days later, Z24 and her sisters Z25 and Z26 departed the Varangerfjord in an attempt to intercept Convoy PQ 13. Later that night they rescued 61 survivors of the sunken freighter SS Empire Ranger then sank the straggling 4,687-gross register ton (GRT) freighter SS Bateau. They rescued 7 survivors before resuming the search for the convoy. The light cruiser HMS Trinidad, escorted by the destroyer HMS Fury, spotted the German ships with her radar at 08:49 on the 29th and was spotted herself around the same time. Both sides opened fire at the point-blank range of 3,200 yards (2,900 m) in a snowstorm. Trinidad engaged the leading German destroyer, Z26, badly damaging her, and then switched to Z25 without making any hits. Between them the destroyers fired 19 torpedoes at the cruiser, all of which missed after Trinidad turned away, and hit her twice with their 15 cm guns, inflicting only minor damage. The British ships maneuvered to avoid torpedoes, which forced them to disengage, and Z26 accidentally became separated from her sisters. Trinidad and Fury pursued Z26 and further damaged her before Trinidad was crippled by one of her own torpedoes.

The destroyer HMS Eclipse took up the pursuit after Fury turned away to render assistance to the cruiser. After the sixth hit made by the British destroyer, Z26 lost power at 10:20 and was listing to port with her stern awash. Eclipse was maneuvering to give the German destroyer the coup de grâce with a torpedo when the snowstorm ended and visibility increased, revealing Z24 and Z25 approaching. They promptly opened fire at Eclipse, hitting her twice and wounding nine men, before she could find cover in a squall at 10:35. The German ships did not purse Eclipse, preferring to heave to and take off 88 survivors from Z26.

The two destroyers, now reinforced by Z7 Hermann Schoemann and assigned to Zerstörergruppe Arktis (Destroyer Group Arctic), commanded by Kapitän zur See (Captain) Alfred Schulze-Hinrichs, searched unsuccessfully for Convoys PQ 14 and QP 10 on 11 April. On 30 April the German submarine U-456 torpedoed and crippled the light cruiser Edinburgh, part of the close escort for Convoy QP 11. Later that day, the trio of destroyers were ordered to intercept her. The following afternoon they encountered the main body of the convoy and attacked in limited visibility. Over the next four hours, they made five attempts to close with the convoy, but the four escorting British destroyers were able to keep themselves between the Germans and the convoy. After being rebuffed, Schulze-Hinrichs decided to break off the attack and search for his original objective. The German ships were only able to sink the 2,847 GRT freighter, SS Tsiolkovsky, with torpedoes from Z24 and Z25, and badly damage the escort destroyer Amazon with gunfire. The British ships did not make any hits on the German destroyers.

Later that day, Edinburgh's original escort of two destroyers was augmented by four British minesweepers and a small Russian tugboat. The cruiser was steaming under her own power at a speed of about 3 knots (5.6 km/h; 3.5 mph) by the morning of 2 May with steering provided by the tugboat. She was spotted by the Germans and Z7 Hermann Schoemann exchanged fire with the minesweeper Harrier at about 06:27. Edinburgh then cast off her tow and increased speed to her maximum of about 8 knots (15 km/h; 9.2 mph), steering in a circle. Z7 Hermann Schoemann maneuvered at 21 knots (39 km/h; 24 mph) to obtain a good position from which to fire torpedoes once the range closed to 2,800 meters (3,100 yd). At 06:36, the cruiser opened fire, with the first salvo only missing by about 100 meters (110 yd). The destroyer immediately turned away, increased speed to 31 knots (57 km/h; 36 mph), and started making smoke, but to no avail as the second salvo set her on fire and severed the main steam line, which disabled the engines. Z25 initially engaged the destroyer Forester, hitting her three times at about 06:50, which disabled two guns and knocked out her power with a hit in her forward boiler room. Her sister Foresight passed in front of Forester a few minutes later to draw the attention of Z24 and Z25, which succeeded all too well as she was hit four times by 07:24, disabling the engines and leaving her with only a single gun operable. In the meantime, the cruiser had been hit once more by a torpedo at 07:02, although it only knocked out her engines and gave her a list to port. Rather than sink any of the three disabled British ships or the lightly armed minesweepers, Z24 and Z25 concentrated on rescuing the crew of the drifting Z7 Hermann Schoemann despite occasional British shells. The former made multiple attempts to come alongside to take off about 210 survivors while the latter laid a smoke screen. Z7 Hermann Schoemann was then scuttled using her own depth charges. Z24 was unscathed during the battle, but Z25 was hit once.

The ship took part in the preliminaries of Operation Rösselsprung, an attempt to intercept Convoy PQ 17 in early July. Lützow and her sister Admiral Scheer formed one group in Narvik with Z24 and four of her sisters while Admiral Hipper and the battleship Tirpitz composed another. While en route to the rendezvous at the Altafjord, Lützow and three destroyers of Tirpitz's escort ran aground, forcing the entire group to abandon the operation. On 12 July Z24 escorted one of the damaged destroyers to Kiel and then began a lengthy refit at Wesermünde that lasted until January 1943.

=== Operations in France ===
On 5 March 1943, the 8. Zerstörerflottile (Z23, Z24, Z32 and Z37) was transferred via the English Channel to the French Atlantic coast in Operation Karin. Despite attacks by British coastal artillery and motor torpedo boats, the flotilla managed to pass through the Straits of Dover unscathed, but Z37 ran aground at Le Havre en route. The flotilla provided distant cover for an attempt by the Italian blockade runner Himalaya to sail for the Far East on 28 March, but the ship had to return to Bordeaux after it was spotted by a British reconnaissance aircraft. Two days later, the flotilla escorted the Italian blockade runner Pietro Orseolo through the Bay of Biscay despite the ship being torpedoed by an American submarine and under heavy attack by Bristol Beaufighter fighter-bombers and Beaufort torpedo bombers; the German destroyers shot down five of the attacking aircraft. Himalaya made another attempt to break out on 9 April, but the ships were spotted by a Short Sunderland flying boat. After reversing course, they were attacked by Vickers Wellington bombers and Handley Page Hampden torpedo bombers. Five of the attackers were shot down. On 14 June Z24 and Z32 sortied into the Bay of Biscay to take off the survivors of the sunken German submarine U-564 which had been rescued by U-185. The flotilla escorted submarines through the bay for the rest of the summer. On 24–26 December, the ship was one of the escorts for the 6,951 GRT blockade runner MV Osorno through the Bay of Biscay.

Another blockade runner, the 2,729 GRT refrigerated cargo ship MV Alsterufer, trailed Osorno by several days and four destroyers, including Z24, of the 8. Flotille and six torpedo boats of the 4. Torpedobootflotille (4th Torpedo Boat Flotilla) set sail on 27 December to escort her through the bay. The Allies were aware of these blockade runners through their Ultra code-breaking efforts and positioned cruisers and aircraft in the Western Atlantic to intercept them in Operation Stonewall. A Consolidated B-24 Liberator heavy bomber from No. 311 Squadron RAF sank Alsterufer later that afternoon. At about midday on 28 December, the British cruisers Glasgow and Enterprise, on patrol in the Bay of Biscay to intercept blockade runners, intercepted the German destroyers and torpedo boats, resulting in the Battle of the Bay of Biscay. Heavy seas prevented the German force from using its theoretical advantage in speed and firepower, with the destroyer Z27 and the torpedo boats T25 and T27 sunk. Z24 was neither engaged by the British cruisers nor fired its weapons and suffered engine problems during the battle.

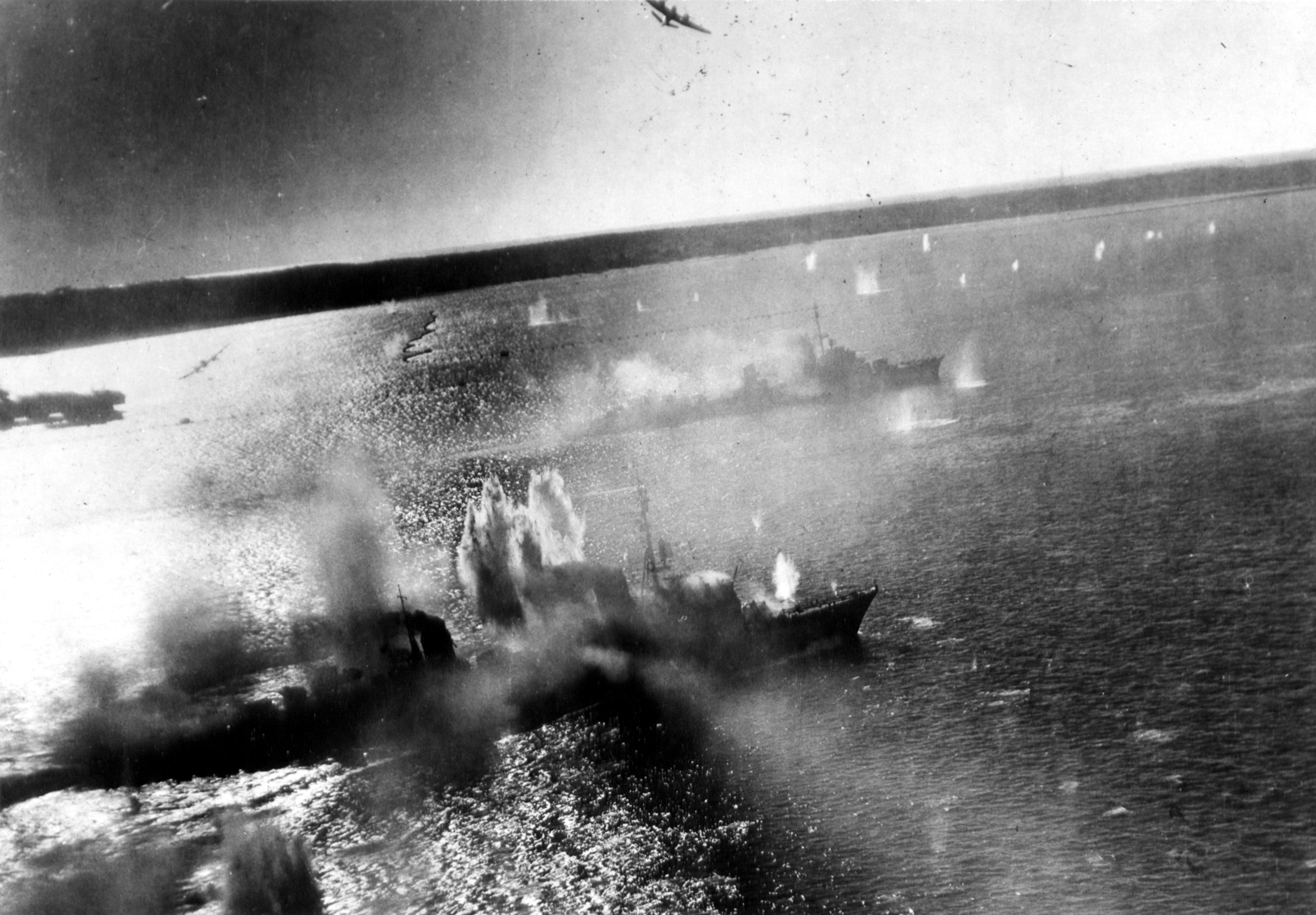
Z24 and torpedo boat T24 under attack by Bristol Beaufighters from No. 236 Squadron RAF and No. 404 Squadron RCAF, 24 August 1944

The ship began a refit at La Pallice on 14 January 1944 that was completed in early May. After word of the Allied landings at Normandy on 6 June was received by Kapitan zur See Theodor von Bechtolsheim, commander of the 8. Zerstörerflottile, ordered his three remaining destroyers, Z24, Z32, ZH1, and the torpedo boat T24, to sail for Brest to begin operations against the invasion fleet. They were attacked by Beaufighters during their journey, with Z32 damaged by a pair of rockets and one aircraft forced to ditch. Once they reached Brest, Z24 and Z32 had their anti-aircraft suites reinforced. On the night of 8/9 June, the four ships set out from Brest for Cherbourg, but were intercepted by eight Allied destroyers of the 10th Destroyer Flotilla in the Battle of Ushant. The German ships had been spotted first and the British opened fire first, with the Germans responding with a four-torpedo salvo from each destroyer that missed when the Allied ships turned to evade them. Their fire was extremely effective with Z24 badly damaged only moments after firing her first salvo. The range was so close that both sides engaged with their 40 mm (1.6 in) or 37 mm anti-aircraft guns which appreciably added to the damaged suffered by Z24. The Allied ships hit the German destroyer with five 4.7 in (120 mm) shells before she was able to lay smoke and disengage. The first shell struck the 15 cm loading room for the turret, severing all communication with the turret, while another shell devastated the forward superstructure, killing 13 men, and set the radio room on fire. Other shells hit the forward engine room, set the aft funnel and some ready-use ammunition on fire and destroyed one of the amidships quadruple 2 cm gun mounts. Two Canadian destroyers pursued Z24 and T24 until the German ships passed over a minefield and they reached Brest later in that evening.

The ship was under repair at Bordeaux from 13 July to 5 August, but was attacked by Allied fighter-bombers on the 14th off Royan. She was struck by five rockets and ninety 20 mm shells that damaged her superstructure and gun turret. Z24 returned to Bordeaux for repairs, but was attacked by rocket-carrying Beaufighters off Le Verdon-sur-Mer on 24 August. The ship was struck three times with one dead and another wounded from the attack. She managed to come alongside a quay the next day, but later capsized and sank. Her crew was incorporated into the defender of Festung Gironde (Fortress Gironde) that held out until the surrender of Germany in May 1945.
