= German destroyer ZH1 =

Watercraft

- ZH1 at a mooring buoy, 1942–1943

History

Nazi Germany
- Name: ZH1
- Builder: Rotterdamsche Droogdok Maatschappij, Rotterdam, Netherlands
- Laid down: 12 October 1938
- Launched: 12 October 1939
- Acquired: 15 May 1940
- Commissioned: 11 October 1942
- Fate: Scuttled, 9 June 1944

General characteristics (as built)
- Class & type: Gerard Callenburgh-class destroyer
- Displacement: 1,604 long tons (1,630 t) (standard); 2,228 long tons (2,264 t) (deep load)
- Length: 106.7 m (350 ft 1 in) (o/a)
- Beam: 10.6 m (34 ft 9 in)
- Draught: 3.52 m (11 ft 7 in)
- Installed power: 45,000 shp (34,000 kW); 3 × Yarrow boilers
- Propulsion: 2 × shafts; 2 × geared steam turbine sets
- Speed: 36 knots (67 km/h; 41 mph)
- Range: 2,700 nmi (5,000 km; 3,100 mi) at 19 knots (35 km/h; 22 mph)
- Complement: 230
- Armament: 2 × twin, 1 × single 12 cm (4.7 in) guns; 2 × twin 3.7 cm (1.5 in) AA guns; 4 × single 2 cm (0.79 in) AA guns; 2 × quadruple 53.3 cm (21 in) torpedo tubes; 4 × depth charge throwers; 24 × mines

ZH1 was the lead ship of her class of four destroyers built for the Royal Netherlands Navy in the late 1930s. Originally named Gerard Callenburgh, the ship was scuttled while still incomplete by the Dutch during the German invasion of the Netherlands in May 1940, but she was salvaged by the Germans a few months later and commissioned in the Kriegsmarine (German Navy) in 1942 as ZH1.

After many delays, the ship was transferred to France in late 1943 where she escorted Axis blockade runners and submarines through the Bay of Biscay. After the Allied landings in Normandy on 6 June 1944, she was one of the few remaining destroyers in French waters and they were ordered to attack the invasion shipping off the beaches. During the Battle of Ushant several days later, ZH1 was crippled and scuttled to prevent her capture, most of her crew being rescued by the Allies.

== Design and description ==
The latest Japanese destroyers far outclassed the Royal Netherlands Navy's existing Admiralen-class destroyers when the Gerard Callenburgh-class destroyers were designed in the mid-1930s with assistance from the British company, Yarrow Shipbuilders. In response to the threat they were larger, faster and more heavily armed than the older ships. They did retain the floatplane carried by the Admiralen class for reconnaissance purposes.

ZH1 had an overall length of 106.7 metres (350 ft 1 in) and was 105.2 metres (345 ft 2 in) long at the waterline. The ship had a beam of 10.6 metres (34 ft 9 in), and a maximum draught of 3.52 metres (11 ft 7 in). She displaced 1,604 long tons (1,630 t) at standard load and 2,228 long tons (2,264 t) at deep load. The two geared steam turbine sets, each driving one propeller shaft, were designed to produce 45,000 shaft horsepower (34,000 kW) using steam provided by three water-tube boilers for a designed speed of 36 knots (67 km/h; 41 mph). ZH1 reached 37.5 knots (69.5 km/h; 43.2 mph) from 53,000 shp (40,000 kW) during her sea trials. The ship carried a maximum of 520 tonnes (512 long tons) of fuel oil which gave a range of 2,700 nautical miles (5,000 km; 3,100 mi) at 19 knots (35 km/h; 22 mph). Her crew consisted of 12 officers and 218 sailors.

The ship carried five Bofors 12-centimetre (4.7 in) QF Mk 8 guns in two twin-gun turrets, fore and aft of the superstructure and a single gun mount positioned on top of the rear deckhouse, superimposed over the rear turret. ZH1's anti-aircraft armament consisted of four 3.7-centimetre (1.5 in) SK C/30 guns in two twin mounts and four 2-centimetre (0.8 in) C/38 guns in single mounts. (Note: Whitley says that two quadruple 2 cm mounts were installed.) The ship carried eight above-water 53.3-centimetre (21 in) torpedo tubes in two power-operated mounts. She had four depth charge launchers and rails could be fitted on the rear deck that had a maximum capacity of 24 mines.

== Construction and career ==
The ship was laid down as Gerard Callenburgh on 12 October 1938 at the Rotterdamsche Droogdok Maatschappij (RDM) shipyard in Rotterdam and launched a year later. While she was still fitting out, Germany invaded the Netherlands on 10 May 1940 and the Royal Netherlands Navy decided to scuttle her to prevent her from falling into German hands five days later. The Germans, however, refloated the ship on 14 July and towed her to the Blohm & Voss shipyard in Hamburg for repair on 11 October, renaming her ZH1, standing for Zerstörer, [destroyer] Holland. The Kriegsmarine did not make many modifications as they wished to compare the ship to their own designs, retaining the main armament, propulsion machinery, and the gun and torpedo fire-control systems, despite the criticism of the latter systems. They did replace the original anti-aircraft armament of four 40-millimetre (1.6 in) Bofors guns and four 12.7-millimetre (0.5 in) anti-aircraft machineguns with German weapons. She was towed back to RDM for completion and was commissioned after many delays on 11 October 1942. ZH1 sailed for the Baltic Sea on the 25th to begin working up. The ship began a brief refit in Hamburg on 18 January 1943. She collided with the Danish cargo ship Douro on 11 April, but was only lightly damaged. While under repair in June, ZH1 was further damaged during air raids on the dockyard, delaying the completion of her repairs, and she was not deemed combat worthy until October. During this time she was fitted with a FuMO 24/25 radar set above the bridge.

On 31 October ZH1 and the destroyer Z27 departed Kiel for France. During the voyage to Le Verdon-sur-Mer, both ships were slightly damaged by splinters from British coastal artillery as they passed through the English Channel. On 5 November they were unsuccessfully attacked by British motor torpedo boats off Cap d'Antifer, damaging several of their assailants. Now assigned to the 8. Zerstörerflotille (8th Destroyer Flotilla), the ship was one of the escorts for the 6,951-gross register ton (GRT) blockade runner MV Osorno through the Bay of Biscay, but salinity problems in her condensers forced her turbines to be shut down on 26 December and she had to be towed to port by the torpedo boat T25. Repairs were not finished until March 1944. Early that month ZH1, the destroyer Z23, and the torpedo boats T27 and T29 escorted the Japanese submarine I-29 to Lorient. Later that month the ships escorted U-boats through the Bay of Biscay.

After word of the Allied landings at Normandy on 6 June was received by Kapitän zur See (Captain) Theodor von Bechtolsheim, commander of the 8. Zerstörerflottile, ordered his three remaining destroyers, ZH1, Z24, Z32, and the torpedo boat T24, to sail for Brest, France to begin operations against the invasion fleet. They were attacked by Beaufighters during their journey, with Z32 damaged by a pair of rockets and one aircraft forced to ditch. By this time, ZH1's armament had already been increased to four quadruple 2 cm mounts. On the night of 8/9 June, the four ships set out from Brest for Cherbourg, but were intercepted by eight Allied destroyers of the 10th Destroyer Flotilla in the Battle of Ushant. The German ships had been spotted first and the British opened fire first, with the Germans responding with a four-torpedo salvo from each destroyer that missed when the Allied ships turned to evade them. The British fire was extremely effective with ZH1 badly damaged by HMS Ashanti and HMS Tartar only moments after firing her first salvo. The most damaging hit was one that severed the main steam line in the engine room and another that flooded the forward boiler room, knocking out all power. The two British destroyers then shifted their fire to Z24 and lost track of ZH1 in the darkness. They later fired at Z32 which, in turn, engaged Tartar and set her aflame. Ashanti was preparing to turn to engage Z32 when ZH1 drifted into the area and fired at Tartar with her rear guns in manual mode. Ashanti then torpedoed ZH1, blowing off her bow; despite this, her forward turret continued to fire at the British ship. ZH1 also fired off her remaining torpedoes one at a time under manual control, missing with all four. Her situation hopeless, her captain ordered her crew to abandon ship and rigged depth charges to scuttle the ship at 48°52′N 4°28′W. Three officers and thirty-six crewmen were killed during the battle. One boat with a single officer and twenty-seven men reached the French coast and the British rescued one hundred and forty men.

== Bibliography ==
- Gröner, Erich (1990). German Warships 1815–1945. Vol. 1: Major Surface Warships. Annapolis, Maryland: Naval Institute Press. ISBN 0-87021-790-9.
- Koop, Gerhard & Schmolke, Klaus-Peter (2003). German Destroyers of World War II. Annapolis, Maryland: Naval Institute Press. ISBN 978-1-59114-307-9.
- Rohwer, Jürgen (2005). Chronology of the War at Sea 1939–1945: The Naval History of World War Two (Third Revised ed.). Annapolis, Maryland: Naval Institute Press. ISBN 1-59114-119-2.
- Sieche, Erwin (1980). "Germany". In Chesneau, Roger (ed.). Conway's All the World's Fighting Ships 1922–1946. London: Conway Maritime Press. ISBN 0-85177-146-7.
- Whitley, M. J. (2000). Destroyers of World War Two: An International Encyclopedia. London: Cassell & Co. ISBN 1-85409-521-8.
- Whitley, M. J. (1991). German Destroyers of World War Two. Annapolis, Maryland: Naval Institute Press. ISBN 1-55750-302-8.
