= Battle of the Bay of Biscay =

Naval battle during the Second World War

- Part of the Battle of the Atlantic of the Second World War
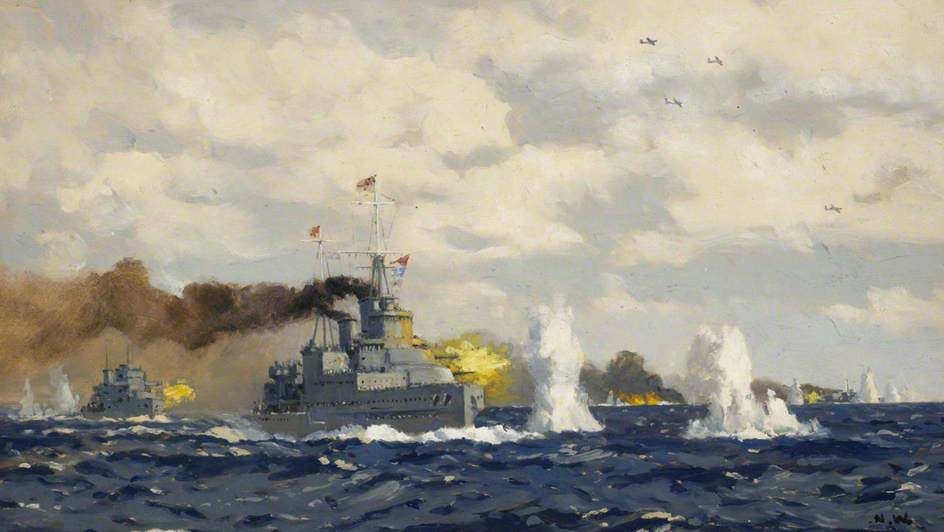
- The battle of the Bay of Biscay, 28 December 1943; Norman Wilkinson, c. 1944
Date	28 December 1943
Location	Bay of Biscay, Atlantic 45°N 12°W
Result	British victory

Belligerents
United Kingdom	Germany

Commanders and leaders
Charles Clark; Harold Grant	Franz Kohlauf; Hans Erdmenger †

Strength
2 light cruisers	5 destroyers; 6 torpedo boats; 1 aircraft

Casualties and losses
2 killed; 1 cruiser damaged	532 killed; 1 destroyer sunk; 2 torpedo boats sunk; 1 torpedo boat damaged

The Battle of the Bay of Biscay or Operation Bernau, was a naval action that took place on 28 December 1943 during the Second World War during the Atlantic campaign. The engagement took place between two light cruisers of the Royal Navy and a force of destroyers and torpedo boats of the Kriegsmarine that had sailed to rendezvous with a blockade-runner and escort it to port. The British operation was part of the Allied Operation Stonewall to intercept German blockade-runners off the west coast of France. In the confused action that followed the cruisers HMS Enterprise and HMS Glasgow sank the torpedo boats T26, T25 and the destroyer Z27.

== Background ==
=== Allied blockade of Germany ===
From the start of the war on 3 September 1939, the Allies proclaimed a blockade of Germany to prevent the import of goods. Germany had no rubber, oil, tin and tungsten. Until Operation Barbarossa the German invasion of the Soviet Union, it evaded the blockade via the Trans-Siberian Railway. After the supply route was closed at the start of Barbarossa and after the Japanese entry into the war, German and Italian ships were stranded in Japan and Japanese-occupied Singapore. The ships were used as blockade-runners, sailing to ports in occupied France after mid-1940, when Germany had taken control of the European coast from Norway to the French–Spanish border. From April 1941 to May 1942, 32 ships tried to reach France and 14 succeeded. In 1941 and 1942, German and Italian ships brought in 70,000 long tons (71,000 t) of commodities and exported 32,540 long tons (33,060 t) to Japan. From August 1942 to April 1943 fifteen ships tried to run the blockade and four got through.

=== Blockade-running ===
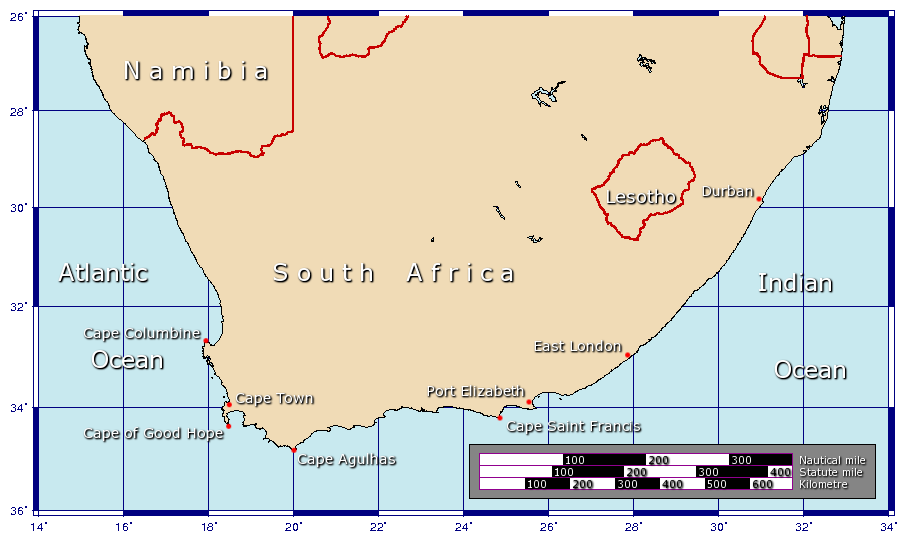
Map of the Cape of Good Hope in South Africa

After sailing from Japan, through the Pacific and the Indian Ocean to the Cape of Good Hope, blockade-runners kept radio silence and passed rearranging points at planned times. When a ship was due, U-boats and aircraft were barred from attacking merchant ships in a 200 nmi (370 km; 230 mi) lane in the mid-Atlantic, to the north-east from a line level with the Canary Islands, east of the Azores and then east to Bordeaux. Escorts were laid on through the Bay of Biscay and the ships received occasional support further out from U-boats. After the cargo has been discharged, the ship was re-fitted for the next journey.

More accommodation was built for crew and passengers, decks were reinforced, guns and ammunition stores were installed. A minimum of four scuttling charges of up to 165 lb (75 kg) were placed in the bottom of the hull and armed when the ship sailed with 7–9-minute fuzes; the crew kept their belongings ready in case they abandoned the ship. The vessel went into dry dock to have the hull cleaned to increase its speed and the ship underwent sea trials, sometimes incorporating the delivery of goods to Bassens or to another Biscay port. When ready to sail, the ship waited in the Gironde for an escort of minesweepers. Early in the war, the sailing schedule was little different from a peacetime commercial service.

=== Ultra ===
Locator map of the Azores

The defeat of the German U-boat offensive in the Battle of the Atlantic in 1943 was followed by the last attempt by the Germans to pass blockade-runners through the Bay of Biscay to and from the Japanese empire. From May 1943 decrypts of Japanese diplomatic wireless traffic revealed to the Allies that the losses of the 1942–1943 season had not deterred the Axis from making another attempt in the autumn. Seven merchant ships were to sail from Europe carrying 50,000 long tons (51,000 t) of exports and that the Germans were building special U-boats to import 3,000 long tons (3,000 t) of goods from Japan in 1943. In July and August, photographic reconnaissance and agent reports from the French Atlantic ports that sailings for the far East were being prepared and by 6 September it was clear that seven ships were close to sailing.

On 4 October, after the blockade-runner Kulmerland had been hit by Allied bombers, a signal from the Japanese Ambassador in Berlin showed the Allies that the export programme had been cut to 35,000 long tons (36,000 t) because of the bombing. On 18 July the British and Portuguese reached a basing agreement for the Azores, which came into force on 8 October and which had the potential to deter the Axis from trying to run the blockade. On 23 October, the Germans introduced new W/T methods for signalling between U-boats and blockade-runners in the Bay of Biscay and in early November Dresden, thought to be a blockade-runner, struck a mine. The British thought that five ships were preparing to leave the Bay and that four ships were preparing to return from the Far East. Later in November, another decrypt from the Japanese Ambassador revealed that the German export programme had been reduced again, to 29,000 long tons (29,000 t). US Navy patrols in the South Atlantic were increased.

== Prelude ==
=== 1943–1944 season ===
U-boats were used to transport small amounts of commodities in 1943 while bigger transport submarines were built but by winter German industry would need several shiploads of rubber and other cargoes. Despite the risks several ships would have to be despatched from Japan. There were five motor vessels in Japan and it was thought that if they left at fairly frequent intervals, the Allies might be distracted by the hunt for one and let another slip through their blockades. The ships would be on their own on the voyage but the run through the Bay of Biscay could be assisted by surface ships and aircraft. The five ships would carry 33,095 long tons (33,626 t) of rubber and other goods and sail at intervals that would allow the Biscay escort forces to meet one about 400 nmi (460 mi; 740 km) out from Bordeaux, escort it to port and then sail to meet the next one. The best time for the attempts to run the blockade would be midwinter 1943–1944. (Note: each ship would carry a man under arrest to Europe; one prisoner was alleged to have been a communist and member of the spy ring run by Richard Sorge. The Gestapo in Japan ordered that the men were to be left in confinement if ships were scuttled, to prevent them talking to the Allies. Admiral Paul Wenneker, the Naval Attaché in Tokyo, questioned the orders with Seekriegsleitung in Berlin and passed on the orders but implied that they might not have to be followed.)

MV Osorno (6,951 GRT, code-name Bernau, Kapitän Paul Hellmann) of the Hamburg America Line (HAPAG) with 3,882 long tons (3,944 t) of rubber, 1,797 long tons (1,826 t) of tin and 177 long tons (180 t) of tungsten, sailed from Kobe on 2 October, disguised as the British ship Prome, rounding the Cape of Good Hope on 15 November. Osorno was followed by the refrigerated cargo ship (reefer) Alsterufer (2,729 GRT, code-name Trave, Kapitan Piatek) of the Robert M. Sloman Jr. line of Hamburg, carrying 344 long tons (350 t) of tungsten; a year's worth of consumption in the German war economy. Rio Grande sailed third on 4 October 1943 from Yokohama; Weserland and Burgenland departed later in the month. Allied spies reported the arrival of the first three ships at Saigon (now Ho Chi Minh City), raising the alarm.

=== Marinegruppe West ===
In late December 1943 a Kriegsmarine destroyer flotilla, reinforced by six large Elbing-class torpedo boats, was ordered to the Bay of Biscay to escort the blockade runners Osorno and Alsterufer, which were carrying vital cargo from Japan (Operation Bernau). Osorno reached the Gironde on 26 December but struck a wreck in the estuary. She was beached and subsequently unloaded offshore. Alsterufer, carrying tungsten (Wolfram) and rubber, was en route to Europe.

==== 27 December ====
Korvettenkapitän Franz Kohlauf sailed from Brest on the morning of 27 December with the torpedo boats T23, T24, T26 and T22. The 8th Destroyer Flotilla (Kapitän zur See Hans Erdmenger) put out from the Gironde with destroyers Z24, Z37, Z32 and Z27, accompanied by two torpedo boats, T25 (Korvettenkapitän Wirich von Gartzen) and T27. By 04:00 the next day the 4th Flotilla was 300 nmi (560 km; 350 mi) due south of Cape Clear, the 8th Flotilla standing to the south, ready to meet Alsterufer. Just after noon the torpedo boats turned east, astern of the northernmost destroyers, taking station on their port side.

=== Plymouth Command ===
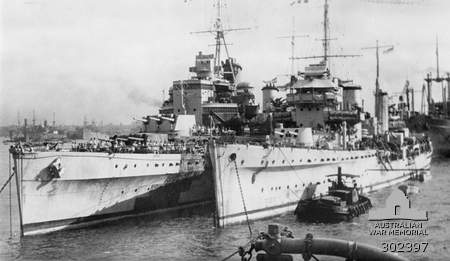
HMS Glasgow and HMS Enterprise shown together in 1942

The Admiralty were also aware of the impending arrival of Alsterufer through the decryption of German Enigma messages at Bletchley Park and ordered the nearest ships in the area to intercept Alsterufer. The closest ship was the light cruiser HMS Glasgow, which sailed from the Azores on 24 December; it was joined by HMS Enterprise. HMS Mauritius had been ordered from Gibraltar, HMS Penelope steamed past Lisbon and HMNZS Gambia was in the Western Atlantic.

The German flotillas did not know that during the previous afternoon a B-24 Liberator bomber of 311 (Czechoslovak) Squadron had attacked and set Alsterufer on fire. Abandoned by her crew, the ship was finished off by Liberators of 86 Squadron. This released the Glasgow and Enterprise, who were about 300 nmi (350 mi; 560 km) south-west of the German flotilla and were steaming eastwards along the 45th Parallel.

== Battle ==
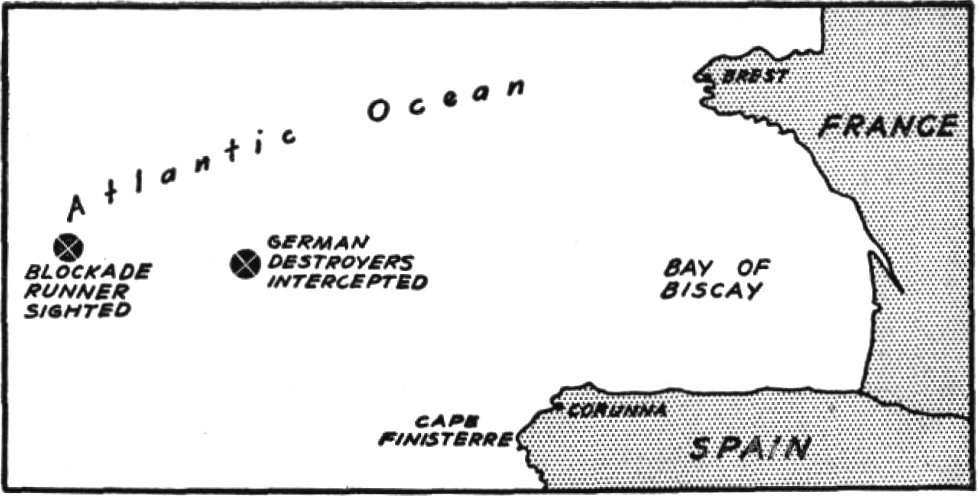
General map of the battle

Allied aircraft had already reported the position of the German ships around 13:00 on 28 December. About the same time a German Focke-Wulf Fw 200 Condor sighted and attacked both cruisers but was deterred by anti-aircraft fire. The German aircrew immediately turned north-east, reporting the position of the British cruisers more than half an hour later to Erdmenger. Captain Charles Clark on Glasgow, assuming that he had been reported, turned north-east, working around the position of the German ships to intercept them. The sea was becoming rougher and the wind had increased to 30 kn (56 km/h; 35 mph), making sailing difficult for the destroyers and torpedo boats.

Glasgow sighted the destroyers at 13:32 at a range of 16 nmi (30 km; 18 mi). The cruisers attacked at full speed and altered course to cut the German ships off from their base. Glasgow opened fire with its 6-inch 'A' and 'B' turrets using her Type 273 radar for ranging and Enterprise opened fire a few minutes later. The two leading German destroyers were not hit as shells missed by 330–490 ft (100–150 m). Z23 launched six torpedoes, three from each bank of tubes, when the range was down to 17,000 m (9.2 nmi; 11 mi) but missed. Both destroyers commenced firing with their 15 cm guns and the fall of shot was 660 ft (200 m) over on Glasgow's port quarter. At about 14:05, a German shell hit Glasgow, exploding in 'A' boiler room, killing two members of the port pom-pom crew and wounding six others; Enterprise was straddled by near misses.

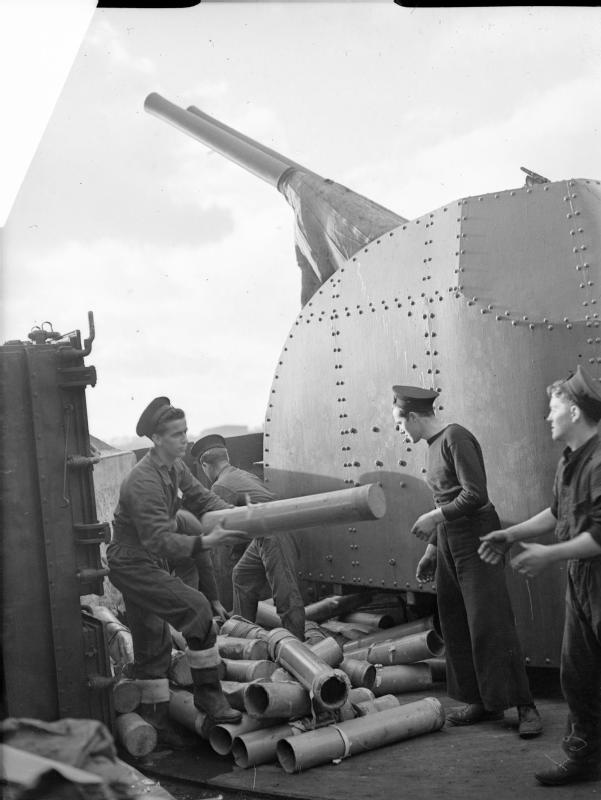
Sailors aboard HMS Glasgow clear cartridge cases ejected from the twin 4 inch Mark XVI guns

By 14:18 all of the German ships had engaged; the 4th Torpedo Boat Flotilla attempted several torpedo attacks but was frustrated by the heavy seas. Z32 and Z37 turned towards the cruisers, closed to 42,000 ft (12,800 m), launching six and four torpedoes respectively. Glasgow to make an emergency turn to port as the track of one torpedo passed about 98 ft (30 m) from the port quarter and two more near the port side. Enterprise had separated from Glasgow and acted independently. After the torpedo attack, the destroyers laid smoke and retired towards the flotilla. The German ships were in line, Z32 followed by Z24, Z37, T23, T27, T26, T22, T25, Z27 and Z25; Z32 and Z37 were off to port during their torpedo attack.

The German force split and Glasgow reversed course at 14:35 to chase the northerly group of destroyers; Enterprise had already altered course to the west to head them off. The Germans launched another torpedo attack but shortly after Z27 had fired, it received a shell hit from Enterprise in the boiler room, passing through an oil bunker which caused a huge fire. Clouds of steam gushed from the forward funnel as its speed fell off. After being hit, Z27 fired a salvo of four torpedoes but all missed.

Glasgow concentrated on T25, which received hits near the aft torpedo tubes, the Flakvierling and the 3.7 cm flak platforms, which killed or wounded their crews. Another shell demolished the mast and the funnel. T25 was reduced to a sitting duck and requested T22 to take off her crew. Glasgow changed aim to T26, which was quickly bracketed by near misses. T22 had both cruisers on its port side, fired a full spread of torpedoes and gunfire. The torpedoes missed and as T22 turned to starboard towards T25, it was bracketed by near misses. T22 abandoned the rescue attempt after suffering another hit and made smoke, fired her guns and withdrew to the south-west. T26 was still under fire and was soon severely hit in the boiler room and as T22 made smoke to screen it, T26 signalled that she was sinking; T22 turned away northwards.

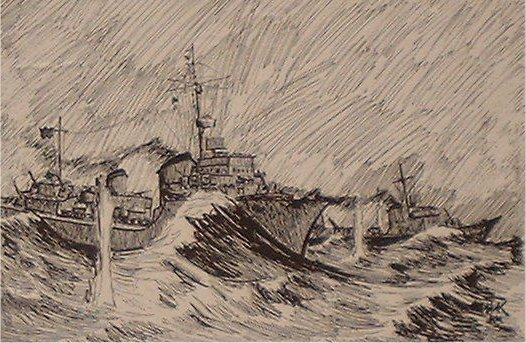
A sketch from Z27 of T25 and T26 being shelled during the battle

The cruisers reversed course, soon catching T26. Enterprise was ordered to sink it and Glasgow turned north again to search for damaged vessels, particularly T25. Glasgow soon came across Z27, drifting and silent. Closing to point-blank range, Glasgow hit the destroyer's magazines. A large explosion killed Erdmenger, his staff and the captain. Enterprise finished off T26 with a torpedo and then attacked T25, whose bridge and upper deck and aft superstructure were wrecked. Enterprise closed to 9,800 ft (3,000 m), firing guns and firing a torpedo; T25 was abandoned soon after, burning and sinking.

The cruisers converged and seeing no sign of the German squadron and after having sunk three ships for only minor damage, headed for Plymouth. The ships arrived on the evening of 29 December, low on fuel and ammunition. Glasgow had received a hit that killed two crew and wounded three; Enterprise had minor damage from shell splinters. T22 and Z23 headed for Saint-Jean-de-Luz near the Spanish border. The rest of the German ships returned to the Gironde.

== Aftermath ==
=== Analysis ===
Morale in the Kriegsmarine was already depressed with the news that the battleship Scharnhorst had been sunk at the Battle of the North Cape, two days before the losses in the Bay of Biscay. In daylight the stability of the larger cruisers as gun platforms in stormy seas, gave them an advantage and the long-range torpedo attacks of the Germans were ineffective. Osorno was the last blockade-runner to reach port, its cargo of rubber meeting German needs until November 1944. Three blockade-runners were sunk between 3 and 5 January 1944 by Allied patrols in the South Atlantic. The Germans abandoned surface blockade-running and turned to submarines, whose voyages became known as Yanagi missions.

=== Casualties ===
Two homebound and two outbound U-boats in the bay searched for survivors; the outbound Type IXC, U-505, found 34 men from T25 and turned back for France. The homebound U-618 picked up 21 survivors of Z27. Of the 672 men on the three lost ships, 93 were rescued from Z27, 100 from T25, 85 men being lost and 90 men from T26, three of the crew being lost. About 62 survivors were rescued by British minesweepers, 168 were rescued by a small Irish steamer, MV Kerlogue, and four were rescued by Spanish destroyers and interned.

== Orders of battle ==
=== German escorts ===
Marinegruppe West
Name	Flag	Type	Base	Notes
Z24	Kriegsmarine	Type 1936A destroyer	Gironde	8th Destroyer Flotilla
Z27	Kriegsmarine	Type 1936A destroyer	Gironde	8th Destroyer Flotilla
Z32	Kriegsmarine	Type 1936A (Mob) destroyer	Gironde	8th Destroyer Flotilla
Z37	Kriegsmarine	Type 1936A (Mob) destroyer	Gironde	8th Destroyer Flotilla
T22	Kriegsmarine	Type 39 torpedo boat	Brest	4th Torpedo Boat Flotilla
T23	Kriegsmarine	Type 39 torpedo boat	Brest	4th Torpedo Boat Flotilla
T24	Kriegsmarine	Type 39 torpedo boat	Brest	4th Torpedo Boat Flotilla
T25	Kriegsmarine	Type 39 torpedo boat	Gironde	4th Torpedo Boat Flotilla
T26	Kriegsmarine	Type 39 torpedo boat	Brest	4th Torpedo Boat Flotilla
T27	Kriegsmarine	Type 39 torpedo boat	Gironde	4th Torpedo Boat Flotilla

=== Plymouth Command ===
British cruisers
Name	Flag	Type	Notes
HMS Enterprise	Royal Navy	Emerald-class cruiser	
HMS Glasgow	Royal Navy	Town-class cruiser	

== Bibliography ==
- Blair, Clay (2000) [1999]. Hitler's U-Boat War: The Hunted 1942–45. Vol. II. London: Cassell. ISBN 0-304-35261-6 – via Archive Foundation.
- Brice, Martin (1981). Axis Blockade Runners of World War II. London: B. T. Batsford. ISBN 0-7134-2686-1.
- Brown, David (1995) [1990]. Warship Losses of World War Two (2nd rev. ed.). London: Arms and Armour Press. ISBN 978-1-85409-278-6.
- Chesneau, Roger (1997). Conway's All the World's Fighting Ships 1922–1946. London: Conway Maritime Press. ISBN 978-0-85177-146-5.
- Forsyth, Robert (2017). Shadow over the Atlantic: The Luftwaffe and the U-boats: 1943–45 (pdf ed.). Oxford: Osprey. ISBN 978-1-4728-2046-4.
- Hinsley, F. H.; Thomas, E. E.; Ransom, C. F. G.; Knight, R. C. (1984). British Intelligence in the Second World War, Its Influence on Strategy and Operations (Part I). History of the Second World War. Vol. III (1st ed.). London: HMSO. ISBN 0-11-630935-0.
- Kroener, Bernhard R.; Müller, Rolf-Dieter; Umbreit, Hans (2003) [1999]. Organization and Mobilization of the German Sphere of Power: Part 2 Wartime administration, economy and manpower resources1942–1944/5. Germany and the Second World War. Vol. V. Translated by Cook-Radmore, Derry; Osers, Ewald; Smerin, Barry; Wilson, Barbara (Eng. trans. Clarendon Press, Oxford ed.). Stuttgart: Deutsche-Verlags-Anstalt GMBH for Militärgeschichtliches Forschungsamt (Research Institute for Military History) Potsdam, Germany. ISBN 0-19-820873-1.
  - Müller, Rolf-Dieter. "Part II Albert Speer and Armaments Policy in Total War. III Basic conditions of wartime production and Civilian factors. 4. Organization and Exploitation of 'Fortress Europe'. (c) The Decline in Wartime Foreign Trade (xiii) Japan". In Kroener, Müller & Umbreit (2003).
- Lambert, Andrew (1986). Warship. Vol. X. Naval Institute Press. ISBN 978-0-85177-449-7.
- Nesbit, Roy Conyers (2008). Ultra Versus U-Boats: Enigma Decrypts in the National Archives. Casemate Publishers. ISBN 978-1-84415-874-4.
- O'Hara, Vincent P. (2004). The German Fleet at War, 1939–1945. Annapolis, Maryland: Naval Institute Press. ISBN 1-59114-651-8.
- Oldfield, Paul (2013). Cockleshell Raid. Battleground: French Coast. Barnsley: Pen & Sword. ISBN 978-1-78159-255-7.
- Rohwer, Jürgen; Hümmelchen, Gerhard (2005). Chronology of the War at Sea 1939–1945: The Naval History of World War Two (3rd rev. ed.). Annapolis, Maryland: Naval Institute Press. ISBN 1-59114-119-2.
- Roskill, S. W. (1957) [1954]. Butler, J. R. M. (ed.). The War at Sea 1939–1945: The Defensive. History of the Second World War United Kingdom Military Series. Vol. I (4th impr. ed.). London: HMSO. OCLC 881709135. Archived from the original on 27 February 2022.
- Roskill, S. W. (1962) [1957]. The War at Sea 1939–1945: The Period of Balance. History of the Second World War. Vol. II (3rd impr. ed.). London: HMSO. OCLC 174453986 – via Hyperwar.
- Roskill, Stephen (1960). Butler, J. R. M. (ed.). The War at Sea 1939–1945: The Offensive Part I 1st June 1943 – 31st May 1944. History of the Second World War United Kingdom Military Series. Vol. III. London: HMSO. OCLC 987392618.
- Saunders, H. St G. (1975) [1954]. Royal Air Force 1939–1945: The Fight is Won. History of the Second World War. Vol. III (pbk. repr. ed.). London: HMSO. ISBN 978-0-11-771594-3 – via Hyperwar Foundation.
- Tucker, Spencer (2011). World War II at Sea: An Encyclopedia. Vol. I. Santa Barbara, CA: ABC-CLIO. ISBN 978-1-59884-457-3.
- Stubner, Helmut (2012). Das Kampfflugzeug Heinkel 177 Greif und seine Weiterentwicklung [The Heinkel 177 Greif Bomber Aircraft and its Further Development] (in German). Eurodoc. ISBN 978-3-9522365-0-5.
- Waters, Sydney (1956). "Chapter 23: The New Zealand Cruisers". The Royal New Zealand Navy. The Official History of New Zealand in the Second World War 1939–1945 (online scan ed.). Wellington, NZ: Historical Publications Branch. pp. 353–355. OCLC 846919837 – via New Zealand Electronic Text Collection.
- Whitley, M. J. (1983). Destroyer!: German Destroyers in World War II. London: Arms & Armour Press. ISBN 978-0-85368-258-5.
