= German destroyer Z23 =

German Navy Type 1936A destroyer (1940–44)

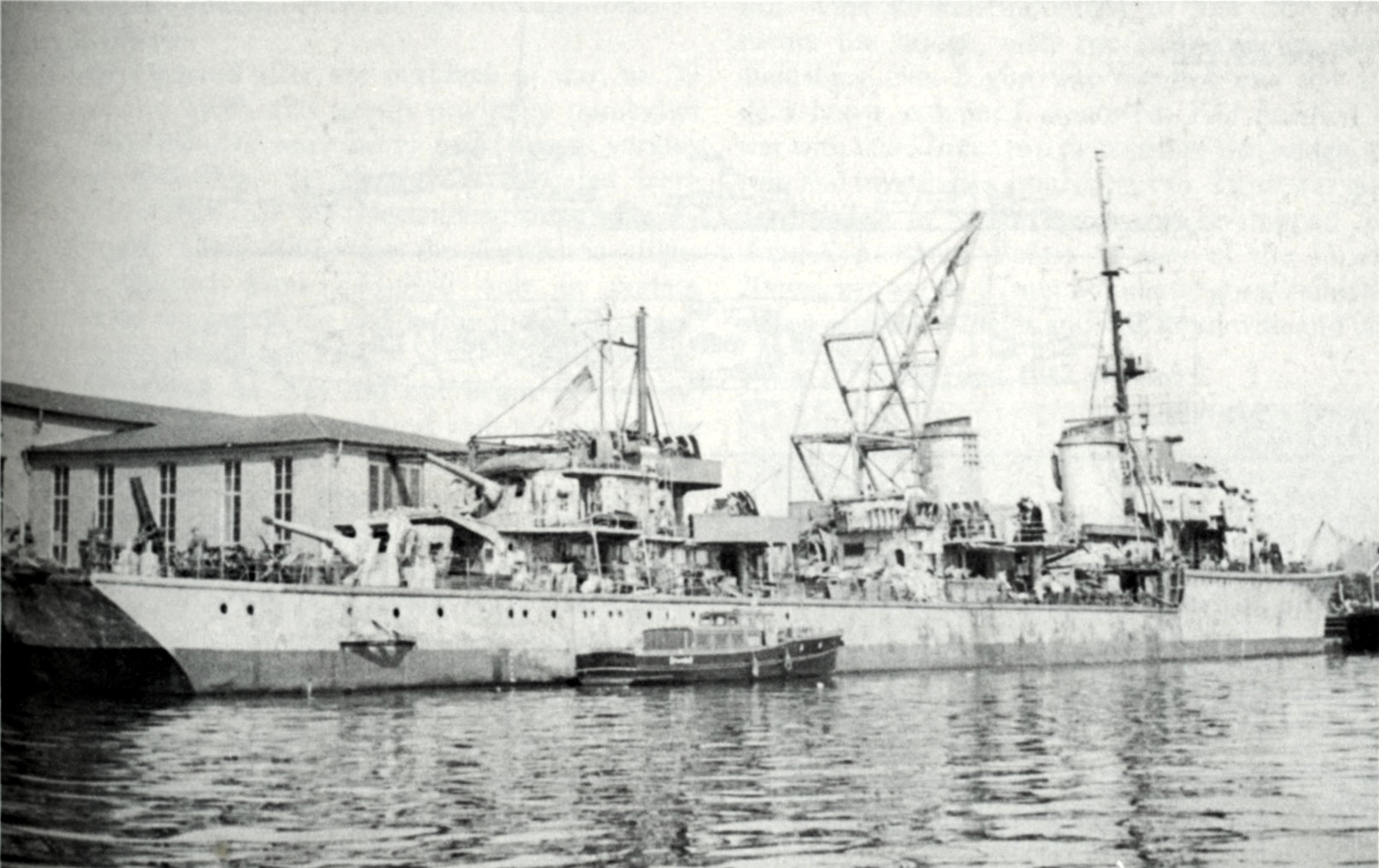
- Sister ship Z29, 1945

History

Nazi Germany
- Name: Z23
- Ordered: 23 April 1938
- Builder: AG Weser (Deschimag), Bremen
- Yard number: 957
- Laid down: 15 November 1938
- Launched: 15 December 1939
- Commissioned: 15 September 1940
- Decommissioned: 12 August 1944
- Fate: Scuttled, 21 August 1944; Scrapped, 1951

General characteristics (as built)
- Class & type: Type 1936A destroyer
- Displacement: 2,603 long tons (2,645 t) (standard); 3,605 long tons (3,663 t) (deep load)
- Length: 127 m (416 ft 8 in) (o/a)
- Beam: 12 m (39 ft 4 in)
- Draft: 4.65 m (15 ft 3 in)
- Installed power: 6 × water-tube boilers; 70,000 PS (51,000 kW; 69,000 shp)
- Propulsion: 2 × shafts; 2 × geared steam turbine sets
- Speed: 36 knots (67 km/h; 41 mph)
- Range: 2,500 nmi (4,600 km; 2,900 mi) at 19 knots (35 km/h; 22 mph)
- Complement: 332
- Armament: 4 × single 15 cm (5.9 in) guns; 2 × twin 3.7 cm (1.5 in) anti-aircraft guns; 5 × single 2 cm (0.8 in) AA guns; 2 × quadruple 53.3 cm (21 in) torpedo tubes; 4 × depth charge launchers; 60 mines

Z23 was one of fifteen Type 1936A destroyers built for the Kriegsmarine (German Navy) during World War II. Completed in 1940, the ship spent the war in Norwegian and French waters, escorting German ships and occasionally engaging Allied warships. In early 1941 she escorted ships between the Baltic and southern Norway before spending four months protecting ships as they transited through the Bay of Biscay. A few months after the Operation Barbarossa began in June, Z23 was transferred to northern Norway where she attempted to intercept one of the Arctic convoys returning from the Soviet Union and helped to lay several minefields.

Transferred back to France in early 1943 where she resumed her former role of escorting ships through the Bay of Biscay, which were threatened by Allied aircraft and cruisers attempting to prevent Axis blockade runners from reaching port through the bay. One such mission resulted in the Battle of the Bay of Biscay at the end of the year, in which Z23 played a minor role. On 12 August, she was bombed by British heavy bombers and was declared a constructive total loss. The French salvaged her after the war and used her as a source of spare parts for the ex-German destroyers that they had in service. The ship was condemned in 1951 and later broken up.

== Design and description ==
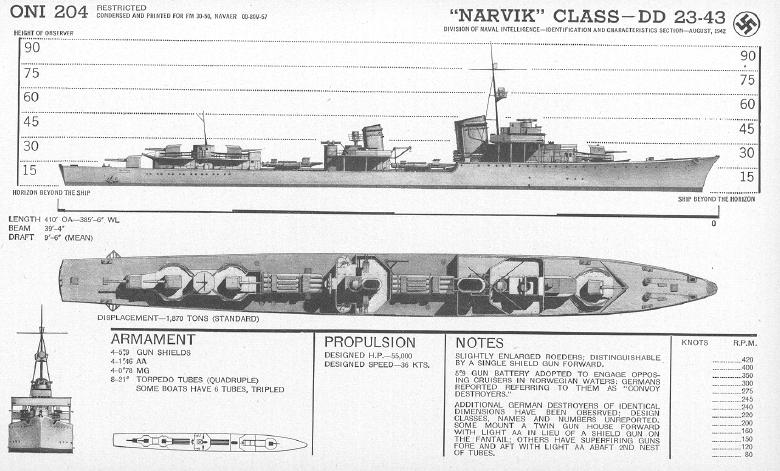
Wartime Allied recognition manual drawing of the Type 36A destroyer

The Type 1936A destroyers were slightly larger than the preceding Type 1936-class destroyer and had a heavier armament. They had an overall length of 127 meters (416 ft 8 in) and were 121.9 meters (399 ft 11 in) long at the waterline. The ships had a beam of 12 meters (39 ft 4 in), and a maximum draft of 4.62 meters (15 ft 2 in). They displaced 2,603 long tons (2,645 t) at standard load and 3,605 long tons (3,663 t) at deep load. The two Wagner geared steam turbine sets, each driving one propeller shaft, were designed to produce 70,000 PS (51,000 kW; 69,000 shp) using steam provided by six Wagner water-tube boilers for a designed speed of 36 knots (67 km/h; 41 mph). Z23 carried a maximum of 791 metric tons (779 long tons) of fuel oil which gave a range of 2,500 nautical miles (4,600 km; 2,900 mi) at 19 knots (35 km/h; 22 mph). Her crew consisted of 11 officers and 321 sailors.

The ship carried four 15-centimeter (5.9 in) TbtsK C/36 guns in single mounts with gun shields, one forward of the superstructure and three aft. Her anti-aircraft armament consisted of four 3.7-centimeter (1.5 in) C/30 guns in two twin mounts abreast the rear funnel and five 2-centimeter (0.8 in) C/30 guns in single mounts. Z23 carried eight above-water 53.3-centimeter (21 in) torpedo tubes in two power-operated mounts. Two reloads were provided for each mount. She had four depth charge launchers and mine rails could be fitted on the rear deck that had a maximum capacity of 60 mines. 'GHG' (Gruppenhorchgerät) passive hydrophones were fitted to detect submarines and an S-Gerät sonar was also probably fitted. The ship was equipped with either a FuMO 21 or FuMO 24/25 radar set above the bridge.

=== Modifications ===
Z23's single forward 15 cm gun was exchanged for a 15 cm LC/38 twin-gun turret during her early-1942 refit. This exacerbated the Type 36A's tendency to take water over the bow and reduced their speed to 32.8 knots (60.7 km/h; 37.7 mph). By 1944, the ship's anti-aircraft suite had been augmented by a pair of quadruple 2 cm mounts that may have been added during her early-1942 refit.

== Service history ==
Z23 was ordered from AG Weser (Deschimag) on 23 April 1938. The ship was laid down at Deschimag's Bremen shipyard as yard number W957 on 15 November 1938, launched on 15 December 1939, and commissioned on 15 September 1940. After working up, she began escorting ships between the Baltic and southern Norway between March and June 1941, notably the battleship Bismarck and the heavy cruisers Admiral Hipper, Admiral Scheer. On 12–13 June Z23 was one of the escorts for the heavy cruiser Lützow as the latter ship attempted to break out into the Atlantic. Several Bristol Beaufort aircraft spotted Lützow and her escorts off the Norwegian coast and one managed to surprise them and torpedo the cruiser early on the morning of 13 June, forcing her to return to Germany for repairs. Z23 was transferred to Brest, France, on the 16th, together with her sister Z24, and they helped to escort the battleship Scharnhorst through the Bay of Biscay on 20–24 July and covered the passage of the merchant raider Orion through the bay on 21–28 August. They were ordered to northern Norway on 23 October.

At the end of November the sisters reached Tromsø and was assigned to the 8. Zerstörerflottile (8th Destroyer Flotilla), commanded by Kapitän zur See (Captain) Hans Erdmenger. On 17 December, Z23, along with her sisters Z24, Z25, and Z27, sortied into the Barents Sea on 16 December 1941, searching for Allied ships off the coast of the Kola Peninsula. The following day, Z25's radar spotted two ships in heavy fog at a range of 37.5 kilometers (23.3 mi). The Germans thought that they were Soviet destroyers, but they were actually two British minesweepers, Hazard and Speedy, sailing to rendezvous with Convoy QP 6. The Germans intercepted them, but the heavy fog and icing precluded accurate gunfire. The British ships were able to escape despite four hits on Speedy and the heavy expenditure of ammunition. On 13 January 1942, Z25 escorted Z23 and Z24 as they laid a minefield in the western channel of the White Sea. A week later, Z23 accidentally rammed Z24 in heavy fog on 20 January, forcing the latter to return to Wesermünde and the former to sail to Trondheim for repairs and a lengthy refit that lasted until August.

After escorting the minelayer Ulm to Narvik, she participated in Operation Zarin, a minelaying mission off the island of Novaya Zemlya from 24 to 28 September, together with Admiral Hipper, and her sisters Z28, Z29, and Z30. On 23–24 October, the ship escorted the battleship Tirpitz and Admiral Scheer from Bogen Bay to Trondheim and continued to Copenhagen, Denmark, with Admiral Scheer, before returning to the Altafjord with the light cruiser Nürnberg. Engine problems prevented her from participating in Operation Regenbogen, an attack on Convoy JW 51B, at the end of the year.

On 5 March 1943, the 8. Zerstörerflottile (Z23, Z24, Z32 and Z37) was transferred via the English Channel to the French Atlantic coast in Operation Karin. Despite attacks by British coastal artillery and motor torpedo boats, the flotilla managed to pass through the Straits of Dover unscathed, but Z37 ran aground at Le Havre en route. The flotilla provided distant cover for an attempt by the Italian blockade runner Himalaya to sail for the Far East on 28 March, but the ship had to return to Bordeaux after it was spotted by a British reconnaissance aircraft. Two days later, the flotilla escorted the Italian blockade runner Pietro Orseolo through the Bay of Biscay despite the ship being torpedoed by an American submarine and under heavy attack by Bristol Beaufighter fighter-bombers and Beaufort torpedo bombers; the German destroyers shot down five of the attacking aircraft. Himalaya made another attempt to break out on 9 April, but the ships were spotted by a Short Sunderland flying boat. After reversing course, they were attacked by Vickers Wellington bombers and Handley Page Hampden torpedo bombers. Five of the attackers were shot down, but Z23 suffered 5 dead and 31 wounded during the battle. The flotilla escorted submarines through the bay for the rest of the summer. On 24–26 December, the ship was one of the escorts for the 6,951 GRT blockade runner MV Osorno through the Bay of Biscay. During the mission, heavy seas flooded her forecastle and she lost four men overboard before returning to Bordeaux.

=== Battle of the Bay of Biscay ===
Another blockade runner, the 2,729 GRT refrigerated cargo ship MV Alsterufer, trailed Osorno by several days and four destroyers, including Z23, of the 8. Flotille and six torpedo boats of the 4. Torpedobootflotille (4th Torpedo Boat Flotilla) set sail on 27 December to escort her through the bay. The Allies were aware of these blockade runners through their Ultra code-breaking efforts and positioned cruisers and aircraft in the Western Atlantic to intercept them in Operation Stonewall. A Consolidated B-24 Liberator heavy bomber from No. 311 Squadron RAF sank Alsterufer later that afternoon.

The German ships were unaware of the sinking until the following afternoon and continued onward to the rendezvous point. They had been spotted by an American Liberator bomber on the morning of the 28th and the British light cruisers Glasgow and Enterprise, which were assigned to Stonewall, maneuvered to intercept them. By this time, the weather had gotten significantly worse and the German ships were steaming for home, hampered by the rough seas that threw spray over their forward guns that made them very hard to work. In addition the spray severely reduced visibility and hampered the rangefinders and sights for the guns and torpedoes. Using her radar, Glasgow was the first to open fire at the closest German ships, Z23 and Z27, at 13:46 at a range of 19,600 meters (21,400 yd) with Enterprise following a few minutes later. Z23 fired six torpedoes once the range closed to 17,000 meters (19,000 yd), but they all missed. About that time, the destroyers began firing back. At 14:18 Erdmenger decided to split his forces and ordered Z23, Z27, and three torpedo boats to reverse course to the north. Z23 fired another torpedo, which also missed, five minutes later. The cruisers pursued the northern group and a hit in Z27's forward boiler room disabled one of her turbines and gradually reduced her speed. Glasgow and Enterprise concentrated their fire on the three torpedo boats after they turned south again at 14:39, sinking two of the torpedo boats. Z23 attempted to come to the drifting Z27's aid, but was ordered to disengage when Enterprise appeared. The torpedo boat T22 joined up with Z23 and the two ships reached Saint-Jean-de-Luz, close to the Spanish border, later that day.

On 30 January 1944, Z23 was carrying out exercises in the south of the Bay of Biscay with Z32 and Z37 when the former collided with Z37. The impact detonated a torpedo warhead, knocked out both turbines and started a large fire amidships. Z23 towed her to Bordeaux where she was deemed a constructive total loss. The ship resumed escorting uboats through the bay, but was docked at La Pallice when she was attacked by 14 Avro Lancaster heavy bombers on 12 August. One bomb penetrated through the forward boiler room, detonating on the harbor bottom, and another landed near by. The ship began to flood and took on a list to port unable to use her pumps until she was connected to shore power. Z23 was also deemed a constructive total loss and she was decommissioned on 20 August with all of her equipment destroyed that could not be salvaged. The French Navy refloated the ship in 1945 and towed the ship to Cherbourg two years later to use her for spares. She was condemned on 7 October 1951 and subsequently scrapped.
