= German destroyer Z27 =

Destroyer

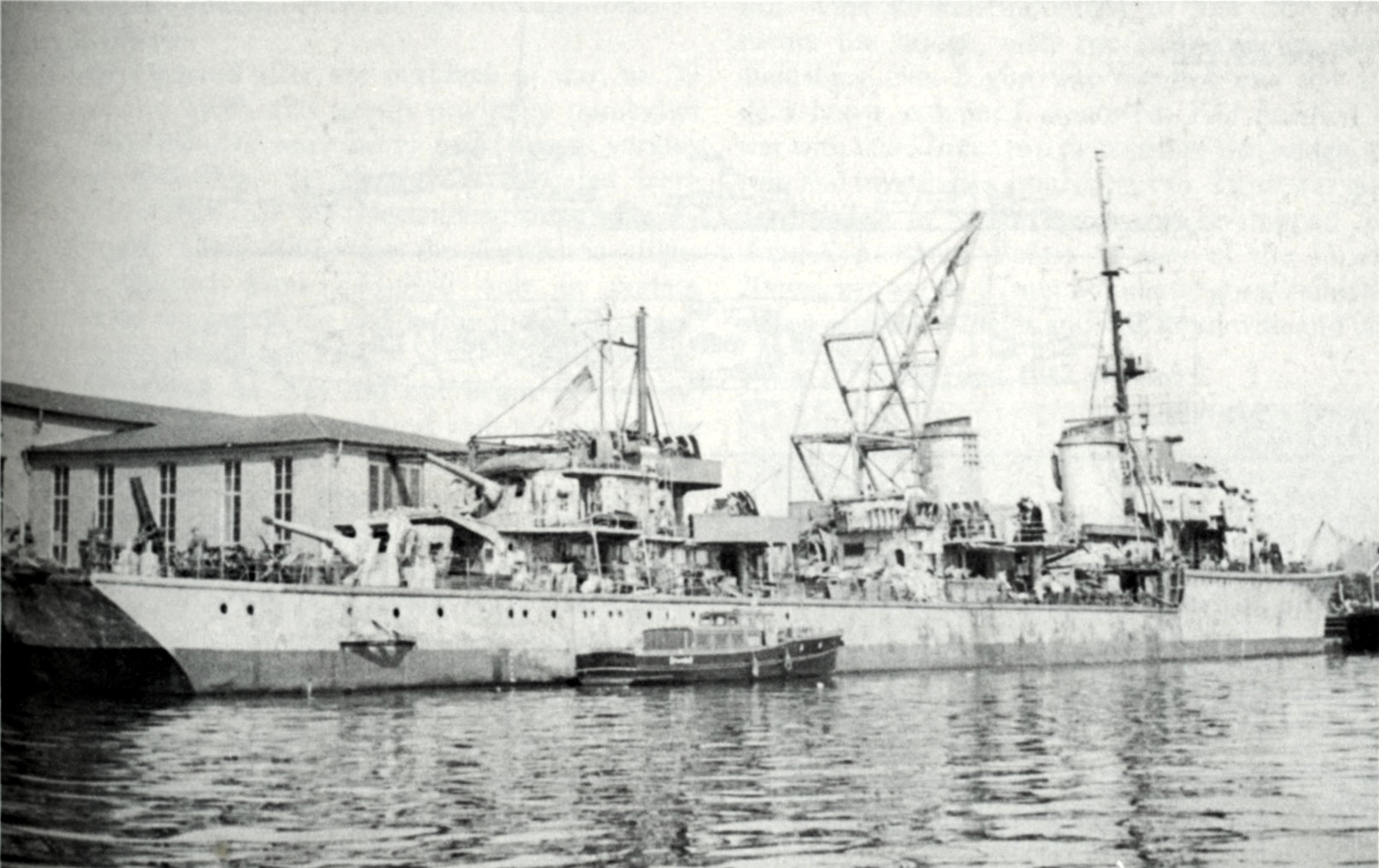
- Sister ship Z29, 1945

History

Nazi Germany
- Name: Z27
- Ordered: 23 April 1938
- Builder: AG Weser (Deschimag), Bremen
- Yard number: W961
- Laid down: 27 December 1939
- Launched: 1 August 1940
- Commissioned: 26 February 1941
- Fate: Sunk, 28 December 1943

General characteristics (as built)
- Class & type: Type 1936A destroyer
- Displacement: 2,543 long tons (2,584 t) (standard); 3,543 long tons (3,600 t) (deep load)
- Length: 127 m (416 ft 8 in) (o/a)
- Beam: 12 m (39 ft 4 in)
- Draft: 4.43 m (14 ft 6 in)
- Installed power: 6 × water-tube boilers; 70,000 PS (51,000 kW; 69,000 shp)
- Propulsion: 2 × shafts; 2 × geared steam turbine sets
- Speed: 36 knots (67 km/h; 41 mph)
- Range: 2,500 nmi (4,600 km; 2,900 mi) at 19 knots (35 km/h; 22 mph)
- Complement: 332
- Armament: 4 × single 15 cm (5.9 in) guns; 2 × twin 3.7 cm (1.5 in) anti-aircraft guns; 7 × single 2 cm (0.8 in) AA guns; 2 × quadruple 53.3 cm (21 in) torpedo tubes; 4 × depth charge launchers; 60 mines

Service record
- Commanders: Karl Smidt

Z27 was one of fifteen Type 1936A destroyers built for the Kriegsmarine (German Navy) during World War II. Completed in 1941, the ship was transferred to Norwegian waters later that year where she remained for most of the next several years, escorting convoys and laying minefields. She sank a Soviet oil tanker in late 1942 before sailing to Germany for a refit. Upon its completion in mid-1943, Z27 returned to Norway and participated in Operation Zitronella, the raid on the island of Spitsbergen in September.

The ship sailed to France the following month and became the flagship of the 8. Zerstörerflottile (8th Destroyer Flotilla) upon her arrival. The flotilla was tasked to escort several blockade runners through the Bay of Biscay in December despite Allied efforts to find and sink them. The first ship made it through the gauntlet successfully, but the second one was found and sunk while the German ships were en route to the rendezvous point. They were intercepted by a pair of British light cruisers and Z27 was sunk during the ensuing Battle of the Bay of Biscay on 28 December, with the loss of approximately 300 of her crew.

== Design and description ==
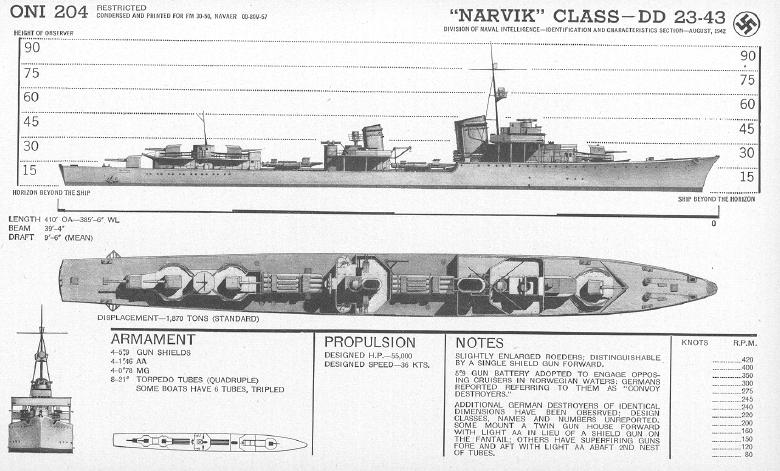
Wartime Allied recognition manual drawing of the Type 36A destroyer

The Type 1936A destroyers were slightly larger than the preceding Type 1936 class and had a heavier armament. They had an overall length of 127 meters (416 ft 8 in) and were 121.90 meters (399 ft 11 in) long at the waterline. The ships had a beam of 12 meters (39 ft 4 in), and a maximum draft of 4.62 meters (15 ft 2 in). They displaced 2,543 long tons (2,584 t) at standard load and 3,543 long tons (3,600 t) at deep load. The two Wagner geared steam turbine sets, each driving one propeller shaft, were designed to produce 70,000 PS (51,000 kW; 69,000 shp) using steam provided by six Wagner water-tube boilers for a designed speed of 36 knots (67 km/h; 41 mph). Z27 carried a maximum of 791 metric tons (779 long tons) of fuel oil which gave a range of 2,500 nautical miles (4,600 km; 2,900 mi) at 19 knots (35 km/h; 22 mph). Her crew consisted of 11 officers and 321 sailors.

The ship carried four 15-centimeter (5.9 in) TbtsK C/36 guns in single mounts with gun shields, one forward of the superstructure and three aft. Her anti-aircraft armament consisted of four 3.7-centimeter (1.5 in) C/30 guns in two twin mounts abreast the rear funnel and seven 2-centimeter (0.8 in) C/30 guns in single mounts. Z27 carried eight above-water 53.3-centimeter (21 in) torpedo tubes in two power-operated mounts. Two reloads were provided for each mount. She had four depth charge launchers and mine rails could be fitted on the rear deck that had a maximum capacity of 60 mines. 'GHG' (Gruppenhorchgerät) passive hydrophones were fitted to detect submarines and an S-Gerät sonar was also probably fitted. The ship was equipped with a FuMO 24/25 radar set above the bridge.

=== Modifications ===
While precise data is unavailable, Z27 probably received a pair of 2 cm quadruple mounts during 1942, most likely replacing several single mounts.

== Construction and career ==
Z27 was ordered from AG Weser (Deschimag) on 23 April 1938. The ship was laid down at Deschimag's Bremen shipyard as yard number W961 on 27 December 1939, launched on 1 August 1940, and commissioned on 26 February 1941. Her first commander was Korvettenkapitän (Lieutenant Commander) Karl Smidt. While still working up, she was assigned to escort the Baltic Fleet, a temporary formation built around the battleship Tirpitz, as it sortied into the Sea of Åland on 23–29 September to forestall any attempt by the Soviet Red Banner Baltic Fleet to breakout from the Gulf of Finland.

Two months later Z27 accompanied her sister ships, Z23 and Z25, from Germany to Norway and arrived in Tromsø on 6 December where she was briefly assigned to the 8. Zerstörerflottile. She was one of four destroyers that sailed into the Barents Sea on 16 December, searching for Allied ships off the coast of the Kola Peninsula. The following day, Z25's radar spotted two ships in heavy fog at a range of 37.5 kilometers (23.3 mi). The Germans thought that they were Soviet destroyers, but they were actually two British minesweepers, Hazard and Speedy, sailing to rendezvous with Convoy QP 6. The Germans intercepted them, but the heavy fog and icing precluded accurate gunfire. The British ships were able to escape despite four hits on Speedy and the heavy expenditure of ammunition; Z25 and Z27 attempted to fire 11 torpedoes between them, but were only able to launch one each. Z27 then developed problems with her propeller shaft and sailed for Germany on 5 January 1942 to begin a refit. The ship returned to Norway on May and took part in the preliminaries of Operation Rösselsprung, an attempt to intercept Convoy PQ 17 in early July. The heavy cruisers Admiral Scheer and her sister Lützow formed one group in Narvik with Z27 and four of her sisters while Tirpitz and the heavy cruiser Admiral Hipper composed another. While en route to the rendezvous at the Altafjord, Lützow and three destroyers of Tirpitz's escort ran aground, forcing the entire group to abandon the operation. On 13–15 October, Z27, her sister Z30 and the destroyers Z4 Richard Beitzen, Z16 Friedrich Eckoldt laid a minefield off the Kanin Peninsula at the mouth of the White Sea that sank the Soviet icebreaker Mikoyan. Three weeks later, the same four destroyers escorted Admiral Hipper as she attempted to intercept Allied merchant ships proceeding independently to Soviet ports in early November. While searching for convoy traffic at the far end of the patrol line, Z27 was alerted to the presence of a tanker by the Admiral Hipper's float plane on 7 November and set off in pursuit. The destroyer first intercepted and sank the submarine chaser BO-78 then caught up to and sank the westbound 8,000-gross register ton (GRT) Soviet oil tanker Donbass, rescuing survivors from both ships.

On 2 December, Z27 sailed to Bremen to begin a refit, returning to Norway on 15 June 1943. Together with Z30, she conducted several minelaying missions off southern Norway between 19 and 28 June. The ship took part in the raid on the island of Spitsbergen in September, during which she landed troops on the island. On the 24th she was one of four destroyers escorting Lützow to Kiel, Germany, and then proceeded to France on 31 October, together with the destroyer ZH1. During the voyage to Le Verdon-sur-Mer, both ships were slightly damaged by splinters from British coastal artillery as they passed through the English Channel. On 5 November they were unsuccessfully attacked by British motor torpedo boats off Cap d'Antifer, damaging several of their assailants. Now the flagship of Kapitän zur See (Captain) Hans Erdmenger, commander of the 8. Zerstörerflotille, the ship was one of the escorts for the 6,951 GRT blockade runner MV Osorno through the Bay of Biscay.

=== Battle of the Bay of Biscay ===
Another blockade runner, the 2,729 GRT refrigerated cargo ship MV Alsterufer, trailed Osorno by several days and four destroyers, including Z27, of the 8. Flotille and six torpedo boats of the 4. Torpedobootflotille (4th Torpedo Boat Flotilla) set sail on 27 December to escort her through the bay. The Allies were aware of these blockade runners through their Ultra code-breaking efforts and positioned cruisers and aircraft in the Western Atlantic to intercept them in Operation Stonewall. A Consolidated B-24 Liberator heavy bomber from No. 311 Squadron RAF sank Alsterufer later that afternoon.

The German ships were unaware of the sinking until the following afternoon and continued onward to the rendezvous point. They had been spotted by an American Liberator bomber on the morning of the 28th and the British light cruisers Glasgow and Enterprise, which were assigned to Stonewall, maneuvered to intercept them. By this time, the weather had gotten significantly worse and the German ships were steaming for home, hampered by the rough seas that threw spray over their forward guns that made them very hard to work. In addition the spray severely reduced visibility and hampered the rangefinders and sights for the guns and torpedoes. Using her radar, Glasgow was the first to open fire at the closest German ships, Z27 and her sister Z23, at 13:46 at a range of 19,600 meters (21,400 yd) with Enterprise following a few minutes later. Z23 fired six torpedoes once the range closed to 17,000 meters (19,000 yd), but they all missed. About that time, the destroyers began firing back. At 14:28 Z27 fired a spread of four torpedoes, which also missed, shortly after Erdmenger decided to split his forces and ordered Z23, Z27, and three torpedo boats to reverse course to the north. Seven minutes later, Z27 fired the rest of her ready torpedoes, all of which missed their target. The British ships pursued the northern group and a shell from Enterprise hit the destroyer in No. 2 boiler room shortly afterwards, severing the starboard main steam line, which forced the evacuation of the boiler room and knocked out the starboard turbine. The effects of the damage began to accumulate and the other boilers began to fail over the next hour or so, as did the feed pumps for the port turbine. While pursuing the scattered German forces several hours later, Glasgow spotted the drifting Z27 and closed to point-blank range before sinking her with gunfire at 16:41. A total of 93 men were rescued by a German submarine, Spanish destroyers, and an Irish merchantman, MV Kerlogue, but about 300 crewmen were killed.
