= Erich Gröner =

German naval historian

- Born: 16 March 1901; Berlin
- Died: 21 May 1965 (aged 64); Paris
- Occupation: Maritime historian

Erich Gröner (16 March 1901, in Berlin – 21 June 1965) was a German historian of naval warfare and shipbuilding.

== Early life and education ==
Erich Gröner was born on 16 March 1901 in Berlin, then capital of the German Empire. From 1910 to 1918, he attended the Käthe-Kollwitz Gymnasium He published his first treatise, A History of Maritime Trade and Sea War Shipping, at 15 years of age. Gröner enlisted voluntarily into the Kaiserliche Marine in 1918.

== Bibliography ==
- Keil, Thomas A. & Schenk, Peter (2006). "Dr. Dieter Jung (1933–2006) and the "Groener Circle" in Berlin". Warship International. XLIII (3): 311–326. ISSN 0043-0374.
