= German torpedo boat T25 =

Type 39 torpedo boat of the Kriegsmarine

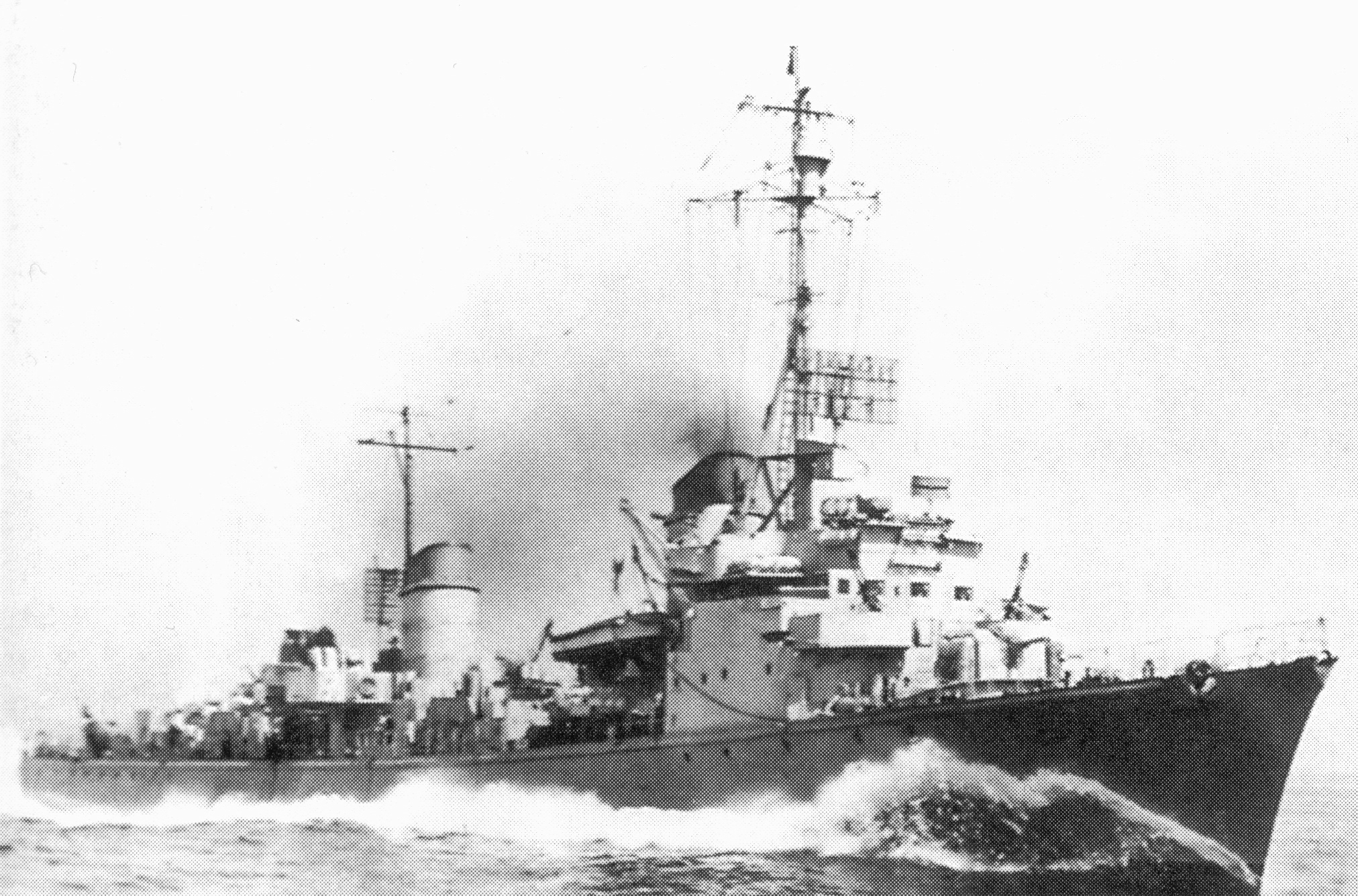
- Sister ship T35 in US service, August 1945

History

Nazi Germany
- Name: T25
- Ordered: 10 November 1939
- Builder: Schichau, Elbing, East Prussia
- Yard number: 1484
- Laid down: 30 November 1940
- Launched: 1 December 1941
- Completed: 12 November 1942
- Fate: Sunk, 28 December 1943

General characteristics (as built)
- Class & type: Type 39 torpedo boat
- Displacement: 1,294 t (1,274 long tons) (standard); 1,754 t (1,726 long tons) (deep load)
- Length: 102.5 m (336 ft 3 in) o/a
- Beam: 10 m (32 ft 10 in)
- Draft: 3.22 m (10 ft 7 in)
- Installed power: 4 × water-tube boilers; 32,000 shp (24,000 kW)
- Propulsion: 2 × shafts; 2 × geared steam turbine sets
- Speed: 33.5 knots (62.0 km/h; 38.6 mph)
- Range: 2,400 nmi (4,400 km; 2,800 mi) at 19 knots (35 km/h; 22 mph)
- Complement: 206
- Sensors & processing systems: S-Gerät sonar; FuMO 21 radar
- Armament: 4 × single 10.5 cm (4.1 in) guns; 2 × twin 3.7 cm (1.5 in) AA guns; 1 × quadruple, 2 × single 2 cm (0.8 in) AA guns; 2 × triple 533 mm (21 in) torpedo tubes; 30–60 mines; 4 × depth charge launchers

The German torpedo boat T25 was one of fifteen Type 39 torpedo boats built for the Kriegsmarine (German Navy) during World War II. Completed in late 1942, she was transferred to France in July 1943. T25 was unsuccessfully attacked by Allied motor torpedo boats and aircraft during her voyage down the English Channel and then came to the aid of a convoy being attacked by Allied destroyers. Later that year she escorted blockade runners and Axis submarines through the Bay of Biscay. T25 also helped to lay minefields in the English Channel in mid-1943. She participated in the Battle of Sept-Îles in October and was sunk two months later by British light cruisers during the Battle of the Bay of Biscay.

== Design and description ==
The Type 39 torpedo boat was conceived as a general-purpose design, much larger than preceding German torpedo boats. The boats had an overall length of 102.5 meters (336 ft 3 in) and were 97 meters (318 ft 3 in) long at the waterline. They had a beam of 10 meters (32 ft 10 in), a draft of 3.22 meters (10 ft 7 in) at deep load and displaced 1,294 metric tons (1,274 long tons) at standard load and 1,754 metric tons (1,726 long tons) at deep load. Their crew numbered 206 officers and sailors. The Type 39s were fitted with a pair of geared steam turbine sets, each driving one propeller, using steam from four high-pressure water-tube boilers. The turbines were designed to produce 32,000 shaft horsepower (24,000 kW) which was intended give the ships a maximum speed of 33.5 knots (62.0 km/h; 38.6 mph). They carried enough fuel oil to give them a range of 2,400 nautical miles (4,400 km; 2,800 mi) at 19 knots (35 km/h; 22 mph).

As built, the Type 39 ships mounted four 10.5 cm (4.1 in) SK C/32 guns in single mounts protected by gun shields; one forward of the superstructure, one between the funnels, and two aft, one superfiring over the other. Anti-aircraft defense was provided by four 3.7 cm (1.5 in) SK C/30 AA guns in two twin-gun mounts on platforms abaft the rear funnel, six 2 cm (0.8 in) C/38 guns in one quadruple mount on the aft superstructure and a pair of single mounts on the bridge wings. They carried six above-water 533 mm (21.0 in) torpedo tubes in two triple mounts amidships and could also carry 30 mines; the full complement of 60 mines made the ships top-heavy which could be dangerous in bad weather. For anti-submarine work the boats were fitted with a S-Gerät sonar and four depth charge launchers. The Type 39s were equipped with a FuMO 21 (Note: Funkmess-Ortung (Radio-direction finder, active ranging)) radar and various FumB (Note: Funkmess-Beobachtung (Passive radar detector).) radar detectors were installed late in the war.

== Construction and career ==
Originally ordered as a Type 37 torpedo boat on 30 March 1939, T25 was reordered on 10 November 1939 from Schichau. The boat was laid down on 30 November 1940 at their Elbing, East Prussia, shipyard as yard number 1484, launched on 1 December 1941 and commissioned on 12 November 1942. After working up until June 1943, on 3 July T25 and her sister T24 departed for Western France. On the morning of 5 July, the sisters were unsuccessfully attacked by three Dutch-manned motor torpedo boats and shelled by British coastal artillery. After reaching Boulogne harbor, they were attacked by Hawker Typhoon fighters on 6 July which were equally unsuccessful. The boats sailed shortly after midnight on 7 July, bound for Le Havre where they arrived without being attacked. On the night of 9/10 July, on passage between Saint-Malo and Brest, they were tasked to provide distant cover for a convoy that was escorted by five minesweepers off Ushant. The convoy was attacked by the British destroyers Melbreak, Wensleydale and the Norwegian-manned Glaisdale which sank one of the minesweepers and damaged another before T25 and T24 could arrive. The sisters heavily damaged Melbreak before the Allied ships disengaged. Now assigned to the 4th Torpedo Boat Flotilla, the torpedo boats were tasked to help escort U-boats through the Bay. On 2 August T25, T24 and their sister T22, responding to a distress call from another submarine, rescued survivors from the submarine U-106. From 29 to 31 August, the same three boats escorted the Japanese submarine I-8 through the Bay to Lorient.

T25 helped to lay minefields in the Channel from 3 to 5 September. While providing distant cover for a small convoy during the night of 3/4 October, the 4th Flotilla spotted a force of five British destroyers off the Sept-Îles near the coast of Brittany in the Channel and attacked with torpedoes with complete surprise. The first volley of five torpedoes all missed, but the British did not see them and continued on their course. Only when T23 turned on her radar to determine the range for a second volley did they react when one of the British destroyers detected the radar; they altered course just in time for the second volley of torpedoes to miss. Two of the British ships were able to pursue the retreating Germans at high speed, but both were damaged by German gunfire and forced to disengage.

=== Battle of Sept-Îles ===
On 22 October, the 4th Flotilla, now consisting of T25, T22, T23, and their sisters T26 and T27, sortied from Brest to provide cover for the unladen blockade runner Münsterland and her close escort from the 2nd Minesweeping Flotilla as they sailed up the Channel. The British were aware of Münsterland and attempted to intercept her on the night of the 23rd with a scratch force that consisted of the light cruiser Charybdis and the destroyers Grenville, Rocket, Limbourne, Wensleydale, Talybont and Stevenstone. T22's hydrophones detected the British ships off the Sept-Îles at 00:25 and Korvettenkapitän Franz Kohlauf maneuvered his flotilla to intercept them before they could reach Münsterland. Limbourne overheard the radio transmissions about 01:20 as the German ships turned and alerted the other British ships. At 01:36 Charybdis's radar detected the German torpedo boats at a range of 8,100 yards (7,400 m) and she fired star shells in an unsuccessful attempt to spot them visually. About this time, T23 spotted Charybdis silhouetted against the lighter horizon and Kohlauf ordered every boat to fire all of their torpedoes. Two of these struck the cruiser, which sank shortly afterwards, and another blew the bow off Limbourne, which had to be scuttled later. None of these torpedoes were fired by T25 as her partially trained torpedo officer did not react in time. The loss of the flagship threw the British into confusion as they had not worked together before the attack, and the torpedo boats successfully disengaged before the senior surviving British captain realized that he was in command.

=== Battle of the Bay of Biscay ===
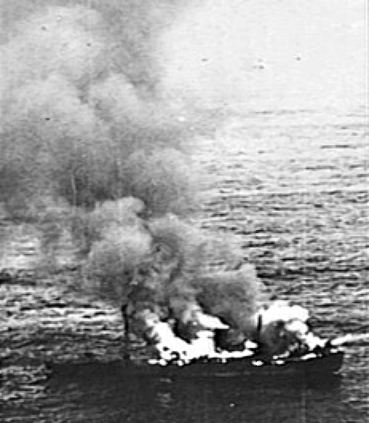
Alsterufer burning after a RAF attack

On 24–26 December T25 was one of the escorts for the 6,951 GRT blockade runner MV Osorno through the Bay of Biscay. Another blockade runner, the 2,729 GRT refrigerated cargo ship MV Alsterufer, trailed Osorno by several days and four destroyers of the 8th Destroyer Flotilla and the six torpedo boats of the 4th Flotilla set sail on 27 December to escort her through the Bay. The Allies were aware of these blockade runners through their Ultra code-breaking efforts and positioned cruisers and aircraft in the Western Atlantic to intercept them in Operation Stonewall. A Consolidated B-24 Liberator heavy bomber from No. 311 Squadron RAF sank Alsterufer later that afternoon.

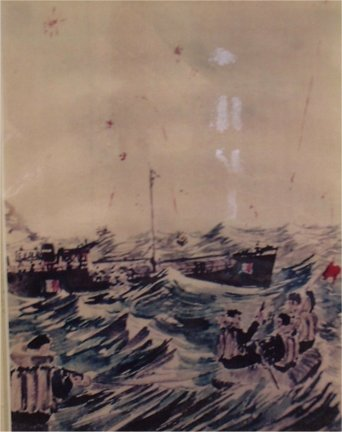
A sketch of the rescue drawn by Hans Helmut Karsch, while interned in the Curragh Camp (note the Irish tricolours on the Kerlogue) – National Maritime Museum of Ireland

The German ships were unaware of the sinking until the following afternoon and continued onward to the rendezvous point. They had been spotted by an American Liberator bomber on the morning of the 28th and the British light cruisers Glasgow and Enterprise, which were assigned to Stonewall, maneuvered to intercept them. By this time, the weather had gotten significantly worse and the German ships were steaming for home, hampered by the rough seas that threw sea spray over their forward guns which made their operation difficult. It also severely reduced visibility and hampered the rangefinders and sights for the guns and torpedoes. Using her radar, Glasgow was the first to open fire at 13:46 at a range of 19,600 meters (21,400 yd) with Enterprise following a few minutes later. About that time, the destroyers began firing back with guns and torpedoes; the latter all missed and one hit was made on Glasgow at 14:05. Kapitän zur See (Captain) Hans Erdmenger, commander of the 8th Flotilla, decided to split his forces and ordered the destroyers Z23, Z27, and T22, T25 and T26 to reverse course to the north at 14:18. The cruisers pursued them with Enterprise crippling Z27 and Glasgow engaging T25. At 14:54 the cruiser began to make multiple hits on T25, killing the crews of the aft torpedo tubes, the quadruple 2 cm gun mount and the 3.7 cm guns. They also stopped one turbine and severed the oil pipes supplying after engine room, causing the boat to lose speed. Another hit blew the foremast and the forward funnel overboard and knocked out electrical power. At 15:10 T25 fired her forward torpedoes without effect. Her captain requested that T22 come alongside and rescue his crew, but Glasgow's intense fire prevented her from complying. The cruiser switched targets to T26 shortly afterwards, leaving T24 drifting by herself with some hope of restarting one turbine. At 16:35 Enterprise reappeared and closed to a range of 3,000 yards (2,700 m), despite sporadic firing from the German guns, which were almost out of ammunition, before firing one torpedo that caused T25 to founder at 16:46 with the loss of 85 crewmen. The survivors were rescued by U-505, which picked up 34 men from T25; several hundred other survivors from Z27, T25 and T26 were rescued by the Irish merchantman MV Kerlogue, the British minesweeper Seaham and two Spanish destroyers, but the precise breakdown of which survivors belong to which ship is not available.
