= German torpedo boat T26 =

German torpedo boat

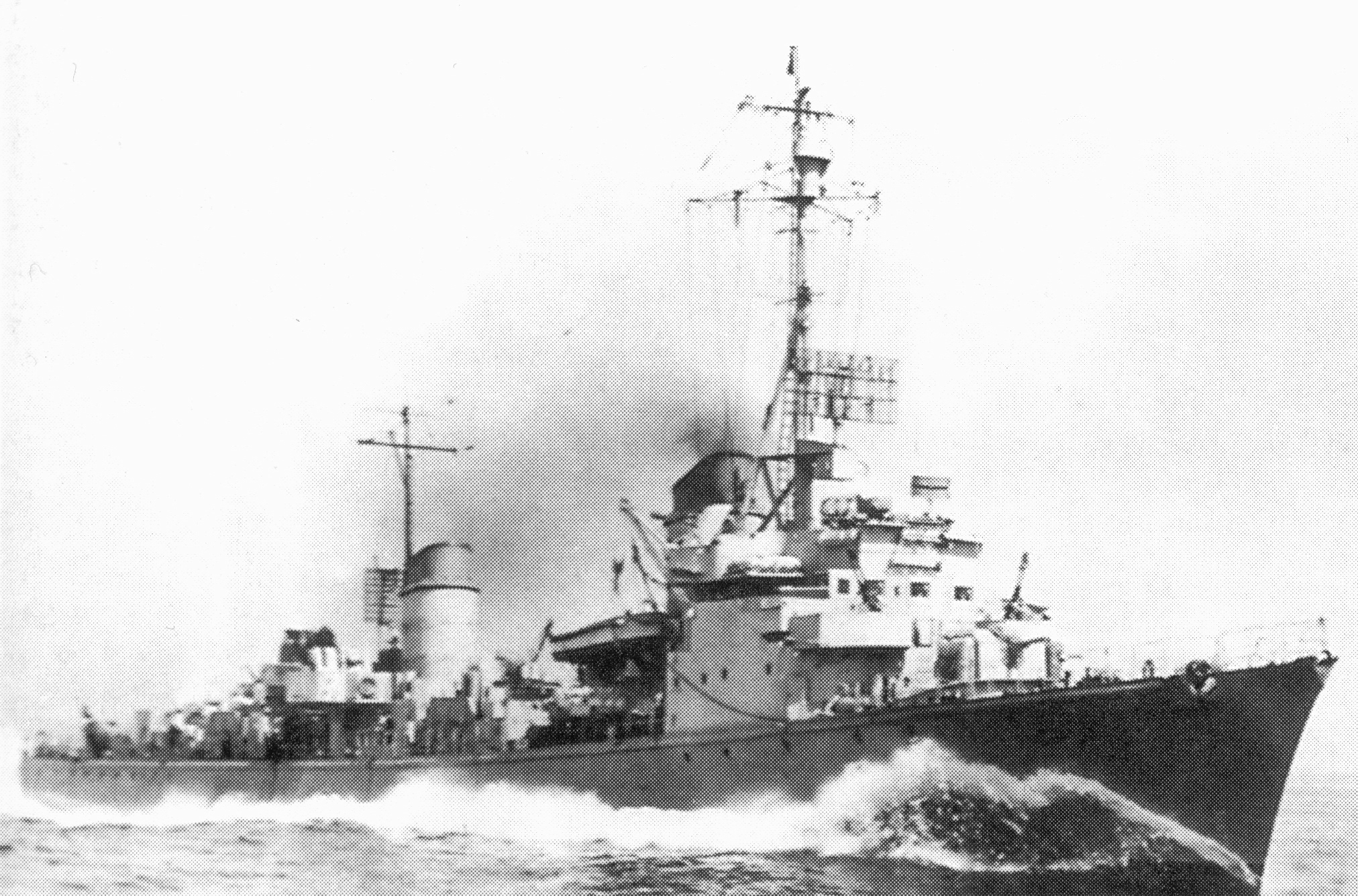
- Sister ship T35 in US service, August 1945

History

Nazi Germany
- Name: T26
- Ordered: 10 November 1939
- Builder: Schichau, Elbing, East Prussia
- Yard number: 1485
- Laid down: 10 May 1941
- Launched: 26 March 1942
- Completed: 28 February 1943
- Fate: Sunk, 28 December 1943

General characteristics (as built)
- Class & type: Type 39 torpedo boat
- Displacement: 1,294 t (1,274 long tons) (standard); 1,754 t (1,726 long tons) (deep load)
- Length: 102.5 m (336 ft 3 in) o/a
- Beam: 10 m (32 ft 10 in)
- Draft: 3.22 m (10 ft 7 in)
- Installed power: 4 × water-tube boilers; 32,000 shp (24,000 kW)
- Propulsion: 2 × shafts; 2 × geared steam turbine sets
- Speed: 33.5 knots (62.0 km/h; 38.6 mph)
- Range: 2,400 nmi (4,400 km; 2,800 mi) at 19 knots (35 km/h; 22 mph)
- Complement: 206
- Sensors & processing systems: S-Gerät sonar; FuMO 21 radar
- Armament: 4 × single 10.5 cm (4.1 in) guns; 2 × twin 3.7 cm (1.5 in) AA guns; 1 × quadruple, 2 × single 2 cm (0.8 in) AA guns; 2 × triple 533 mm (21 in) torpedo tubes; 30–60 mines; 4 × depth charge launchers

The German torpedo boat T26 was one of fifteen Type 39 torpedo boats built for the Kriegsmarine (German Navy) during World War II. Completed in early 1943, the boat was transferred to France in August. T26 helped to lay a minefield in the English Channel the following month, and later escorted a blockade runner through the Bay of Biscay. She participated in the Battle of Sept-Îles in October and was sunk two months later by a British light cruiser during the Battle of the Bay of Biscay.

== Design and description ==
The Type 39 torpedo boat was conceived as a general-purpose design, much larger than preceding German torpedo boats. The boats had an overall length of 102.5 meters (336 ft 3 in) and were 97 meters (318 ft 3 in) long at the waterline. They had a beam of 10 meters (32 ft 10 in), a draft of 3.22 meters (10 ft 7 in) at deep load and displaced 1,294 metric tons (1,274 long tons) at standard load and 1,754 metric tons (1,726 long tons) at deep load. Their crew numbered 206 officers and sailors. The Type 39s were fitted with a pair of geared steam turbine sets, each driving one propeller, using steam from four high-pressure water-tube boilers. The turbines were designed to produce 32,000 shaft horsepower (24,000 kW) which was intended give the ships a maximum speed of 33.5 knots (62.0 km/h; 38.6 mph). They carried enough fuel oil to give them a range of 2,400 nautical miles (4,400 km; 2,800 mi) at 19 knots (35 km/h; 22 mph).

As built, the Type 39 ships mounted four 10.5 cm (4.1 in) SK C/32 guns in single mounts protected by gun shields; one forward of the superstructure, one between the funnels, and two aft, one superfiring over the other. Anti-aircraft defense was provided by four 3.7 cm (1.5 in) SK C/30 AA guns in two twin-gun mounts on platforms abaft the rear funnel, six 2 cm (0.8 in) C/38 guns in one quadruple mount on the aft superstructure and a pair of single mounts on the bridge wings. They carried six above-water 533 mm (21 in) torpedo tubes in two triple mounts amidships and could also carry 30 mines; the full complement of 60 mines made the ships top-heavy which could be dangerous in bad weather). For anti-submarine work, the boats were fitted with a S-Gerät sonar and four depth charge launchers. The Type 39s were equipped with a FuMO 21 (Note: Funkmess-Ortung (Radio-direction finder, active ranging)) radar and various FumB (Note: Funkmess-Beobachtung (Passive radar detector).) radar detectors were installed late in the war.

== Construction and career ==
Originally ordered as a Type 37 torpedo boat on 30 March 1939, T26 was reordered on 10 November 1939 from Schichau. The boat was laid down on 10 May 1941 at their Elbing, East Prussia, shipyard as yard number 1485, launched on 26 March 1942 and commissioned on 28 February 1943. After working up, T26 and her sister T27 departed for Western France on 30 August 1943. The sisters, together with the torpedo boats Kondor, Greif and T19, laid a minefield in the Channel on 29–30 September.

=== Battle of Sept-Îles ===
On 22 October, the 4th Torpedo Boat Flotilla, now consisting of T26, T27, and their sisters T22, T23 and T25, sortied from Brest to provide cover for the unladen blockade runner Münsterland and her close escort from the 2nd Minesweeping Flotilla as they sailed up the Channel. The British were aware of Münsterland and attempted to intercept her on the night of the 23rd with a scratch force that consisted of the light cruiser Charybdis and the destroyers Grenville, Rocket, Limbourne, Wensleydale, Talybont and Stevenstone. T22's hydrophones detected the British ships off the Sept-Îles at 00:25 and Korvettenkapitän Franz Kohlauf maneuvered his flotilla to intercept them before they could reach Münsterland. Limbourne overheard the radio transmissions about 01:20 as the German ships turned, and alerted the other British ships. At 01:36 Charybdis's radar detected the German torpedo boats at a range of 8,100 yards (7,400 m) and she fired star shells in an unsuccessful attempt to spot them visually. About this time, T23 spotted Charybdis silhouetted against the lighter horizon and Kohlauf ordered every boat to fire all of their torpedoes. Two of these struck the cruiser, which sank shortly afterwards, and another blew the bow off Limbourne, which had to be scuttled later. The loss of the flagship threw the British into confusion as they had not worked together before the attack, and the torpedo boats successfully disengaged before the senior surviving British captain realized that he was in command.

=== Battle of the Bay of Biscay ===
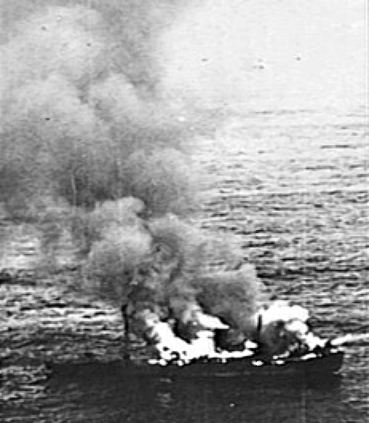
Alsterufer burning after a RAF attack

On 24–26 December T26 was one of the escorts for the 6,951 GRT blockade runner MV Osorno through the Bay of Biscay. Another blockade runner, the 2,729 GRT refrigerated cargo ship MV Alsterufer, trailed Osorno by several days and four destroyers of the 8th Destroyer Flotilla and the six torpedo boats of the 4th Flotilla set sail on 27 December to escort her through the Bay. The Allies were aware of these blockade runners through their Ultra code-breaking efforts and positioned cruisers and aircraft in the Western Atlantic to intercept them in Operation Stonewall. A Consolidated B-24 Liberator heavy bomber from No. 311 Squadron RAF sank Alsterufer later that afternoon.

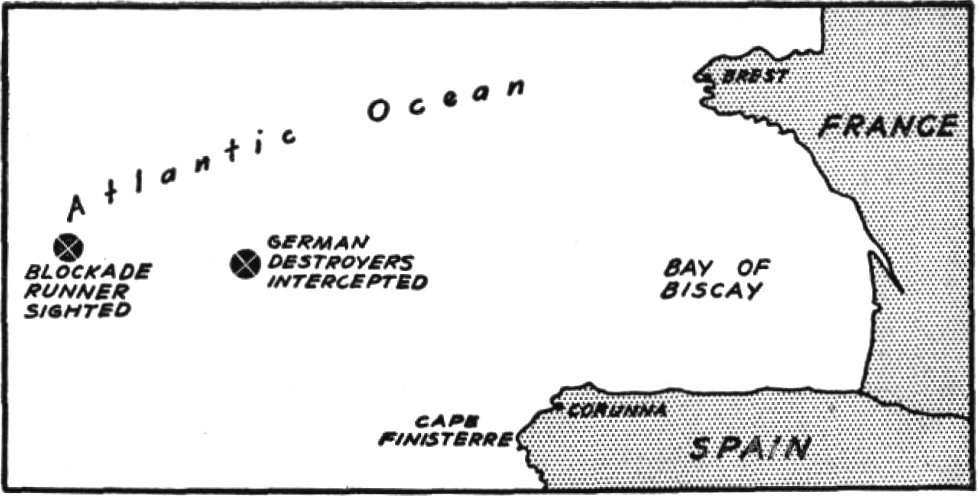
Map of the Battle of Biscay

The German ships were unaware of the sinking until the following afternoon and continued onward to the rendezvous point. They had been spotted by an American Liberator bomber on the morning of the 28th and the British light cruisers Glasgow and Enterprise, which were assigned to Stonewall, maneuvered to intercept them. By this time, the weather had gotten significantly worse and the German ships were steaming for home, hampered by the rough seas that threw sea spray over their forward guns which made their operation difficult. It also severely reduced visibility and hampered the rangefinders and sights for the guns and torpedoes. Using her radar, Glasgow was the first to open fire at 13:46 at a range of 19,600 meters (21,400 yd) with Enterprise following a few minutes later. About that time, the destroyers began firing back with guns and torpedoes; the latter all missed and one hit was made on Glasgow at 14:05. Kapitän zur See (Captain) Hans Erdmenger, commander of the 8th Flotilla, decided to split his forces and ordered the destroyers Z23 and Z27, along with T22, T25 and T26, to reverse course to the north at 14:18. The cruisers pursued them with Enterprise crippling Z27 and Glasgow severely damaging T25. Both cruisers then switch targets to T26 and she was sunk by a torpedo from Enterprise at 16:00 with the loss of 90 crewmen. Several hundred survivors from Z27, T25 and T26 were rescued by the Irish merchantman MV Kerlogue, the British minesweeper Seaham and two Spanish destroyers, but the precise breakdown of which survivors belonged to which ship is not available.
