= German torpedo boat T27 =

German torpedo boat

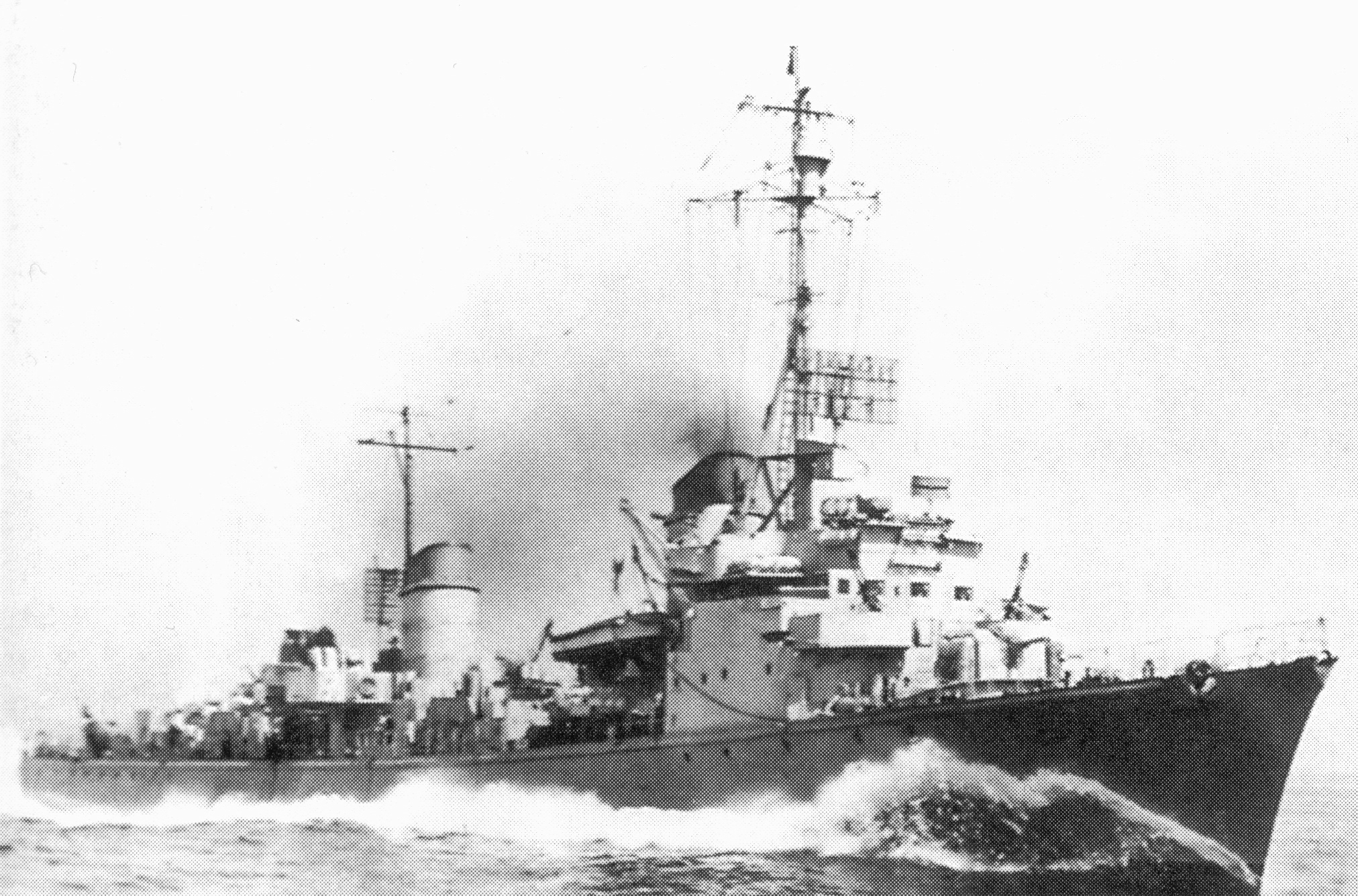
- Sister ship T35 in US service, August 1945

History

Nazi Germany
- Name: T27
- Ordered: 10 November 1939
- Builder: Schichau, Elbing, East Prussia
- Yard number: 1486
- Laid down: 2 July 1941
- Launched: 20 June 1942
- Completed: 17 April 1943
- Fate: Ran aground, 29 April 1944

General characteristics (as built)
- Class & type: Type 39 torpedo boat
- Displacement: 1,294 t (1,274 long tons) (standard); 1,754 t (1,726 long tons) (deep load)
- Length: 102.5 m (336 ft 3 in) o/a
- Beam: 10 m (32 ft 10 in)
- Draft: 3.22 m (10 ft 7 in)
- Installed power: 4 × water-tube boilers; 32,000 shp (24,000 kW)
- Propulsion: 2 × shafts; 2 × geared steam turbine sets
- Speed: 33.5 knots (62.0 km/h; 38.6 mph)
- Range: 2,400 nmi (4,400 km; 2,800 mi) at 19 knots (35 km/h; 22 mph)
- Complement: 206
- Sensors & processing systems: S-Gerät sonar; FuMO 21 radar
- Armament: 4 × single 10.5 cm (4.1 in) guns; 2 × twin 3.7 cm (1.5 in) AA guns; 1 × quadruple, 2 × single 2 cm (0.8 in) AA guns; 2 × triple 533 mm (21 in) torpedo tubes; 30–60 mines; 4 × depth charge launchers

The German torpedo boat T27 was one of fifteen Type 39 torpedo boats built for the Kriegsmarine (German Navy) during World War II. Completed in early 1943, the boat was transferred to France in August. T27 helped to lay a minefield in the English Channel the following month, and later escorted a blockade runner through the Bay of Biscay. She participated in the Battle of Sept-Îles in October and played a minor role in the Battle of the Bay of Biscay. The boat was lightly damaged during the action of 26 April 1944 off the coast of Brittany and ran aground during the subsequent battle two days later. Her wreck was destroyed shortly afterwards by the British.

== Design and description ==
The Type 39 torpedo boat was conceived as a general-purpose design, much larger than preceding German torpedo boats. The boats had an overall length of 102.5 meters (336 ft 3 in) and were 97 meters (318 ft 3 in) long at the waterline. They had a beam of 10 meters (32 ft 10 in), a draft of 3.22 meters (10 ft 7 in) at deep load and displaced 1,294 metric tons (1,274 long tons) at standard load and 1,754 metric tons (1,726 long tons) at deep load. Their crew numbered 206 officers and sailors. The Type 39s were fitted with a pair of geared steam turbine sets, each driving one propeller, using steam from four high-pressure water-tube boilers. The turbines were designed to produce 32,000 shaft horsepower (24,000 kW) which was intended give the ships a maximum speed of 33.5 knots (62.0 km/h; 38.6 mph). They carried enough fuel oil to give them a range of 2,400 nautical miles (4,400 km; 2,800 mi) at 19 knots (35 km/h; 22 mph).

As built, the Type 39 ships mounted four 10.5 cm (4.1 in) SK C/32 guns in single mounts protected by gun shields; one forward of the superstructure, one between the funnels, and two aft, one superfiring over the other. Anti-aircraft defense was provided by four 3.7 cm (1.5 in) SK C/30 AA guns in two twin-gun mounts on platforms abaft the rear funnel, six 2 cm (0.8 in) C/38 guns in one quadruple mount on the aft superstructure and a pair of single mounts on the bridge wings. They carried six above-water 533 mm (21 in) torpedo tubes in two triple mounts amidships and could also carry 30 mines; the full complement of 60 mines made the ships top-heavy which could be dangerous in bad weather. For anti-submarine work the boats were fitted with a S-Gerät sonar and four depth charge launchers. The Type 39s were equipped with a FuMO 21 (Note: Funkmess-Ortung (Radio-direction finder, active ranging)) radar. In January–February 1944 the single 2 cm mounts in the bridge wings were replaced by quadruple mounts and FuMB7 (Note: Funkmess-Beobachtung (Passive radar detector).) "Naxos" and FuMB8 "Wanz G" radar detectors were installed.

== Construction and career ==
Originally ordered as a Type 37 torpedo boat on 30 March 1939, T27 was reordered on 10 November 1939 from Schichau. The boat was laid down on 2 July 1941 at their Elbing, East Prussia, shipyard as yard number 1486, launched on 20 June 1942 and commissioned on 17 April 1943. After working up, T27 and her sister T26 departed for Western France on 30 August 1943. The sisters, together with the torpedo boats Kondor, Greif and T19, laid a minefield in the Channel on 29–30 September.

=== Battle of Sept-Îles ===
On 22 October, the 4th Torpedo Boat Flotilla, now consisting of T27, T26, and their sisters T22, T23 and T25, sortied from Brest to provide cover for the unladen blockade runner Münsterland and her close escort from the 2nd Minesweeping Flotilla as they sailed up the Channel. The British were aware of Münsterland and attempted to intercept her on the night of the 23rd with a scratch force that consisted of the light cruiser Charybdis and the destroyers Grenville, Rocket, Limbourne, Wensleydale, Talybont and Stevenstone. T22's hydrophones detected the British ships off the Sept-Îles at 00:25 and Korvettenkapitän (Lieutenant commander) Franz Kohlauf maneuvered his flotilla to intercept them before they could reach Münsterland. Limbourne overheard the radio transmissions about 01:20 as the German ships turned, and alerted the other British ships. At 01:36 Charybdis's radar detected the German torpedo boats at a range of 8,100 yards (7,400 m) and she fired star shells in an unsuccessful attempt to spot them visually. About this time, T23 spotted Charybdis silhouetted against the lighter horizon and Kohlauf ordered every boat to fire all of their torpedoes. Two of these struck the cruiser, which sank shortly afterwards, and another blew the bow off Limbourne, which had to be scuttled later. The loss of the flagship threw the British into confusion as they had not worked together before the attack, and the torpedo boats successfully disengaged before the senior surviving British captain realized that he was in command.

=== Battle of the Bay of Biscay ===
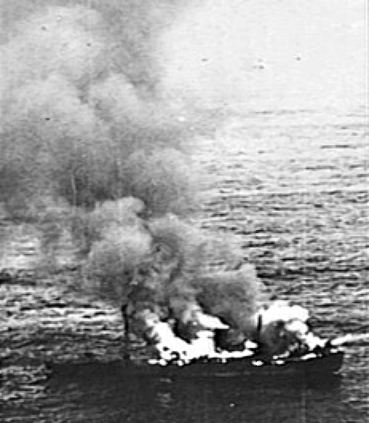
Alsterufer burning after a RAF attack

On 24–26 December T27 was one of the escorts for the 6,951 GRT blockade runner MV Osorno through the Bay of Biscay. Another blockade runner, the 2,729 GRT refrigerated cargo ship MV Alsterufer, trailed Osorno by several days and four destroyers of the 8th Destroyer Flotilla and the six torpedo boats of the 4th Flotilla set sail on 27 December to escort her through the Bay. The Allies were aware of these blockade runners through their Ultra code-breaking efforts and positioned cruisers and aircraft in the Western Atlantic to intercept them in Operation Stonewall. A Consolidated B-24 Liberator heavy bomber from No. 311 Squadron RAF sank Alsterufer later that afternoon.

The German ships were unaware of the sinking until the following afternoon and continued onward to the rendezvous point. They had been spotted by an American Liberator bomber on the morning of the 28th and the British light cruisers Glasgow and Enterprise, which were assigned to Stonewall, maneuvered to intercept them. By this time, the weather had gotten significantly worse and the German ships were steaming for home, hampered by the rough seas that threw sea spray over their forward guns that made their operation difficult. It also severely reduced visibility and hampered the rangefinders and sights for the guns and torpedoes. Using her radar, Glasgow was the first to open fire at 13:46 at a range of 19,600 meters (21,400 yd) with Enterprise following a few minutes later. About that time, the destroyers began firing back with guns and torpedoes; the latter all missed and one hit was made on Glasgow at 14:05. Kapitän zur See (Captain) Hans Erdmenger, commander of the 8th Flotilla, decided to split his forces and ordered the destroyers Z23 and Z27, together with T22, T25 and T26, to reverse course to the north at 14:18. All of the ships in the southern group, including T27, were able to successfully disengage.

=== Subsequent activities ===
On the night of 21/22 April 1944, the 4th Flotilla, now consisting of T27 and her sisters T24 and T29, transferred from Cherbourg to Saint-Malo. After laying a minefield off the Sept-Îles on the north coast of Brittany on the night of 25/26 April, the flotilla was engaged by an Allied force that consisted of the light cruiser HMS Black Prince and the destroyers HMS Ashanti, HMCS Athabaskan, HMCS Haida and HMCS Huron off the Île de Batz. The Allied ships were engaged by German coastal artillery without effect and the flotilla headed west in search of the Allied ships, but the Germans were spotted first by Black Prince's radar at a range of 21,000 yards (19,000 m) at 02:07. They detected the Allied ships shortly afterwards and reversed course. The Allied ships were faster than the torpedo boats and had closed the range to 13,000 yards (12,000 m) by 02:20 when Black Prince began firing star shells. The destroyers began firing at T27 and T24 at a range of 9,000 yards (8,200 m) as Black Prince hung back in support until one of her forward turrets jammed. The Allied fire was accurate and one shell struck T27 at 02:31 and reduced her speed to 12 knots (22 km/h; 14 mph); Kohlauf ordered her into Morlaix Bay and the Allies lost her radar reflection amongst the rocks of the bay.

After emergency repairs, T27 joined T24 in Saint-Malo during the night of 26/27 April. The sister departed Saint-Malo bound for Brest on the night of 28/29 April and were spotted by British coastal radar. They intercepted by Haida and Athabaskan off Île Vierge. Haida opened the engagement by firing star shell at 04:12; the Germans laid a smoke screen in response and turned away. The sisters fired all of their torpedoes as they turned, T24 firing three off the wrong side of the boat, but one of the others hit Athabaskan. Shortly afterwards, she blew up, probably from a magazine explosion, and sank at 04:42. Haida pursued T27 and hit her at least seven times, setting her on fire and destroying both quadruple 2 cm mounts on the bridge wings. While trying to reach Aber Wrac'h, she accidentally ran aground at 48°39′N 04°21′W; Haida continued to engage the torpedo boat and ignited the 2 cm ready-use ammunition on the bridge wings before returning to rescue Athabaskan's survivors. Lacking power, T27's crew was unable to put the fire out and abandoned ship at 04:35, having lost 11 men killed. T24 and a pair of minesweepers later failed in their attempt to pull her off, but they rescued 83 crewmen before they abandoned the wreck. British motor torpedo boats and aircraft destroyed the wreck in early May.
