= German torpedo boat T22 =

German World War II torpedo boat

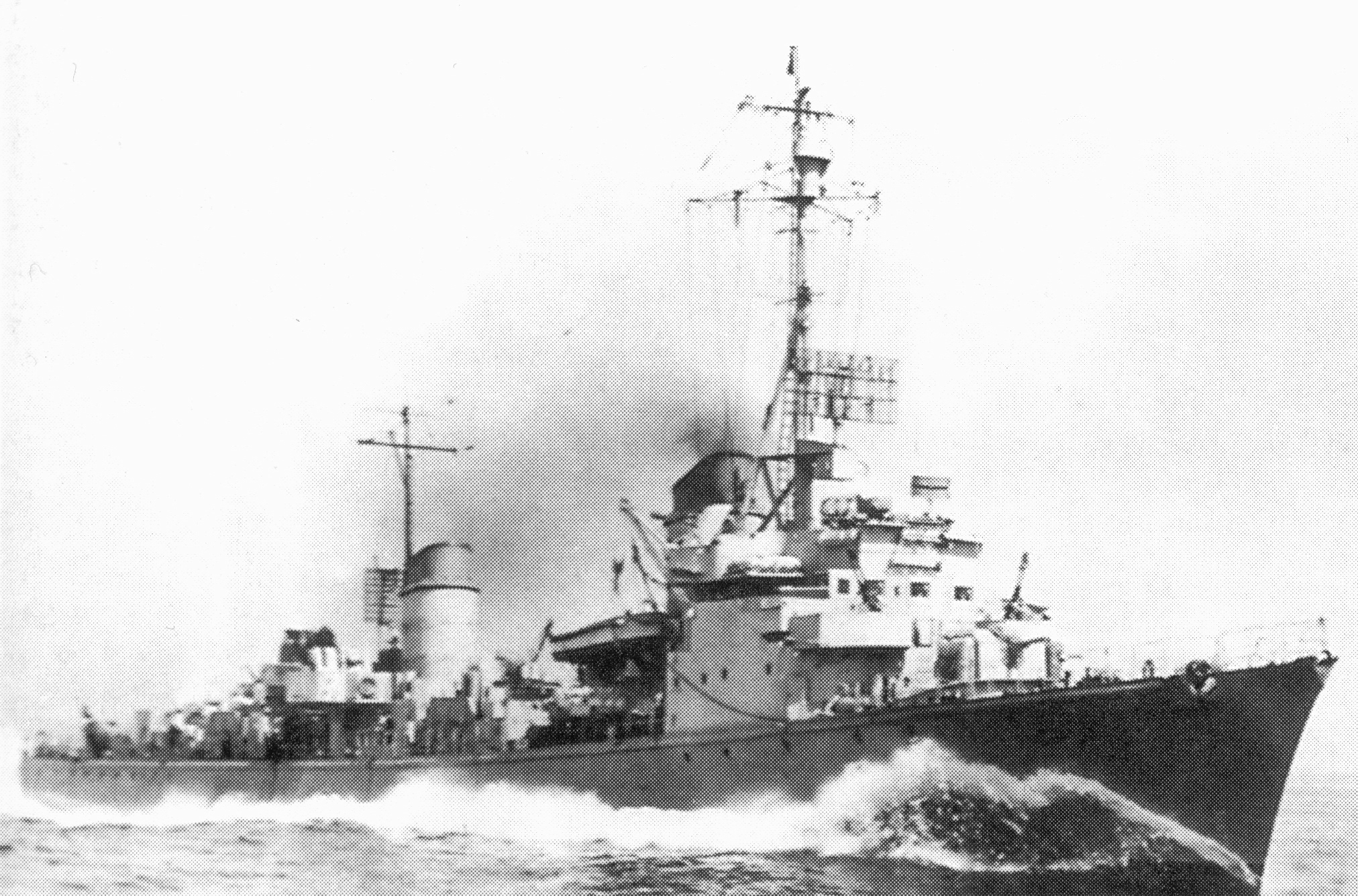
- Sister ship T35 in US service, August 1945

History

Nazi Germany
- Name: T22
- Ordered: 10 November 1939
- Builder: Schichau, Elbing, East Prussia
- Yard number: 1481
- Launched: 1941
- Completed: 28 February 1942
- Fate: Sunk by mine, 28 August 1944

General characteristics (as built)
- Class & type: Type 39 torpedo boat
- Displacement: 1,294 t (1,274 long tons) (standard); 1,754 t (1,726 long tons) (deep load)
- Length: 102.5 m (336 ft 3 in) o/a
- Beam: 10 m (32 ft 10 in)
- Draft: 3.22 m (10 ft 7 in)
- Installed power: 4 × water-tube boilers; 32,000 shp (24,000 kW)
- Propulsion: 2 × shafts; 2 × geared steam turbine sets
- Speed: 33.5 knots (62.0 km/h; 38.6 mph)
- Range: 2,400 nmi (4,400 km; 2,800 mi) at 19 knots (35 km/h; 22 mph)
- Complement: 206
- Sensors & processing systems: S-Gerät sonar; FuMO 21 radar
- Armament: 4 × single 10.5 cm (4.1 in) guns; 2 × twin 3.7 cm (1.5 in) AA guns; 1 × quadruple, 2 × single 2 cm (0.8 in) AA guns; 2 × triple 533 mm (21 in) torpedo tubes; 30–60 mines; 4 × depth charge launchers

The German torpedo boat T22 was one of fifteen Type 39 torpedo boats built for the Kriegsmarine (German Navy) during World War II. Completed in early 1942, the ship was transferred to France later that year where she escorted blockade runners and Axis submarines through the Bay of Biscay. T22 also laid minefields in the English Channel in mid-1943. She participated in the Battle of Sept-Îles, where she crippled a British destroyer, and the Battle of the Bay of Biscay later that year. After returning to Germany in early 1944, T22 struck a pair of mines in Narva Bay in August and blew up, with the loss of 143 men.

== Design and description ==
The Type 39 torpedo boat was conceived as a general-purpose design, much larger than preceding German torpedo boats. The ships had an overall length of 102.5 meters (336 ft 3 in) and were 97 meters (318 ft 3 in) long at the waterline. They had a beam of 10 meters (32 ft 10 in), a draft of 3.22 meters (10 ft 7 in) at deep load and displaced 1,294 metric tons (1,274 long tons) at standard load and 1,754 metric tons (1,726 long tons) at deep load. Their crew numbered 206 officers and sailors. The Type 39s were fitted with a pair of geared steam turbine sets, each driving one propeller, using steam from four high-pressure water-tube boilers. The turbines were designed to produce 32,000 shaft horsepower (24,000 kW) which was intended give the ships a maximum speed of 33.5 knots (62.0 km/h; 38.6 mph). They carried enough fuel oil to give them a range of 2,400 nautical miles (4,400 km; 2,800 mi) at 19 knots (35 km/h; 22 mph).

As built, the Type 39 ships mounted four 10.5 cm (4.1 in) SK C/32 guns in single mounts protected by gun shields; one forward of the superstructure, one between the funnels, and two aft, one superfiring over the other. Anti-aircraft defense was provided by four 3.7 cm (1.5 in) SK C/30 AA guns in two twin-gun mounts on platforms abaft the rear funnel, six 2 cm (0.8 in) C/38 guns in one quadruple mount on the aft superstructure and a pair of single mounts on the bridge wings. They carried six above-water 533 mm (21.0 in) torpedo tubes in two triple mounts amidships and could also carry 30 mines; the full complement of 60 mines made the ships top-heavy which could be dangerous in bad weather. For anti-submarine work the ships were fitted with a S-Gerät sonar and four depth charge launchers. The Type 39s were equipped with a FuMO 21 (Note: Funkmess-Ortung (Radio-direction finder, active ranging)) radar. In January–February 1944 the single 2 cm mounts in the bridge wings were replaced by quadruple mounts and FuMB7 (Note: Funkmess-Beobachtung (Passive radar detector).) "Naxos" and FuMB8 "Wanz G" radar detectors were installed.

== Construction and career ==
Originally ordered as a Type 37 torpedo boat on 30 March 1939, T22 was reordered on 10 November 1939 from Schichau. She was built at their Elbing, East Prussia, shipyard as yard number 1481, launched in 1941 and commissioned on 28 February 1942. While working up, the ship conducted training exercises in the Baltic with the battleship Scharnhorst, the light cruisers Leipzig and Nürnberg, the destroyers Z25, Z31 and Z37, and the torpedo boats T17, T20, T21, Falke and Kondor on 1–3 October. Later that month T22 was transferred to France. T22, her sister T23, and Falke and Kondor escorted the Italian blockade runner SS Cortellazzo from Bordeaux through the Bay of Biscay on 29–30 November. Another Italian blockade runner, Himalaya, escorted by T22, T23, Kondor and the torpedo boats T2 and T5, failed in her attempt to break through the Bay of Biscay when she was spotted by British aircraft and forced to return by heavy aerial attacks on 9–11 April 1943. On 5–8 May, the 2nd Torpedo Boat Flotilla with T22, T2, T5,T18 and T23 laid three minefields in the Channel. Now assigned to the 5th Torpedo Boat Flotilla, T22, Kondor, Falke, Greif and Möwe laid two more minefields in the Channel on 4–6 June.

The following month the ships returned to the Bay of Biscay to help escort U-boats through the Bay as part of the 4th Torpedo Boat Flotilla. On 2 August T22 and her sisters T24 and T25, responding to a distress call from another submarine, rescued survivors from the submarine U-106. From 29 to 31 August, the same three ships escorted the Japanese submarine I-8 through the Bay to Lorient. While providing distant cover for a small convoy during the night of 3/4 October, the 4th Flotilla spotted a force of five British destroyers off the Sept-Îles near the coast of Brittany in the Channel and attacked with complete surprise. The first volley of five torpedoes all missed, but the British did not see them and continued on their course. Only when T23 turned on her radar to determine the range for a second volley did they react when one of the British destroyers detected the radar; they altered course just in time for all six of T22's torpedoes to miss. Two of the British ships were able to pursue the retreating Germans at high speed, but both were damaged by German gunfire and forced to disengage.

=== Battle of Sept-Îles ===
On 22 October, the 4th Flotilla, now consisting of T22, T23, T25, and their sisters T26 and T27, sortied from Brest to provide cover for the unladen blockade runner Münsterland and her close escort from the 2nd Minesweeping Flotilla as they sailed up the Channel. The British were aware of Münsterland and attempted to intercept her on the night of the 23rd with a scratch force that consisted of the light cruiser Charybdis and the destroyers Grenville, Rocket, Limbourne, Wensleydale, Talybont and Stevenstone. T22's hydrophones detected the British ships off the Sept-Îles at 00:25 and Korvettenkapitän Franz Kohlauf maneuvered his flotilla to intercept them before they could reach Münsterland. Limbourne overheard the radio transmissions about 01:20 as the German ships turned and alerted the other British ships. At 01:36 Charybdis's radar detected the German torpedo boats at a range of 8,100 yards (7,400 m) and she fired star shells in an unsuccessful attempt to spot them visually. About this time, the Germans spotted Charybdis silhouetted against the lighter horizon and Kohlauf ordered every ship to fire all of their torpedoes. Two of these struck the cruiser, which sank shortly afterwards, and one of T22's torpedoes blew the bow off Limbourne, which had to be scuttled later. The loss of the flagship threw the British into confusion as they had not worked together before the attack, and the torpedo boats successfully disengaged before the senior surviving British captain realized that he was in command.

=== Battle of the Bay of Biscay ===
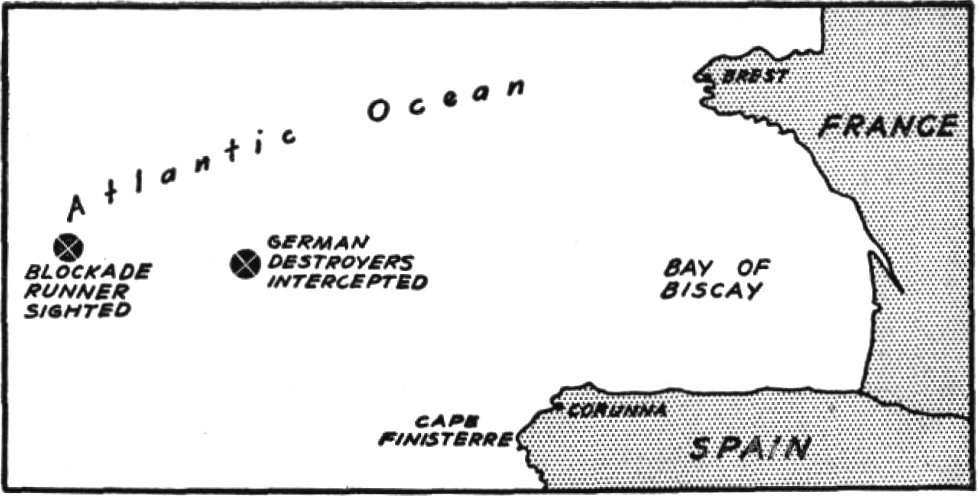
Map of the Battle of Biscay

On 24–26 December T22 was one of the escorts for the 6,951 GRT blockade runner MV Osorno through the Bay of Biscay. Another blockade runner, the 2,729 GRT refrigerated cargo ship MV Alsterufer, trailed Osorno by several days and four destroyers of the 8th Destroyer Flotilla and the six torpedo boats of the 4th Flotilla set sail on 27 December to escort her through the Bay. The Allies were aware of these blockade runners through their Ultra code-breaking efforts and positioned cruisers and aircraft in the Western Atlantic to intercept them in Operation Stonewall. A Consolidated B-24 Liberator heavy bomber from No. 311 Squadron RAF sank Alsterufer later that afternoon.

The German ships were unaware of the sinking until the following afternoon and continued onward to the rendezvous point. They had been spotted by an American Liberator bomber on the morning of the 28th and the British light cruisers Glasgow and Enterprise, which were assigned to Stonewall, maneuvered to intercept them. By this time, the weather had gotten significantly worse and the German ships were steaming for home, hampered by the rough seas that threw sea spray over their forward guns which made their operation difficult. It also severely reduced visibility and hampered the rangefinders and sights for the guns and torpedoes.

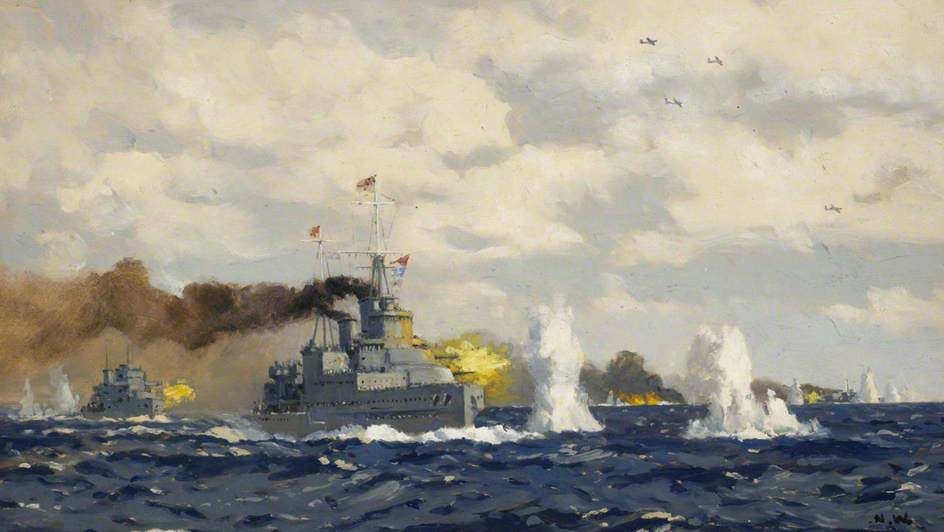
Battle of the Bay of Biscay 1943 – Painting by Norman Wilkinson

Using her radar, Glasgow was the first to open fire at 13:46 at a range of 19,600 meters (21,400 yd) with Enterprise following a few minutes later. At about that time, the torpedo boats began firing back with guns and torpedoes; the latter all missed but one hit was made on Glasgow's forward boiler room at 14:05, killing two sailors manning the port QF 2-pounder naval gun and wounding six others. Kapitän zur See (Captain) Hans Erdmenger, commander of the 8th Flotilla, decided to split his forces and ordered the destroyers Z23, Z27, and the torpedo boats T22, T25 and T26 to reverse course to the north at 14:18. The cruisers pursued them with Enterprise crippling Z27 and Glasgow doing the same to T25 and then T26. T22 attempted to close with T25 so she could take off the latter's crew and fired all of her torpedoes and guns at Glasgow at 14:58 in an attempt to drive the cruiser off, but all of the torpedoes missed and her gunfire was ineffective. Shell splashes from Glasgow surrounded T22 and she laid a smoke screen as she was forced to turn away. The ship later encountered Z23 and the two arrived at Saint-Jean-de-Luz, close to the Spanish border, later that day.

=== Loss ===
In early February 1944, T22 and T23 returned to Germany via the Channel and T22 began a refit at Elbing that lasted until June. The ship was then assigned to the 6th Torpedo Boat Flotilla operating in the Baltic. The flotilla, consisting of T22 and her sisters T30 and T32, was tasked to lay a minefield in Narva Bay, off the Estonian coast, on the night of 17/18 August. Reinforced by T23 from the 5th Torpedo Boat Flotilla, the ships loaded 54 mines each in Helsinki, Finland, and departed on the evening of the 17th. Shortly after midnight, they started to lay their mines, but had only just begun when T30 struck a pair of mines about 00:25 which knocked out all electrical power. About a minute after that, T32 also struck a pair of mines that blew her bow off and disabled her engines. At 00:30 T30 exploded and broke in half, probably after hitting another mine. T22 struck a pair of mines while maneuvering to go alongside T32 and blew up at around 01:14 with the loss of 143 men at 59°42′N 27°44′E.
