= German torpedo boat T24 =

German World War II torpedo boat

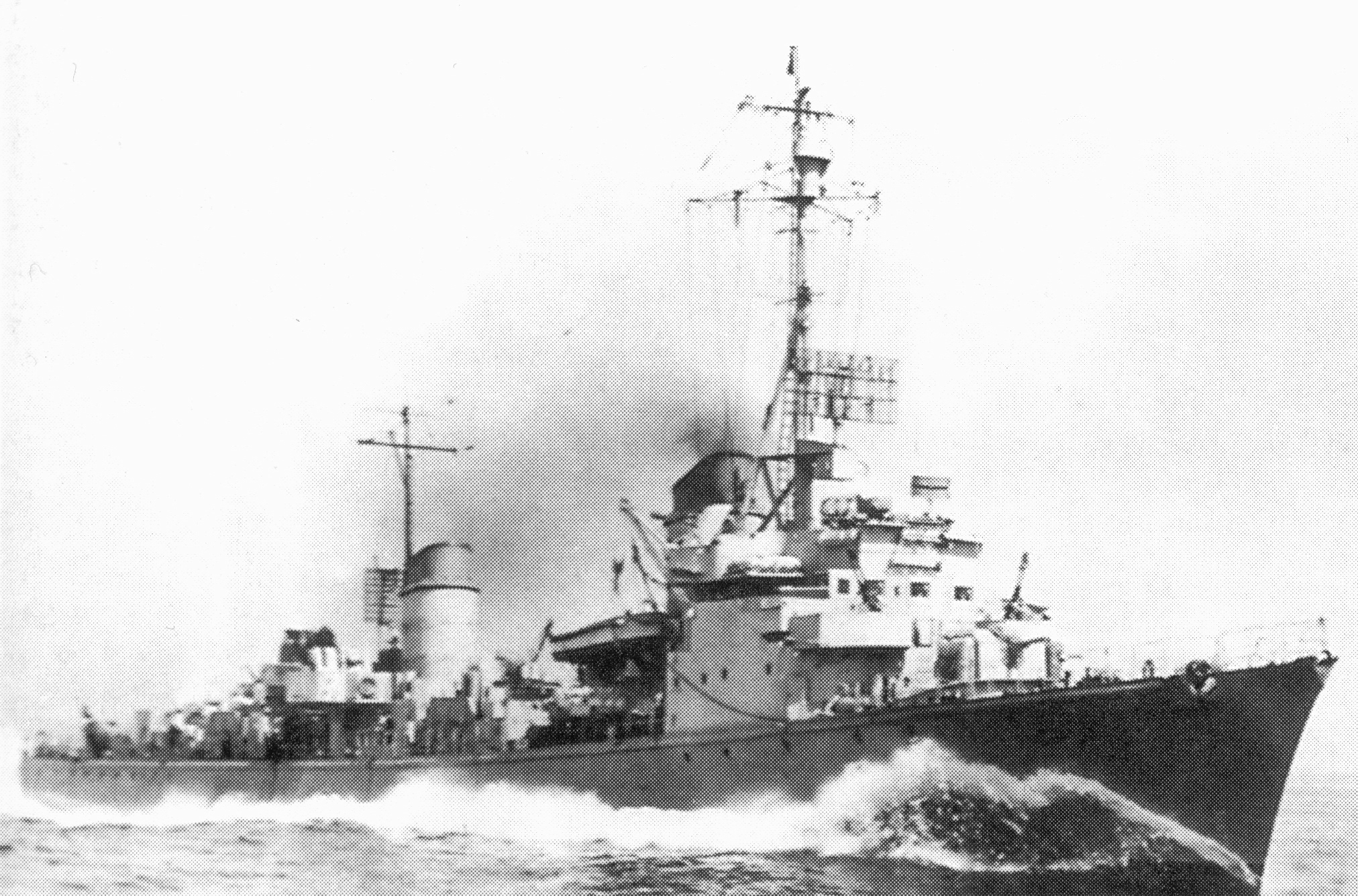
- Sister ship T35 in US service, August 1945

History

Nazi Germany
- Name: T24
- Ordered: 10 November 1939
- Builder: Schichau, Elbing, East Prussia
- Yard number: 1483
- Laid down: 21 September 1940
- Launched: 13 September 1941
- Completed: 17 October 1942
- Fate: Sunk by air attack, 24 August 1944

General characteristics (as built)
- Class & type: Type 39 torpedo boat
- Displacement: 1,294 t (1,274 long tons) (standard); 1,754 t (1,726 long tons) (deep load)
- Length: 102.5 m (336 ft 3 in) o/a
- Beam: 10 m (32 ft 10 in)
- Draft: 3.22 m (10 ft 7 in)
- Installed power: 4 × water-tube boilers; 32,000 shp (24,000 kW)
- Propulsion: 2 × shafts; 2 × geared steam turbine sets
- Speed: 33.5 knots (62.0 km/h; 38.6 mph)
- Range: 2,400 nmi (4,400 km; 2,800 mi) at 19 knots (35 km/h; 22 mph)
- Complement: 206
- Sensors & processing systems: S-Gerät sonar; FuMO 21 radar
- Armament: 4 × single 10.5 cm (4.1 in) guns; 2 × twin 3.7 cm (1.5 in) AA guns; 1 × quadruple, 2 × single 2 cm (0.8 in) AA guns; 2 × triple 533 mm (21 in) torpedo tubes; 30–60 mines; 4 × depth charge launchers

The German torpedo boat T24 was one of fifteen Type 39 torpedo boats built for the Kriegsmarine (German Navy) during World War II. Completed in 1942, the boat was briefly assigned to Norway in early 1943 before she was transferred to France in July. T24 was unsuccessfully attacked by Allied motor torpedo boats and aircraft during her voyage down the English Channel and then came to the aid of a convoy being attacked by Allied destroyers. Later that year she escorted blockade runners and Axis submarines through the Bay of Biscay. The boat played a minor role in the Battle of the Bay of Biscay and was lightly damaged during the action of 26 April 1944. During the subsequent battle, T24 sank a Canadian destroyer and was damaged when she later struck a mine. She played a minor role in the Battle of Ushant in June and was then damaged defending a convoy in August in the Bay of Biscay. T24 was sunk off the French coast later that month by Allied fighter-bombers.

== Design and description ==
The Type 39 torpedo boat was conceived as a general-purpose design, much larger than preceding German torpedo boats. The boats had an overall length of 102.5 meters (336 ft 3 in) and were 97 meters (318 ft 3 in) long at the waterline. They had a beam of 10 meters (32 ft 10 in), a draft of 3.22 meters (10 ft 7 in) at deep load and displaced 1,294 metric tons (1,274 long tons) at standard load and 1,754 metric tons (1,726 long tons) at deep load. Their crew numbered 206 officers and sailors. The Type 39s were fitted with a pair of geared steam turbine sets, each driving one propeller, using steam from four high-pressure water-tube boilers. The turbines were designed to produce 32,000 shaft horsepower (24,000 kW) which was intended give the ships a maximum speed of 33.5 knots (62.0 km/h; 38.6 mph). They carried enough fuel oil to give them a range of 2,400 nautical miles (4,400 km; 2,800 mi) at 19 knots (35 km/h; 22 mph).

As built, the Type 39 ships mounted four 10.5 cm (4.1 in) SK C/32 guns in single mounts protected by gun shields; one forward of the superstructure, one between the funnels, and two aft, one superfiring over the other. Anti-aircraft defense was provided by four 3.7 cm (1.5 in) SK C/30 AA guns in two twin-gun mounts on platforms abaft the rear funnel, six 2 cm (0.8 in) C/38 guns in one quadruple mount on the aft superstructure and a pair of single mounts on the bridge wings. They carried six above-water 533 mm (21.0 in) torpedo tubes in two triple mounts amidships and could also carry 30 mines; the full complement of 60 mines made the ships top-heavy which could be dangerous in bad weather. For anti-submarine work the boats were fitted with a S-Gerät sonar and four depth charge launchers. The Type 39s were equipped with a FuMO 21 (Note: Funkmess-Ortung (Radio-direction finder, active ranging)) radar. In January–February 1944 the single 2 cm mounts in the bridge wings were replaced by quadruple mounts and FuMB7 (Note: Funkmess-Beobachtung (Passive radar detector).) "Naxos" and FuMB8 "Wanz G" radar detectors were installed.

== Construction and career ==
Originally ordered as a Type 37 torpedo boat on 30 March 1939, T24 was reordered on 10 November 1939 from Schichau. The boat was laid down on 21 September 1940 at their Elbing, East Prussia, shipyard as yard number 1483, launched on 13 September 1941 and commissioned on 17 October 1942.

After working up until March 1943, she was briefly deployed to Norway for escort duties before returning to Germany for a brief refit at Kiel. On 3 July T24 and her sister T25 departed for Western France, via the English Channel. On the morning of 5 July, the sisters were unsuccessfully attacked by three Dutch-manned motor torpedo boats and shelled by British coastal artillery. After reaching Boulogne harbor, they were attacked by Hawker Typhoon fighters on 6 July which were equally unsuccessful. The boats sailed shortly after midnight on 7 July, bound for Le Havre where they arrived without being attacked. On the night of 9/10 July, on passage between Saint-Malo and Brest, they were tasked to provide distant cover for a convoy that was escorted by five minesweepers off Ushant. The convoy was attacked by the British destroyers Melbreak, Wensleydale and the Norwegian-manned Glaisdale which sank one of the minesweepers and damaged another before T24 and T25 could arrive. The sisters heavily damaged Melbreak before the Allied ships disengaged. Now assigned to the 4th Torpedo Boat Flotilla, the torpedo boats were tasked to help escort U-boats through the Bay. On 2 August T24, T25 and their sister T22, responding to a distress call from another submarine, rescued survivors from the submarine U-106. From 29 to 31 August, the same three boats escorted the Japanese submarine I-8 through the Bay to Lorient.

=== Battle of the Bay of Biscay ===
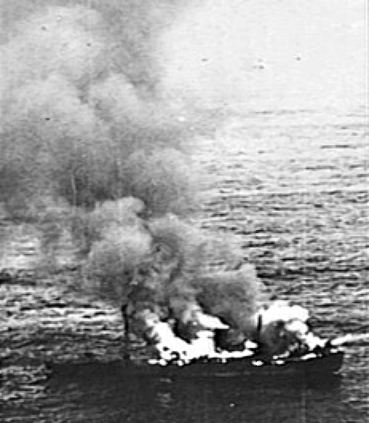
Alsterufer burning after a RAF attack

On 24–26 December T24 was one of the escorts for the 6,951 GRT blockade runner MV Osorno through the Bay of Biscay. Another blockade runner, the 2,729 GRT refrigerated cargo ship MV Alsterufer, trailed Osorno by several days and four destroyers of the 8th Destroyer Flotilla and the six torpedo boats of the 4th Flotilla set sail on 27 December to escort her through the bay. The Allies were aware of these blockade runners through their Ultra code-breaking efforts and positioned cruisers and aircraft in the Western Atlantic to intercept them in Operation Stonewall. A Consolidated B-24 Liberator heavy bomber from No. 311 Squadron RAF sank Alsterufer later that afternoon.

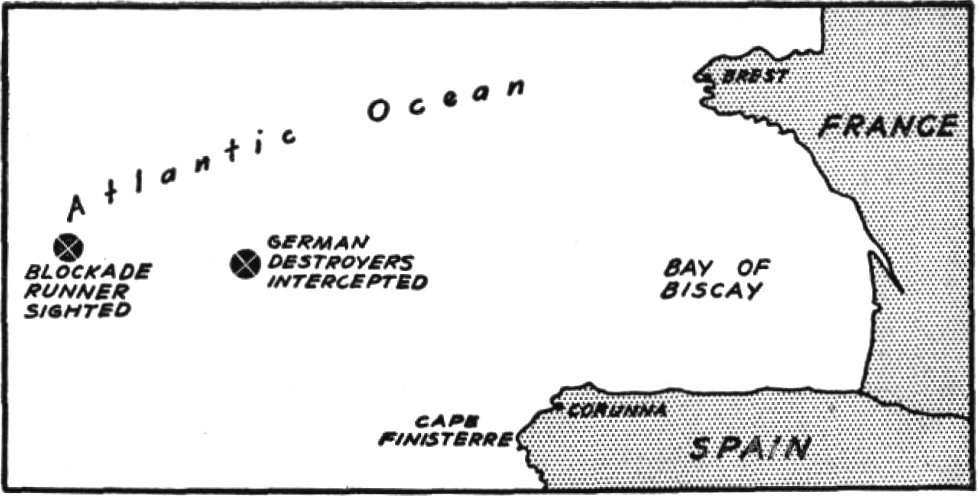
Map of the Battle of Biscay

The German ships were unaware of the sinking until the following afternoon and continued onward to the rendezvous point. They had been spotted by an American Liberator bomber on the morning of the 28th and the British light cruisers Glasgow and Enterprise, which were assigned to Stonewall, maneuvered to intercept them. By this time, the weather had gotten significantly worse and the German ships were steaming for home, hampered by the rough seas that threw spray over their forward guns which made them difficult to operate. In addition the spray severely reduced visibility and hampered the rangefinders and sights for the guns and torpedoes. Using her radar, Glasgow was the first to open fire at 13:46 at a range of 19,600 meters (21,400 yd) with Enterprise following a few minutes later. About that time, the destroyers began firing back with guns and torpedoes; the latter all missed and one hit was made on Glasgow at 14:05. Kapitän zur See Hans Erdmenger, commander of the 8th Flotilla, decided to split his forces and ordered the destroyers Z23, Z27, and T22, T25 and T26 to reverse course to the north at 14:18. The cruisers pursued the northern group and sank Z27, T25 and T26. All of the ships in the southern group, including T24, were able to successfully disengage.

=== Subsequent activities ===
On the night of 21/22 April 1944, the 4th Flotilla, now consisting of T24 and her sisters T27 and T29, transferred from Cherbourg to Saint-Malo. After laying a minefield off the Sept-Îles on the north coast of Brittany on the night of 25/26 April, the flotilla was engaged by an Allied force that consisted of the light cruiser HMS Black Prince and the destroyers HMS Ashanti, HMCS Athabaskan, HMCS Haida and HMCS Huron off the Île de Batz. The Allied ships were engaged by German coastal artillery without effect and Korvettenkapitän Franz Kohlauf, the flotilla's commander, headed west in search of the Allied ships, but the Germans were spotted first by Black Prince's radar at a range of 21,000 yards (19,000 m) at 02:07. They detected the Allied ships shortly afterwards and reversed course. The Allied ships were faster than the torpedo boats and had closed the range to 13,000 yards (12,000 m) by 02:20 when Black Prince began firing star shells. The destroyers began firing at T24 and T27 at a range of 9,000 yards (8,200 m) as Black Prince hung back in support until one of her forward turrets jammed. The Allied fire was accurate and one shell struck T27 at 02:31 and reduced her speed to 12 knots (22 km/h; 14 mph); Kohlauf ordered her into Morlaix Bay and the Allies lost her radar reflection amongst the rocks of the bay. T24 had fruitlessly fired her aft torpedo tubes at her pursuers and was then hit by two shells in her superstructure that started fires that were quickly doused. She fired her remaining torpedoes to no effect at 02:54 and, about that same time, a shell disabled T29's rudder. Ashanti and Huron concentrated on T29 while Haida and Athabaskan continued their pursuit of T24. They disengaged before T24 reached Saint-Malo, and returned to help sink T29.

After emergency repairs, T27 joined T24 in Saint-Malo during the night of 26/27 April. The sisters departed Saint-Malo bound for Brest on the night of 28/29 April and were spotted by British coastal radar. They were intercepted by Haida and Athabaskan off Île Vierge. Haida opened the engagement by firing a star shell at 04:12; the Germans laid a smoke screen in response and turned away. The sisters fired all of their torpedoes as they turned, T24 firing three off the wrong side of the boat, but one of the others hit Athabaskan. Shortly afterwards, she blew up, probably from a magazine explosion, and sank at 04:42. Haida pursued T27, badly damaging her. While maneuvering, T27 accidentally ran aground and the Canadian destroyer continued to engage until she started a large fire and then returned to the site where Athabaskan had sunk to rescue survivors. T24 and a pair of minesweepers failed in their attempt to pull T27 off and then T24 rescued 47 survivors from Athabaskan on the way to Brest. She struck a mine en route, but was only damaged. The 4th Torpedo Boat Flotilla was then disbanded and the boat was assigned to the 8th Destroyer Flotilla. After repairs, T24 was ordered to Cherbourg on 19 May, but struck another mine and was under repair for the next several weeks.

On the night of 8/9 June, the four ships of the 8th Flotilla set out from Brest for Cherbourg, but were intercepted by eight Allied destroyers of the 10th Destroyer Flotilla in the Battle of Ushant. The German ships had been spotted first and the British opened fire, with the Germans responding with a four-torpedo salvo from each destroyer that missed when the Allied ships turned to evade them; T24, the trailing ship in the formation, did not fire because she had no visible targets. The British fire was extremely effective, with Z24, immediately ahead of the torpedo boat, badly damaged only moments after firing her first salvo. The range was so close that both sides engaged with their 40 mm (1.6 in) or 3.7 cm anti-aircraft guns which appreciably added to the damaged suffered by Z24. The Allied ships hit the German destroyer five times before she was able to lay smoke and disengage, followed by T24. Haida and Huron pursued the pair until they passed over a British minefield and lost track of the German ships after the Canadian ships were forced to detour around it. After Haida and Huron broke off their pursuit, Z24 and T24 reversed course after hearing from the flotilla commander until they could see star shells bursting on the horizon and then Z24's captain received permission to return to Brest.

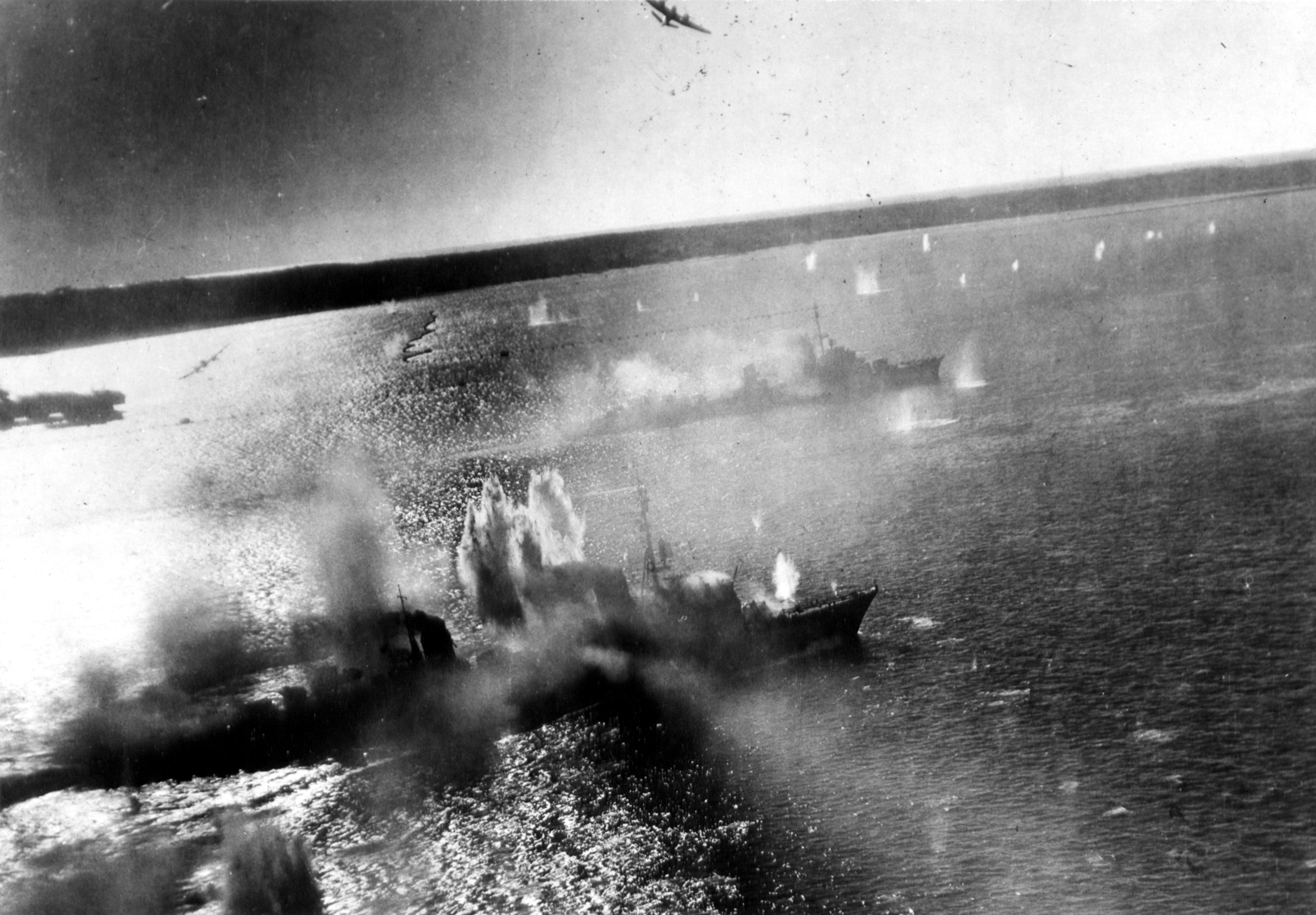
T24 (foreground) and Z24 under attack, 25 August

On the night of 14/15 August, T24, two minesweepers and Sperrbrecher 157 were escorting the aircraft repair ship Richthofen when they were attacked by the light cruiser HMS Mauritius and the destroyers HMS Ursa and HMCS Iroquois off Les Sables d'Olonne. The torpedo boat laid a smoke screen and near missed Iroquois with her torpedoes. She was hit once by Iroquois, but the Allied ships sank Sperrbrecher 157, set Richthofen on fire, badly damaged one minesweeper and forced the other one to beach herself. Iroquois was lightly damaged during the attack. Off Le Verdon-sur-Mer on 24 August, T24 and Z24 were attacked by rocket-firing Bristol Beaufighter fighter-bombers from No. 236 Squadron RAF and No. 404 Squadron RCAF. They sank T24 with the loss of 18 dead at 45°31′N 01°05′W and so severely damaged Z24 that she foundered the following day.
