= HMS Talybont =

Destroyer of the Royal Navy

History

United Kingdom
- Name: HMS Talybont
- Ordered: 23 August 1940
- Builder: J. Samuel White, Cowes
- Laid down: 28 November 1941
- Launched: 3 February 1943
- Commissioned: 19 May 1943
- Identification: Pennant number: L18
- Fate: Sold for scrap 1961

General characteristics
- Class & type: Type III Hunt-class escort destroyer
- Displacement: 1,050 long tons (1,067 t) standard, 1,490 long tons (1,514 t) full load
- Length: 264 ft 3 in (80.54 m) pp, 280 ft (85.34 m) oa
- Beam: 31 ft 6 in (9.60 m)
- Draught: 7 ft 9 in (2.36 m)
- Propulsion: 2 Admiralty 3-drum boilers; 2 shaft Parsons geared turbines, 19,000 shp (14,000 kW)
- Speed: 27 kn (50 km/h; 31 mph)
- Range: 3,700 nmi (6,900 km; 4,300 mi) at 14 kn (26 km/h; 16 mph)
- Complement: 168
- Armament: 4 × QF 4 in Mark XVI guns on twin mounts Mk. XIX; 5 × QF 2 pdr Mk. VIII (1 × quad mount and 1 × single bow chaser mount); 3 × 20 mm Oerlikons; 2 × 21 in (533 mm) torpedo tubes; 70 depth charges, 4 throwers, 2 racks

HMS Talybont was a Type III Hunt-class escort destroyer which served in the Royal Navy. She was launched in February 1943 and completed in May that year, serving for the rest of the Second World War. She took part in the Normandy Landings in June 1944, supporting the landings at Omaha Beach and the Pointe du Hoc. Post war she served in the Mediterranean before being reduced to reserve at the end of 1947. She was sold for scrap in 1961, with disposal completed by 1962.

== Construction ==
HMS Talybont was ordered for the Royal Navy from the shipbuilder J. Samuel White on 23 August 1940, one of 15 Type III Hunt-class destroyers ordered as part of the 1940 War Emergency Programme on that date. The Hunt class was meant to fill the Royal Navy's need for a large number of small destroyer-type vessels capable of both convoy escort and operations with the fleet. The Type III Hunts differed from the previous Type II ships in replacing a twin 4-inch gun mount by two torpedo tubes to improve their ability to operate as destroyers.

Talybont was laid down at White's Cowes, Isle of Wight shipyard on 28 November 1941. German air raids on the shipyard slowed construction of the ship, with Talybont not being launched until 3 February 1943 and commissioning on 19 May that year.

Talybont was 264 feet 3 inches (80.54 m) long between perpendiculars and 280 feet (85.34 m) overall. The ship's beam was 31 feet 6 inches (9.60 m) and draught 7 feet 9 inches (2.36 m). Displacement was 1,050 long tons (1,067 t) standard and 1,490 long tons (1,514 t) under full load. Two Admiralty boilers raising steam at 300 pounds per square inch (2,100 kPa) and 620 °F (327 °C) fed Parsons single-reduction geared steam turbines that drove two propeller shafts, generating 19,000 shaft horsepower (14,000 kW) at 380 rpm. This gave a speed of 27 knots (50 km/h; 31 mph). 345 long tons (351 t) of oil fuel were carried, giving a range of 3,700 nautical miles (6,900 km; 4,300 mi) at 15 knots (28 km/h; 17 mph).

Main gun armament was four 4 inch (102 mm) QF Mk XVI dual purpose (anti-ship and anti-aircraft) guns in two twin mounts, with a quadruple 2-pounder "pom-pom" and three Oerlikon 20 mm cannon providing close-in anti-aircraft fire. The ship's anti-aircraft armament may have been supplemented by two Bofors 40 mm guns. (Note: Lenton says that Talybont had this modification, while Friedman and Conway's do not list Taybont as fitted with these guns.) Two 21-inch (533 mm) torpedo tubes were fitted in a single twin mount, while two depth charge chutes, four depth charge throwers and 70 depth charges comprised the ship's anti-submarine armament. Type 291 and Type 285 radars was fitted, as was Type 128 sonar.

== Service ==
Talybont commissioned with the pennant number L18, and after work-up was allocated to the 15th Destroyer Flotilla based at Devonport, joining the Flotilla on 12 July 1943. On 22 October 1943, Talybont, together with sister ships Limbourne, Stevenstone and Wensleydale, the destroyers Grenville and Rocket and the light cruiser Charybdis set out from Plymouth to intercept the German blockade runner Münsterland. Early on 23 October the British force encountered a force of German torpedo boats of the 4th Torpedo Boat Flotilla (T22, T23, T25, T26 and T27). In the resulting confrontation, T23 and T27 torpedoed and sank Charybdis, while T22 torpedoed Limbourne, blowing off much of the front of the ship. Attempts by Talybont to take Limbourne under tow failed, and the badly damaged escort destroyer was scuttled by torpedoes from Talybont and shellfire from Rocket. Talybont collided with a merchant ship on 2 December 1943 and was under repair for a month.

On 5 February 1944, Talybont, Brissenden, Tanatside and Wensleydale engaged the T29 and the minesweepers M156 and M206 off the coast of Brittany. M156 was badly damaged and was then sunk the next day by British Hawker Typhoon fighter-bombers of No. 266 Squadron RAF at Aber Wrac'h. The Allied invasion of Normandy in June 1944 saw Talybont assigned to the support forces for the American landings at Omaha Beach. On the morning of 6 June she and the American destroyer Satterlee provided artillery support for an assault by US Rangers at Pointe du Hoc which had the aim of knocking out a German coastal artillery position. Talybont and Satterlee operated at close range (within 1 mile (1.6 km), with Talybont at one stage using her pom-poms against German machine gun positions) to support the landings. Talybont operated in support of the Rangers at Pont du Hoc from 05:30 hr to 07:10 hr. On 17 June Talybont was on patrol off Cherbourg when she was damaged by a near miss from German shore batteries (claimed to be from a 170 mm shell) rupturing a steam pipe and knocking out a boiler room. She was under repair for six days. On 25 June she was released to convoy escort duties in the English Channel. On the night of 23/24 August 1944, Talybont, together with the Frigate Thornborough and Motor torpedo boats MTB 692, MTB 694 and MTB 695 intercepted a force of German light craft evacuating from Le Havre. The German motor minesweeper (or R-boat) R229 and patrol boat V716 were damaged.

Talybont transferred to the 16th Destroyer Flotilla based at Harwich for operations in the North Sea in October 1944. On 9 November 1944 she was in collision with a merchant ship and was holed on the port side aft. She was under repair for two months before returning to patrol and escort duties. The end of the war in Europe in May 1945 resulted in Talybont being allocated for service in the Far East. She was refitted at Malta from July 1945 to prepare her for service in the Pacific, and was still under refit when VJ-Day signalled the end of the war.

=== Post war service ===
On completion of the refit, Talybont joined the Mediterranean Fleet, (Note: Either as part of the 3rd Destroyer Flotilla or the 6th Flotilla.) and patrolled off the coast of Palestine to stop ships carrying illegal Jewish migrants. On 26 June 1946, Talybont, together with the destroyer Venus intercepted the steamer Josiah Wedgewood, formerly the Canadian corvette Beauharnois, carrying 1250 Jewish refugees. On 19 January 1947 Talybont collided with a wreck in Haifa harbour, and was under repair at Malta until May that year.

She was reduced to reserve at Portsmouth by the end of 1947, and remained in reserve at various ports around the British Isles for the rest of her career. She was used as a harbour training ship at Rosyth between 1958 and 1960. On 14 February 1961 she arrived at Charlestown for breaking up, with scrapping complete by 3 May 1962, with a scrap value of £19,950.

== Publications ==
- Colledge, J. J.; Warlow, Ben (2006) [1969]. Ships of the Royal Navy: The Complete Record of All Fighting Ships of the Royal Navy from the 15th Century to the Present (3rd Rev ed.). London: Chatham Publishing. ISBN 978-1-86176-281-8. OCLC 67375475.
- Critchley, Mike (1982). British Warships Since 1945: Part 3: Destroyers. Liskeard, UK: Maritime Books. ISBN 0-9506323-9-2.
- H.M. Ships Damaged or Sunk by Enemy Action: 3rd. SEPT. 1939 to 2nd. SEPT. 1945 (PDF). Admiralty. 1952. Archived from the original (PDF) on 10 June 2016.
- English, John (1987). The Hunts: a history of the design, development and careers of the 86 destroyers of this class built for the Royal and Allied Navies during World War II. Kendal, UK: World Ship Society. ISBN 0-905617-44-4.
- Friedman, Norman (2008). British Destroyers and Frigates: The Second World War and After. Barnsley, UK: Seaforth Publishing. ISBN 978-1-84832-015-4.
- Gardiner, Robert; Chesneau, Roger, eds. (1980). Conway's All The World's Fighting Ships 1922–1946. London: Conway Maritime Press. ISBN 0-85177-146-7.
- Greenfield, Murray S.; Hochstein, Joseph M. (2010). The Jew's Secret Fleet: The Untold Story of North American Volunteers who Smashed the British Blockade of Palestine. Jerusalem: Gefen Publishing. ISBN 978-965-229-517-0.
- Gröner, Erich; Jung, Dieter; Maass, Martin (1983). Die deutschen Kriegsschiffe 1815–1945: Band 2: Torpedoboote, Zerstörer, Schnellboote, Minensuchboote, Minenräumboote (in German). Koblenz: Bernard & Graef Verlag. ISBN 3-7637-4801-6.
- Lenton, H.T. (1970). Navies of the Second World War: British Fleet & Escort Destroyers Volume Two. London: Macdonald & Co. ISBN 0-356-03122-5.
- Lenton, H. T.; Colledge, J. J. (1973). Warships of World War II (Second ed.). London: Ian Allan. ISBN 0-7110-0403-X.
- Rohwer, Jürgen; Hümmelchen, Gerhard (1992). Chronology of the War at Sea 1939–1945. London: Greenhill Books. ISBN 1-85367-117-7.
- Roskill, S. W. (1960). The War at Sea 1939–1945: Volume III: The Offensive: Part I: 1st June 1943–31st May 1944. History of the Second World War: United Kingdom Military Series. London: Her Majesty's Stationery Office.
- Sterne, Gary (2013). The Cover Up at Omaha Beach: Maisy Battery and the US Rangers. Barnsley, UK: Pen & Sword Books. ISBN 978-1-84884-489-6.
- Whitley, M.J. (2000). Destroyers of World War Two: An International Encyclopedia. London: Cassell & Co. ISBN 1-85409-521-8.
