= R97 =

R97 may refer to:

- French aircraft carrier Bois Belleau (R97)
- French cruiser Jeanne d'Arc (R97)
- HMS Grenville (R97), a destroyer of the Royal Navy
- HMS Leviathan (R97), an aircraft carrier ordered for the Royal Navy but never completed
