= Battle of Sept-Îles =

Naval battle during the Second World War

- Part of the Battle of the Atlantic of World War II
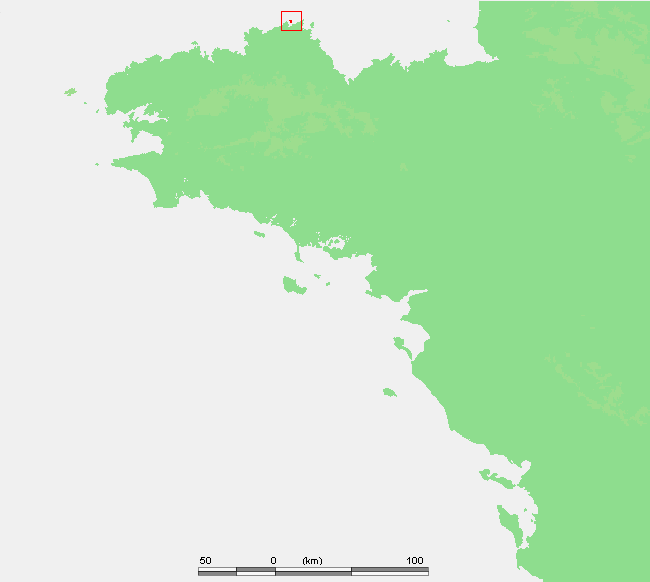
- Location of Sept-Îles, Brittany
Date	22–23 October 1943
Location	off the Sept-Îles, France 48°53′00″N 03°28′00″W
Result	German victory

Belligerents
United Kingdom	Germany

Commanders and leaders
(United Kingdom) George Voelcker †	(Nazi Germany) Franz Kohlauf

Strength
1 light cruiser 6 destroyers	6 minesweepers 5 torpedo boats 1 blockade runner

Casualties and losses
508 killed, drowned or died of wounds 1 light cruiser sunk 1 destroyer scuttled	none

The Battle of Sept-Îles was a naval action fought on the night of 22/23 October 1943 during World War II as part of the Battle of the Atlantic. The battle took place off the Sept-Îles near the French coast in the English Channel between a light cruiser and six destroyers of the British Royal Navy, hoping to intercept a German blockade runner, which was accompanied by German torpedo-boat destroyer flotillas of the Kriegsmarine. It is likely that the British vessels were caught in an ambush and the action ended with the sinking of HMS Charybdis and the scuttling of the Hunt-class destroyer Limbourne after suffering damage; over 500 British sailors lost their lives. The battle was the last surface fleet action of the war where the Royal Navy was defeated and the last German surface fleet action victory.

== Background ==
By mid-1943, the Battle of The Atlantic had been won and the Royal Navy went on the offensive. In August 1943, Plymouth Command was ordered to develop an operation to regularly harry German shipping, with a secondary aim of drawing German naval resources into a fight to destroy as many of the warships as possible before invading France.

C-in-C Plymouth, Vice-Admiral Ralph Leatham, devised Operation Tunnel, an offensive sweep along the coast of western France, the first being on the night of 5/6 September. Three more followed with no result. On the night of 3/4 October, Hunt-class escort destroyers HMS Limbourne, Tanatside and Wensleydale and the fleet destroyers HMS Grenville and Ulster exchanged fire with German 'Elbing'-type torpedo-boat destroyers T-22, T-23, T-25, T-27, with Grenville and Ulster suffering light structural damage. Four more Tunnels were run between 13 and 18 October. The British tactics became predictable.

On 22 October, British authorities gained intelligence about the movement of the German blockade runner, Münsterland, which had departed Brest and was carrying an important cargo of latex and strategic metals. In all likelihood, the Münsterland intelligence was a ruse to lure the British into an ambush. At the briefing Lieutenant Commander Roger Hill commanding the Grenville voiced his reservations to senior staff about the predictability of the tactics and the lack of training between the vessels, going so far as to say "don't let's go" but his advice was not heeded.

HMS Charybdis was assigned to the operation for the first time, with its skipper Captain George Voelcker in charge and on 22 October the British force put to sea from Plymouth. With Charybdis were the fleet destroyers HMS Grenville and Rocket and four Hunt-class destroyers, Limbourne, Wensleydale, Talybont and Stevenstone.

Six German minesweepers of the 2nd Flotilla and two radar-equipped patrol boats escorted Münsterland in a well-rehearsed procedure. The blockade runner was then joined by five Type 39 torpedo boats of the 4th Torpedo Boat Flotilla, commanded by Franz Kohlauf.

Soon after midnight the British force conducted a radar sweep at 13 kn (24 km/h; 15 mph) while 7 nmi (13 km; 8.1 mi) west of Brittany. At the same time German radar operators picked them up, tracked them and relayed the information to the German ships. These warnings were intercepted by the Hunt destroyers and by Plymouth Command but Charybdis for some reason did not pick them up.

== Contact ==
Münsterland was turned back out of harm's way, while the German torpedo-boats lay in wait for the British force. Charybdis picked them up on her own radar at a range of 14,000 yd (13,000 m) at 01:30 and signalled the destroyers to increase speed but only the rear destroyer, Wensleydale, picked up the signal. Her overtaking the rest of the force caused confusion, compounded when the first German torpedoes arrived and friendly star shells illuminated the leading British ships instead of the Germans. By now the British formation had lost cohesion.

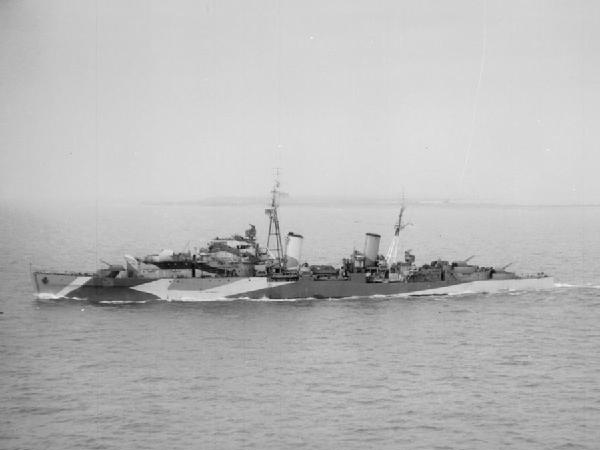
The British cruiser HMS Charybdis underway

The British force was visible against the lighter horizon and the Germans were further aided by a rain squall approaching from the south-west. Visibility was poor with low clouds and there was a long heavy swell. Kohlauf saw the silhouette of the larger British cruiser and believing he had been surprised gave the immediate order to turn and flee but not before ordering every ship to launch their torpedoes.

Charybdis could have inflicted considerable damage but the Germans had only been confirmed on radar with no visual contact. A total of 24 torpedoes were launched by the Germans. Lookouts suddenly saw the white, straight foaming tracks of torpedoes and before anything could be done Charybdis was hit on the port side by T23 (Friedrich-Karl Paul), flooding No 2 dynamo room and B boiler room. The port electrical ring main failed and she listed twenty degrees to port and stopped. Torpedoes narrowly missed Wensleydale and Grenville and then a second torpedo from T27 struck Charybdis. This time the aft engine room was hit which flooded and cut all electrical power and increased the list to fifty degrees.

Within minutes of the second torpedo hit on Charybdis, T22 scored a hit on Limbourne exploding the forward magazine. She listed heavily to starboard with her bows blown off; the crew subsequently abandoned ship. Charybdis sank within half an hour with the loss 462 men including her captain George Voelcker. The other destroyers had near misses from collisions in the confusion and then withdrew, ending the battle.

== Aftermath ==
The British force, now under command of Roger Hill of Grenville, only came back when they learned of Limbourne's crippling and then conducted a rescue operation; 107 of the crew of Charybdis were recovered through the morning and day. Limbourne had lost 39 members of her crew. Four of eight American artillerymen of 110th Field Artillery on detachment aboard were also killed. An attempt to tow Limbourne failed and the order was given for her to be scuttled. She was sunk by torpedoes from Talybont and surface gunfire from Rocket; 100 survivors were picked up. Three more British crews of Limbourne died from their wounds in the next days, bringing her death toll to 46.

Franz Kohlauf was awarded the Knight's Cross for this action by Adolf Hitler soon after, while Friedrich-Karl Paul was awarded the German Cross. The action was the last defeat of the Royal Navy. Lessons were learned by the British and despite the setback Operation Tunnel succeeded, with only four out of 15 blockade runners reaching France. Münsterland returned to port in Saint-Malo unscathed but the blockade running mission had been frustrated. On the next attempt, she was forced ashore and destroyed west of Cap Blanc Nez by fire from British coastal artillery at Dover, on 21 January 1944.

== Legacy ==
The bodies of 21 Royal Navy and Royal Marine personnel were washed up in Guernsey. The German occupation authorities buried them with full military honours. The funerals became an opportunity for some of the islanders to demonstrate their loyalty to Britain and their opposition to the Nazi occupiers. Around 5,000 islanders attended the funeral, laying some 900 wreaths, enough of a demonstration against the Nazi occupation for subsequent military funerals to be closed to civilians.

Every year a commemoration service is held, which is attended by survivors of the action and their relatives, the Guernsey Association of Royal Navy and Royal Marines, Sea Cadets, St John's Ambulance Brigade, the Police and the Red Cross and representatives of the Royal Navy.

The senior surviving Royal Navy officer of this battle and captain of HMS Grenville, Lt. Cmdr. Roger Hill, wrote a detailed narrative of the battle in his autobiography Destroyer Captain, which includes his further investigations and also information from a German destroyer captain present that night. He discusses the planning, the events of the operation and its aftermath, identifying some of the salient oversights that culminated in the loss of both Charybdis and Limbourne.
