= HMS Limbourne =

Destroyer of the Royal Navy

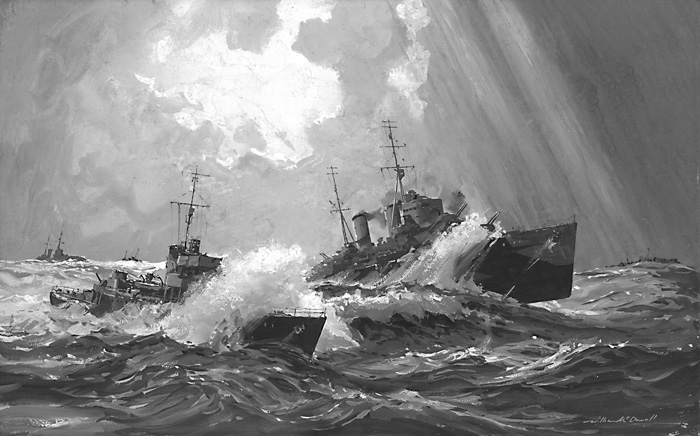
- Painting by William McDowell of Limbourne (left) with Charybdis (right) in an English Channel gale

History

United Kingdom
- Name: Limbourne
- Ordered: 4 July 1940
- Builder: Alexander Stephen and Sons, Glasgow
- Laid down: 8 April 1941
- Launched: 12 May 1942
- Commissioned: 24 October 1942
- Identification: Pennant number: L57
- Fate: Sunk 23 October 1943

General characteristics
- Class & type: Type III Hunt-class destroyer
- Displacement: 1,050 long tons (1,070 t) standard, 1,490 long tons (1,510 t) full load
- Length: 264 ft 3 in (80.54 m) pp, 280 ft (85.34 m) oa
- Beam: 31 ft 6 in (9.60 m)
- Draught: 7 ft 9 in (2.36 m)
- Propulsion: 2 Admiralty 3-drum boilers; 2 shaft Parsons geared turbines, 19,000 shp (14,000 kW)
- Speed: 27 knots (50 km/h; 31 mph)
- Range: 3,700 nmi (6,900 km; 4,300 mi) at 14 knots (26 km/h; 16 mph)
- Complement: 168
- Armament: 4 × QF 4 in Mark XVI guns on twin mounts Mk. XIX; 5 × QF 2 pdr Mk. VIII (1 × quad mount and 1 × single bow chaser mount); 3 × 20 mm Oerlikons; 2 × 21 in (533 mm) torpedo tubes; 70 depth charges, 4 throwers, 2 racks

HMS Limbourne (L57) was a Hunt-class escort destroyer, operated by the Royal Navy. She was sunk in action, off German-occupied Guernsey, on 23 October 1943.

== Design ==
Limbourne was one of seven Type III Hunt-class destroyers ordered for the Royal Navy on 4 July 1940, as part of the 1940 War Emergency Programme. The Hunt class was meant to fill the Royal Navy's need for a large number of small destroyer-type vessels capable of both convoy escort and operations with the fleet. The Type III Hunts differed from the previous Type II ships in replacing a twin 4-inch gun mount by two torpedo tubes to improve their ability to operate as destroyers.

The Type III Hunts were 264 feet 3 inches (80.54 m) long between perpendiculars and 280 feet (85.34 m) overall, with a beam of 31 feet 6 inches (9.60 m) and draught 7 feet 9 inches (2.36 m). Displacement was 1,050 long tons (1,070 t) standard and 1,490 long tons (1,510 t) under full load. Two Admiralty boilers raising steam at 300 pounds per square inch (2,100 kPa) and 620 °F (327 °C) fed Parsons single-reduction geared steam turbines that drove two propeller shafts, generating 19,000 shaft horsepower (14,000 kW) at 380 rpm. This gave a design maximum speed of 27 knots (50 km/h; 31 mph). 345 long tons (351 t) of oil fuel were carried, giving a range of 3,700 nautical miles (6,900 km; 4,300 mi) at 15 knots (28 km/h; 17 mph).

Main gun armament was four 4 inch (102 mm) QF Mk XVI dual purpose (anti-ship and anti-aircraft) guns in two twin mounts, with a quadruple 2-pounder "pom-pom" and three Oerlikon 20 mm cannon providing close-in anti-aircraft fire. Two 21-inch (533 mm) torpedo tubes were fitted in a single twin mount, while two depth charge chutes, four depth charge throwers and 70 depth charges comprised the ship's anti-submarine armament. Type 291 and Type 285 radars were fitted, as was Type 128 sonar.

== Construction and service ==
Limbourne was laid down at Alexander Stephen and Sons' shipyard at Linthouse, Glasgow on 8 April 1941. She was launched on 12 May 1942, and was completed on 24 October 1942.

After commissioning, Limbourne spent November in sea trials and work up with the Home Fleet at Scapa Flow, interrupting work up to escort the battleship Howe out to Gibraltar and the aircraft carrier Victorious and battleship Duke of York back to the UK from the Mediterranean Sea following the Anglo-American landings in North Africa. After completing workup, she joined the 15th Destroyer Flotilla based at Devonport.

In January and February 1943 Limbourne escorted convoys between the UK and Gibraltar, while in March, the ship was under repair at Portsmouth, with a propeller being replaced. Following the completion of these repairs, Limbourne was deployed on escort and anti-submarine patrol duties in the Western Approaches and the Bay of Biscay, together with operations against German convoys in the English Channel. On the night of 3/4 October 1943, Limbourne, together with Talybont, Wensleydale and the destroyers Grenville and Ulster, was on patrol off the coast of Brittany when they encountered five German torpedo boats (T22, T23, T25, T26 and T27). In the resulting exchange of fire, Limbourne was hit by a German shell and sustained slight damage.

=== Loss ===
On 23 October Limbourne was sailing with the light cruiser HMS Charybdis and five other destroyers, when they were engaged by a number of large German Type 39 torpedo boats. Both ships were hit by torpedoes. T22 scored a hit on Limbourne exploding the forward magazine. 39 crewmembers of Limbourne were killed along with four of the eight American artillerymen of 110th Field Artillery Battalion on detachment aboard. Attempts were made to tow her back to port, for repairs. The tow attempts had to be abandoned, and she was scuttled. In the next days three more British sailors died of their wounds, bring the total of dead to 46.

In 2011 the BBC News reported that "The incident was used as an illustration of what not to do by the Royal Navy tactical school." They reported that the Royal Navy ships were sunk by a smaller but better trained German force.
