= HMS Melbreak =

Destroyer of the Royal Navy

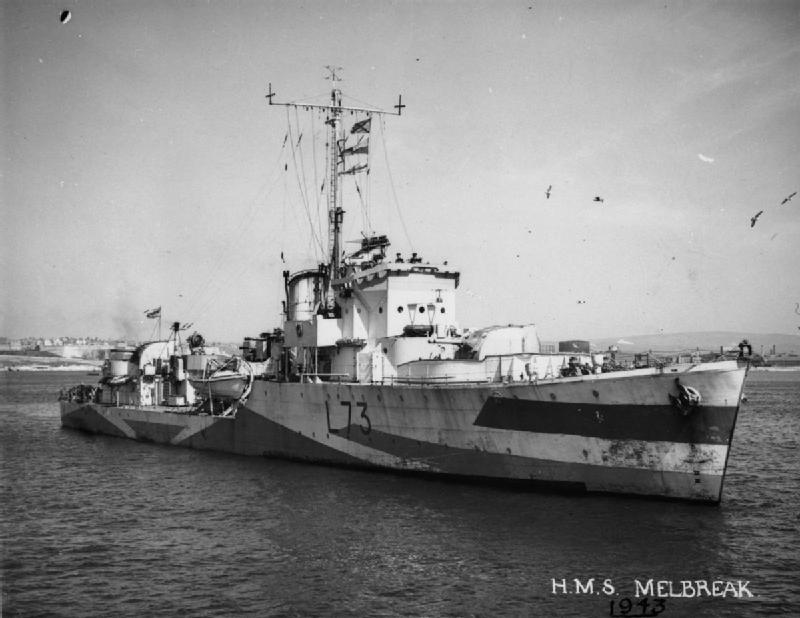
- Melbreak underway in Plymouth Sound, 1943 (IWM)

History

United Kingdom
- Name: HMS Melbreak
- Ordered: 28 July 1940
- Builder: J. Samuel White, East Cowes, Isle of Wight
- Laid down: 23 June 1941
- Launched: 5 March 1942
- Commissioned: 10 October 1942
- Honours and awards: Normandy 1944; Atlantic 1944–45; English Channel 1943–44; North Sea 1945
- Fate: Scrapped in 1956
- Badge: On a Field Red a sun in splendour Gold, pierced by a broken spear erect Block.

General characteristics
- Class & type: Hunt-class destroyer
- Displacement: 1,050 long tons (1,070 t) standard; 1,435 long tons (1,458 t) full load
- Length: 85.3 m (279 ft 10 in) o/a
- Beam: 10.16 m (33 ft 4 in)
- Draught: 3.51 m (11 ft 6 in)
- Propulsion: 2 Admiralty 3-drum boilers; 2 shaft Parsons geared turbines, 19,000 shp (14,000 kW)
- Speed: 27 knots (31 mph; 50 km/h); 25.5 kn (29.3 mph; 47.2 km/h) full
- Range: 2,350 nmi (4,350 km) at 20 kn (37 km/h)
- Complement: 168
- Armament: 4 × QF 4-inch (102 mm) Mark XVI guns on twin mounts Mk. XIX; 4 × QF 2-pounder (40 mm) Mk. VIII AA guns on quad mount MK.VII; 2 × 20 mm Oerlikon AA guns on single mounts P Mk. III; 2 × 21-inch (533 mm) torpedo tubes; 110 depth charges, 4 throwers, 3 racks

HMS Melbreak was a Hunt-class destroyer of the Royal Navy. She was a member of the third subgroup of the class, and saw service in the Second World War. All the ships of this class were named after British fox hunts. She was the first Royal Navy warship with this name, after the Melbreak hunt in Cumbria. In 1942 she was adopted by the civil community of Cockermouth in Cumberland, as part of Warship Week.

== Service history ==
On commissioning Melbreak served in the English Channel, but in 1943 she was deployed to the Mediterranean. In 1944 she served mostly in the English Channel and was part of the escort force for the assault and landings in Normandy, as part of the D-Day operations.

On 28 August 1944 she was attacked in the English Channel by an unknown aircraft, causing 20 casualties including five killed. She was subsequently repaired in Barry, South Wales.

On 7 May 1945 Melbreak suffered considerable damage on grounding and was repaired at Sheerness. She was subsequently placed in reserve at Chatham. She was in attendance at the Coronation Fleet Review in Portsmouth in 1953.

She was subsequently sold for scrap to Thos. W. Ward and arrived at their ship breaking yard in Grays on 22 November 1956.

== Sources ==
- Colledge, J. J. & Warlow, Ben, Ships of the Royal Navy: The Complete Record of all Fighting Ships of the Royal Navy from the 15th Century to the Present, Newbury, 2010
- English, John, The Hunts – A history of the design, development and careers of the 86 destroyers of this class built for the Royal and Allied Navies during World War II, Cumbria, 1987 (World Ship Society)
- Whitley, M. J., Destroyers of World War Two – an international encyclopedia, London, 1988
- Gardiner, Robert (ed.), Conway's All the World's Fighting Ships 1922–1946, London, 1987
