= HMS Wensleydale =

Destroyer of the Royal Navy

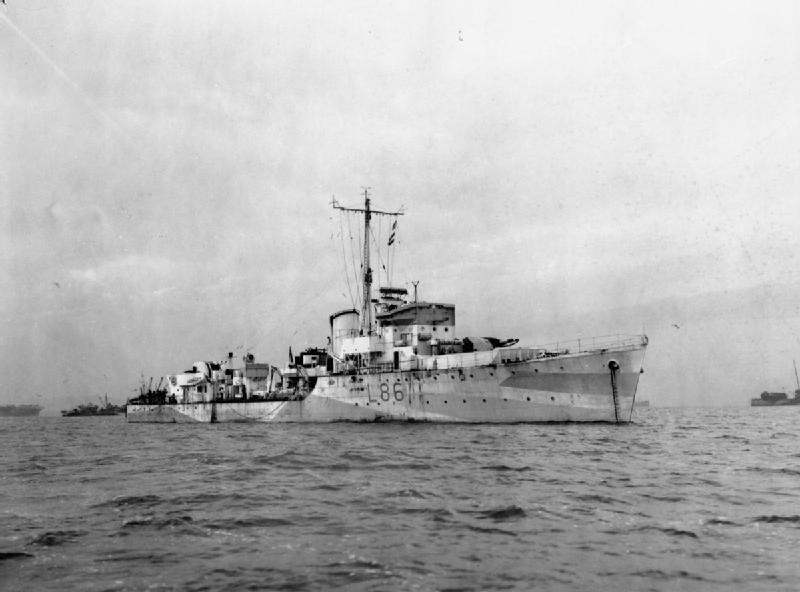
- Forward oblique view of Wensleydale

History

United Kingdom
- Name: Wensleydale
- Ordered: 23 August 1940
- Builder: Yarrow Shipbuilders, Scotstoun, Glasgow
- Laid down: 28 July 1941
- Launched: 20 June 1942
- Commissioned: 20 October 1942
- Fate: Declared beyond economical repair on 11 December 1944

General characteristics
- Class & type: Hunt-class destroyer
- Displacement: 1,050 long tons (1,070 t) (standard)
- Length: 280 ft (85.3 m) (o/a)
- Beam: 31 ft 6 in (9.6 m)
- Draught: 12 ft 3 in (3.7 m)
- Installed power: 2 Admiralty 3-drum boilers; 19,000 shp (14,000 kW)
- Propulsion: 2 shafts; geared steam turbines
- Speed: 27 knots (50 km/h; 31 mph)
- Range: 2,350 nmi (4,350 km; 2,700 mi) at 20 knots (37 km/h; 23 mph)
- Complement: 168
- Sensors & processing systems: Type 291 search radar; Type 285 gunnery radar; Type 128 ASDIC
- Armament: 2 × twin 4-inch (102 mm) guns; 1 × quadruple 2 pdr (40 mm (1.6 in)) AA guns; 2 × single 20 mm (0.8 in) Oerlikon AA guns; 1 × twin 21 in (533 mm) torpedo tubes; 3 × depth charge chutes, 4 × throwers for 110 depth charges

HMS Wensleydale (Pennant number L86) was a Hunt-class escort destroyer built for the Royal Navy during the Second World War. Completed in 1942, the ship spent her career in the English Channel and British coastal waters. Wensleydale participated in a couple of inconclusive actions against German surface ships in 1943, E-boats in May and Type 39 torpedo boats in early October. The outcome of the Battle of Sept-Îles later that month against Type 39s was far different with the British loss of a light cruiser and the forced scuttling of one of Wensleydale's sister ships. A year later, she collided with a Landing Ship, Tank in November 1944 and was severely damaged. The ship was declared a constructive total loss and placed in reserve the following month. She was listed for sale in 1946 and was purchased for scrap by Hughes Bolckow. Wensleydale arrived at their yard in Blyth in early 1947.

== Design and description ==
The Hunt class was meant to fill the Royal Navy's need for a large number of small destroyer-type vessels capable of both convoy escort and operations with the fleet. The Type III Hunts differed from the previous Type II ships in replacing a twin 4-inch gun mount with two torpedo tubes to improve their ability to operate as destroyers.

The Type III Hunts were 264 feet 3 inches (80.54 m) long between perpendiculars and 280 feet (85.34 m) overall, with a beam was 31 feet 6 inches (9.60 m) and draught 12 feet 3 inches (3.73 m) at deep load. Displacement was 1,050 long tons (1,067 t) standard and 1,545 long tons (1,570 t) at full load. The ships were powered by a pair of Parsons geared steam turbines that drove two propeller shafts using steam from two three-drum Admiralty boilers. The turbines were rated at a total of 19,000 shaft horsepower (14,000 kW) that gave a design speed of 27 knots (50 km/h; 31 mph). Enough fuel oil was carried to give the ships a range of 2,400 nautical miles (4,400 km; 2,800 mi) at 20 knots (37 km/h; 23 mph).

The main armament of the Type IIIs was four 4-inch (102 mm) QF Mk XVI dual-purpose guns in two twin-gun mounts, one each fore and aft of the superstructure. Anti-aircraft defence was provided by a quadruple-barrel mount for two-pounder guns positioned behind the funnel and three 20-millimetre (0.8 in) Oerlikon AA guns in the superstructure. A single mount for two 21-inch (533 mm) torpedo tubes was fitted in a mount amidships. The ships' anti-submarine armament could consist of three depth charge chutes, four depth charge throwers and 110 depth charges, although two chutes, four throwers and 70 depth charges was usually carried. A Type 291 search radar and a Type 285 gunnery radar was fitted, as was a Type 128 ASDIC.

== Construction and career ==
Wensleydale was one of 15 Type III Hunt-class destroyers ordered for the Royal Navy on 23 August 1940 as part of the 1940 War Emergency Programme. The ship was laid down by Yarrow Shipbuilders at their shipyard in Scotstoun on 28 July 1941, launched on 20 June 1942 and completed on 30 October. She was assigned to the 15th Destroyer Flotilla, based at Plymouth from December 1942 to September 1944. Wensleydale was slightly damaged in an action against German E-boats on the night of 28/29 May 1943. The ship participated in the Battle of Sept-Îles on the night of 23 October.

The Royal Navy conducted sporadic patrols off the coasts of Brittany and Normandy in an effort to intercept German merchant shipping, blockade runners and warships. Vice-Admiral Sir Ralph Leatham, the newly appointed Commander-in-Chief, Plymouth, created Operation Tunnel, an attempt to systematize the sweeps off the coast of Occupied France in September 1943. The ships available to conduct these patrols varied as ships cycled through Plymouth, although the Hunts of the 15th Destroyer Flotilla usually participated. The constantly changing roster of ships used was a great obstacle as many ships lacked offensive experience, little time was available to train together and develop tactics to coordinate the slow Hunts with the faster fleet destroyers and light cruisers, and to familiarize themselves with the French coastline.

On 22 October, the light cruiser Charybdis, the fleet destroyers Grenville and Rocket and three of Wensleydale's sisters Limbourne, Talybont and Stevenstone sortied from Plymouth in an attempt to sink the blockade runner Münsterland. None of the senior commanders had experience with Tunnel sweeps and little time to plan the operation had been available since the British only had a days notice. Leatham had decided that the sweep from be run from east to west to have the best chance of intercepting the convoy with Münsterland. German coastal radar detected the British ships at 0300 on 23 October and alerted the five Type 39 torpedo boats of the 4th Torpedo Flotilla already at sea and heading eastwards.

Wensleydale collided with LST 367 on 21 November 1944, cracking the hull to a depth of 6 ft (1.8 m) which flooded the engine and gear rooms. She made it to port, but she was not permanently repaired, probably because of the Royal Navy's shortage of manpower and plentiful number of escorts. The ship was placed in reserve on 17 December and listed for sale on 29 June 1946. Wensleydale was sold to Hughes Bolckow and arrived at Blyth on 25 February 1947 to begin demolition.

== Bibliography ==
- Campbell, N. J. M. (1980). "Great Britain (including Empire Forces)". In Chesneau, Roger (ed.). Conway's All the World's Fighting Ships 1922–1946. Conway Maritime Press. pp. 2–85. ISBN 0-85177-146-7.
- Colledge, J. J.; Warlow, Ben & Bush, Steve (2020). Ships of the Royal Navy: The Complete Record of all Fighting Ships of the Royal Navy from the 15th Century to the Present (5th revised and updated ed.). Seaforth Publishing. ISBN 978-1-5267-9327-0.
- English, John (1987). The Hunts: A History of the Design, Development and Careers of the 86 Destroyers of This Class Built for the Royal and Allied Navies during World War II. World Ship Society. ISBN 0-905617-44-4.
- Lenton, H. T. (1998). British & Empire Warships of the Second World War. Naval Institute Press. ISBN 1-55750-048-7.
- Rohwer, Jürgen (2005). Chronology of the War at Sea 1939–1945: The Naval History of World War Two (Third Revised ed.). Naval Institute Press. ISBN 1-59114-119-2.
- Whitby, Michael (2022). "The Challenges of Operation 'Tunnel', September 1943 — April 1944". In Jordan, John (ed.). Warship 2022. Oxford: Osprey Publishing. pp. 29–46. ISBN 978-1-4728-4781-2.
- Whitley, M. J. (2000). Destroyers of World War Two: An International Encyclopedia. London: Cassell & Co. ISBN 1-85409-521-8.
