= HMS Grenville (R97) =

V-class destroyer converted to Type 15 frigate of the Royal Navy

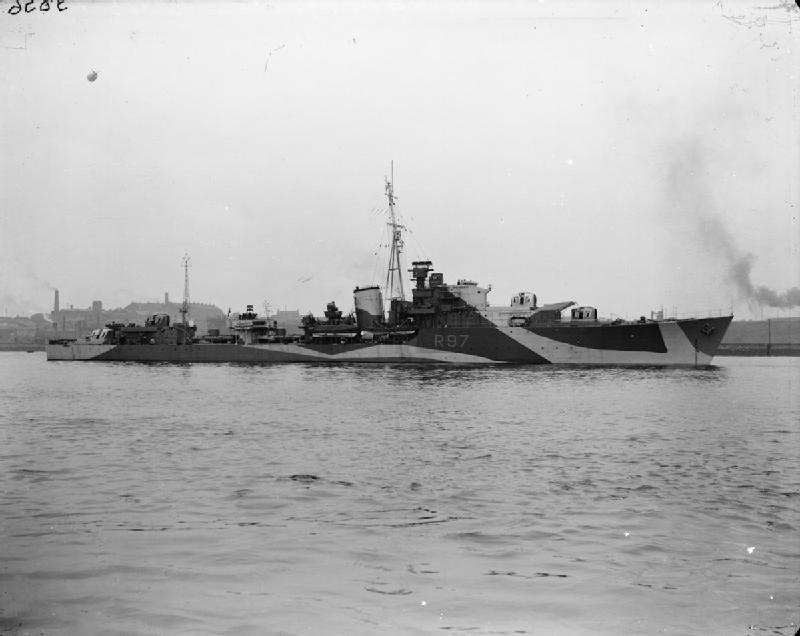
- Grenville on the River Tyne, May 1943

History

United Kingdom
- Name: Grenville
- Builder: Swan Hunter, Tyne and Wear, United Kingdom
- Laid down: 1 November 1941
- Launched: 12 October 1942
- Commissioned: 27 May 1943
- Identification: Pennant number F197
- Fate: Scrapped, 1983

General characteristics
- Class & type: V-class destroyer
- Displacement: 1,777 long tons (1,806 t) (standard); 2,058 long tons (2,091 t) (full load)
- Length: 363 ft (111 m)
- Beam: 35 ft 8 in (10.87 m)
- Draught: 10 ft (3.0 m)
- Propulsion: 2 × Admiralty 3-drum boilers; Geared steam turbines, 40,000 shp (29,828 kW); 2 shafts
- Speed: 37 knots (69 km/h; 43 mph)
- Range: 4,860 nmi (9,000 km; 5,590 mi) at 29 knots (54 km/h; 33 mph)
- Complement: 180 (225 in flotilla leader)
- Armament: Original configuration : 4 × QF 4.7-inch (120-mm) Mk XII guns in single mountings CP Mk.XXII; 2 × QF 40 mm Bofors guns in twin mount Mk.IV; 6 × QF 20 mm Oerlikon guns; 2 × twin mounts Mk.V, 2 × single mounts Mk.III; 2 × quadruple tubes for 21 in (533 mm) torpedo Mk.IX

General characteristics Type 15 frigate
- Class & type: Type 15 frigate
- Displacement: 2,300 long tons (2,337 t) standard
- Length: 358 ft (109 m) o/a
- Beam: 37 ft 9 in (11.51 m)
- Draught: 14 ft 6 in (4.42 m)
- Propulsion: 2 × Admiralty 3-drum boilers, steam turbines on 2 shafts, 40,000 shp
- Speed: 31 knots (57 km/h; 36 mph) (full load)
- Complement: 174
- Sensors & processing systems: Radar; Type 293Q target indication (later Type 993); Type 277Q surface search; Type 974 navigation; Type 262 fire control on director CRBF; Type 1010 Cossor Mark 10 IFF; Sonar: Type 174 search; Type 162 target classification; Type 170 attack
- Armament: 1 × twin 4 in gun Mark 19; 1 × twin 40mm Bofors Mk.5; 2 × Squid A/S mortar or; 2 × Limbo Mark 10 A/S mortar

HMS Grenville was the second ship of this name to serve with the Royal Navy in the Second World War. Grenville and seven other U-class destroyers were ordered as part of the Emergency Programme. She was launched at Swan Hunter and Wigham Richardson Ltd., Wallsend-on-Tyne on 12 October 1942 and commissioned on 27 May 1943.

The Royal Navy's practice had been to name all destroyers of a class with names starting with the class letter, in this "U". However, the Royal Navy had reverted to an earlier practice of naming the flotilla leader after a prominent historical seaman, in this case after Vice Admiral Sir Richard Grenville, an Elizabethan soldier and sailor.

== Design and construction ==
Grenville was one of eight U-class destroyers ordered as the 7th Emergency Flotilla on 12 June 1941, and was fitted as leader. The U-class were War Emergency Programme destroyers, intended for general duties, including use as anti-submarine escort, and were to be suitable for mass-production. They were based on the hull and machinery of the pre-war J-class destroyers, but with a lighter armament (effectively whatever armament was available) in order to speed production. The U-class were almost identical to the S-class ordered as the 5th Emergency Flotilla and the R-class ordered as the 6th Emergency Flotilla earlier in the year, but were not fitted for operations in Arctic waters.

The U-class were 362 feet 9 inches (110.57 m) long overall, 348 feet 0 inches (106.07 m) at the waterline and 339 feet 6 inches (103.48 m) between perpendiculars, with a beam of 35 feet 8 inches (10.87 m) and a draught of 10 feet 0 inches (3.05 m) mean and 14 feet 3 inches (4.34 m) full load. Displacement was 1,777 long tons (1,806 t) standard and 2,528 long tons (2,569 t) full load. Two Admiralty 3-drum water-tube boilers supplied steam at 300 pounds per square inch (2,100 kPa) and 630 °F (332 °C) to two sets of Parsons single-reduction geared steam turbines, which drove two propeller shafts. The machinery was rated at 40,000 shaft horsepower (30,000 kW) giving a maximum speed of 36 knots (41 mph; 67 km/h) and 32 knots (37 mph; 59 km/h) at full load. 615 tons of oil were carried, giving a range of 4,675 nautical miles (5,380 mi; 8,658 km) at 20 knots (23 mph; 37 km/h).

The ship had a main gun armament of four 4.7 inch (120 mm) QF Mk. IX guns, capable of elevating to an angle of 55 degrees, giving a degree of anti-aircraft capability. The close-in anti-aircraft armament for the class was one Hazemayer stabilised twin mount for the Bofors 40 mm gun and four twin Oerlikon 20 mm cannons. This was modified in 1945, with 5 single 40mm Bofors guns added, with one manually operated Mark III mount in the searchlight position and four power-operated "Boffin" mounts replacing the twin Oerlikon mounts. Two quadruple mounts for 21 inch (533 mm) torpedoes were fitted (these were actually spare quintuple mounts with the centre tube removed), while the ship had a depth charge outfit of four depth charge mortars and two racks, with a total of 70 charges carried.

Grenville was fitted with a Type 291 air warning radar on the ship's tripod foremast, together with a high-frequency direction finding (HF/DF) aerial, with the tripod mast later replaced by a lattice mast. A Type 285 fire control radar integrated with the ship's high-angle gun director, while the Hazemayer mount had an integrated Type 282 radar. As leader, Grenville had a crew of 225 officers and other ranks.

Grenville was laid down at Swan Hunter's Wallsend shipyard on 1 November 1941 and was launched on 12 October 1942. She was completed on 27 May 1943, and assigned the Pennant number R97.

=== Type 15 modification ===
After the end of the Second World War and as the Cold War started, the Royal Navy found itself with a shortage of fast anti-submarine escorts capable of dealing with modern Soviet diesel-electric submarines, with existing sloops and frigates too slow. At the same time, the relatively recent War Emergency destroyers, with their low-angle guns and basic fire control systems, were considered unsuitable for modern warfare, so it was decided to convert these obsolete destroyers into fast escorts, acting as a stop-gap solution until new-build ships, such as the Type 12 frigates could be built in sufficient numbers. The Type 15 frigate was a rebuild of War Emergency destroyers into 'first-rate' anti-submarine ships, with similar anti-submarine equipment as the new frigates. The ships' superstructure and armament was removed, with the ships' forecastle extended rearwards and a new, low but full width superstructure fitted. The revised ships had a much reduced gun armament of one twin 4-inch (102 mm) anti aircraft mount aft of the main superstructure and one twin Bofors mount, but anti-submarine equipment was as fitted to the Type 12s, with Grenville being fitted with two Limbo anti-submarine mortars, directed by Type 170 and 172 sonar.

== Service history ==
=== Second World War service ===
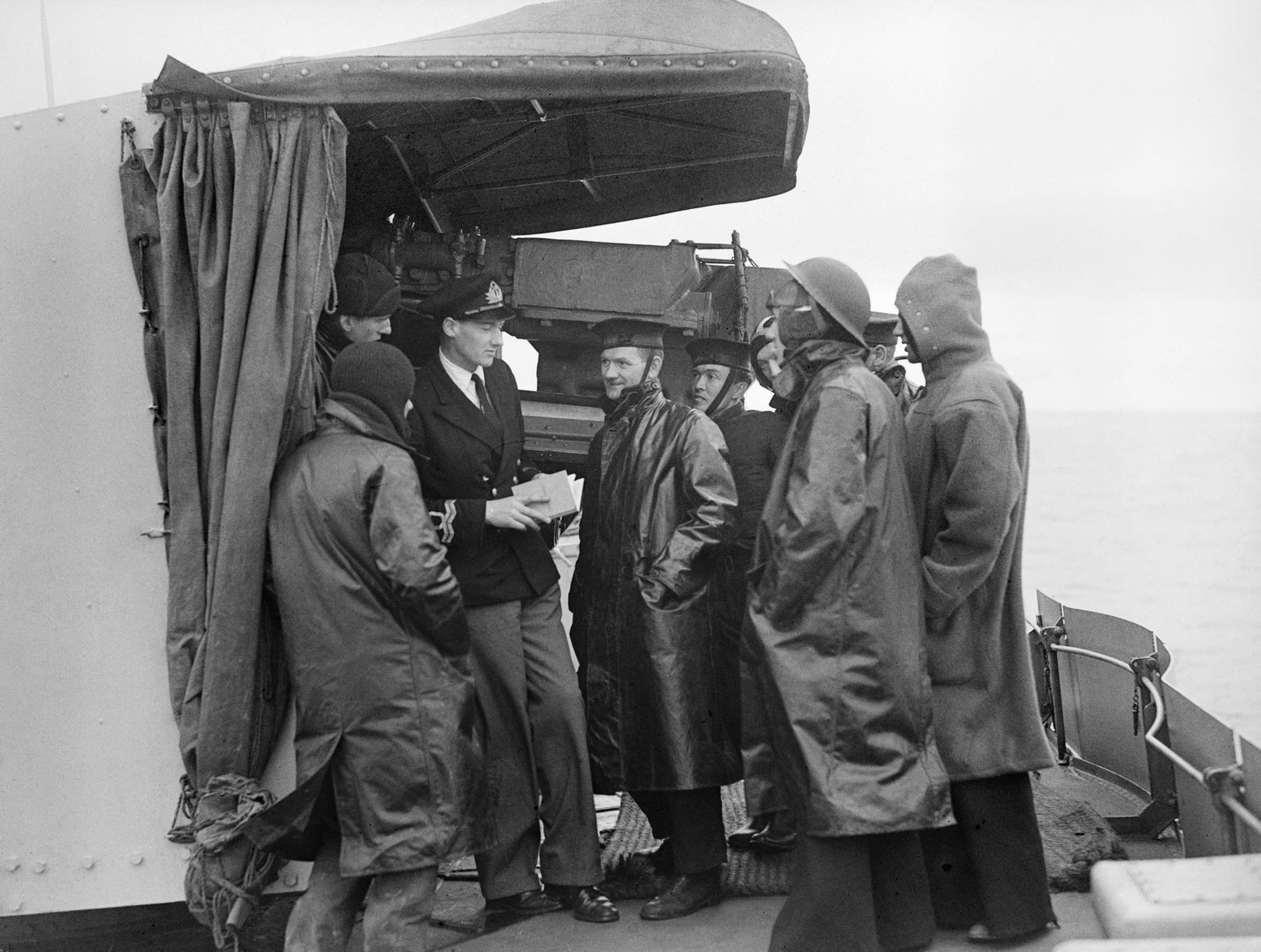
Gunners on board HMS Grenville during a Large Scale Reconnaissance Carried Out by British and American Battleships, Cruisers, Aircraft Carriers and Destroyer 25–29 July 1943 (IWM A18340)

In late August 1943, Grenville and the Canadian destroyer Athabaskan formed the force covering anti-submarine sweeps by the Canadian 5th Support group, off north-west Spain. These ships were attacked by eighteen Dornier Do 217s using Henschel Hs293 A-1 glider bombs. Athabaskan was heavily damaged and the sloop Egret was sunk with the loss of 194 of her crew. After this, the U-boat hunt was abandoned.

Later on, in September and October, Grenville was involved in a series of blockade runner sweeps along the French coast (Operation Tunnel).

On 4 October, she joined in an action with enemy destroyers in which she was hit and suffered a small number of casualties. Later in October, during another of these sweeps, Grenville was with the cruiser Charybdis and other destroyers in another, more disastrous, Operation Tunnel action against a blockade runner off the north coast of Brittany. In this operation, the cruiser Charybdis and destroyer Limbourne were sunk by German Elbing-class torpedo boats.

In November, Grenville joined the 24th Destroyer Flotilla and the Mediterranean Fleet. In the Mediterranean, she supported the Anzio landings, sunk an E-boat and destroyed a train near San Giorgio on the Adriatic Sea.

On 3 December, she was ordered to refuel, arriving immediately after the air raid on Bari, a mustard gas disaster.

In May 1944, Grenville returned to Britain and in June took part in the landings in Normandy.

At the end of 1944, after a refit on the Humber, she left for the Indian Ocean where she joined operations against the Japanese. In January 1945, Grenville and three other U-class destroyers forming the 26th Destroyer Flotilla, escorted the British carrier force (Task Force 63) that became the British Pacific Fleet. After raids against Japanese installations on Sumatra, TF63 left for Okinawa, via Sydney, where there were air strikes on Japanese airfields in support of Operation Iceberg. Later, Grenville participated in the final raids on the Japanese home islands. Near the end of the Pacific war, several Allied warships began to relay Australian programmes to surrounding areas on shortwave. Grenville was one of these heard relaying the commercial programmes from 2KY Sydney in January 1946.

=== Post-war ===
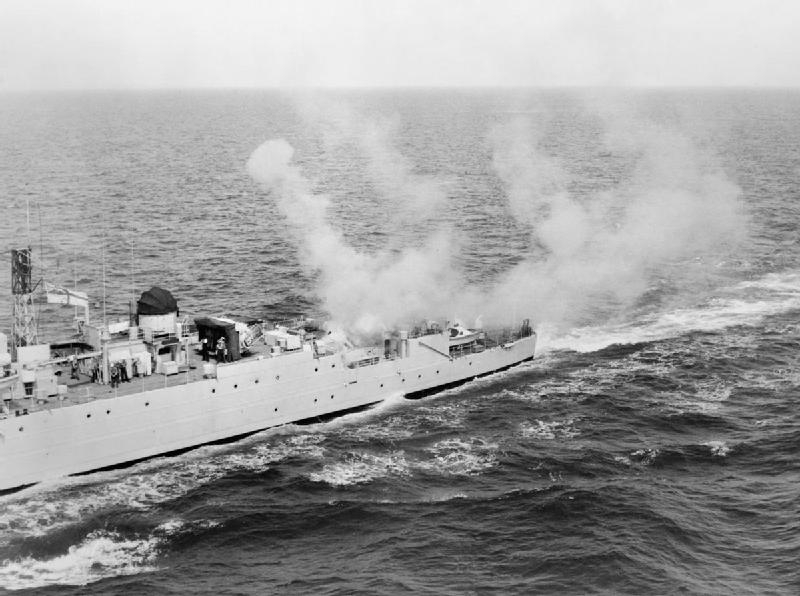
Grenville firing her Limbo mortar after conversion to an ASW frigate

Grenville served as part of the 25th Destroyer Flotilla in the Pacific and in 1946 and returned to Portsmouth where she was placed in reserve. In 1951 she served as part of the Plymouth Local Flotilla and was used as an air training target vessel in October 1951. She collided with the Italian ship Alceo, off Start Point, Devon. Three crewmen on the Grenville died and another four were listed as missing. After repairs she was re-commissioned at Devonport on 5 August 1952.

In 1953 - 54, she was extensively converted and re-armed into a Type 15 frigate. On 19 March 1954 she re-commissioned as leader of the 2nd Training Squadron, based at Portland. In 1957 she was fitted with an experimental helicopter landing pad for use during trials with the Fairey Ultra-light Helicopter. In December 1958 she replaced Torquay in the 5th Frigate Squadron. Between 1960 and 1964 she was held in reserve at Gibraltar.

In June 1966 she arrived back in Portsmouth under tow and was subsequently fitted with a third mast carrying experimental air-search radar, prior to its operational use in Invincible-class aircraft carriers. She attended Portsmouth Navy Days in 1967. In 1969 she replaced Wakeful in the 2nd Frigate Squadron.

In 1970 she was again present at Portsmouth Navy Days; at the time she was a trials ship for the Admiralty Surface Weapons Establishment (ASWE).

Grenville was paid off in 1974 and laid up in Portsmouth before being scrapped on the River Medway in 1983.

== Bibliography ==
- Colledge, J. J.; Wardlow, Ben & Bush, Steve (2020). Ships of the Royal Navy: The Complete Record of All Fighting Ships of the Royal Navy from the 15th Century to the Present (5th ed.). Barnsley, UK: Seaforth Publishing. ISBN 978-1-5267-9327-0.
- English, John (2008). Obdurate to Daring: British Fleet Destroyers 1941–45. Windsor, UK: World Ship Society. ISBN 978-0-9560769-0-8.
- Friedman, Norman (2008). British Destroyers & Frigates: The Second World War and After. Barnsley, UK: Seaforth Publishing. ISBN 978-1-84832-015-4.
- Gardiner, Robert; Chesneau, Roger, eds. (1980). Conway's All The World's Fighting Ships 1922–1946. London: Conway Maritime Press. ISBN 0-85177-146-7.
- Gardiner, Robert; Chumbley, Stephen, eds. (1995). Conway's All The World's Fighting Ships 1947–1995. Annapolis, Maryland, USA: Naval Institute Press. ISBN 1-55750-132-7.
- Hill, Roger (1975). Destroyer Captain. London: Kimber. ISBN 0718300947.
- Lenton, H.T. (1970). Navies of the Second World War: British Fleet & Escort Destroyers Volume Two. London: Macdonald & Co. ISBN 0-356-03122-5.
- Marriott, Leo (1983). Royal Navy Frigates 1945–1983. Shepperton, UK: Ian Allan. ISBN 0-7110-1322-5.
- Marriott, Leo (1989). Royal Navy Destroyers since 1945. Ian Allan. ISBN 0-7110-1817-0.
- Raven, Alan; Roberts, John (1978). War Built Destroyers O to Z Classes. London: Bivouac Books. ISBN 0-85680-010-4.
- Richardson, Ian (August 2021). Osborne, Richard (ed.). "Type 15 Frigates, Part 2: Ship Histories". Warships: Marine News Supplement. 75 (8): 381–391. ISSN 0966-6958.
- Whitley, M. J. (1988). Destroyers of World War Two: An International Encyclopedia. Annapolis, Maryland: Naval Institute Press. ISBN 0-87021-326-1.
- Whitley, M. J. (2000). Destroyers of World War 2: An International Encyclopedia. London: Cassell & Co. ISBN 1-85409-521-8.
