= HMS Stevenstone =

British naval vessel

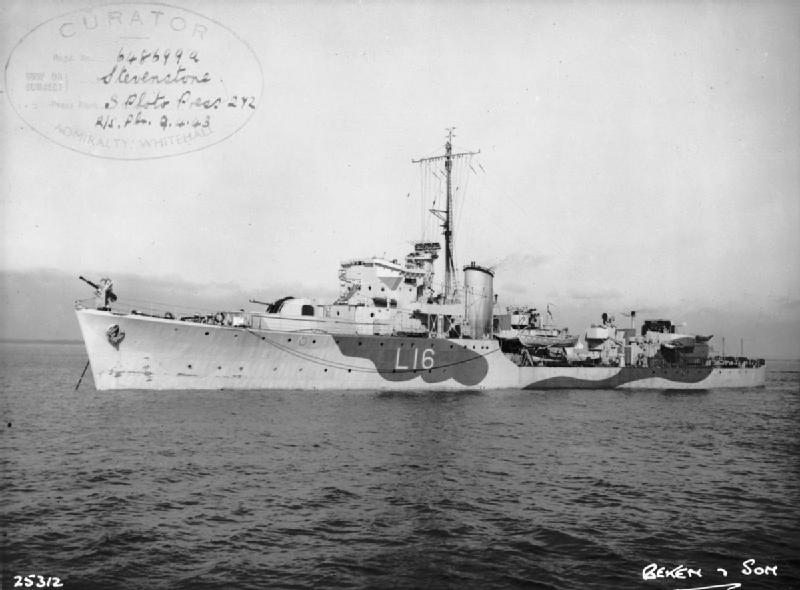
- Stevenstone at anchor in the Solent

History

United Kingdom
- Name: Stevenstone
- Ordered: 23 August 1940
- Builder: J. Samuel White, East Cowes, Isle of Wight
- Laid down: 2 September 1941
- Launched: 23 November 1942
- Commissioned: 18 March 1943
- Identification: Pennant number: L16
- Honours and awards: English Channel 1943-44; North Sea 1944; Normandy 1944
- Fate: Scrapped, 1959
- Badge: On a Field per fess wavy Blue and White a cubit arm vested blue charged with a fesse indented and double cotised Gold, the hand proper grasping a horn also Gold.

General characteristics
- Class & type: Hunt-class destroyer
- Displacement: 1,050 long tons (1,070 t) (standard)
- Length: 280 ft (85.3 m) (o/a)
- Beam: 31 ft 6 in (9.6 m)
- Draught: 12 ft 3 in (3.7 m)
- Installed power: 2 Admiralty 3-drum boilers; 19,000 shp (14,000 kW)
- Propulsion: 2 shafts; geared steam turbines
- Speed: 27 knots (50 km/h; 31 mph)
- Range: 2,350 nmi (4,350 km; 2,700 mi) at 20 knots (37 km/h; 23 mph)
- Complement: 168
- Sensors & processing systems: Type 291 search radar; Type 285 gunnery radar; Type 128 ASDIC
- Armament: 2 × twin 4-inch (102 mm) guns; 1 × quadruple 2 pdr (40 mm (1.6 in)) AA guns; 2 × single 20 mm (0.8 in) Oerlikon AA guns; 1 × twin 21 in (533 mm) torpedo tubes; 3 × depth charge chutes, 4 × throwers for 110 depth charges

HMS Stevenstone (Pennant number L16) was a Hunt-class destroyer built for the Royal Navy during the Second World War. She was a member of the third subgroup of the class. Completed in 1943, the ship spent the war in the English Channel and British coastal waters. She struck a mine that killed 14 of her crew in November 1944 and was under repair until June 1945. Stevenstone was reduced to reserve in 1947 and was sold for scrap in 1959.

== Design and description ==
The Hunt class was meant to fill the Royal Navy's need for a large number of small destroyer-type vessels capable of both convoy escort and operations with the fleet. The Type III Hunts differed from the previous Type II ships in replacing a twin 4-inch gun mount with two torpedo tubes to improve their ability to operate as destroyers.

The Type III Hunts were 264 feet 3 inches (80.54 m) long between perpendiculars and 280 feet (85.34 m) overall, with a beam was 31 feet 6 inches (9.60 m) and draught 12 feet 3 inches (3.73 m) at deep load. Displacement was 1,050 long tons (1,067 t) standard and 1,545 long tons (1,570 t) at full load. The ships were powered by a pair of Parsons geared steam turbines that drove two propeller shafts using steam from two three-drum Admiralty boilers. The turbines were rated at a total of 19,000 shaft horsepower (14,000 kW) that gave a design speed of 27 knots (50 km/h; 31 mph). Enough fuel oil was carried to give the ships a range of 2,400 nautical miles (4,400 km; 2,800 mi) at 20 knots (37 km/h; 23 mph).

The main armament of the Type IIIs was four 4-inch (102 mm) QF Mk XVI dual-purpose guns in two twin-gun mounts, one each fore and aft of the superstructure. Anti-aircraft defence was provided by a quadruple-barrel mount for two-pounder guns positioned behind the funnel and three 20-millimetre (0.8 in) Oerlikon AA guns in the superstructure. A single mount for two 21-inch (533 mm) torpedo tubes was fitted in a mount amidships. The ships' anti-submarine armament could consist of three depth charge chutes, four depth charge throwers and 110 depth charges, although two chutes, four throwers and 70 depth charges was usually carried. A Type 291 search radar and a Type 285 gunnery radar was fitted, as was a Type 128 ASDIC.

== Construction and career ==
Stevenstone was one of 15 Type III Hunt-class destroyers ordered for the Royal Navy on 23 August 1940 as part of the 1940 War Emergency Programme. The ship was laid down by J. Samuel White at their shipyard in Cowes on 2 September 1941, launched on 23 November 1942 and completed on 18 March 1943. Stevenstone struck a mine off Ostend, Belgium on 30 November 1944. The detonation killed 14 crewmen and wounded 18 while blowing a 11-by-12-foot (3.4 by 3.7 m) hole in the hull and flooding the bow compartments. Repairs lasted from 22 December to 28 June 1945.

== Bibliography ==
- Campbell, N. J. M. (1980). "Great Britain (including Empire Forces)". In Chesneau, Roger (ed.). Conway's All the World's Fighting Ships 1922–1946. Conway Maritime Press. pp. 2–85. ISBN 0-85177-146-7.
- Colledge, J. J.; Warlow, Ben & Bush, Steve (2020). Ships of the Royal Navy: The Complete Record of all Fighting Ships of the Royal Navy from the 15th Century to the Present (5th revised and updated ed.). Seaforth Publishing. ISBN 978-1-5267-9327-0.
- English, John (1987). The Hunts: A History of the Design, Development and Careers of the 86 Destroyers of This Class Built for the Royal and Allied Navies during World War II. World Ship Society. ISBN 0-905617-44-4.
- Lenton, H. T. (1998). British & Empire Warships of the Second World War. Naval Institute Press. ISBN 1-55750-048-7.
- Rohwer, Jürgen (2005). Chronology of the War at Sea 1939–1945: The Naval History of World War Two (Third Revised ed.). Naval Institute Press. ISBN 1-59114-119-2.
- Whitley, M. J. (2000). Destroyers of World War Two: An International Encyclopedia. London: Cassell & Co. ISBN 1-85409-521-8.
