= German cruiser Admiral Hipper =

Lead ship of class of German heavy cruisers

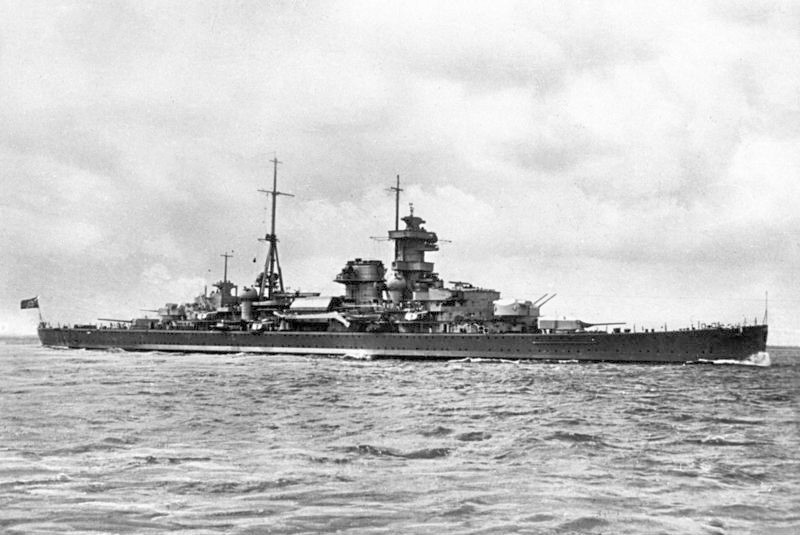
- Admiral Hipper in 1939

History

Nazi Germany
- Name: Admiral Hipper
- Namesake: Admiral Franz von Hipper
- Builder: Blohm & Voss, Hamburg
- Laid down: 6 July 1935
- Launched: 6 February 1937
- Commissioned: 29 April 1939
- Fate: Scuttled, 3 May 1945, raised and scrapped in 1948–1952

General characteristics
- Class & type: Admiral Hipper-class cruiser
- Displacement: Normal: 16,170 t (15,910 long tons); Full load: 18,500 t (18,200 long tons)
- Length: 202.8 m (665 ft 4 in) overall
- Beam: 21.3 m (69 ft 11 in)
- Draft: Full load: 7.2 m (24 ft)
- Installed power: 132,000 shp (98 MW)
- Propulsion: 3 × Blohm & Voss steam turbines; 3 × propellers
- Speed: 32 knots (59 km/h; 37 mph)
- Complement: 42 officers; 1,340 enlisted
- Armament: 8 × 20.3 cm (8 in) guns; 12 × 10.5 cm (4.1 in) SK C/33 guns; 12 × 3.7 cm (1.5 in) SK C/30 guns; 8 × 2 cm (0.79 in) C/30 guns; 12 × 53.3 cm (21 in) torpedo tubes
- Armor: Belt: 70 to 80 mm (2.8 to 3.1 in); Armor deck: 20 to 50 mm (0.79 to 1.97 in); Turret faces: 105 mm (4.1 in)
- Aircraft carried: 3 Arado Ar 196
- Aviation facilities: 1 catapult

Admiral Hipper was the lead ship of the Admiral Hipper class of heavy cruisers which served with Nazi Germany's Kriegsmarine during World War II. The ship was laid down at the Blohm & Voss shipyard in Hamburg in July 1935 and launched in February 1937; Admiral Hipper entered service shortly before the outbreak of war, in April 1939. The ship was named after Admiral Franz von Hipper, commander of the German battlecruiser squadron during the Battle of Jutland in 1916 and later commander-in-chief of the German High Seas Fleet. She was armed with a main battery of eight 20.3 cm (8 in) guns and, although nominally under the 10,000-long-ton (10,160 t) limit set by the Anglo-German Naval Agreement, actually displaced over 16,000 long tons (16,260 t).

Admiral Hipper saw a significant amount of action during the war, notably in the Battle of the Atlantic. She also led the assault on Trondheim during Operation Weserübung; while en route to her objective, she sank the British destroyer HMS Glowworm. In December 1940, she broke out into the Atlantic Ocean to operate against Allied merchant shipping. This operation ended without significant success, but in February 1941, Admiral Hipper sortied again, sinking several merchant vessels before eventually returning to Germany via the Denmark Strait. The ship was then transferred to northern Norway to participate in operations against convoys to the Soviet Union, culminating in the Battle of the Barents Sea on 31 December 1942, in which she sank the destroyer Achates and the minesweeper Bramble, but was in turn damaged and forced to withdraw by the light cruisers HMS Sheffield and Jamaica.

Disappointed by the failure to sink merchant ships in that battle, Adolf Hitler ordered the majority of the surface warships scrapped, though Admiral Karl Dönitz was able to persuade Hitler to retain the surface fleet. As a result, Admiral Hipper was returned to Germany and decommissioned for repairs. The ship was never restored to operational status, however, and on 3 May 1945, Royal Air Force bombers severely damaged her while she was in Kiel, Germany. Her crew scuttled the ship at her moorings, and in July 1945, she was raised and towed to Heikendorfer Bay. She was ultimately broken up for scrap in 1948–1952; her bell is currently on display at the Laboe Naval Memorial near Kiel.

== Design ==
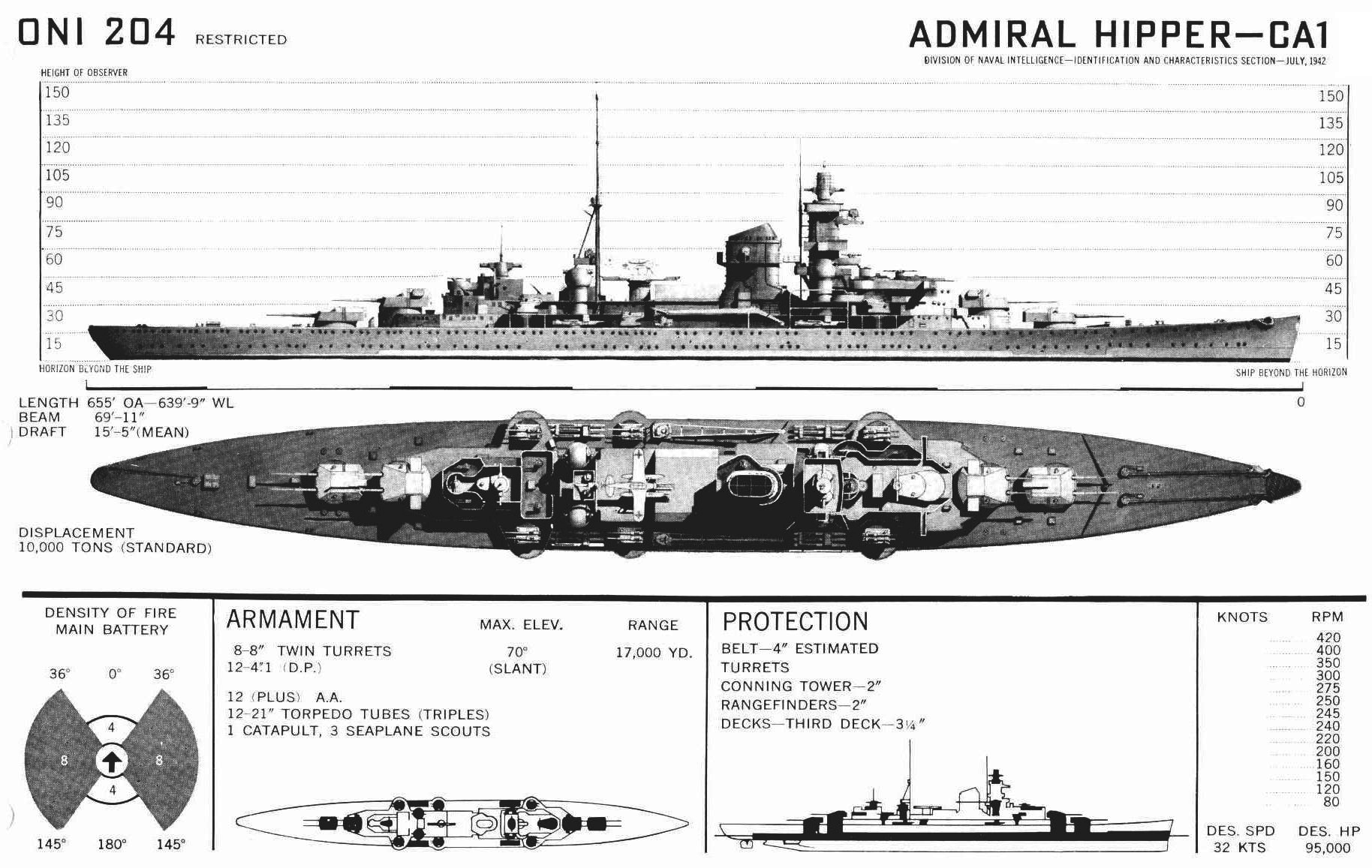
Recognition drawing of an Admiral Hipper-class cruiser

The Admiral Hipper class of heavy cruisers was ordered in the context of German naval rearmament after the Nazi Party came to power in 1933 and repudiated the disarmament clauses of the Treaty of Versailles. In 1935, Germany signed the Anglo–German Naval Agreement with Great Britain, which provided a legal basis for German naval rearmament; the treaty specified that Germany would be able to build five 10,000-long-ton (10,160 t) "treaty cruisers". The Admiral Hippers were nominally within the 10,000-ton limit, though they significantly exceeded the figure.

Admiral Hipper was 202.8 meters (665 ft) long overall and had a beam of 21.3 m (70 ft) and a maximum draft of 7.2 m (24 ft). After the installation of a clipper bow during fitting out, her overall length increased to 205.9 meters (676 ft). The ship had a design displacement of 16,170 t (15,910 long tons; 17,820 short tons) and a full load displacement of 18,200 long tons (18,500 t). Admiral Hipper was powered by three sets of geared steam turbines, which were supplied with steam by twelve ultra-high pressure oil-fired boilers. The ship's top speed was 32 knots (59 km/h; 37 mph), at 132,000 shaft horsepower (98,000 kW). Her standard complement consisted of 42 officers and 1,340 enlisted men.

Admiral Hipper's primary armament was eight 20.3 cm (8 in) SK L/60 guns mounted in four twin gun turrets, placed in superfiring pairs forward and aft. (Note: "L/60" denotes the length of the gun in terms of caliber. The length of 60 caliber gun is 60 times greater than it is wide in diameter.) Her anti-aircraft battery consisted of twelve 10.5 cm (4.1 in) L/65 guns, twelve 3.7 cm (1.5 in) guns, and eight 2 cm (0.79 in) guns. She had four triple 53.3 cm (21.0 in) torpedo launchers, all on the main deck next to the four range finders for the anti-aircraft guns.

Admiral Hipper's armored belt was 70 to 80 mm (2.8 to 3.1 in) thick; her upper deck was 12 to 30 mm (0.47 to 1.18 in) thick while the main armored deck was 20 to 50 mm (0.79 to 1.97 in) thick. The main battery turrets had 105 mm (4.1 in) thick faces and 70 mm thick sides. The heaviest armor with 150 mm (5.9 in) thickness was applied to the vertical surfaces of the conning tower, while the horizontal surfaces were limited to 50 mm (2.0 in).

The initial design of Admiral Hipper included an aircraft hangar for one aircraft. During building, the requirements were changed and an aircraft hangar was constructed for two floatplanes that could be stored side by side. The wider aircraft hangar forced the rearrangement of the middle pair of 10.5 cm guns from the superstructure deck to the upper deck, which restricted their arc of fire towards the rear. The ship was equipped with three Arado Ar 196 seaplanes and one catapult. In 1941 the aircraft hangar was reduced with place for just one Arado and in total only two Arado floatplanes were carried.

== Service history ==
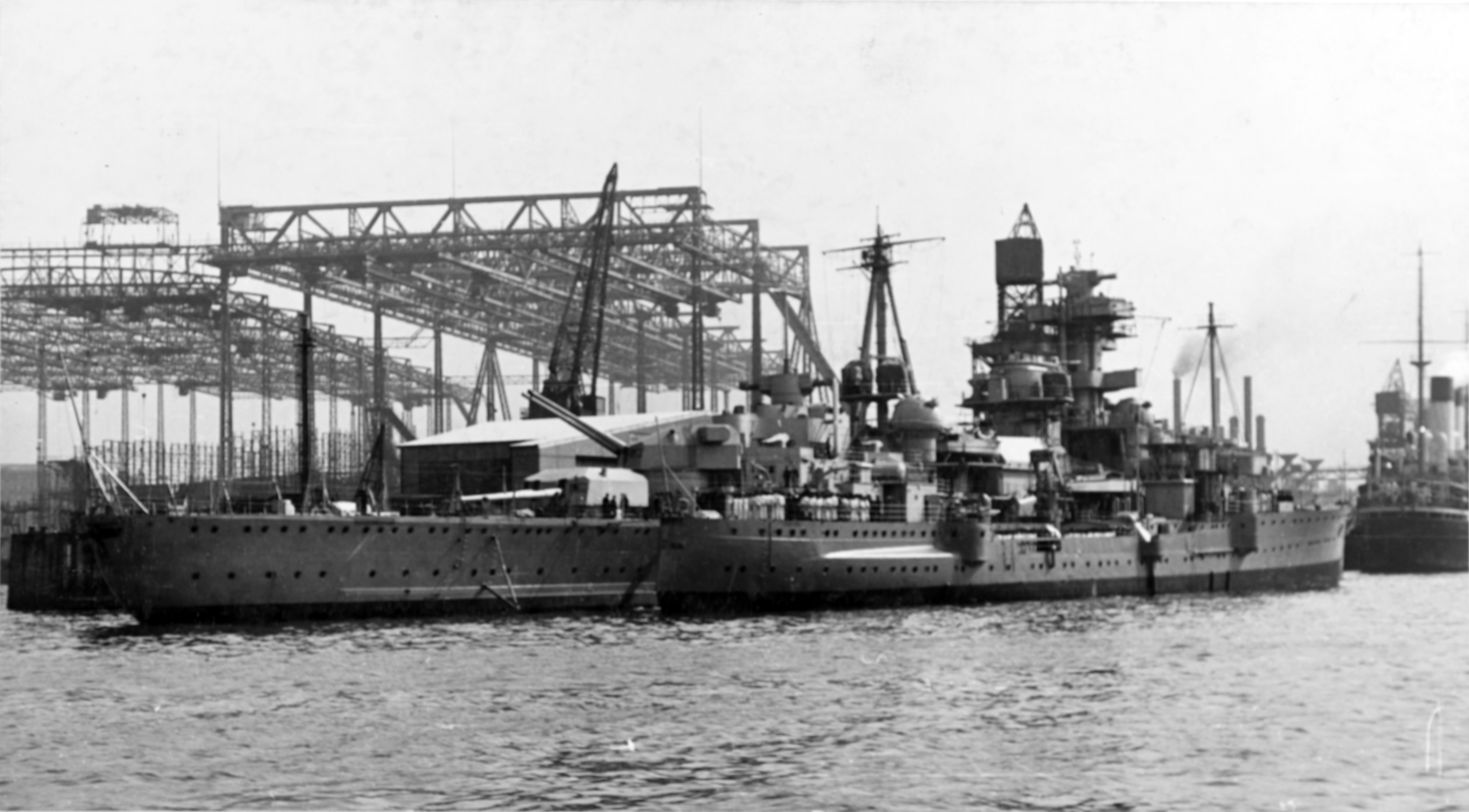
Admiral Hipper during fitting-out in 1937

Admiral Hipper was ordered by the Kriegsmarine from the Blohm & Voss shipyard in Hamburg. Her keel was laid on 6 July 1935, under construction number 501. The ship was launched on 6 February 1937, and was completed on 29 April 1939, the day she was commissioned into the German fleet. The Commander-in-Chief of the Kriegsmarine, Großadmiral (Grand Admiral) Erich Raeder, who had been Franz von Hipper's chief of staff during World War I, gave the christening speech and his wife Erika Raeder performed the christening. As built, the ship had a straight stem, though after her launch this was replaced with a clipper bow. A raked funnel cap was also installed.

Kapitän zur See (Captain at Sea) Hellmuth Heye was given command of the ship at her commissioning. After her commissioning in April 1939, Admiral Hipper steamed into the Baltic Sea to conduct training maneuvers. The ship also made port calls to various Baltic ports, including cities in Estonia and Sweden. In August, the ship conducted live fire drills in the Baltic. At the outbreak of World War II in September 1939, the ship was still conducting gunnery trials. She was briefly used to patrol the Baltic, but she did not see combat, and was quickly returned to training exercises. In November 1939, the ship returned to the Blohm & Voss dockyard for modifications; these included the replacement of the straight stem with a clipper bow and the installation of the funnel cap.

Sea trials in the Baltic resumed in January 1940, but severe ice restrained the ship to port. On 17 February, the Kriegsmarine pronounced the ship fully operational, and on the following day, Admiral Hipper began her first major wartime patrol during Operation Nordmark. She joined the battleships Scharnhorst and Gneisenau and the destroyers Z20 Karl Galster and Z21 Wilhelm Heidkamp in a sortie into the North Sea off Bergen, Norway. A third destroyer, Z9 Wolfgang Zenker, was forced to turn back after sustaining damage from ice. The ships operated under the command of Admiral Wilhelm Marschall. The ships attempted to locate British merchant shipping, but failed and returned to port on 20 February.

=== Norwegian campaign ===
==== Operation Weserübung ====
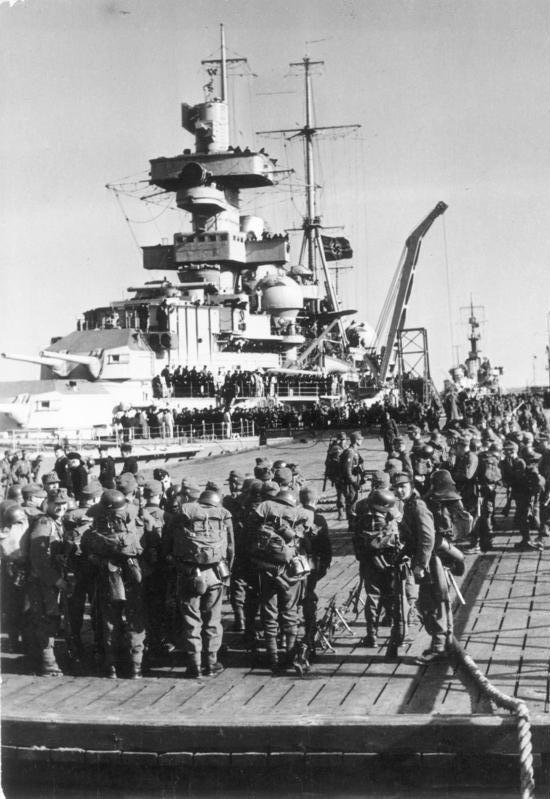
Admiral Hipper loading mountain troops in Cuxhaven

Following her return from the North Sea sortie, Admiral Hipper was assigned to the forces tasked with the invasion of Norway, codenamed Operation Weserübung. The ship was assigned as the flagship of Group 2, along with the destroyers Z5 Paul Jakobi, Z6 Theodor Riedel, Z16 Friedrich Eckoldt, and Z8 Bruno Heinemann. KzS Heye was given command of Group 2 during the operation. The five ships carried a total of 1,700 Wehrmacht mountain troops, whose objective was the port of Trondheim; the ships loaded the troops in Cuxhaven. The ships steamed to the Schillig roadstead outside Wilhelmshaven, where they joined Group 1, consisting of ten destroyers, and the battleships Scharnhorst and Gneisenau under the command of Vice Admiral Günther Lütjens, which were assigned to cover Groups 1 and 2. The ships steamed out of the roadstead at midnight on the night of 6–7 April 1940.

Between 14:25 and 14:48 on 7 April, the ships were unsuccessfully attacked west of the Skagerrak by twelve bombers. By evening the weather had deteriorated and several of the destroyers were unable to maintain the high (27 knots) speed and remained behind the main force. On 8 April at 09:15 one of the trailing destroyers, the Z11 Bernd von Arnim, signaled that it had engaged a British destroyer, and at 09:22 Lütjens ordered the Admiral Hipper to investigate. Upon arriving on the scene, Admiral Hipper was initially misidentified by the British destroyer HMS Glowworm as a friendly vessel, which allowed the German ship to close the distance and fire first. Admiral Hipper rained fire on Glowworm, scoring several hits. Glowworm attempted to flee, but when it became apparent she could not break away from the pursuing cruiser, she turned toward Admiral Hipper and fired a spread of torpedoes, all of which missed.

The British destroyer scored one hit on Admiral Hipper's starboard bow before a rudder malfunction set the ship on a collision course with the German cruiser. The collision with Glowworm tore off a 40-meter (130 ft) section of Admiral Hipper's armored belt on the starboard side, as well as the ship's starboard torpedo launcher. Minor flooding caused a four degree list to starboard, though the ship was able to continue with the mission. Glowworm's boilers exploded shortly after the collision, causing her to sink quickly. Forty survivors were picked up by the German ship. At 11:14 Admiral Hipper broke off the rescue operation and set course toward Trondheim with her four destroyers, whilst Group 1 set course for Narvik. Scharnhorst and Gneisenau took a position south of the Lofoten in the Vestfjorden to cover both landings. The British destroyer had survived long enough to send a wireless message to the Admiralty, that allowed the battlecruiser Renown time to move into position to engage Scharnhorst and Gneisenau, though the German battleships used their superior speed to break contact.

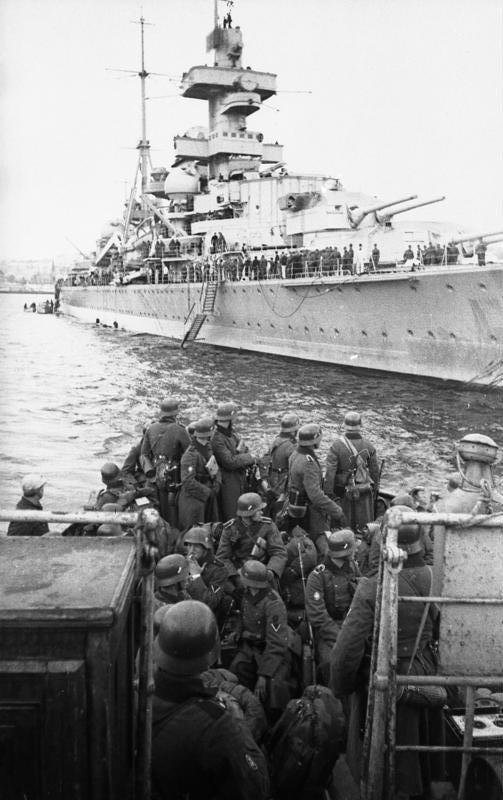
Admiral Hipper landing troops in Trondheim

Group 2 was sighted at 14:50 by a Short Sunderland, and signal intelligence indicated enemy ships were operating nearby. In order to clarify the situation, at 17:50 Admiral Hipper launched an Arado seaplane in the direction of Trondheim. The Arado reported no activity in the approaches to Trondheim and then made an emergency landing in Eide Municipality, since the weather was too bad to land at Admiral Hipper in open sea. After trying to purchase fuel from locals, the aircrew were detained and handed over to the police. The Royal Norwegian Navy Air Service captured the Arado, which was painted in Norwegian colors and used by the Norwegians until 18 April when it was evacuated to Britain.

When steaming at maximum speed through the long and narrow Trondheim Fjord towards Trondheim, Admiral Hipper successfully passed herself off as a British warship long enough to get past the Norwegian coastal artillery batteries. After the ships forced the most narrow part of the fjord between 04:04 and 04:14, one Norwegian battery belatedly opened fire but to no effect. Admiral Hipper responded with two salvoes from the rear turrets. The two remaining Arado seaplanes were flown off to scout and check for suitable places for airplane and seaplane bases. One of the aircraft also attacked a coastal battery with bombs. The cruiser entered the harbor and anchored at 05:25 to disembark the mountain troops. A German tanker which was scheduled to refuel Group 2 at Trondheim failed to show up, and the ships had to remain in harbor because of fuel shortage.

On 10 April an Arado seaplane from Scharnhorst brought orders from Lütjens to attempt a breakout and return to Germany together with the two battleships on the following night. Admiral Hipper left Trondheim at 21:30, escorted by Friedrich Eckoldt. The two ships first steamed northwest to clear the Norwegian coast. On 11 April, at 02:50, Friedrich Eckoldt returned to Trondheim due to bad weather and lack of fuel. This same bad weather allowed Admiral Hipper to take a short, direct route to Germany. The ship joined Scharnhorst and Gneisenau at 08:00 on 12 April, and they reached Wilhelmshaven at 22:00, Admiral Hipper with only 125 out of 3005 cubic meters of fuel remaining. Admiral Hipper went into dry dock where it was discovered the ship had been damaged more severely by the collision with Glowworm than had previously been thought. Nevertheless, repairs were completed in the span of two weeks.

==== Operation Juno ====
Marschall organized a mission to seize Harstad in Northern Norway in early June 1940; Admiral Hipper, the battleships Scharnhorst and Gneisenau, and the destroyers Z7 Hermann Schoemann, Z10 Hans Lody, Z15 Erich Steinbrinck and Z20 Karl Galster were tasked with the operation. The ships departed from Kiel on 4 June. Three days later, Admiral Hipper and the four destroyers refueled from the supply ship Dithmarschen. The plan was to attack the British base at Harstadt in the morning of 9 June, but shortly after midnight of 8 June the plan was changed: a reconnaissance plane reported no ships in Harstadt and since the German ships also detected highly increased convoy radio transmissions, Marschall deduced that the British were evacuating Harstadt. Instead of raiding Harstadt, Marschall decided to operate against the evacuation convoy. While in search of the convoy, the German force first encountered the tanker Oil Pioneer at 06:45 on 8 June, which was escorted by the trawler HMT Juniper. Admiral Hipper sank Juniper with gunfire and Gneisenau sank Oil Pioneer. At 10:52, Admiral Hipper encountered and sank the empty troopship Orama. Despite launching their Ar 196 reconnaissance planes, the German ships failed to find the convoy, and at 13:00, Admiral Hipper and the four destroyers returned to Trondheim to cover and protect the German forces there, whilst the battleships refueled from Dithmarschen and continued the operation. Towards the evening Scharnhorst and Gneisenau found a British force consisting of the British aircraft carrier HMS Glorious and two escorting destroyers, Ardent and Acasta. All three British ships were sunk but Scharnhorst was heavily damaged by a torpedo hit and both German battleships returned to Trondheim on 9 June as well.

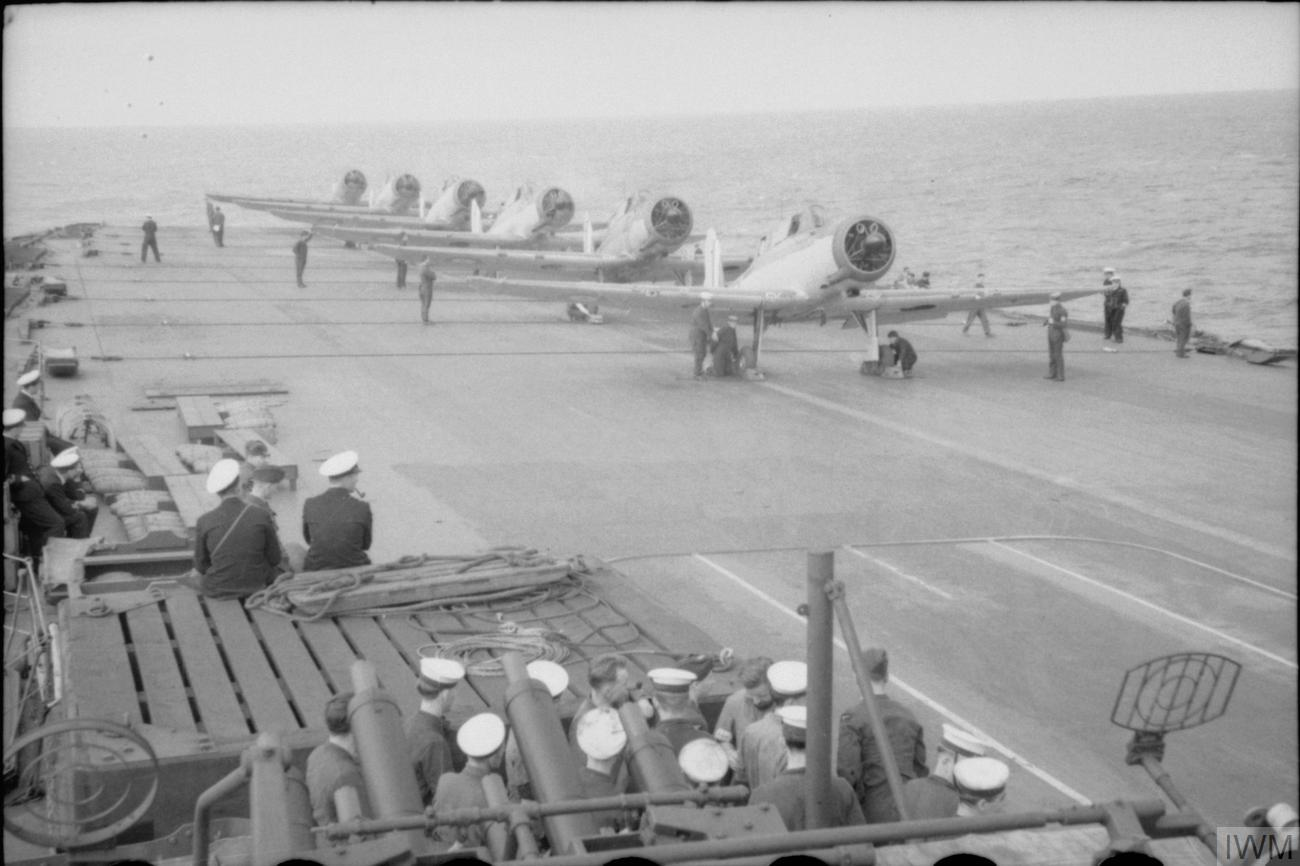
six Blackburn Skuas from 800 Naval Air Squadron lined up on the deck of Ark Royal

On 10 June, Admiral Hipper and Gneisenau left Trondheim with the four destroyers in a second attempt to attack evacuating convoys but they returned to Trondheim the next day, having failed to locate any British vessels. On 13 June, fifteen Blackburn Skuas from 800 Naval Air Squadron and 803 Naval Air Squadron took off from the British aircraft carrier HMS Ark Royal to attack the German ships at Trondheim. The bombers hit Scharnhorst with a dud bomb and lost eight of their number to fighters and anti-aircraft guns. The anti-aircraft gunners of Admiral Hipper shot down one of the attacking British bombers. In order to cover the return of the damaged Scharnhorst to Germany, Admiral Hipper and Gneisenau left Trondheim on 20 June for a raid towards the Iceland-Faeroes passage, but Gneisenau was torpedoed and damaged by the submarine Clyde and both ships returned to Trondheim the same day

On 25 July, Admiral Hipper steamed out on a commerce raiding patrol in the area between Spitzbergen and Tromsø; the cruise lasted until 9 August. The Arado seaplanes could find a few ships, but these were all neutrals. No British ships were found. On 31 July one of the Arados was lost in an accident. The next day, Admiral Hipper encountered the Finnish freighter Ester Thorden, which was found to be carrying 1.75 t (1.72 long tons; 1.93 short tons) of gold. The ship was seized and sent to occupied Norway with a prize crew. On 5 August Admiral Hipper received orders to return immediately to Germany. The cruiser first replenished from Dithmarschen before heading for the Norwegian coast. On 10 August Admiral Hipper arrived in Wilhelmshaven.

=== Operation Nordseetour ===
The overhaul in Wilhelmshaven was completed on 9 September and with a new commanding officer, Wilhelm Meisel, the cruiser made ready to participate in Operation Sea Lion, the planned invasion of the United Kingdom. Admiral Hipper's role would have been a diversionary foray into the North Sea, Operation Herbstreise or "Autumn Journey", with the aim of luring the British Home Fleet away from the intended invasion routes in the English Channel. Following the postponement of that operation, on 24 September the ship left Wilhelmshaven on a mission to break out into the Atlantic Ocean to raid merchant traffic. The engine oil feed system caught fire and was severely damaged. The fire forced the crew to shut down the ship's propulsion system until the blaze could be brought under control; this rendered Admiral Hipper motionless for several hours on the open sea. British reconnaissance failed to locate the ship, and after the fire was extinguished, she returned to Hamburg's Blohm & Voss shipyard, where repairs lasted slightly over a week.

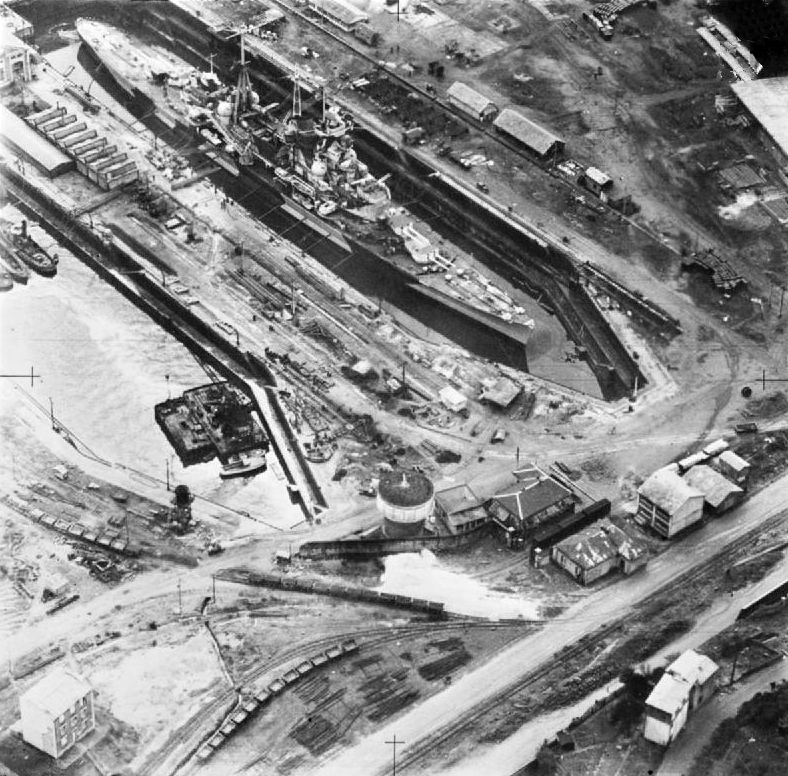
Admiral Hipper in dry dock in Brest, photographed by a PRU Spitfire in 1941

The ship made a second attempt to break out into the Atlantic, designated Operation Nordseetour. On 30 November Admiral Hipper, escorted by five torpedo boats, left Germany for Bergen in Norway, where she refueled from the tanker Wollin on 1 December. The German cruiser then proceeded towards a position South of Jan Mayen, where she refueled several times from the tanker Adria whilst waiting for convenient bad weather to break through the Denmark Strait into the North Atlantic. During a gale on the night of 6 December, she navigated the Denmark Strait undetected. After a refueling by the tanker Friedrich Breme on 12 December, Meisel started searching for the convoy HX 94, which according to B-Dienst intelligence was nearby. Admiral Hipper encountered a few independent sailing vessels but as his orders were to attack only convoys, Meisel did not attack and remained undetected. In deteriorating weather, the convoy was not found. Between refueling twice from the Friedrich Breme on 16 and 20 December, Admiral Hipper searched for the convoys SC 15 and HX 95 but again nothing was found because of bad weather. Finally Meisel decided to leave the North Atlantic convoy lanes and operate on the shipping lanes between the United Kingdom and West Africa, where the B-Dienst had reported the convoys SL 58 and SLS 58. An Arado floatplane was launched to search for the convoys, but the plane went missing and nothing was found. On 23 December the Admiral Hipper operated between the Azores and Spain.

At dusk on 24 December, Admiral Hipper, using her DeTe radar, detected Convoy WS 5A some 700 nautical miles (1,300 km; 810 mi) west of Cape Finisterre. She shadowed the convoy during the night with her radar with the intention of attacking at dawn. During the night a large escort was visually detected and unsuccessfully attacked with three torpedoes. Convoy WS 5A was not a regular merchant convoy, but rather a heavily guarded troopship convoy consisting of twenty ships. Five of the twenty ships were allocated to Operation Excess. The convoy was protected by a powerful escort composed of the heavy cruiser Berwick and the light cruisers Bonaventure and Dunedin. The aircraft carriers Furious and Argus were part of the convoy, but not operational as they were transferring crated aircraft. When Admiral Hipper attacked in the morning, she was surprised to make contact with Berwick. A torpedo attack on Berwick failed, but with her main guns she badly damaged the 13,994 GRT transport Empire Trooper, and lightly damaged the freighter Arabistan, before spotting other ships steaming toward her. Believing these ships to be destroyers preparing for a torpedo attack, she quickly withdrew, using her main guns to keep the escorts at bay. Ten minutes later, Berwick reappeared off Admiral Hipper's port bow; the German cruiser fired several salvos from her rear turrets and scored hits on the British cruiser's rear turrets, waterline, and forward superstructure. Admiral Hipper then disengaged, to prevent the 'British destroyers' from closing to launch a torpedo attack.

By this time Admiral Hipper was running low on fuel, and so she put into Brest in occupied France on 27 December, escorted by the torpedo boat Jaguar. While en route, Admiral Hipper encountered and sank the independent sailing 6,078 GRT passenger ship Jumna on 25 December. Another round of routine maintenance work was effected while the ship was in Brest, readying her for another sortie into the Atlantic shipping lanes. On 4 January Admiral Hipper was detected by British air reconnaissance in Brest. The same night a major air raid was mounted with 53 Vickers Wellington, Armstrong Whitworth Whitley and Handley Page Hampden bombers, but due to cloud cover and heavy Flak these were unsuccessful. On the night of 10 January there was a smaller attack with twelve Whitleys, followed two nights later by an attack with 26 Wellingtons and Hampdens, but none of these caused any serious damage. The British failed to detect the departure of Admiral Hipper from Brest on 1 February and continued the attacks. On 4 February a Wellington wrongly claimed a hit on a cruiser in Brest.

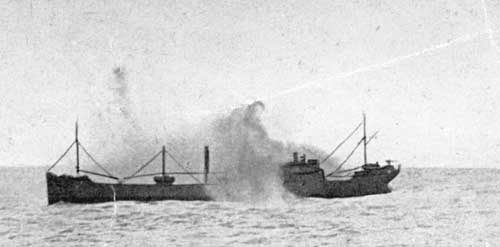
Admiral Hipper firing at Borgestad belonging to convoy SLS-64

=== Second Atlantic operation ===
The Kriegsmarine had initially sought to send the battleships Scharnhorst and Gneisenau to operate in concert with Admiral Hipper, but Gneisenau suffered storm damage in December that prevented the participation of the two ships. Repairs were effected quickly, however, and the two battleships embarked upon a second attempt at the end of January. On 1 February 1941, Admiral Hipper embarked on her second Atlantic sortie, with orders to operate on the convoy lanes between the United Kingdom and West-Africa. The ship was allowed to operate against both lightly escorted convoys and independent sailing vessels, with the hope that her appearance in these waters would draw away British forces guarding the Denmark Strait, thus making it easier for Scharnhorst and Gneisenau to break out into the Atlantic. Between 4 and 10 February Admiral Hipper patrolled off the Azores but no ships were found. She was refueled several times by the tanker Spichern. Upon learning that the British Force H had sortied from Gibraltar deep into the Mediterranean to bombard La Spezia, Meisel understood that the convoys between the UK, Gibraltar and West Africa were left uncovered with heavy units and he decided to operate closer to Gibraltar, where U-boat and Luftwaffe units had attacked convoy HG 53. On 11 February, Admiral Hipper encountered and sank the straggling 1,236 GRT English ship Iceland. That evening around midnight, Admiral Hipper's radar picked up the unescorted convoy SLS 64, which contained nineteen merchant ships. The following morning, posing as a British cruiser, she approached the convoy to close distance before opening fire at 06:19. The surprised ships dispersed at once. At the start of the fight Meisel remained three to five km distant from the ships, but once ammunition began running low he gave the order to close in, in order to fire more accurately. After ships were hit with cannon fire and stopped, they were finished off with torpedoes. Admiral Hipper fired all of her twelve torpedoes and claimed all torpedoes had hit. At 07:18 only six ships were still in sight, of which only two were steaming. Meisel decided to break off the fight and depart before British forces closed in. The British reported only seven ships lost, totaling 32,806 GRT along with damage to two more. (Note: The English ships Warlaby (4,876 GRT), Westbury (4,712 GRT), Oswestry Grange (4,684 GRT), Shrewsbury (4,542 GRT), Derrynane (4896 GRT), the Greek ship Perseus (5,172 GRT) and the Norwegian ship Borgestad ( 3,924 GRT) were sunk. The English ship Lornaston (4934 GRT) and the Greek ship Kaliiopi (4,965 GRT) were heavily damaged.) The Germans claimed Admiral Hipper had sunk thirteen of the nineteen freighters totalling 79,000 GRT, while some survivors reported fourteen ships of the convoy had been sunk.

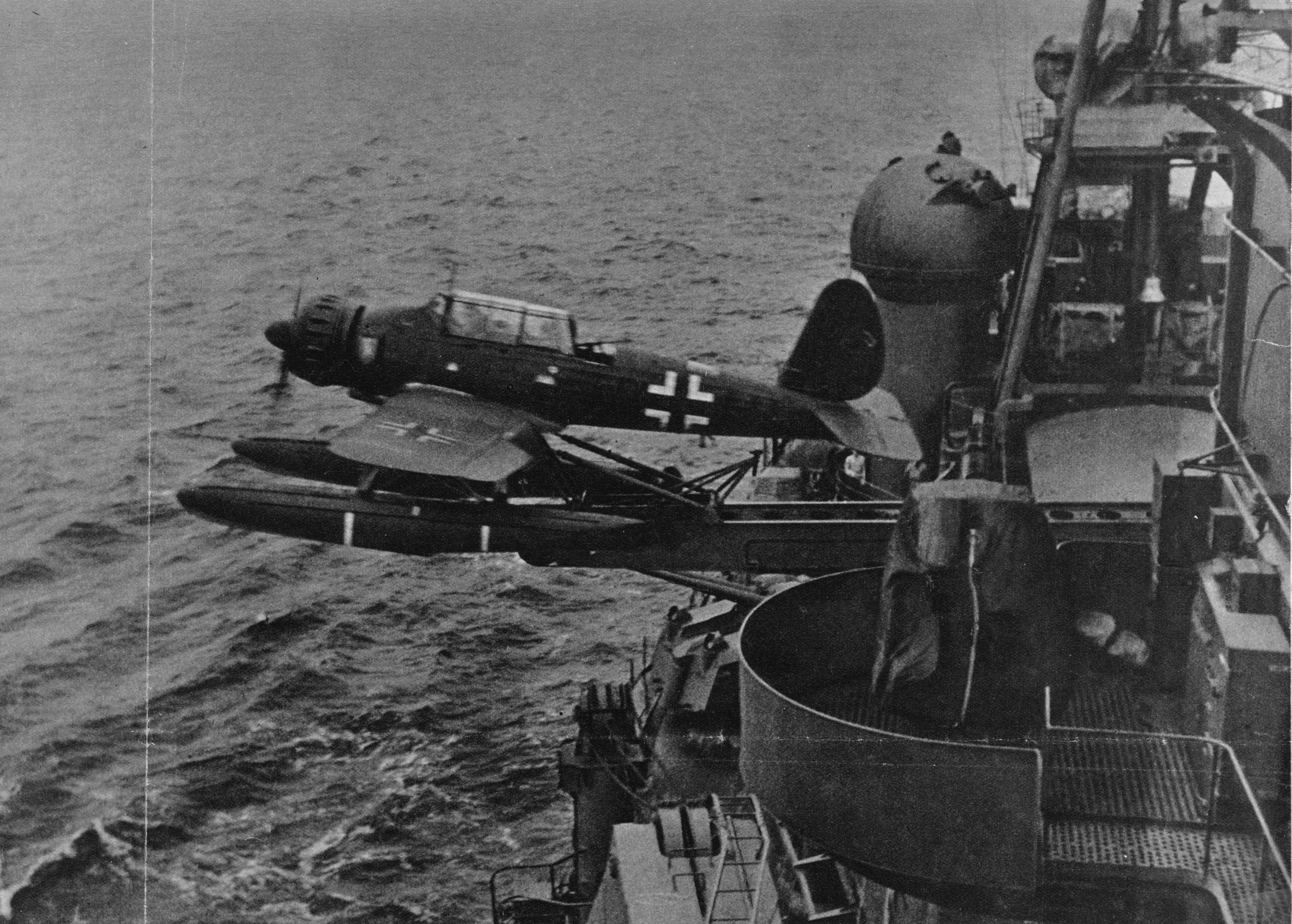
One of Admiral Hipper's three Arado Ar 196 seaplanes being launched in 1942

Following the attack on convoy SLS 64, Admiral Hipper's fuel stocks were running low. Meisel feared that approaching British forces would cut him off from tankers waiting in the Azores and therefore returned to Brest on 15 February. Since the bigger dry docks had to be kept free for the eventual return of Scharnhorst and Gneisenau, Admiral Hipper was docked in a smaller one, and while moving into it, damaged her starboard screw on uncharted wreckage. A spare screw had to be transported from Kiel, causing additional delay. Meanwhile, British bombers were regularly attacking the port, and the Kriegsmarine therefore decided that Admiral Hipper should return to Germany, where she could be better protected. On 15 March, the ship slipped out of Brest, unobserved, and steered to a rendezvous point South of Greenland with the tanker Thorn. The refueling was delayed to 21 March because of bad weather. Since the heavy cruiser Admiral Scheer was also returning from a raid to Germany around the same time, there was concern that the two ships might hinder each other, so Admiral Hipper was given orders to make the breakthrough via the Denmark Strait before 28 March. She managed to do so on 24 March. and two days later stopped to refuel in Bergen. By 28 March, the cruiser was docked in Kiel, having made the entire journey without being detected by the British.

Upon arrival, the ship went into the Deutsche Werke shipyard for an extensive overhaul, which lasted seven months. Raeder intended to continue to send the Admiral Hipper on North Atlantic raids, and as her operations so far had been dominated by the constant need to refuel, it was decided to increase her fuel capacity from 3050 to 3700 cubic meters. The aircraft hangar was also adapted at this time; the large hangar for two floatplanes with folding wings had proven difficult to handle in operations, and was replaced by a smaller hangar for just one floatplane, the spare room being taken up by refueling gear and extra food storage. After completion of the refit, Admiral Hipper conducted sea trials in the Baltic before putting into Gotenhafen on 21 December for some minor work. In January 1942, the ship had her steam turbines overhauled at the Blohm & Voss shipyard; a degaussing coil was fitted to the ship's hull during this overhaul. By March, the ship was again fully operational. By then, however, the strategic situation had altered completely: due to British air reconnaissance and developments in radar it was no longer viable to execute raids in the North Atlantic. Instead the German surface fleet concentrated in Norway as a deterrent against an Allied invasion and to attack Arctic convoys to Russia.

=== Deployment to Norway ===
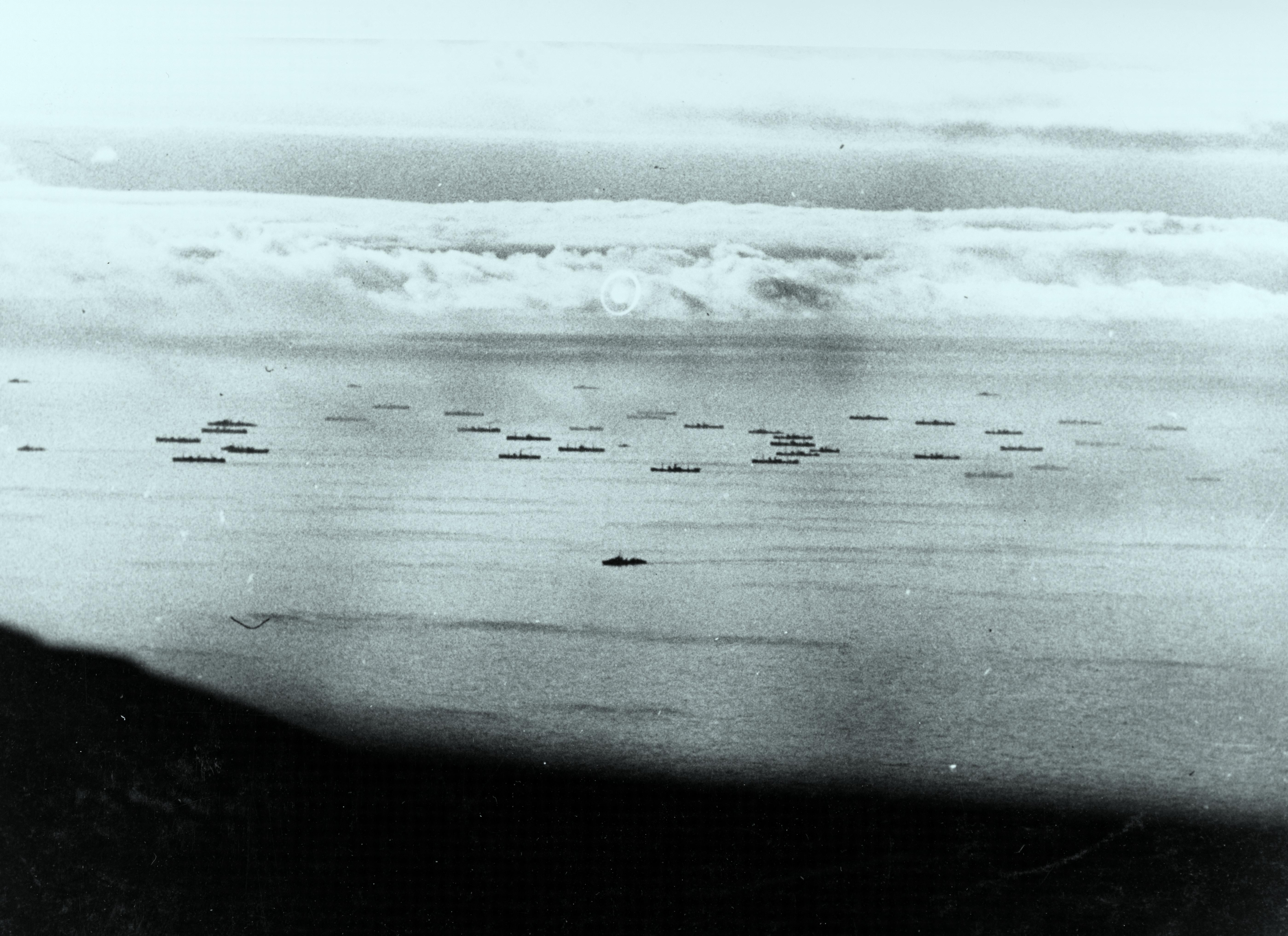
The convoy PQ-17, target for Operation Rösselsprung.

On 19 March 1942, Admiral Hipper steamed to Trondheim, escorted by the destroyers Z24, Z26, and Z30 and the torpedo boats T15, T16, and T17. Several British submarines were patrolling the area, but failed to intercept the German flotilla. Admiral Hipper and her escorts reached their destination on 21 March. There, they joined the heavy cruisers Admiral Scheer and Prinz Eugen, though the latter had been torpedoed by the British submarine Trident on 23 February and returned to Germany for repairs on 16 May. At the same time the heavy cruiser Lützow (the former Deutschland) transferred from Germany to Norway. In begin March, the battleship Tirpitz had been operating against the Arctic convoy PQ 12 during Operation Sportpalast and had depleted the already very low German fuel stocks. As a result, operations above destroyer level were impossible and the Admiral Hipper remained in port for the next months.

In July fuel stocks were sufficient to allow operations again and the Germans intended to attack the next convoy PQ 17 with the complete surface fleet in Operation Rösselsprung. On 1 July the convoy was located by the B-Dienst and detected by U-boats. The next day, the first stage of Operation Rösselsprung was set in motion when German forces concentrated in Altafjord from where they could sortie against the convoy. On 2 July, Admiral Hipper, Tirpitz, the destroyers Z6 Theodor Riedel, Z10 Hans Lody, Z14 Friedrich Ihn and Z20 Karl Galster, and the torpedo boats T7 and T15 left Trondheim for Altafjord, followed on 3 July by the cruisers Lützow and Admiral Scheer and the destroyers Z24, Z27, Z28, Z29, Z30 and Z4 Richard Beitzen coming from Narvik. In order to avoid British reconnaissance, the German fleet did not steer into open waters but remained close to the coast. In fog Lützow ran aground in the narrow Tjeldsundet, and the destroyers Z6 Theodor Riedel, Z10 Hans Lody and Z20 Karl Galster struck uncharted rocks at Grimsöy in Vestfjorden and all these ships fell out for the operation. The destroyers Z15 Erich Steinbrinck and Z16 Friedrich Eckoldt arrived also on 3 July in Altafjord.

Escorting the convoy were the battleships HMS Duke of York and USS Washington and the aircraft carrier HMS Victorious. Since aircraft from the Victorious had nearly torpedoed Tirpitz during Operation Sportpalast, Hitler explicitly forbade to launch the next stage of operation Rösselsprung, the actual attack on the convoy, as long as the aircraft carrier was not disabled by the Luftwaffe. Swedish intelligence had meanwhile reported the German departures to the British Admiralty, which ordered the convoy to disperse in the evening of 4 July. In the morning of 5 July the Germans became aware that the escorts were withdrawing and the merchants were continuing independently. The second stage of Operation Rösselsprung was initiated at 11:37 and Admiral Hipper left Altafjord together with the German fleet. During the evening it became clear that they had been detected and reported by the British submarine HMS Unshaken and a Consolidated PBY Catalina from No. 201 Squadron RAF, although an attack by the Soviet submarine K-21 went unnoticed. The Germans aborted the operation and left the merchants over to the U-boats and the Luftwaffe, which sank 21 of the 34 fleeing transports.

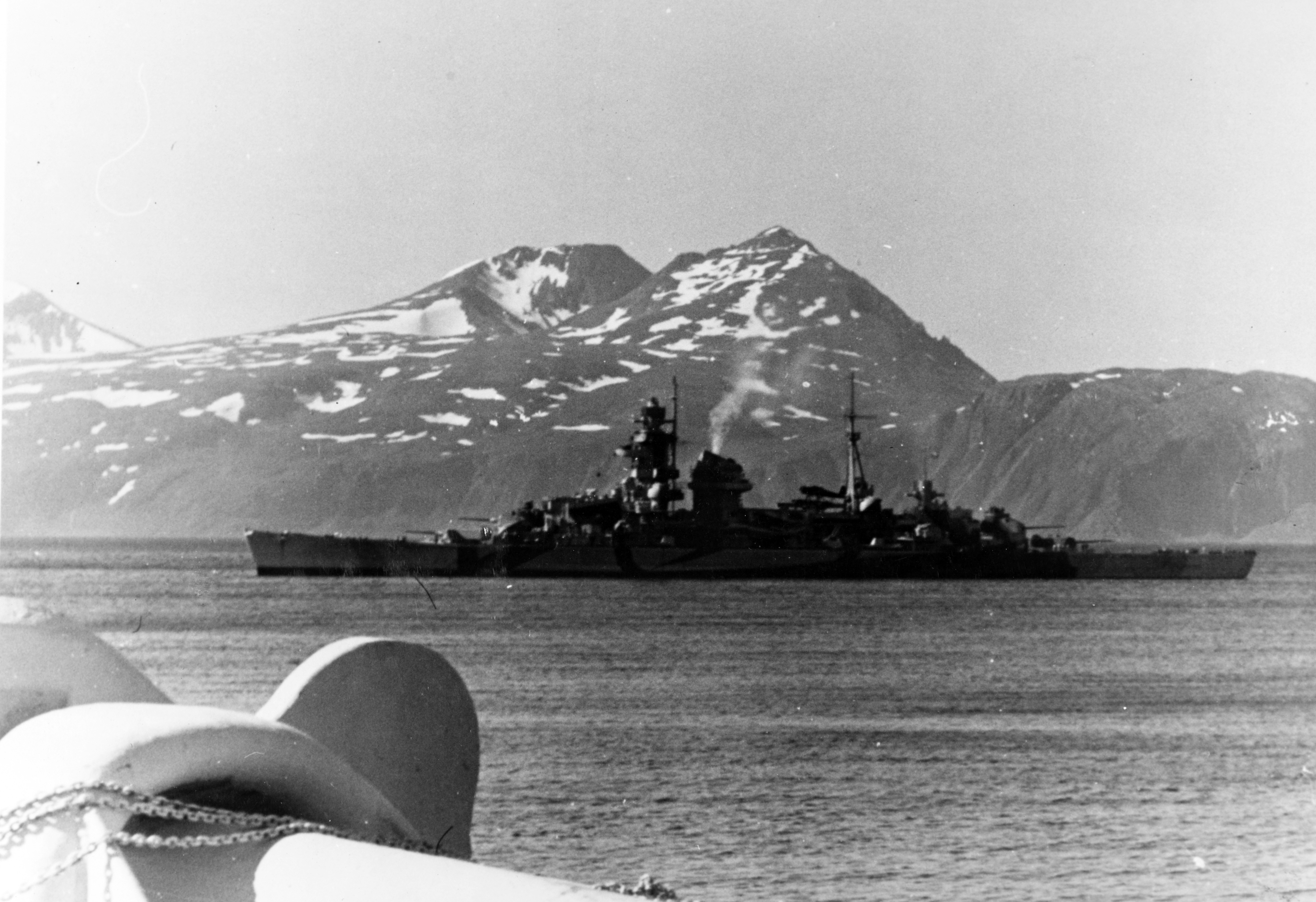
Admiral Hipper in Norwegian waters, circa 1942

Due to commitments in the Mediterranean with Operation Pedestal, the Royal Navy was not able to provide sufficient escorts for the next Arctic convoy and the sailing of convoy PQ-18 was delayed until September. The convoy was located on 8 September and on 10 September the Germans set Operation Doppelschlag in motion: all available surface units were ordered to the Altafjord from where they would launch their attack against the convoy. Admiral Hipper left Narvik together with the Admiral Scheer, the light cruiser Köln and the destroyers Z23 and Z27, and arrived on 11 September in the Altafjord. Tirpitz and Lützow were under repair and remained in Narvik. On their way, the ships were first detected by the British submarine Tribune. and then unsuccessfully attacked by the British submarine Tigris. The Norwegian submarine HNoMS Uredd and the British submarine Unshaken sighted the German fleet but were unable to attack. The destroyers Z4 Richard Beitzen, Z16 Friedrich Eckoldt, Z29 and Z30 also arrived in Altafjord on 11 September, but then the operation was once more cancelled because Hitler did not want to risk losses to the surface fleet.

In Operation Zarin, the cruiser laid a minefield on 24–28 September off the north-west coast of Novaya Zemlya, escorted by the destroyers Z23, Z28, Z29, and Z30 The goal of the operation was to funnel merchant traffic further south, closer to the reach of German naval units in Norway. After her return to port, Admiral Hipper was transferred to Bogen Bay near Narvik for repairs to her propulsion system.

On 28–29 October, Admiral Hipper and the destroyers Friedrich Eckoldt and Richard Beitzen were transferred further north from Narvik to the Altafjord. Because the Allies could not provide sufficient escorts for the next Arctic convoy PQ-19, they decided to cancel the convoy and instead on 29 October thirteen freighters sailed independently from Iceland to the USSR. From the USSR 23 empty ships also tried to return independently to Iceland. Against this traffic the Germans started Operation Hoffnung on 5 November: Admiral Hipper and the 5th Destroyer Flotilla, composed of Z27, Z30, Z4 Richard Beitzen, and Z16 Friedrich Eckoldt, patrolled for Allied shipping in the Arctic. Vizeadmiral Oskar Kummetz commanded the squadron from Admiral Hipper. On 7 November, the cruiser's Arado floatplane located the 7,925 GRT Soviet tanker Donbass and its escort, the auxiliary warship BO-78. Kummetz dispatched the destroyer Z27 to sink the two Soviet ships. On 9 November the ships are back in the Kaafjord.

==== Battle of the Barents Sea ====
In December 1942, convoy traffic to the Soviet Union resumed. Raeder ordered a plan, Operation Regenbogen, to use the available surface units in Norway to launch an attack on the convoys. The first convoy of the month, Convoy JW 51A, passed to the Soviet Union without incident. However, the second, Convoy JW 51B, was spotted by the submarine U-354 south of Bear Island. Raeder ordered the forces assigned to Operation Regenbogen into action. Admiral Hipper, again served as Kummetz's flagship; the squadron comprised Lützow and the destroyers Friederich Eckoldt, Richard Beitzen, Theodor Riedel, Z29, Z30, and Z31. The force left Altafjord at 18:00 on 30 December, under orders to avoid confrontation with even an equal opponent.

Kummetz's plan was to divide his force in half; he would take Admiral Hipper and three destroyers north of the convoy to attack it and draw away the escorts. Lützow and the remaining three destroyers would attack the undefended convoy from the south. At 09:15 on 31 December, the British destroyer Obdurate spotted the three destroyers screening Admiral Hipper; the Germans opened fire first. Four of the other five destroyers escorting the convoy rushed to join in, while Achates laid a smoke screen to cover the convoy. Admiral Hipper fired several salvos at Achates, raining shell splinters on the destroyer that severed steam lines and reduced her speed to 15 knots (28 km/h; 17 mph). Kummetz then turned back north to draw the destroyers away. Captain Robert Sherbrooke, the Senior Officer escort, left two destroyers to cover the convoy while he took the remaining four to pursue Admiral Hipper.

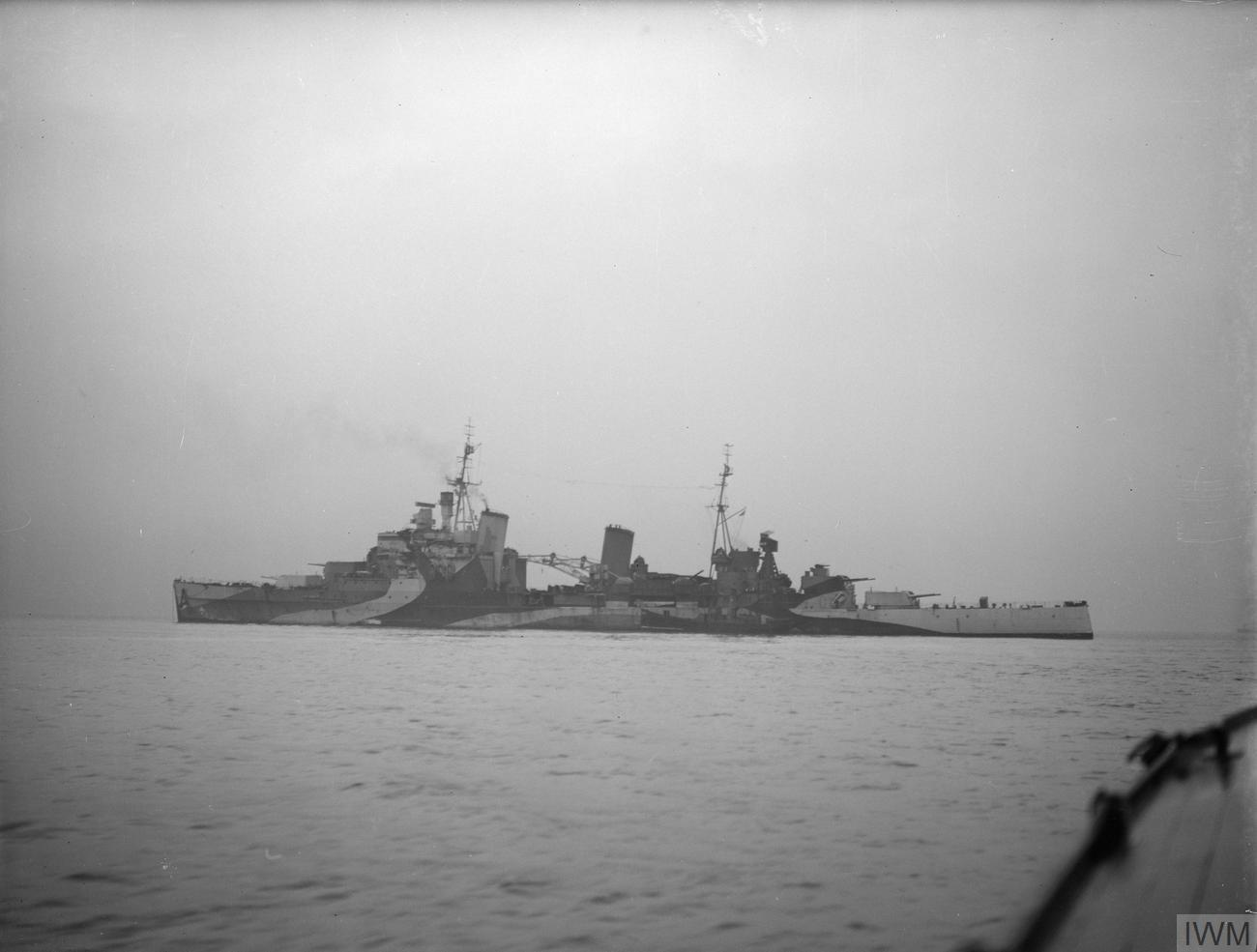
The light cruiser Sheffield after the battle of the Barents Sea

Force R (Rear Admiral Robert Burnett) with the cruisers Sheffield and Jamaica, standing by in distant support of the Allied convoy, raced to the scene. The cruisers engaged Admiral Hipper, which had been firing to port at the destroyer Obedient. Burnett's ships approached from Admiral Hipper's starboard side and achieved surprise. In the initial series of salvos from the British cruisers, Admiral Hipper was hit three times. One of the hits damaged the ship's propulsion system; the No. 3 boiler filled with a mix of oil and water, which forced the crew to turn off the starboard turbine engine. This reduced her speed to 23 knots (43 km/h; 26 mph). The other two hits started a fire in her aircraft hangar. She fired a salvo at the cruisers before turning toward them, her escorting destroyers screening her with smoke. After emerging from the smoke screen, Admiral Hipper was again engaged by Burnett's cruisers. Owing to the uncertainty over the condition of his flagship and the ferocity of the British defense, Kummetz issued the following order at 10:37, "Break off action and retire to the west". Mistakenly identifying Sheffield as Admiral Hipper, the destroyer Friederich Eckoldt approached too close and was sunk.

Lützow closed to within 3 nmi (5.6 km; 3.5 mi) of the convoy but due to poor visibility, held fire. She then received Kummetz's order, and turned west to rendezvous with Admiral Hipper. Lützow inadvertently came alongside Sheffield and Jamaica, and after identifying them as hostile, engaged them. The British cruisers turned toward Lützow and came under fire from both German cruisers. Admiral Hipper's firing was more accurate and quickly straddled Sheffield, though the British cruiser escaped unscathed. Burnett quickly decided to withdraw in the face of the superior German firepower; his ships were armed with 6 in (150 mm) guns, while Admiral Hipper and Lützow carried 20.3 cm (8.0 in) and 28 cm (11 in) guns, respectively.

Based on the order issued at the start of the operation to avoid action with a force equal in strength to his, poor visibility and the damage to his flagship, Kummetz decided to abort the attack. In the course of the battle, the British destroyer Achates was sunk by the damage inflicted by Admiral Hipper. The Germans also sank the minesweeper Bramble and damaged the destroyers Onslow, Obedient and Obdurate. The British sank Friederich Eckoldt, damaged Admiral Hipper and forced the Germans to abandon the attack on the convoy. After the operation, a furious Hitler proclaimed that the Kriegsmarine's surface forces would be paid off and dismantled, their guns to be used to reinforce the fortifications of the Atlantic Wall. Admiral Karl Dönitz, Raeder's successor, persuaded Hitler to retain the surface fleet.

After returning to Altafjord, emergency repairs to Admiral Hipper were effected, which allowed her to return to Bogen Bay on 23 January 1943. That day, Admiral Hipper, Köln, and the destroyer Richard Beitzen left Altafjord to return to Germany. The three ships stopped in Narvik on 25 January, and in Trondheim from 30 January to 2 February. After resuming the voyage south, the ships searched for Norwegian blockade runners in the Skagerrak on 6 February before putting into port at Kiel on 8 February. On 28 February, the ship was decommissioned in accordance with Hitler's decree.

=== Fate ===
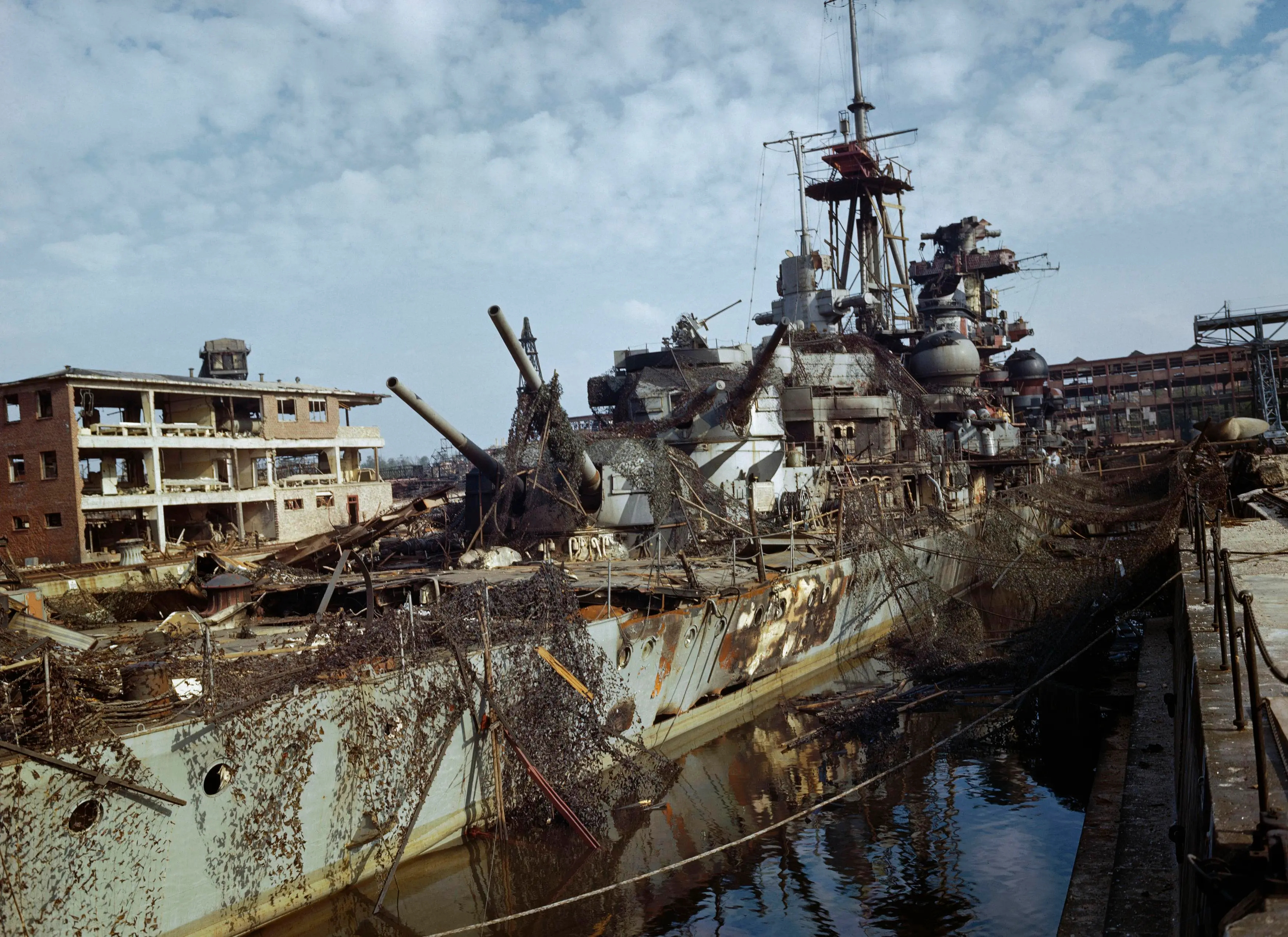
Admiral Hipper in dry dock at Kiel on 19 May 1945, after VE Day; both camouflage netting and bomb damage can be seen

Admiral Hipper received only basic repairs so that in April the ship could be towed to Pillau in the Baltic, to put her out of the reach of Allied bombers. On 1 March 1944 the Admiral Hipper was recommissioned in her damaged state as a training ship for cadets in Gotenhafen. During the next five months Admiral Hipper executed gunnery and sea training in the Baltic. In September she was reported conditionally operational and on 27 October the cadets graduated. In November there were plans drafted to use her for shore bombardments, but as the Soviet army pushed the Germans back on the Eastern Front, her crew was drafted into construction work on the defenses of the city, further impairing Admiral Hipper's ability to enter active service. The Royal Air Force also laid an extensive minefield around the port, which forced the ship to remain in the harbor.

By the end of 1944, the ship was due for another overhaul; work was to have lasted for three months. The Soviet Army had advanced so far, however, that it was necessary to move the ship farther away from the front, despite the fact that she had only one working turbine. On 29 January 1945, the ship left Gotenhafen with 1,377 refugees embarked, escorted by the torpedo boat T36. On the evening of the 30th, Admiral Hipper received a distress call from the sinking transport Wilhelm Gustloff, which was also carrying refugees. The cruiser did not stop to pick up survivors due to the threat of the submarine that sank Wilhelm Gustloff; it would instead become one of the worst maritime disasters in history.

Admiral Hipper arrived in Kiel on 2 February and entered the Germaniawerft shipyard for refitting. On 3 April, RAF bombers attacked the harbor and hit the Admiral Hipper with one bomb which failed to penetrate the armor deck but caused six deaths amongst the crew. In the night of 9 April the RAF attacked the port with 591 heavy bombers. The bombers hit several ships in the harbor: Admiral Scheer capsized, the light cruiser Emden was hit, and Admiral Hipper was severely damaged by three bomb hits. Munitions for her heavy artillery were brought aboard with the idea to operate her as a floating battery, but her crew scuttled the wrecked ship at her moorings at 04:25 on 3 May. In July 1945, after the end of the war, Admiral Hipper was raised and towed to Heikendorfer Bay and subsequently broken up for scrap in 1948–1952. Her bell was on display at the National Maritime Museum in Greenwich. The bell has since been returned to Germany and is on display at the Laboe Naval Memorial near Kiel.
