= German destroyer Z29 =

Destroyer

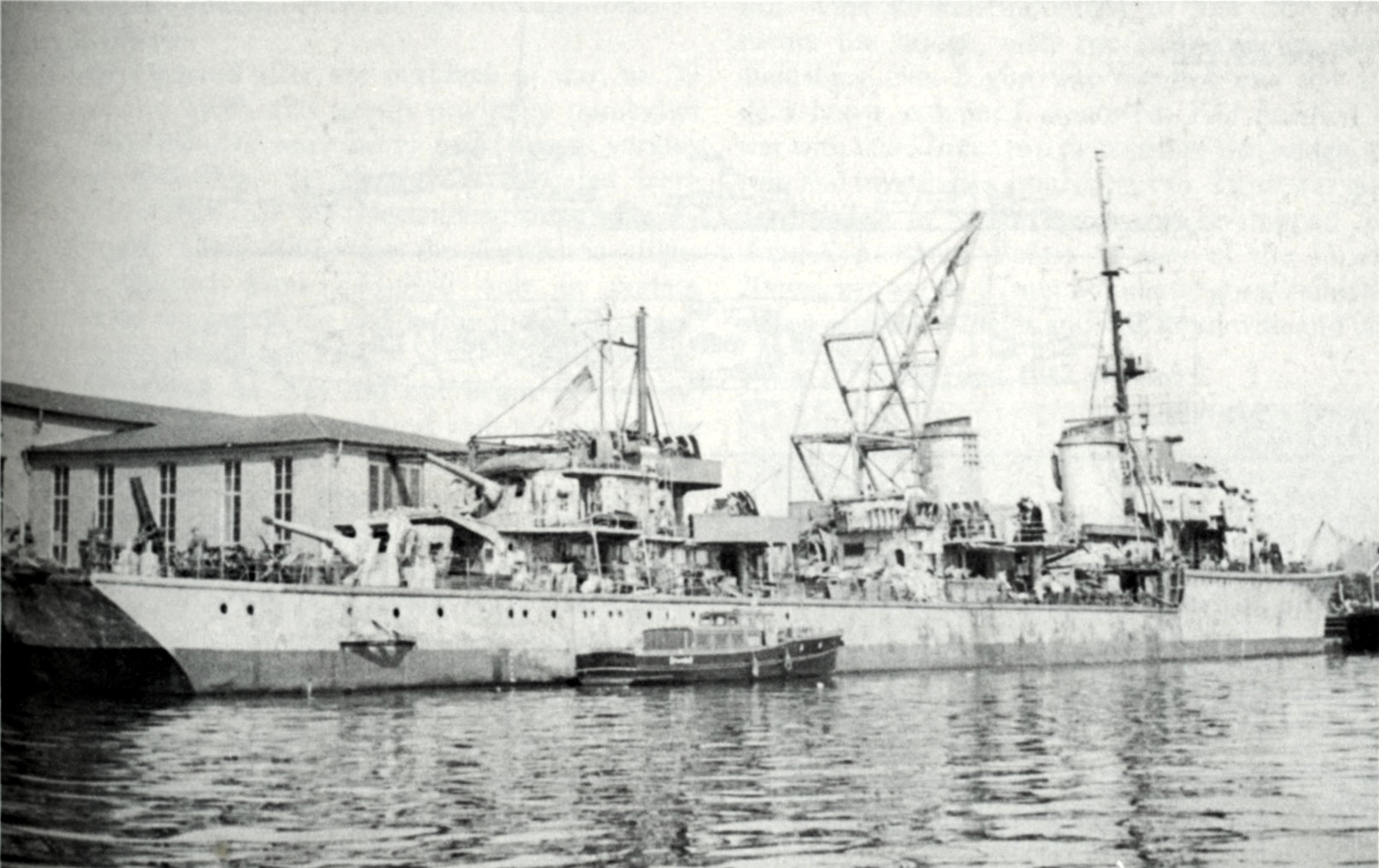
- Z29 in 1945

History

Nazi Germany
- Name: Z29
- Ordered: 23 April 1938
- Builder: AG Weser (Deschimag), Bremen
- Yard number: W963
- Laid down: 21 March 1940
- Launched: 15 October 1940
- Completed: 9 July 1941
- Captured: 6 May 1945
- Fate: Scuttled, 16 December 1946

General characteristics (as built)
- Class & type: Type 1936A destroyer
- Displacement: 2,657 long tons (2,700 t) (standard); 3,691 long tons (3,750 t) (deep load)
- Length: 127 m (416 ft 8 in) (o/a)
- Beam: 12 m (39 ft 4 in)
- Draft: 4.62 m (15 ft 2 in)
- Installed power: 6 × water-tube boilers; 70,000 PS (51,000 kW; 69,000 shp)
- Propulsion: 2 × shafts; 2 × geared steam turbine sets
- Speed: 36 knots (67 km/h; 41 mph)
- Range: 2,950 nmi (5,460 km; 3,390 mi) at 19 knots (35 km/h; 22 mph)
- Complement: 332
- Armament: 4 × single 15 cm (5.9 in) guns; 2 × twin 3.7 cm (1.5 in) AA guns; 7 × single 2 cm (0.8 in) AA guns; 2 × quadruple 53.3 cm (21 in) torpedo tubes; 60 mines; 4 × depth charge throwers

Z29 was one of fifteen Type 1936A destroyers built for the Kriegsmarine (German Navy) during World War II. Completed in 1941, she took part in the Channel Dash in early 1942 as flagship of the escort force. Despite this venture to France, the ship spent most of the war in Norwegian waters, escorting German ships and laying minefields. Z29 participated in the indecisive Battle of the Barents Sea at the end of the year, during which she helped to sink a British minesweeper. The ship was damaged during the raid on the island of Spitsbergen in September 1943. Z29 was damaged by British aircraft attacking the battleship Tirpitz in July 1944. The ship escorted troop convoys from northern Norway when the Germans began evacuating the area beginning in October until she began an extensive refit in December.

The war ended before the refit was completed and the ship was surrendered to the Allies in Germany. She was allocated to the United States when they divided up the surviving ships of the Kriegsmarine in late 1945. Still not fully seaworthy, Z29 was scuttled by the Americans in late 1946.

== Design and description ==
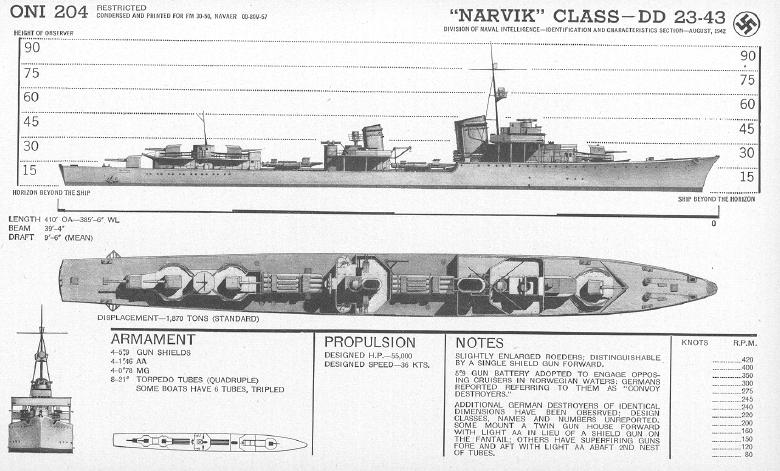
Wartime Allied recognition manual drawing of the Type 36A destroyer

The Type 1936A destroyers were slightly larger than the preceding Type 1936 class and had a heavier armament. They had an overall length of 127 meters (416 ft 8 in) and were 121.9 meters (399 ft 11 in) long at the waterline. The ships had a beam of 12 meters (39 ft 4 in), and a maximum draft of 4.62 meters (15 ft 2 in). They displaced 2,657 long tons (2,700 t) at standard load and 3,691 long tons (3,750 t) at deep load. The two Wagner geared steam turbine sets, each driving one propeller shaft, were designed to produce 70,000 PS (51,000 kW; 69,000 shp) using steam provided by six Wagner water-tube boilers for a designed speed of 36 knots (67 km/h; 41 mph). Z29 carried enough fuel oil to give her a range of 2,950 nautical miles (5,460 km; 3,390 mi) at 19 knots (35 km/h; 22 mph). Her crew consisted of 11 officers and 321 sailors.

The ship carried four 15-centimeter (5.9 in) TbtsK C/36 guns in single mounts with gun shields, one forward of the superstructure and three aft. They were designated No. 1 to 4 from front to rear. Her anti-aircraft armament consisted of four 3.7-centimeter (1.5 in) C/30 guns in two twin mounts abreast the rear funnel and seven 2-centimeter (0.8 in) C/30 guns in single mounts. Z29 carried eight above-water 53.3-centimeter (21 in) torpedo tubes in two power-operated mounts. Two reloads were provided for each mount. She had four depth charge launchers and mine rails could be fitted on the rear deck that had a maximum capacity of 60 mines. 'GHG' (Gruppenhorchgerät) passive hydrophones were fitted to detect submarines and an S-Gerät sonar was also probably fitted. The ship was equipped with a FuMO 24/25 radar set above the bridge.

=== Modifications ===
A FuMO 63 Hohentwiel radar was installed in 1944–1945 in lieu of the aft searchlight. During her 1944–1945 refit, Z29 exchanged her single forward 15 cm gun for a 15 cm LC/38 twin-gun turret as used in her sister ships. This exacerbated the Type 36A's tendency to take water over the bow and reduced their speed to 32.8 knots (60.7 km/h; 37.7 mph). No. 3 gun was also removed to make room for additional AA guns under the Barbara program. By the end of the war, her anti-aircraft suite consisted of two experimental 5.5-centimeter (2.2 in) Gerät 58 guns (probably), nine 3.7 cm guns in single and twin mounts and twenty 2 cm weapons in single, twin, and quadruple mounts. Most, if not all, of the 3.7 cm guns were to be the faster-firing Flak M42 model. (Note: Sources differ on the number of AA guns aboard the ship. Koop and Schmolke do not provide overall totals, but claim that the numbers given by Whitley were in addition to the original weapons. Gröner says that the ship mounted eleven 3.7 cm and twenty-nine 2 cm guns at war's end.)

== Service history ==
Z29 was ordered from AG Weser (Deschimag) on 23 April 1938. The ship was laid down at Deschimag's Bremen shipyard as yard number W963 on 21 March 1940 and launched on 15 October. The ship commissioned on 25 June 1941 under the command of Korvettenkapitän (Lieutenant Commander) Curt Rechel.

After working up, Z29 was one of the escorts for Tirpitz from the Jade Estuary to Trondheim, Norway and returned to Kiel, Germany from 14 to 17 January 1942. The ship sailed on 27 January for Brest, France, as part of the preparations for the Channel Dash. The German ships departed Brest on 11 February, surprising the British, with Z29 leading the formation as the flagship of the Führer der Zerstörer (Commander of the Destroyer Force), Kapitän zur See (Captain) Erich Bey, who commanded the escorts. British attacks on the German ships were generally ineffective until the battleship Scharnhorst struck a mine off the mouth of the Scheldt Estuary at 15:30. Vizeadmiral (Vice Admiral) Otto Ciliax, overall commander of the German force, summoned Z29 to take him aboard from the immobilized battleship. While the destroyer was attempting to close, she accidentally collided with the battleship's stern, damaging her forecastle, but managed to take off Ciliax. Later that day, a 15 cm shell exploded in one of the aft guns, killing one man, severing oil lines, and knocking out the port turbine. Ciliax transferred to the destroyer Z7 Hermann Schoemann at 18:25 and Z29 proceeded to Wesermünde for repairs.

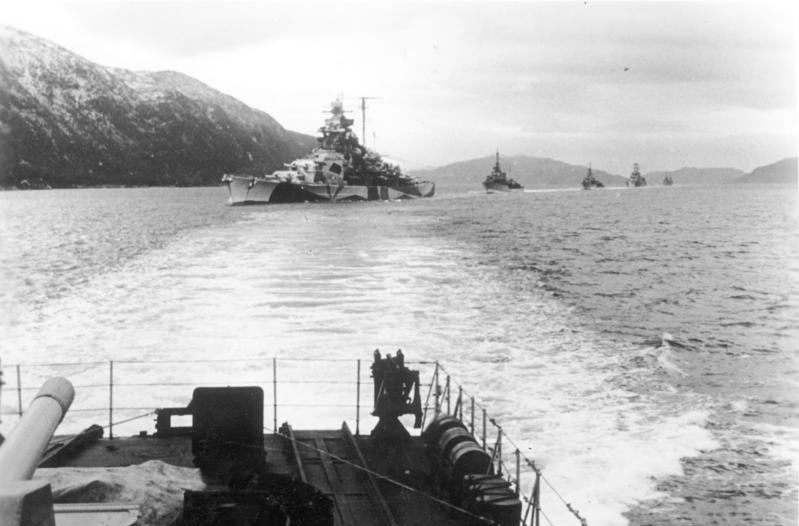
Tirpitz and her escorts, including Z29, en route to Trondheim, Norway, October 1942

After they were completed, she was part of the screen for the heavy cruiser Lützow from 15 to 26 May as she moved from Germany to Bogen Bay, Norway and laid a minefield in the Skagerrak en route. On 5–8 September Z29, her sister Z30, and the destroyer Z4 Richard Beitzen laid a minefield in the Kara Strait between the island of Novaya Zemlya and Vaygach Island. Later that month, she participated in Operation Zarin, a minelaying mission off the coast of Novaya Zemlya from 24 to 28 September, together with Admiral Hipper, and her sisters Z23, Z28, and Z30. On 23–24 October, the ship escorted Tirpitz and the heavy cruiser Admiral Scheer from Bogen Bay to Trondheim and continued to Copenhagen, Denmark, with Admiral Scheer, before returning to the Altafjord with the light cruiser Nürnberg.

=== Battle of the Barents Sea ===
On 30 December, Lützow and the heavy cruiser Admiral Hipper, escorted by six destroyers, including Z29, left Narvik for Operation Regenbogen, an attack on Convoy JW 51B, which was reported by German intelligence to be lightly escorted. Vizeadmiral Oskar Kummetz's plan was to divide his force in half; he would take Admiral Hipper, Z4 Richard Beitzen, Z29 and the destroyer Z16 Friedrich Eckoldt north of the convoy to attack it and draw away the escorts. Lützow and three destroyers would then attack the undefended convoy from the south. The three destroyers separated from Admiral Hipper to search for the convoy, which they found on the morning of 31 December. The destroyer HMS Obdurate spotted them in turn and closed to investigate when the German ships opened fire at a range of 8,000 meters (8,700 yd).

Obdurate turned away to rejoin the convoy without sustaining any damage and the German ships did not pursue as they had been ordered to rejoin Hipper. The Germans found the minesweeper HMS Bramble, which had been detached earlier from the convoy to search for stragglers, as they maneuvered to close with the convoy and the destroyers were ordered to sink her, while Hipper engaged the convoy escorts. This took some time in the poor visibility and Hipper was surprised in the meantime by the British covering force of the light cruisers Sheffield and Jamaica. After sinking Bramble, the German destroyers attempted to rejoin Hipper but had no idea that British cruisers were in the area. About this time Z29 lost contact with the other destroyers. The other two destroyers confused Sheffield with Hipper when they spotted each other at 4,000 meters (4,400 yd) range and were surprised when Sheffield opened fire on Z16 Friedrich Eckoldt with every gun she possessed, sinking her with the loss of all hands. Z29 was one of the escorts for the light cruiser Köln and the damaged Admiral Hipper on 24 January 1943 as they began their voyage to Kiel. The destroyer then began a refit at Wesermünde.

=== Later actions ===
The ship completed working up in July and sailed to Norway on the 22nd, accompanied by the destroyer Z33. The two ships, with the addition of Z31 were assigned to the 4. Zerstörerflotille (4th Destroyer Flotilla) upon their arrival. During Operation Zitronella, the German raid on the island of Spitsbergen in September, they were tasked with fire support for the troops ashore. During the mission Z29 was hit four times by coastal artillery, killing three crewmen and wounding three others. The ship was one of the escorts for Scharnhorst during Operation Ostfront on 25 December, an attempt to intercept the British Convoy JW 55B that was bound for the Soviet Union. All of the battleship's escorts were detached the following day to increase the likelihood of intercepting the convoy and did not participate in the ensuing Battle of North Cape.

Z29 had her boilers repaired at the beginning of 1944 and remained in Norwegian waters through the rest of the year. On 17 July the ship was strafed by aircraft fighters of the Royal Navy's Fleet Air Arm during Operation Mascot, an attack on the battleship Tirpitz, but only suffered superficial damage. Beginning in October, she escorted convoys during Operation Nordlicht, the evacuation of northern Norway. On 16 December Z29 and Z31 laid a minefield off Honningsvaag. A week later, she sailed from Laafjord for Wesermünde to begin a refit that replaced her forward gun with the twin-gun turret and greatly augmented her anti-aircraft armament. The war ended in May 1945, before her refit was completed, and the ship was decommissioned on the 7th.

Z29 was allocated to the United States when the Allies divided the surviving ships of the Kriegsmarine amongst themselves in late 1945. Due to her poor state of repair, the United States Navy declined to make use of the ship and she was scuttled at the entrance to the Skagerrak on 10 June 1946 with a load of chemical munitions aboard.
