= Operation Regenbogen (Arctic) =

1942 German naval sortie in the Arctic Ocean

Operation Rainbow; (Unternehmen Regenbogen)
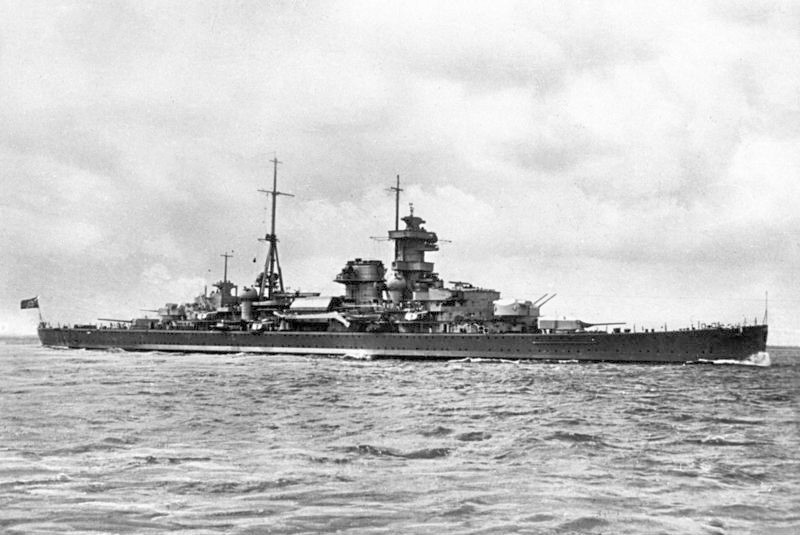
- Admiral Hipper
- Operational scope: Naval operation
- Planned by: Kriegsmarine
- Objective: Destruction of Convoy JW 51B
- Date: Began 30 December 1942
- Executed by: Marinegruppenkommando Nord

Operation Rainbow (Unternehmen Regenbogen) was a 1942 sortie into the Arctic Ocean by warships of the Nazi German Kriegsmarine (German Navy) during the Second World War. The operation culminated in the Battle of the Barents Sea.

== Background ==
=== Signals intelligence ===
==== Ultra ====
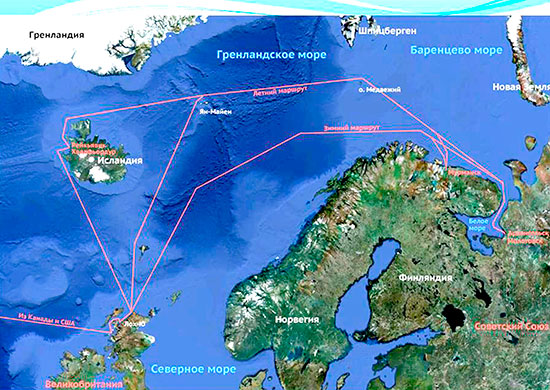
Russian map showing Arctic convoy routes from Britain and Iceland, past Norway to the Barents Sea and northern Russian ports

The British Government Code and Cypher School (GC&CS) based at Bletchley Park housed a small industry of code-breakers and traffic analysts. By June 1941, the German Enigma machine Home Waters (Heimish) settings used by surface ships and U-boats could quickly be read. On 1 February 1942, the Enigma machines used in U-boats in the Atlantic and Mediterranean were changed but German ships and the U-boats in Arctic waters continued with the older Heimish Home Hydra from 1942, Dolphin to the British). By mid-1941, British Y-stations were able to receive and read Luftwaffe W/T transmissions and give advance warning of Luftwaffe operations. In 1941, naval Headache personnel with receivers to eavesdrop on Luftwaffe wireless transmissions were embarked on warships.

==== B-Dienst ====
The rival German Beobachtungsdienst (B-Dienst, Observation Service) of the Kriegsmarine Marinenachrichtendienst (MND, Naval Intelligence Service) had broken several Admiralty codes and cyphers by 1939, which were used to help Kriegsmarine ships elude British forces and provide opportunities for surprise attacks. From June to August 1940, six British submarines were sunk in the Skaggerak using information gleaned from British wireless signals. In 1941, B-Dienst read signals from the Commander in Chief Western Approaches informing convoys of areas patrolled by U-boats, enabling the submarines to move into "safe" zones. B-Dienst had broken Naval Cypher No 3 in February 1942 and by March was reading up to 80 per cent of the traffic, which continued until 15 December 1943. By coincidence, the British lost access to Atlantic U-boat signals when the Shark cypher was introduced and had no information to send in Cypher No 3 that might compromise Ultra.

By February 1942, German naval intelligence had established the evolution of Arctic convoys; PQ convoys departed from Iceland (possibly Seyðisfjörður) heading to the south of Bear Island (Bjørnøya) then eastwards to around 38°40′E, turning south to 70°N then dividing for Murmansk and Arkhangelsk. The reciprocal QP convoys went more to the south or east, ships bound for Britain heading direct for Scotland. The convoys had departed at eight-to-ten day intervals but recently had appeared to be operating on a fifteen-day cycle, voyages lasting nine to ten days, with about ten to fifteen ships apiece. Until the end of February, the British had lost only one ship (SS Waziristan).

=== Arctic Ocean ===
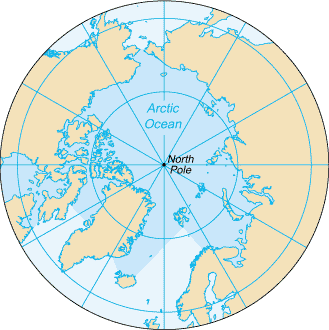
Diagram of the Arctic Ocean

Between Greenland and Norway are some of the most stormy waters of the world's oceans, 890 mi (1,440 km) of water under gales of snow, sleet and hail. The cold Arctic water was met by the Gulf Stream, warm water from the Gulf of Mexico, which became the North Atlantic Drift. Arriving at the south-west of England the drift moves between Scotland and Iceland; north of Norway the drift splits. One stream bears north of Bear Island to Svalbard and a southern stream follows the coast of Murmansk into the Barents Sea. The mingling of cold Arctic water and warmer water of higher salinity generates thick banks of fog for convoys to hide in but the waters drastically reduced the effectiveness of Asdic as U-boats moved in waters of differing temperatures and density.

In winter, polar ice can form as far south as 50 mi (80 km) off the North Cape and in summer it can recede to Svalbard. The area is in perpetual darkness in winter and permanent daylight in the summer and can make air reconnaissance almost impossible. Around the North Cape and in the Barents Sea the sea temperature rarely rises about 4 °C (39 °F) and a man in the water will die unless rescued immediately. The cold water and air makes spray freeze on the superstructure of ships, which has to be removed quickly to avoid the ship becoming top-heavy. Conditions in U-boats were, if anything, worse the boats having to submerge in warmer water to rid the superstructure of ice. Crewmen on watch were exposed to the elements, oil lost its viscosity and nuts froze and sheared off bolts. Heaters in the hull were too demanding of current and could not be run continuously.

=== Arctic convoys ===
A convoy was defined as at least one merchant ship sailing under the protection of at least one warship. At first the British had intended to run convoys to Russia on a forty-day cycle (the number of days between convoy departures) during the winter of 1941–1942, but this was shortened to a ten-day cycle. The round trip to Murmansk for warships was three weeks and each convoy needed a cruiser and two destroyers, which severely depleted the Home Fleet. Convoys left port and rendezvoused with the escorts at sea. A cruiser provided distant cover from a position to the west of Bear Island. Air support was limited to the Norwegian 330 Squadron RNoAF and 269 Squadron RAF of Coastal Command from Iceland, with some help from anti-submarine patrols along the coast of Norway from RAF Sullom Voe in Shetland. Anti-submarine trawlers escorted the convoys on the first part of the outward voyage. Built for Arctic conditions, the trawlers were coal-burning ships and had sufficient endurance. The trawlers were commanded by their peacetime crews and captains with the rank of Skipper, Royal Naval Reserve (RNR) who were used to Arctic conditions, supplied by anti-submarine specialists of the Royal Naval Volunteer Reserve (RNVR). British minesweepers based at Arkhangelsk met the convoys to join the escort for the remainder of the voyage.

In February 1942, the Germans continued the assembly of a force of battleships and heavy cruisers in Norway and the British 10th Cruiser Squadron (Rear-Admiral Harold Burrough) continued its patrols between Bear island and Kola Inlet, a fjord on the Barents Sea and the route to the port of Murmansk. Burrough urged the Soviet naval authorities to implement anti-submarine patrols and provide air cover for convoys, that the Admiralty believed was well within the capacity of the Soviet Navy and Soviet Air Forces to conduct. Tovey, in his analysis of the reinforcement of German navy and air forces in Norway, predicted attacks by the German ships between Jan Mayen and Bear Island, with attacks by U-boats and aircraft east of Bear Island. To increase the effect of the British ships, Tovey wanted the next outbound convoy and its reciprocal return convoy to sail at the same time. The returning 15 ships of Convoy QP 8 were held back on the Kola Inlet for four days and sailed on 1 March as the 18 ships of Convoy PQ 12 sailed from Iceland, the first convoy to have distant cover from the Home Fleet. Coastal Command increased its patrols over Trondheim and B-24 Liberators flew reconnaissance sorties north-eastwards from Iceland.

== Prelude ==
=== Kriegsmarine ===
Kriegsmarine in red, Luftwaffe in blue, North Cape in green

Two U-boats were based in Norway in July 1941, four in September, five in December and two in January 1942, seven in February, nine in March and one in April, 23 boats in all, a number maintained for the rest of the year. Hitler contemplated establishing a unified command but decided against it. The German battleship Tirpitz arrived at Trondheim on 16 January, the first ship of a general move of battleships and cruisers to Norway. British convoys to Russia had received little attention in 1941, since they averaged only eight ships each and the long Arctic winter nights negated even the limited Luftwaffe reconnaissance effort that was available. After Tirpitz, the cruisers Prinz Eugen and Admiral Scheer arrived on 23 February. On 21 March the cruiser Admiral Hipper arrived and on 26 May Lutzow joined the fleet. The U-boats reinforcements to Norway in 1942, along with the big ships, allowed the Kriegsmarine to contemplate more ambitious operations against Arctic convoys.

The arrival of more ships in Norway was of little use without fuel and in November 1941 the oil reserve of the Kriegsmarine stood at 380,000 long tons (390,000 t) with a monthly use of 100,000 long tons (100,000 t) and another 100,000 long tons (100,000 t) delivered to the Regia Marina and a monthly allotment of 84,000 long tons (85,000 t). In February the fuel reserve had declined to 150,000 long tons (150,000 t) and deliveries down to 50,000 long tons (51,000 t), the Channel Dash consuming 20,000 long tons (20,000 t). In March the fuel crisis was such that "fleet operations of any importance [were] absolutely out of the question". In April the fuel shortage worsened with receipts of 8,000 long tons (8,100 t) of fuel from Rumania instead of the expected 46,000 long tons (47,000 t) causing a suspension of operations, even by light forces. (The British followed this crisis through Ultra decrypts with great interest.)

Seekriegsleitung (SKL, Naval Warfare Command) of the Oberkommando der Marine (OKM) had been given contradictory instructions by Adolf Hitler, to hold the ships in Norway ready to repulse a British invasion attempt and to attack Allied Arctic convoys. Defence against an invasion needed the big ships to remain operational when attacks against convoys courted damage and losses, leaving the Kriegsmarine short of ships to counter an invasion. Either way, the navy needed the cooperation of Luftflotte 5 to reconnoitre the convoy route through the Greenland Sea, Norwegian Sea and the Barents Sea and to attack ships at long distance from Norway. Before these matters had been agreed and SKL had issued instructions for the use of Tirpitz and Hipper, General Admiral Rolf Carls, the head of Marine Gruppe Kommando Nord (MGK Nord) approached Grand Admiral Erich Raeder, the head of OKM, for permission to attack the next Arctic convoy with Tirpitz and three destroyers.

=== Luftflotte 5 ===
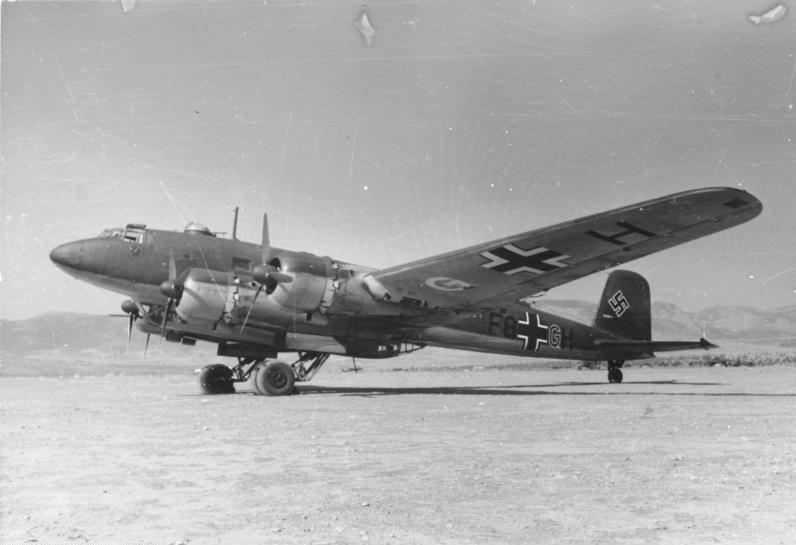
A Focke-Wulf Fw 200 Kondor of KG 40

In mid-1941, Luftflotte 5 (Air Fleet 5) had been re-organised for Operation Barbarossa with Luftgau Norwegen (Air Region Norway) headquartered in Oslo. Fliegerführer Stavanger (Air Commander Stavanger) the centre and north of Norway, Jagdfliegerführer Norwegen (Fighter Leader Norway) commanded the fighter force and Fliegerführer Kerkenes (Oberst [colonel] Andreas Nielsen) in the far north had airfields at Kirkenes and Banak. The Air Fleet had 180 aircraft, sixty of which were reserved for operations on the Karelian Front against the Red Army.

The distance from Banak to Arkhangelsk was 560 mi (900 km) and Fliegerführer Kerkenes had only ten Junkers Ju 88 bombers of Kampfgeschwader 30, thirty Junkers Ju 87 Stuka dive-bombers ten Messerschmitt Bf 109 fighters of Jagdgeschwader 77, five Messerschmitt Bf 110 heavy fighters of Zerstörergeschwader 76, ten reconnaissance aircraft and an anti-aircraft battalion. Sixty aircraft were far from adequate in such a climate and terrain where

...there is no favourable season for operations. (Earl Ziemke [1959] in Claasen [2001])

The emphasis of air operations changed from army support to anti-shipping operations only after March 1942, when Allied Arctic convoys becoming larger and more frequent coincided with the reinforcement of Norway with ships and aircraft and the less extreme climatic conditions of the Arctic summer. On 22 January 1942, Hitler ordered Hermann Goering to reinforce Luftflotte 5 and by the end of the month a new bomber wing was added to the order of battle, with three Staffeln (squadrons) of Heinkel He 111 torpedo-bombers, after the Luftwaffe had overcome opposition from the Kriegsmarine and by July there were 77 torpedo-bombers, about half being Junkers Ju 88s but the first unit did not arrive in the Arctic until late April.

== Plan ==
Bjørnøya (Bear Island) circled in red

Regenbogen was a plan to intercept the next Allied convoy to Murmansk. A patrol line of four U-boats was established off Bear Island and a surface force consisting of the cruisers Admiral Hipper and Lützow with six destroyers was assembled at Altafjord. When a convoy was spotted, the fleet would sail as two battle groups; one to engage the expected cruiser escort and the other to attack the convoy. The German force was handicapped by strict orders from Adolf Hitler not to take excessive risks with the big ships of the Home Fleet that led to a general loss of initiative. Regenbogen was also hampered by the intention to send Lützow into the Atlantic following the action, which meant that the ship would have to avoid damage.

== Action ==
On 22 December 1942 Convoy JW 51B sailed for Murmansk and was detected by U-354 on 30 December. The German flotilla sailed from Altafjord the same day. In the Battle of the Barents Sea, Regenbogen had some success; Hipper was able to draw off the escort as planned, allowing Lützow to close with the convoy. Excessive caution by the captain of Lutzow caused him to break off the attack having caused little damage.

== Aftermath ==
The failure of the operation can be attributed to the spirited defence made by the convoy escort and the restrictive and contradictory orders given by Hitler to the force commander. Hitler was furious when he heard about the dismal result of the operation. He subjected Grand Admiral Erich Raeder, the head of the Kriegsmarine, to a 90-minute tirade, in which he berated the uselessness of the German surface fleet and announced a decision to scrap all its ships and use its guns and men in shore defences. Raeder felt unable to continue without the confidence of his leader and offered his resignation, which was accepted. Raeder was replaced by Admiral Karl Dönitz, the commander of the U-boat fleet.

== German order of battle ==
Regenbogen ships
Ship	Flag	Type	Notes
Admiral Hipper	Kriegsmarine	Admiral Hipper-class cruiser	Sailed 30 December
Lützow	Kriegsmarine	Deutschland-class cruiser	Sailed 30 December
Z4 Richard Beitzen	Kriegsmarine	Type 1934-class destroyer	Sailed 30 December
Z6 Theodor Riedel	Kriegsmarine	Type 1934A-class destroyer	Sailed 30 December
Z16 Friedrich Eckoldt	Kriegsmarine	Type 1934A-class destroyer	Sailed 30 December
Z29	Kriegsmarine	Type 1936A-class destroyer	Sailed 30 December
Z30	Kriegsmarine	Type 1936A-class destroyer	Sailed 30 December
Z31	Kriegsmarine	Type 1936A-class destroyer	Sailed 30 December
