= German destroyer Z30 =

Destroyer

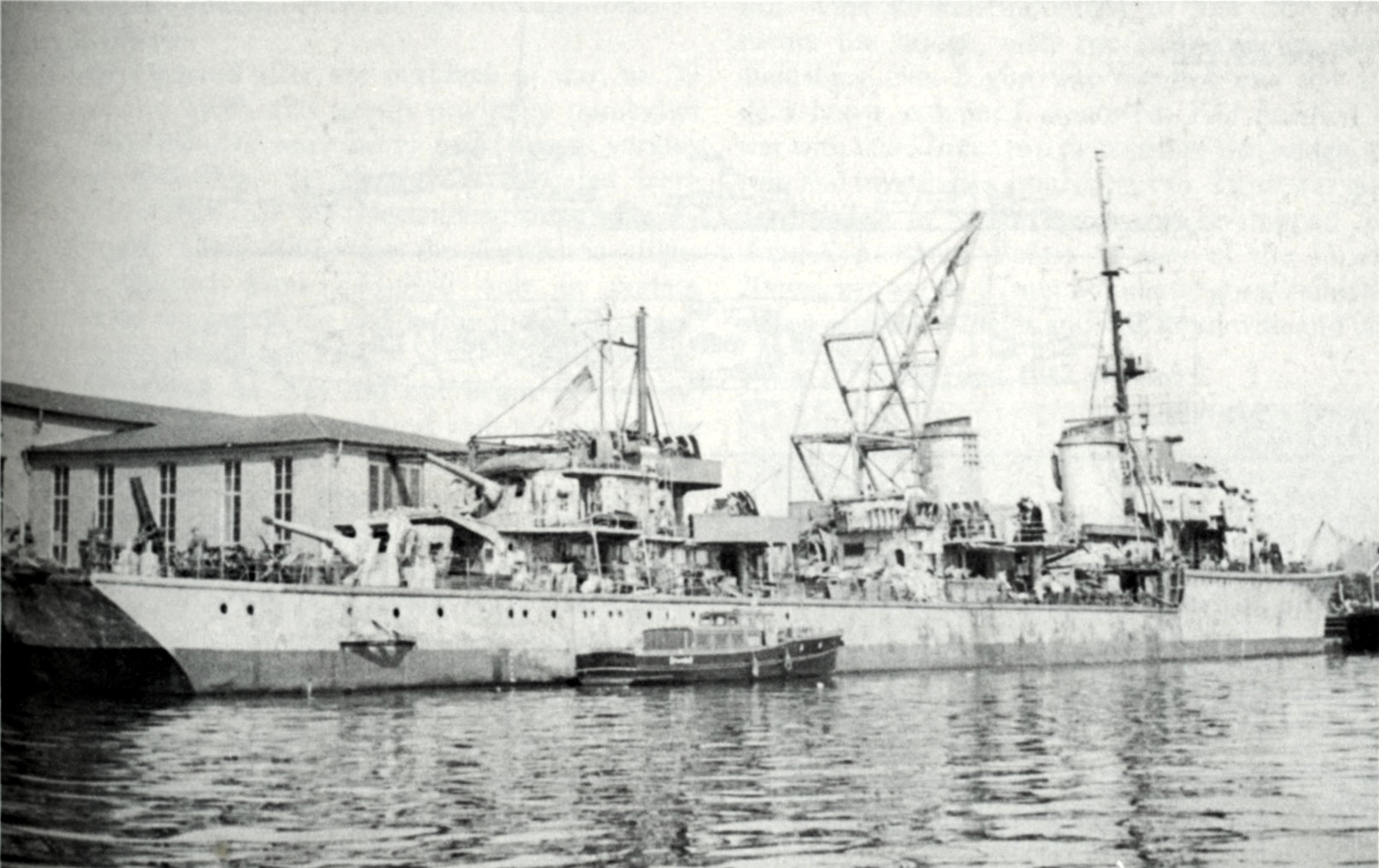
- Sister ship Z29, 1945

History

Nazi Germany
- Name: Z30
- Ordered: 23 April 1938
- Builder: AG Weser (Deschimag), Bremen
- Yard number: W964
- Laid down: 15 April 1940
- Launched: 8 December 1940
- Commissioned: 15 November 1941
- Decommissioned: 14 May 1945
- Captured: 6 May 1945
- Fate: Sold for scrap, 9 September 1948

General characteristics (as built)
- Class & type: Type 1936A destroyer
- Displacement: 2,657 long tons (2,700 t) (standard); 3,691 long tons (3,750 t) (deep load)
- Length: 127 m (416 ft 8 in) (o/a)
- Beam: 12 m (39 ft 4 in)
- Draft: 4.62 m (15 ft 2 in)
- Installed power: 6 × water-tube boilers; 70,000 PS (51,000 kW; 69,000 shp)
- Propulsion: 2 × shafts; 2 × geared steam turbine sets
- Speed: 36 knots (67 km/h; 41 mph)
- Range: 2,950 nmi (5,460 km; 3,390 mi) at 19 knots (35 km/h; 22 mph)
- Complement: 332
- Armament: 4 × single 15 cm (5.9 in) guns; 2 × twin 3.7 cm (1.5 in) AA guns; 5 × single 2 cm (0.8 in) AA guns; 2 × quadruple 53.3 cm (21 in) torpedo tubes; 4 × depth charge launchers; 60 mines

Z30 was one of fifteen Type 1936A destroyers built for the Kriegsmarine (German Navy) during World War II. Completed in 1941, the ship was transferred to Norwegian waters in early 1942 where she remained for most of the rest of her career, escorting convoys and laying minefields. She played a minor role in the indecisive Battle of the Barents Sea at the end of the year and was damaged during the raid on the island of Spitsbergen in September 1943.

Z30 was crippled when she struck a mine in late 1944 and spent the rest of the war under repair. The ship was allocated to Great Britain after the war who used her to test the effects of underwater explosions. Upon their completion in 1948, Z30 was broken up for scrap.

== Design and description ==
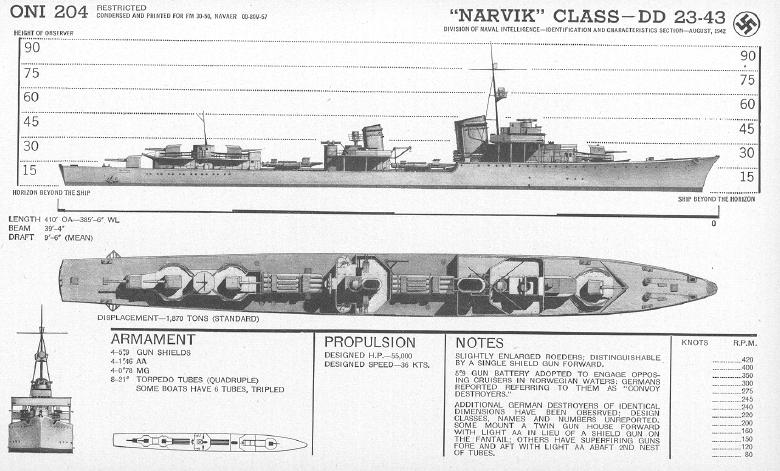
Wartime Allied recognition manual drawing of the Type 36A destroyer

The Type 1936A destroyers were slightly larger than the preceding Type 1936 class and had a heavier armament. They had an overall length of 127 meters (416 ft 8 in) and were 121.9 meters (399 ft 11 in) long at the waterline. The ships had a beam of 12 meters (39 ft 4 in), and a maximum draft of 4.62 meters (15 ft 2 in). They displaced 2,657 long tons (2,700 t) at standard load and 3,691 long tons (3,750 t) at deep load. The two Wagner geared steam turbine sets, each driving one propeller shaft, were designed to produce 70,000 PS (51,000 kW; 69,000 shp) using steam provided by six Wagner water-tube boilers for a designed speed of 36 knots (67 km/h; 41 mph). Z30 carried enough fuel oil to give her a range of 2,950 nautical miles (5,460 km; 3,390 mi) at 19 knots (35 km/h; 22 mph). Her crew consisted of 11 officers and 321 sailors.

The ship carried four 15-centimeter (5.9 in) TbtsK C/36 guns in single mounts with gun shields, one forward of the superstructure and three aft. Her anti-aircraft armament consisted of four 3.7-centimeter (1.5 in) C/30 guns in two twin mounts abreast the rear funnel and five 2-centimeter (0.8 in) C/30 guns in single mounts. Z30 carried eight above-water 53.3-centimeter (21 in) torpedo tubes in two power-operated mounts. Two reloads were provided for each mount. She had four depth charge launchers and mine rails could be fitted on the rear deck that had a maximum capacity of 60 mines. 'GHG' (Gruppenhorchgerät) passive hydrophones were fitted to detect submarines and an S-Gerät sonar was also probably fitted. The ship was equipped with a FuMO 24/25 radar set above the bridge.

=== Modifications ===
During 1942–1943, Z30's anti-aircraft armament was increased to ten each 3.7 cm and 2 cm guns. A FuMO 63 Hohentwiel radar was installed in 1944–1945 in lieu of the aft searchlight. By the end of the war, her anti-aircraft suite consisted of seven 3.7 cm and fourteen 2 cm weapons.

== Service history ==
Z30 was ordered from AG Weser (Deschimag) on 23 April 1938. The ship was laid down at Deschimag's Bremen shipyard as yard number W964 on 14 January 1940, launched on 12 August, and commissioned on 15 November 1941. While working up she accidentally collided with the German submarine U-216 on 14 January 1942.

Beginning on 18 March, she escorted the heavy cruiser Admiral Hipper from Brunsbüttel, Germany, to Trondheim, Norway, and then accompanied the heavy cruiser Admiral Scheer from Trondheim to Narvik. Z30 took part in the preliminaries of Operation Rösselsprung, an attempt to intercept Convoy PQ 17 in July. Admiral Scheer and her sister Lützow formed one group in Narvik with Z30 and four of her sisters while the battleship Tirpitz and Admiral Hipper composed another. While en route to the rendezvous at the Altafjord, Lützow and three destroyers of Tirpitz's escort ran aground, forcing the entire group to abandon the operation. On 5–8 September Z30, her sister Z29, and the destroyer Z4 Richard Beitzen laid a minefield in the Kara Strait between the island of Novaya Zemlya and Vaygach Island. Later that month, she participated in Operation Zarin, a minelaying mission off the coast of Novaya Zemlya from 24 to 28 September, together with Admiral Hipper, and her sisters Z23, Z28, and Z29. On 13–15 October, Z30, her sister Z27, Z4 Richard Beitzen and the destroyer Z16 Friedrich Eckoldt laid a minefield off the Kanin Peninsula at the mouth of the White Sea that damaged the Soviet icebreaker Mikoyan. Three weeks later, the same four destroyers escorted Admiral Hipper as she attempted to intercept Allied merchant ships proceeding independently to Soviet ports in early November. They intercepted and sank the westbound Soviet oil tanker Donbass and the submarine chaser BO-78 on the 7th.

On 30 December, Lützow and Admiral Hipper, escorted by six destroyers, including Z30, left Narvik for Operation Regenbogen, an attack on Convoy JW 51B, which was reported by German intelligence to be lightly escorted. Vizeadmiral (Vice Admiral) Oskar Kummetz's plan was to divide his force in half; he would take Admiral Hipper and three destroyers north of the convoy to attack it and draw away the escorts. Lützow, Z30 and the destroyers Z6 Theodor Riedel and Z31 would then attack the undefended convoy from the south. The Germans failed to press home their attack, only briefly engaging the convoy and damaging one merchantman. Z30 was one of the escorts for the light cruiser Köln and the damaged Admiral Hipper on 24 January 1943 as they began their voyage to Kiel, Germany, where the destroyer began a refit.

She returned to Norwegian waters after her refit and conducted several minelaying missions between 19 and 28 June together with Z27. The ship took part in Operation Zitronella, the German raid on the island of Spitsbergen in September where she was hit by coastal artillery and slightly damaged. Z30 was one of the escorts for the battleship Scharnhorst during Operation Ostfront on 25 December, an attempt to intercept the British Convoy JW 55B that was bound for the Soviet Union. All of the battleship's escorts were detached the following day to increase the likelihood of intercepting the convoy and did not participate in the ensuing Battle of North Cape. The ship was transferred to southern Norway in 1944 and escorted convoys and laid minefields from 8 May. She began a refit at Swinemünde, Germany, on 31 August and conducted operations in the western Baltic and Skaggerak when it was completed. While escorting a convoy on 20 October, Z30 struck a mine off Oslofjord that crippled her. The explosion destroyed her stern compartment, knocked out the port turbine, jammed the starboard propeller shaft and caused extensive shock damage throughout the ship. Towed to Oslo, Norway, for repairs, they were not yet complete when Germany surrendered on 8 May 1945 and she was decommissioned six days later.

Z30 was turned over to the Royal Norwegian Navy for maintenance purposes on 15 July while the Allies decided how to divide the surviving ships of the Kriegsmarine amongst themselves as war reparations. The ship was allotted to the British in late 1945 and was towed to Rosyth, Scotland, on 6 February 1946. She was effectively unusable without extensive – and expensive – repairs so she was condemned to be used for evaluating the effects of underwater explosions on her hull. Z30 was towed to Loch Striven where the tests were conducted between May and September 1948. Three 500-kilogram (1,100 lb) charges of torpex were detonated below her hull at various depths. Despite some damage to her hull plating, her welded hull was not significantly damaged during the tests. The ship was sold for scrap on 9 September and towed to their facility at Dalmuir to be demolished.
