= HMS Unshaken =

Submarine of the Royal Navy

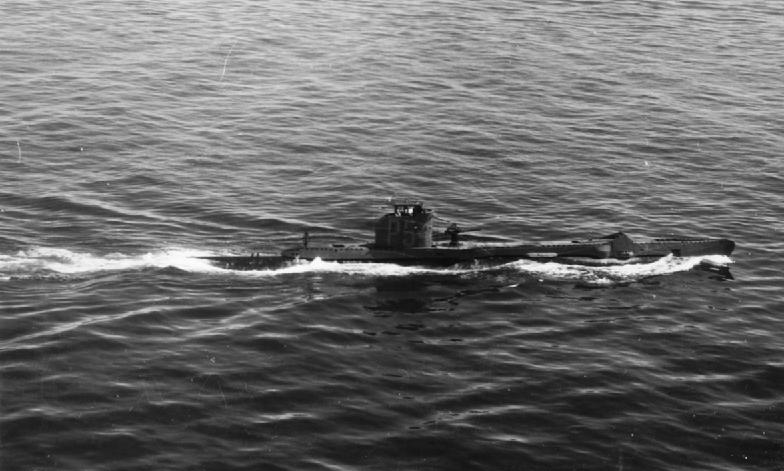
- An aerial view of HMS Unshaken underway in May 1942

History

United Kingdom
- Name: HMS Unshaken
- Builder: Vickers-Armstrongs, Barrow-in-Furness
- Laid down: 12 June 1941
- Launched: 17 February 1942
- Commissioned: 21 May 1942
- Fate: Scrapped March 1946
- Badge

General characteristics
- Class & type: U-class submarine
- Displacement: Surfaced - 540 tons standard, 630 tons full load; Submerged - 730 tons
- Length: 58.22 m (191 ft)
- Beam: 4.90 m (16 ft 1 in)
- Draught: 4.62 m (15 ft 2 in)
- Propulsion: 2 shaft diesel-electric; 2 Paxman Ricardo diesel generators + electric motors; 615 / 825 hp
- Speed: 11.25 knots maximum surfaced; 10 knots (19 km/h) maximum submerged
- Complement: 27–31
- Armament: Four bow internal 21 inch (533 mm) torpedo tubes - 8 - 10 torpedoes; one - 3-inch (76 mm) gun

HMS Unshaken (P54) was a Royal Navy U-class submarine built by Vickers-Armstrongs at Barrow-in-Furness. She has been the only vessel of the Royal Navy to bear the name Unshaken.

== Career ==
After a period operating off the coast of Norway, Unshaken spent most of her wartime career in the Mediterranean. While in northern waters, on 5 July 1942, Unshaken radioed in a sighting and an exact description of a heavy German force – including the Tirpitz, Admiral Scheer, and Admiral Hipper – at sea in pursuit of Convoy PQ 17 off northern Norway. Hearing of these allied sighting reports (also made by the Russian submarine K-21 and a Catalina patrol aircraft) through intelligence, Admiral Raeder cancelled the sortie, ordering the surface fleet to return to port and left the Luftwaffe and U-boats to attack the convoy. The convoy lost 24 ships out of 40, but it could have been even worse for the convoy if the heavy force had remained at sea.

On 12 August 1942, Unshaken sank the German cargo ship Georg L.-M. Russ off southern Norway. Later that year she was reassigned to the Mediterranean, where she sank the Italian cargo ships Foggia and Pomo (the former Yugoslavian Nico Matkovic), the Italian torpedo boat Climene, the Italian sailing vessel Giovanni G., the Italian auxiliary patrol vessel No 265 / Cesena, and the Italian troop transport Asmara. She also damaged the Italian tanker Dora C. She made unsuccessful attacks on the French cargo ship Oasis, Italian cargo ships Pomo, Nina and Campania, and French passenger/cargo ship Cap Corse. Unshaken had a narrow escape after the Polish submarine ORP Dzik fired four torpedoes at her. The Poles thought they were attacking an enemy submarine, but the torpedoes missed their target.

On the night that Italy ceased hostilities, Unshaken captured the Italian submarine Ciro Menotti and escorted her to Malta. Lieutenant Commander Jack Whitton, Unshaken's commander, ordered the boat to surface after her hydrophone operator reported 'high speed revs'. He then decided to board the Italian vessel as her bridge was crowded with people and could not dive quickly. A shot from the deck gun across the bows of the Italian submarine was followed by a return burst from an automatic weapon which was suppressed by machine gun fire from the British vessel. Unshaken then came alongside Menotti, and able seaman Ronald "Sharky" Ward boarded the Italian vessel and secured the conning tower hatch to prevent her from diving. He was armed with a pistol, but unknown to Sharky it was unloaded, an envelope provided to the seaman when receiving his orders and the pistol contained the bullets. There followed a robust verbal exchange in which the Italian commander wanted to go to Brindisi, whereas Whitton insisted on Malta. The situation looked as if it might turn ugly, until the loaded deck gun was pointed at the Italian commander from a distance of about 13 feet (4 m).

After returning to home waters in mid-1944, Unshaken sank the German cargo ship Asien off Lista in Norway.

Unshaken survived the war, and was scrapped at Troon in March 1946.
