= Operation Zarin =

1942 Mining operation in Arctic waters

Unternehmen Zarin (Operation Tsarina)
- Part of Arctic naval operations of the Second World War
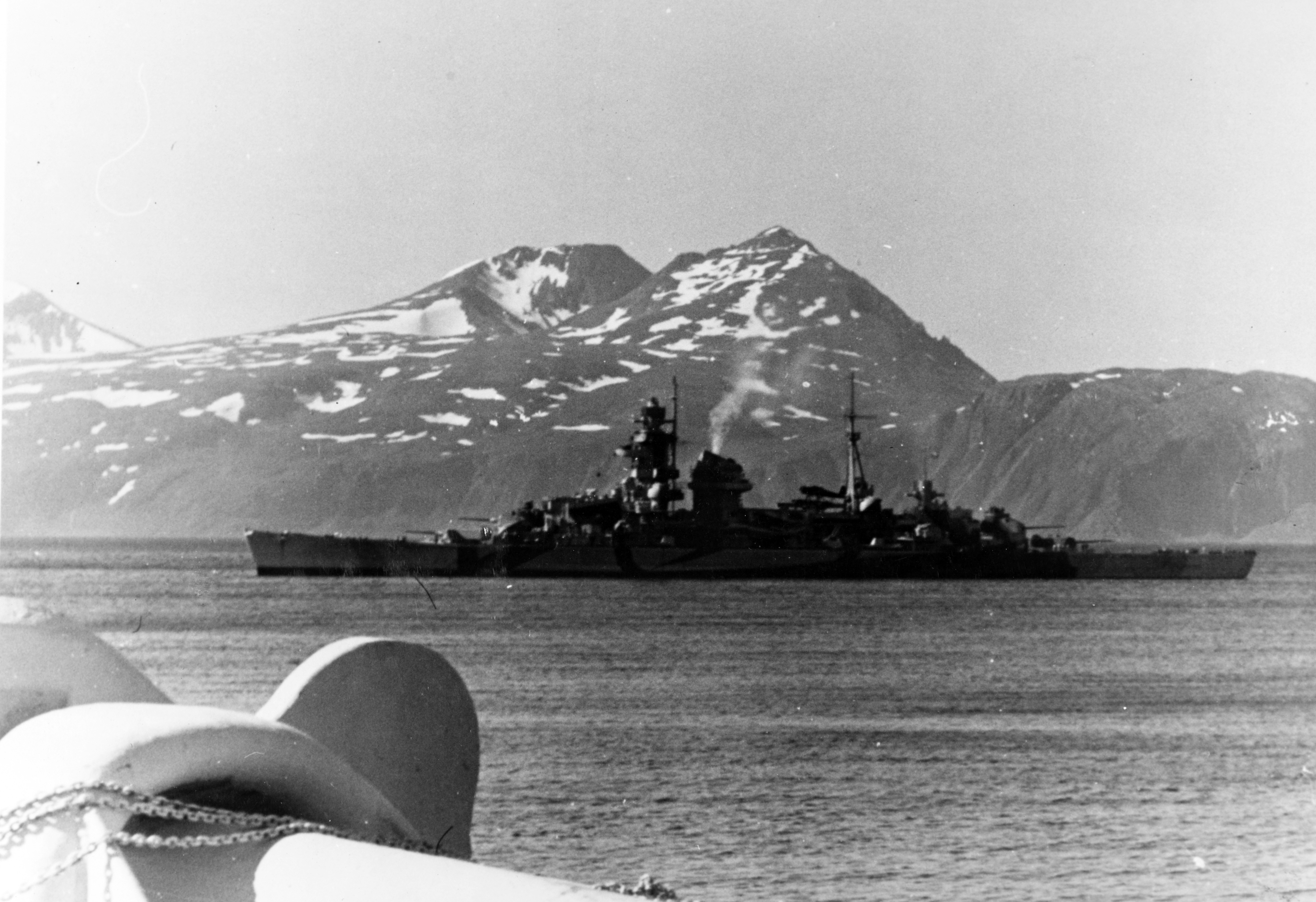
- Admiral Hipper, Norway, 1942
Date	24–28 September 1942
Location	Arctic Ocean 68°58′N 33°05′E
Result	Indecisive

Strength
- 1 Heavy cruiser 4 Destroyers

Operation Zarin (English: Tsarina [Unternehmen Zarin]) was a German minelaying operation off the north-western coast of the islands of Novaya Zemlya in the Arctic Ocean. The operation was conducted between 24 September and 28 September 1942 by the German heavy cruiser Admiral Hipper escorted by the destroyers Z23, Z28, Z29 and Z30, because the British had sunk the specialist minelayer Ulm on 25 August. The mines laid during the operation had little effect.

== Background ==
=== Operation Tsar (Unternehmen Zar) ===
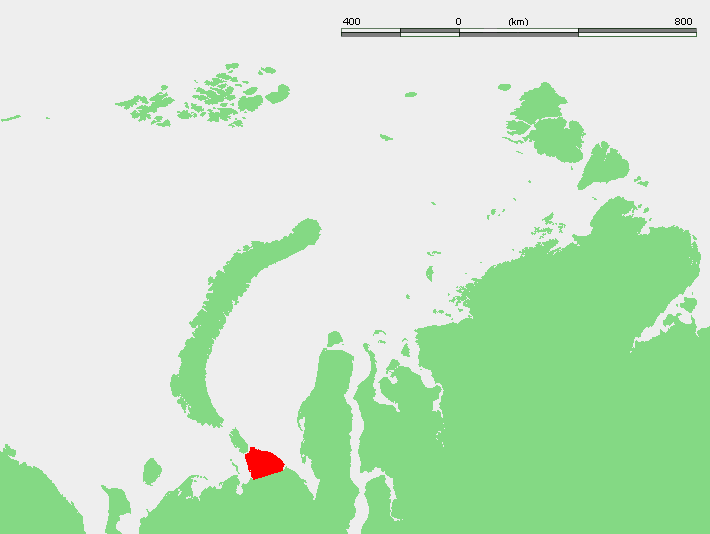
Location of the Yugorsky Peninsula in red, the strait is to the north-west

During Convoy PQ 17 (27 June – 10 July 1942) freighters sailed as far north as possible and used the coasts of Novaya Zemlya as cover to get to Murmansk or Arkhangelsk. In Operation Tsar (Unternehmen Zar) the minelayer Ulm was sent from Kiel to Narvik escorted by the destroyer Z23 and the torpedo boats T9 and T12 from 15 to 19 August. Ulm was to lay a minefield off Cape Zhelaniya, the most northerly point of Novaya Zemlya, after the completion of Operation Wonderland (Unternehmen Wunderland 16 August – 5 October 1942). The minefield would force Allied ships to steer more to the south and bring them into the range of the German bomber aircraft stationed in Norway. The sortie by Ulm was uncovered by the British Enigma machine code-breakers of the Government Code and Cypher School on 25 August. Mines were to be laid by U-boats as part of Unternehmen Zar off the narrow Matochkin Strait between Severny Island and Yuzhny Island of Novaya Zemlya in Operation Peter (Unternehmen Peter) by U-589. In Operation Paul (Unternehmen Paul) U-591 was to mine the Yugorsky Strait, the sound between the Kara Sea and the Pechora Sea.

==== Sinking of Ulm ====
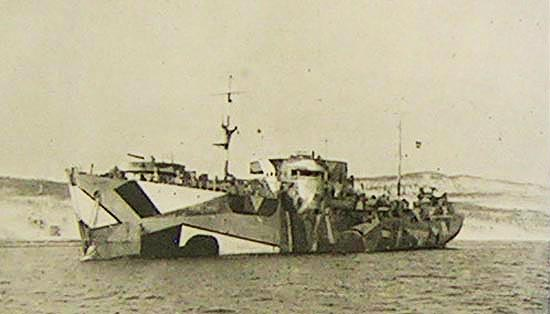
The Minelayer Ulm at anchor

The US heavy cruiser USS Tuscaloosa, with two US and three British destroyer escorts, had delivered the ground crews and equipment for Operation Orator, then sailed from the Soviet Union on 24 August and after picking up survivors from Convoy PQ 17 were in the Barents Sea. The Admiralty ordered the commander of HMS Onslaught to detach from Tuscaloosa with Marne and Martin and steer south-east of Bear Island, later altered to south towards the North Cape. Selby was told that light warships were thought to be in the area. (Note: The decision to send orders to ship commanders ignorant of Enigma decodes was unusual.) At 9:55 p.m. a ship was sighted and the destroyers accelerated to 25 kn (46 km/h; 29 mph), the ship turned to port until sailing away from the destroyers; six minutes afterwards, Onslaught began to fire at 9,000 yd (5.1 mi; 8.2 km), Marne following suit. Ulm turned west, then to the south-west, beginning to zigzag.

Kapitänleutnant der Reserve Ernst Biet, the German captain, ordered fire to be opened with the 105 mm gun. Marne and Martin straddled Ulm with shells and Ulm hit Marne on Y gun, killing a member of the crew and three of the survivors from PQ 17, wounding five more. By 10:16 p.m. the range had reduced to 2,500 yd (2,300 m) and the anti-aircraft guns of the destroyers were used to fire at the bridge of the German ship, to hit the wireless room and any fire-control apparatus. The automatic fire caused many casualties as much of the crew had gathered there, ready to abandon ship. Onslaught was endangered by the fall of shot from Marne and increased speed to 30 kn (35 mph; 56 km/h) to get out of the way. Onslaught missed with two torpedoes but hit Ulm near the foremast at 10:31 p.m. setting off a big explosion and detonating ammunition, breaking Ulm in two, the halves sinking quickly at 10:35 p.m. Marne rescued 54 survivors but abandoned 30 to 40 men to die, apparently due to the presence of German aircraft; 132 men were killed. The loss of Ulm greatly diminished the German ability to lay large quantities of mines in the Arctic.

== Operation Tsarina (Unternehmen Zarin) ==
The Matochkin Strait, between Severny Island and Yuzhny Island

The sinking of Ulm forced the Germans to improvise by using the heavy cruiser Admiral Hipper as a substitute, to lay the minefield off the islands of Novaya Zemlya in Unternehmen Zarin (Operation Tsarina). The operation was commanded by Vice Admiral Oskar Kummetz and due to commence on 23 September. Admiral Hipper (Konteradmiral [Rear-Admiral] Wilhelm Meisel), with 96 naval mines on deck, was to sail from Altafjord escorted by the destroyers Z23, Z28, Z29 and Z30.

== Sortie ==
On 24 September, Admiral Hipper sailed with its four destroyer escorts, present until the morning of 26 September. In the evening the minefield was laid on the north-west coast of Novaya Zemlya. Admiral Hipper picked up radio traffic from ships nearby and Meisel wanted to investigate but Kummetz was more prudent and returned to the destroyers. The flotilla arrived back at Kaafjord on 28 September.

== Aftermath ==
A Swedish source, known as agent A 2, who worked for the British Naval Attaché in Stockholm and Enigma decrypts from Bletchley Park, warned the Admiralty that another operation against an Arctic convoy by U-boats, ships and aircraft was being prepared. On 5 August, due to a false alarm from a U-boat, the cruiser Köln had been sent north from Trondheim to join Tirpitz, Admiral Scheer, and Admiral Hipper around Narvik. The Luftwaffe in Northern Norway had been reinforced by about thirty Junkers Ju 88 torpedo-bombers. The threat of another operation against an Allied convoy had been considered serious by the British until the end of September. Enigma decrypts had not given the British warning of the sortie by Hipper and a report from agent A 2 that Admiral Hipper had sailed on 24 September was not received by the Admiralty until 27 September. No ships are known to have run into the minefield. (Note: Operation Peter took place on 28 August and Paul was called off. The Russian patrol ship SKR-23/Musson was sunk on 11 October and the merchant ship Shchors (3,770 gross register tons) was mined and sunk of the Yugorsky Strait on 14 October.)

== German order of battle ==
German flotilla
Name	Flag	Type	Notes
Admiral Hipper	Kriegsmarine	Admiral Hipper-class cruiser	24–28 September, flag, Konteradmiral [Rear-Admiral] Wilhelm Meisel
Z23	Kriegsmarine	Type 1936A-class destroyer	24–26 September
Z28	Kriegsmarine	Type 1936A-class destroyer	24–26 September
Z29	Kriegsmarine	Type 1936A-class destroyer	24–26 September
Z30	Kriegsmarine	Type 1936A-class destroyer	24–26 September
