= German destroyer Z28 =

Warship

Coordinates: 54°30′N 19°40′E

- Z28, September 1941

History

Nazi Germany
- Name: Z28
- Ordered: 23 April 1938
- Builder: AG Weser (Deschimag), Bremen
- Yard number: W962
- Laid down: 30 November 1939
- Launched: 20 August 1940
- Completed: 9 August 1941
- Fate: Sunk by air attack, 6 March 1945

General characteristics (as built)
- Class & type: Type 1936A destroyer
- Displacement: 2,596 long tons (2,638 t) (standard); 3,605 long tons (3,663 t) (deep load)
- Length: 127 m (416 ft 8 in) (o/a)
- Beam: 12 m (39 ft 4 in)
- Draft: 4.65 m (15 ft 3 in)
- Installed power: 6 × water-tube boilers; 70,000 PS (51,000 kW; 69,000 shp)
- Propulsion: 2 × shafts; 2 × geared steam turbine sets
- Speed: 36 knots (67 km/h; 41 mph)
- Range: 2,500 nmi (4,600 km; 2,900 mi) at 19 knots (35 km/h; 22 mph)
- Complement: 332
- Armament: 4 × single 15 cm (5.9 in) guns; 2 × twin 3.7 cm (1.5 in) anti-aircraft guns; 6 × single 2 cm (0.8 in) AA guns; 2 × quadruple 53.3 cm (21 in) torpedo tubes; 60 mines

Service record
- Commanders: Hans Erdmenger; Hansjürgen Reinicke; Karl-Adolf Zenker

Z28 was one of fifteen Type 1936A destroyers built for the Kriegsmarine (Germany Navy) during World War II. Built as a flotilla leader with fewer guns than her sister ships, she was completed in 1941. The ship spent most of the first few years of her service in Norwegian waters, escorting convoys and laying minefields. Z28 ran aground in early 1943 and spent the rest of the year under repair. The ship briefly returned to Norway at the beginning of 1944, but was transferred to the Baltic shortly afterwards to support minelaying operations in the Gulf of Finland. That was her primary focus through July and then she began escorting German cruisers as they bombarded Soviet troops ashore in addition to German convoys evacuating people from Finland and the Baltic States.

Z28 also bombarded Soviet positions herself on multiple occasions until she was damaged by bombs during one such mission in October. Her repairs took until February 1945 and, not long afterwards, she was sunk in port by British bombers on 6 March with heavy loss of life.

== Design and description ==
Z28 had an overall length of 127 meters (416 ft 8 in) and was 121.90 meters (399 ft 11 in) long at the waterline. The ship had a beam of 12 meters (39 ft 4 in), and a maximum draft of 4.38 meters (14 ft 4 in). She displaced 2,596 long tons (2,638 t) at standard load and 3,519 long tons (3,575 t) at deep load. The two Wagner geared steam turbine sets, each driving one propeller shaft, were designed to produce 70,000 PS (51,000 kW; 69,000 shp) using steam provided by six Wagner water-tube boilers for a designed speed of 36 knots (67 km/h; 41 mph). Z28 carried a maximum of 804 metric tons (791 long tons) of fuel oil which gave a range of 2,900 nautical miles (5,400 km; 3,300 mi) at 19 knots (35 km/h; 22 mph). Her crew consisted of 11 officers and 321 sailors.

Z28 carried four 15 cm TbtsK C/36 guns in single mounts with gun shields, two guns each superimposed fore and aft of the superstructure. To accommodate the flotilla commander and his staff, one gun was repositioned from atop the aft superstructure to the upper forward position and the aft superstructure enlarged. Her anti-aircraft armament consisted of four 3.7 cm SK C/30 guns in two twin mounts abreast the rear funnel and six 2 cm C/30 guns in single mounts. The Type 36A ships carried eight above-water 53.3-centimeter (21.0 in) torpedo tubes in two power-operated mounts. A pair of reload torpedoes was provided for each mount. They had four depth charge launchers and mine rails could be fitted on the rear deck that had a maximum capacity of 60 mines. A system of passive hydrophones designated as 'GHG' (Gruppenhorchgerät) was fitted to detect submarines. A S-Gerät sonar was also probably fitted. The ship was equipped with a FuMO 24/25 radar set above the bridge.

=== Modifications ===
During 1942–1943, Z28's anti-aircraft armament was increased to ten each 3.7 cm and 2 cm guns. A FuMO 63 Hohentwiel radar was installed in 1944–1945 in lieu of the aft searchlight.

== Service history ==
Z28 was ordered from AG Weser (Deschimag) on 23 April 1938. The ship was laid down at Deschimag's Bremen shipyard as yard number W962 on 30 November 1939, launched on 20 August 1940, and commissioned on 9 August 1941. Her first commander was Korvettenkapitän (Lieutenant Commander) Hans Erdmenger. While working up from late 1941 to early 1942, she was based in Aarhus, Denmark, and patrolled the Skagerrak and Kattegat.

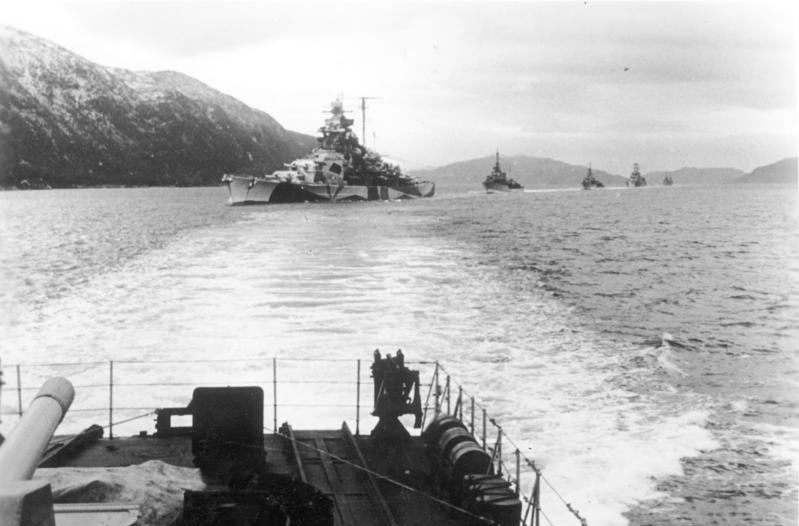
The battleship Tirpitz and her escorts, including Z28, en route to Trondheim, Norway, October 1942

The ship was transferred to Norway in April where she escorted convoys; with her sister Z30 and a pair of torpedo boats, she escorted the heavy cruiser Admiral Scheer and the replenishment oiler Dithmarschen to Narvik on 9 May. Z28 took part in the preliminaries of Operation Rösselsprung, an attempt to intercept Convoy PQ 17 in July. Admiral Scheer and her sister Lützow formed one group in Narvik with Z28 and four of her sisters while the battleship Tirpitz and Admiral Hipper composed another. While en route to the rendezvous at the Altafjord, Lützow and three destroyers of Tirpitz's escort ran aground, forcing the entire group to abandon the operation. She participated in Operation Zarin, a minelaying mission off the coast of the island of Novaya Zemlya from 24 to 28 September, together with Admiral Hipper, and her sisters Z23, Z29, and Z30. On 1 October, Z28 escorted Admiral Hipper from Altafjord to Bogen Bay and then Tirpitz and Admiral Scheer to Trondheim on the 24th. She continued on to Kiel, Germany, to begin a refit.

In early March 1943, she was one of the escorts of the battleship Scharnhorst on her voyage to Bogen Bay, the only one not to sustain weather damage. While sailing from Altafjord to Harstad with the destroyer Z4 Richard Beitzen on 2 April, Z28 ran aground. She sailed to Trondheim for repairs and was slightly damaged during an air raid on the docks there on 24 July. The ship then returned to Deschimag's dockyard in Bremen for complete repairs. She was based in Kristiansand, Norway, for anti-contraband patrols from 7 January 1944 and was now assigned to the 6. Zerstörerflotille (6th Destroyer Flotilla). On 12–13 February, Z28 and two other destroyers from the flotilla laid a minefield in the Skagerrak. Shortly afterwards, the 6th Flotilla was transferred to the Gulf of Finland to support minelaying operations there, Z28 arriving at Reval, Estonia, on 21 February. The flotilla was initially tasked to escort convoys between Libau, Latvia, and Reval, but laid its first minefield in Narva Bay on 12 March while bombarding Soviet positions on the eastern shore of the bay. They were primarily tasked as minelayers through July. In preparation for Operation Tanne West, the occupation of Åland in case of Finnish surrender, the flotilla escorted Lützow to the island of Utö on 28 June, but the operation was canceled and the ships returned to port.

On 30 July and 1 August Z28 and three other destroyers of the flotilla sailed into the Gulf of Riga to bombard Soviet positions inland. On 5 August, they escorted the heavy cruiser Prinz Eugen as she engaged targets on the island of Oesel, Estonia, and in Latvia on 19–20 August. Z28 and the destroyer Z36 escorted the troopship MV Monte Rosa, laden with refugees, from Baltischport, Estonia, to Gotenhafen, Germany, on 16 September. Four days later, the ship helped to evacuate 23,172 people from Reval in the face of the advancing Soviets. The following day, the ship, together with the destroyer Z25, ferried 370 people from Baltischport to Libau. On 22 August, she escorted ships loaded with evacuees from the Sea of Åland to Gotenhafen. Z28 resumed her shore bombardment missions on 10 October, attacking targets at Memel on that date and the 23rd. She engaged Soviet positions in Sworbe, on the Estonian island of Saaremaa, on the 22nd and 24th. During the latter mission, she was damaged by Soviet aircraft, killing nine crewmen and wounding many others, and sailed for Swinemünde for repairs. They were completed on 25 February 1945 and Z28 escorted the ocean liner Deutschland from Gotenhafen to Sassnitz two days later as it evacuated Germans from the Polish Corridor as part of Operation Hannibal. After repeating the mission on 4 March, the ship was sunk with heavy casualties in the latter port two days later by the Royal Air Force after being hit by two bombs amidships.
