= German torpedo boat T23 =

German destroyer

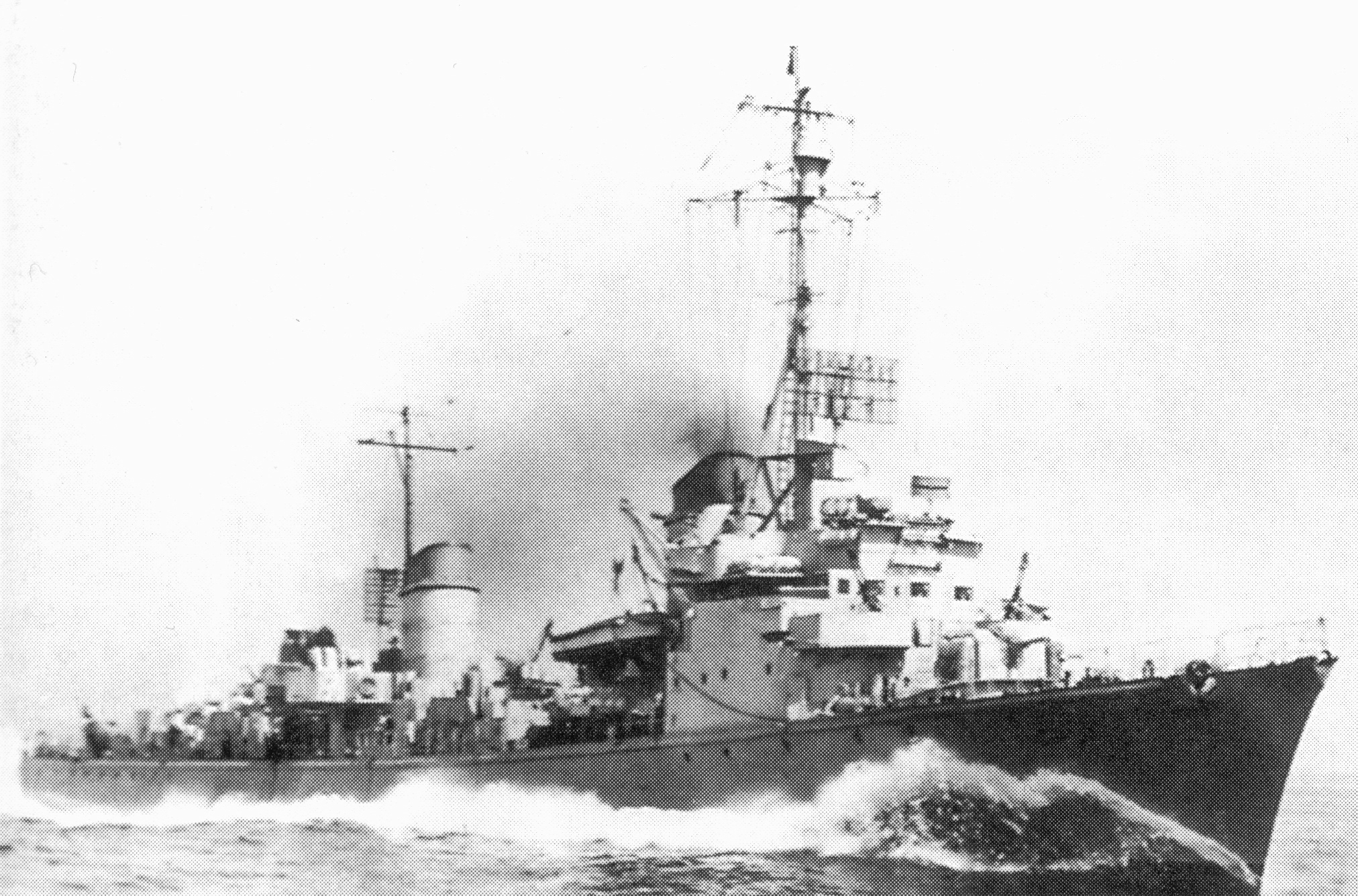
- Sister ship T35 in US service, August 1945

History

Nazi Germany
- Name: T23
- Ordered: 10 November 1939
- Builder: Schichau, Elbing, East Prussia
- Yard number: 1482
- Laid down: 1 August 1940
- Launched: 14 June 1941
- Completed: 14 June 1942
- Fate: Transferred to Britain as war reparations, 1945; then to France, 4 February 1946

France
- Name: L'Alsacien
- Namesake: The Alsatian
- Acquired: 4 February 1946
- Recommissioned: December 1949
- Out of service: 9 June 1954
- Renamed: 4 February 1946
- Stricken: 17 February 1954
- Fate: Sold for scrap, after 9 June 1954

General characteristics (as built)
- Class & type: Type 39 torpedo boat
- Displacement: 1,294 t (1,274 long tons) (standard); 1,754 t (1,726 long tons) (deep load)
- Length: 102.5 m (336 ft 3 in) o/a
- Beam: 10 m (32 ft 10 in)
- Draft: 3.22 m (10 ft 7 in)
- Installed power: 4 × water-tube boilers; 32,000 shp (24,000 kW)
- Propulsion: 2 × shafts; 2 × geared steam turbine sets
- Speed: 33.5 knots (62.0 km/h; 38.6 mph)
- Range: 2,400 nmi (4,400 km; 2,800 mi) at 19 knots (35 km/h; 22 mph)
- Complement: 206
- Sensors & processing systems: S-Gerät sonar; FuMO 21 radar
- Armament: 4 × single 10.5 cm (4.1 in) guns; 2 × twin 3.7 cm (1.5 in) AA guns; 1 × quadruple, 2 × single 2 cm (0.8 in) AA guns; 2 × triple 533 mm (21 in) torpedo tubes; 30–60 mines; 4 × depth charge launchers

The German torpedo boat T23 was one of fifteen Type 39 torpedo boats built for the Kriegsmarine (German Navy) during World War II. Completed in mid-1942, the boat was stationed in France later that year where she escorted blockade runners and U-boats through the Bay of Biscay. T23 also laid minefields in the English Channel in mid-1943. She participated in the Battle of Sept-Îles and the Battle of the Bay of Biscay later that year, neither receiving nor inflicting any damage.

After returning to Germany in early 1944, the boat was assigned to support German operations in the Baltic Sea. She escorted convoys and larger warships bombarding Soviet troops as well as bombarding them herself. In May T23 helped to evacuate troops and refugees from advancing Soviet forces. The boat was allocated to Great Britain after the war, but she was transferred to France in 1946. The French Navy renamed her L'Alsacien and recommissioned her in 1949. After serving with different units of the Mediterranean Squadron, she was condemned in 1954 and subsequently sold for scrap.

== Design and description ==
The Type 39 torpedo boat was conceived as a general-purpose design, much larger than preceding German torpedo boats. The boats had an overall length of 102.5 meters (336 ft 3 in) and were 97 meters (318 ft 3 in) long at the waterline. They had a beam of 10 meters (32 ft 10 in), a draft of 3.22 meters (10 ft 7 in) at deep load and displaced 1,294 metric tons (1,274 long tons) at standard load and 1,754 metric tons (1,726 long tons) at deep load. Their crew numbered 206 officers and sailors. The Type 39s were fitted with a pair of geared steam turbine sets, each driving one propeller, using steam from four high-pressure water-tube boilers. The turbines were designed to produce 32,000 shaft horsepower (24,000 kW) which was intended give the ships a maximum speed of 33.5 knots (62.0 km/h; 38.6 mph). They carried enough fuel oil to give them a range of 2,400 nautical miles (4,400 km; 2,800 mi) at 19 knots (35 km/h; 22 mph).

As built, the Type 39 ships mounted four 10.5 cm (4.1 in) SK C/32 guns in single mounts protected by gun shields; one forward of the superstructure, one between the funnels, and two aft, one superfiring over the other. Anti-aircraft defense was provided by four 3.7 cm (1.5 in) SK C/30 AA guns in two twin-gun mounts on platforms abaft the rear funnel, six 2 cm (0.8 in) C/38 guns in one quadruple mount on the aft superstructure and a pair of single mounts on the bridge wings. They carried six above-water 533 mm (21.0 in) torpedo tubes in two triple mounts amidships and could also carry 30 mines; the full complement of 60 mines made the ships top-heavy which could be dangerous in bad weather. For anti-submarine work the boats were fitted with a S-Gerät sonar and four depth charge launchers. The Type 39s were equipped with a FuMO 21 (Note: Funkmess-Ortung (Radio-direction finder, active ranging)) radar. In January–February 1944 the single 2 cm mounts in the bridge wings were replaced by quadruple mounts and FuMB7 (Note: Funkmess-Beobachtung (passive radar detector).) "Naxos" and FuMB8 "Wanz G" radar detectors were installed. By early 1945, the quadruple 2 cm mounts on the bridge wings and the twin 3.7 cm mounts may have been replaced by single mounts for 3.7 cm guns, either the Flak M42 or the Flak M43, or 4 cm (1.6 in) Bofors guns.

== Construction and career ==
Originally ordered as a Type 37 torpedo boat on 30 March 1939, T23 was reordered on 10 November 1939 from Schichau. She was laid down on 1 August 1940 at their Elbing, East Prussia, shipyard as yard number 1482, launched on 14 June 1941 and commissioned on 14 June 1942. After working up, the boat was transferred to France in November. T23, her sister T22, and the torpedo boats Falke and Kondor escorted the Italian blockade runner SS Cortellazzo from Bordeaux through the Bay of Biscay on 29–30 November. Another Italian blockade runner, Himalaya, failed in her attempt to break through the Bay of Biscay on 30 March 1943 when she turned back after being spotted by British reconnaissance aircraft, despite a heavy escort of T23, Falke, and the torpedo boats T2, T12, and T18. Himalaya made another attempt on 9–11 April, escorted by T23, T2, T22, Kondor and the torpedo boat T5, but was forced to return by heavy aerial attacks. On 5–8 May, the 2nd Torpedo Boat Flotilla with T23, T2, T5, T18 and T22 laid three minefields in the Channel.

Now assigned to the 4th Torpedo Boat Flotilla, T23 returned to the Bay of Biscay to help escort U-boats through the Bay in July. While providing distant cover for a small convoy during the night of 3/4 October, the 4th Flotilla spotted a force of five British destroyers off the Sept-Îles near the coast of Brittany in the Channel and attacked with complete surprise. The first volley of five torpedoes all missed, but the British did not see them and continued on their course. Only when T23 turned on her radar to determine the range for a second volley did they react when one of the British destroyers detected the radar; they altered course just in time for the second volley of torpedoes to miss. Two of the British ships were able to pursue the retreating Germans at high speed, but both were damaged by German gunfire and forced to disengage.

=== Battle of Sept-Îles ===
On 22 October, the 4th Flotilla, now consisting of T23, T24, and their sisters T25, T26 and T27, sortied from Brest to provide cover for the unladen blockade runner Münsterland and her close escort from the 2nd Minesweeping Flotilla as they sailed up the Channel. The British were aware of Münsterland and attempted to intercept her on the night of the 23rd with a scratch force that consisted of the light cruiser Charybdis and the destroyers Grenville, Rocket, Limbourne, Wensleydale, Talybont and Stevenstone. T22's hydrophones detected the British ships off the Sept-Îles at 00:25 and Korvettenkapitän Franz Kohlauf maneuvered his flotilla to intercept them before they could reach Münsterland. Limbourne overheard the radio transmissions about 01:20 as the German ships turned, and alerted the other British ships. At 01:36 Charybdis's radar detected the German torpedo boats at a range of 8,100 yards (7,400 m) and she fired star shells in an unsuccessful attempt to spot them visually. About this time, T23 spotted Charybdis silhouetted against the lighter horizon and Kohlauf ordered every boat to fire all of their torpedoes. Two of these struck the cruiser, which sank shortly afterwards, and another blew the bow off Limbourne, which had to be scuttled later. The loss of the flagship threw the British into confusion as they had not worked together before the attack, and the torpedo boats successfully disengaged before the senior surviving British captain realized that he was in command.

=== Battle of the Bay of Biscay ===
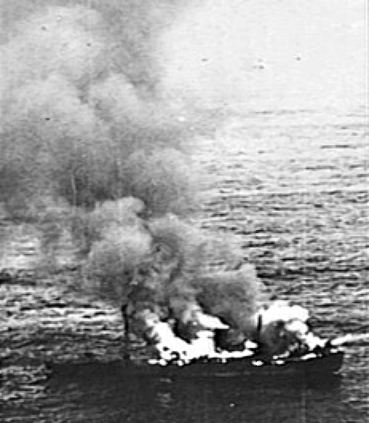
Alsterufer burning after an RAF attack

On 24–26 December T23 was one of the escorts for the 6,951 GRT blockade runner MV Osorno through the Bay of Biscay. Another blockade runner, the 2,729 GRT refrigerated cargo ship MV Alsterufer, trailed Osorno by several days and four destroyers of the 8th Destroyer Flotilla and the six torpedo boats of the 4th Flotilla set sail on 27 December to escort her through the bay. The Allies were aware of these blockade runners through their Ultra code-breaking efforts and positioned cruisers and aircraft in the Western Atlantic to intercept them in Operation Stonewall. A Consolidated B-24 Liberator heavy bomber from No. 311 Squadron RAF sank Alsterufer later that afternoon.

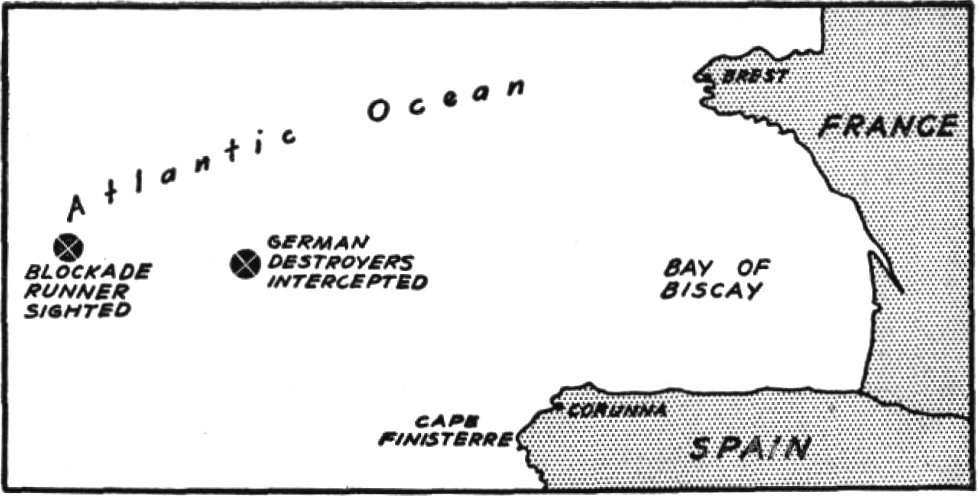
Map of the battle of the Bay of Biscay

The German ships were unaware of the sinking until the following afternoon and continued onward to the rendezvous point. They had been spotted by an American Liberator bomber on the morning of the 28th and the British light cruisers Glasgow and Enterprise, which were assigned to Stonewall, maneuvered to intercept them. By this time, the weather had gotten significantly worse and the German ships were steaming for home, hampered by the rough seas that threw spray over their forward guns which made them difficult to operate. In addition the spray severely reduced visibility and hampered the rangefinders and sights for the guns and torpedoes. Using her radar, Glasgow was the first to open fire at 13:46 at a range of 19,600 meters (21,400 yd) with Enterprise following a few minutes later. About that time, the destroyers began firing back with guns and torpedoes; the latter all missed and one hit was made on Glasgow at 14:05. Kapitän zur See Hans Erdmenger, commander of the 8th Flotilla, decided to split his forces and ordered the destroyers Z23, Z27, and T22, T25 and T26 to reverse course to the north at 14:18. The cruisers pursued the northern group and sank Z27, T25 and T26. All of the ships in the southern group, including T23, were able to successfully disengage.

=== Subsequent activities ===
In early February 1944, T23 and T22 returned to Germany via the English Channel and T23 began a refit at Bremen that lasted until June. The boat was then assigned to the 5th Torpedo Boat Flotilla operating in the Baltic. She was attached to the 6th Torpedo Boat Flotilla to help them lay a minefield in Narva Bay, off the Estonian coast, on the night of 17/18 August. The boats, T23, T22 and their sisters T30 and T32 each loaded 54 mines in Helsinki, Finland, and departed on the evening of the 17th. Shortly after midnight, they started to lay their mines, but had only just begun when T30 struck a pair of mines about 00:25 which knocked out all electrical power. About a minute after that, T32 also struck a pair of mines that blew her bow off and disabled her engines. At this T22's crew began making her mines safe and jettisoning them to clear the quarterdeck for towing. At 00:30 T30 exploded and broke in half, probably after hitting another mine. T22's crew finished jettisoning her mines at 00:40 and signaled T32 to see if she was ready to be towed. T32 replied that she was not able to be towed forward, which meant that she would have to be towed stern-first. Around 00:50 T22 began to approach T32 despite being warned that mines were present and struck two of them and blew up at around 01:14. Four minutes later, look-outs reported a motor torpedo boat moving fast aft of the ship and the hydrophones picked up engine noises. Korvettenleutnant Weinlig, thinking that the explosions that sank T22 were torpedoes rather than mines, decided that T23 needed to withdraw lest she be sunk as well, despite the presence of survivors in the water and the crippled T32. (Note: T32 was sunk by Soviet aircraft the following morning.) He radioed for shallow-draft boats to rescue the survivors at 01:20 and headed west with multiple reports of other ships nearby for the next several hours. At 01:50, T23 encountered the submarine U-679 and Weinlig was preparing to attack before she was recognized as a German submarine. The Soviets never claimed to have sunk any of the torpedo boats that night and the 01:18 spot report was undoubtedly a pinnace from T30 that was pulling survivors from the water.

On 20–21 August, T23 and her sister T28 helped to escort the heavy cruiser Prinz Eugen as she supported a German counterattack near Tukums, Latvia. As the Germans evacuated Tallinn, Estonia, in mid-September, the sisters helped to lay additional minefields in the Gulf of Finland to deny the Soviets access to the western portions of the gulf. On 22 October, T23 and T28 bombarded Soviet positions near Sworbe, on the Estonian island of Saaremaa, breaking up a Soviet attack. A month later, they provided support during a Soviet attack on 19 November, but the Germans were forced to evacuate several days later. In mid-December, the 6th Destroyer Flotilla (Z35, Z36 and Z43), reinforced by T23 and T28, was tasked to lay a new minefield between the Estonian coast and an existing minefield slightly further out to sea. T23 was to escort the other ships and the destroyers were laden with 68 mines each. The flotilla sailed on the morning of the 11th and the weather gradually worsened over the course of the day, and the spray and rain made navigation difficult. Slightly off course to the north, Z35 and Z36 blundered into the Nashorn (Rhinoceros) minefield that was only 2.5 nautical miles (4.6 km; 2.9 mi) north of the intended position of the new minefield. They both struck mines and sank around 02:00; so close to the minefield, no effort was made to rescue any survivors in the darkness.

Prinz Eugen, two destroyers, T23 and T28 supported a German counterattack against advancing Soviet forces near Cranz, East Prussia, on 29–30 January 1945. A few days later the boat escorted the heavy cruiser Admiral Scheer, together with her sisters T28 and T35 off the East Prussian coast on 2–5 February. Admiral Scheer, T23, T28 and T36 bombarded Soviet positions near Frauenburg in support of the 4th Army on 9–10 February. T23 and T28 screened the heavy cruiser Lützow as she bombarded Soviet positions south of Danzig on 27 March. The boat screened evacuation convoys from Hela, East Prussia, to friendly territory in early April. On 5 May, T23 helped ferry 45,000 refugees from East Prussia to Copenhagen, Denmark, and returned to help transport 20,000 more to Glücksburg, Germany, on the 9th.

=== Postwar activities ===
After the war, the boat was allocated to the British when the Allies divided the surviving ships of the Kriegsmarine amongst themselves in late 1945. After protests by France, the Royal Navy transferred T23 on 4 February 1946 and the French Navy renamed her L'Alsacien. She then began a lengthy overhaul in Cherbourg that replaced her radar with an American system and her 3.7 cm guns with 4 cm Bofors guns. The boat was recommissioned in December 1949 and assigned to the Aircraft Carrier Group of the Mediterranean Squadron at Toulon. L'Alsacien was later assigned to the Anti-submarine Group before she was condemned on 9 July 1954 and subsequently sold for scrap.
