= German torpedo boat T28 =

German torpedo boat

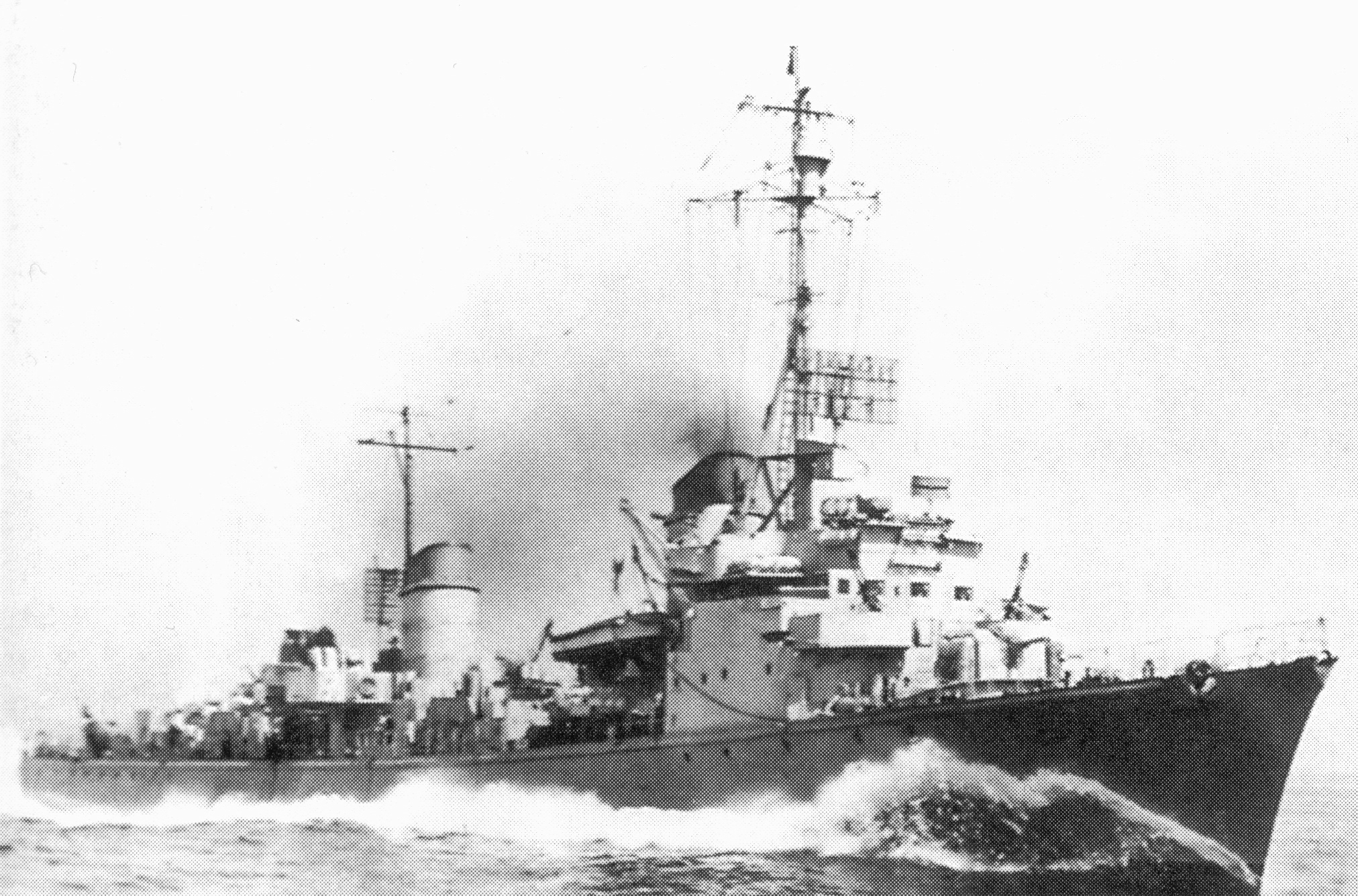
- Sister ship T35 in US service, August 1945

History

Nazi Germany
- Name: T28
- Ordered: 10 November 1939
- Builder: Schichau, Elbing, East Prussia
- Yard number: 1487
- Laid down: 24 September 1941
- Launched: 8 October 1942
- Completed: 19 June 1943
- Fate: Transferred to France as war reparations, 1946

France
- Name: Le Lorrain
- Namesake: Person from Lorraine
- Acquired: 4 February 1946
- Recommissioned: December 1949
- Out of service: 9 June 1954
- Renamed: 4 February 1946
- Stricken: 31 October 1955
- Fate: Sold for scrap, after 31 October 1955

General characteristics (as built)
- Class & type: Type 39 torpedo boat
- Displacement: 1,294 t (1,274 long tons) (standard); 1,754 t (1,726 long tons) (deep load)
- Length: 102.5 m (336 ft 3 in) o/a
- Beam: 10 m (32 ft 10 in)
- Draft: 3.22 m (10 ft 7 in)
- Installed power: 4 × water-tube boilers; 32,000 shp (24,000 kW)
- Propulsion: 2 × shafts; 2 × geared steam turbine sets
- Speed: 33.5 knots (62.0 km/h; 38.6 mph)
- Range: 2,400 nmi (4,400 km; 2,800 mi) at 19 knots (35 km/h; 22 mph)
- Complement: 206
- Sensors & processing systems: S-Gerät sonar; FuMO 21 radar
- Armament: 4 × single 10.5 cm (4.1 in) guns; 2 × twin 3.7 cm (1.5 in) AA guns; 1 × quadruple, 2 × single 2 cm (0.8 in) AA guns; 2 × triple 533 mm (21 in) torpedo tubes; 30–60 mines; 4 × depth charge launchers

The German torpedo boat T28 was one of fifteen Type 39 torpedo boats built for the Kriegsmarine (German Navy) during World War II. Completed in mid-1943, the ship was transferred to France in January 1944 and slightly damaged by British aircraft en route. She attacked Allied ships during the Invasion of Normandy in June 1944 and returned to Germany the following month. T28 was assigned to support German operations in the Baltic Sea. She escorted convoys and larger warships bombarding Soviet troops as well as bombarding them herself. In May T28 helped to evacuate troops and refugees from advancing Soviet forces. The ship was allocated to Great Britain after the war, but she was transferred to France in 1946. The French Navy renamed her Le Lorrain and recommissioned her in 1949. After serving with different units of the Mediterranean Squadron, she was condemned in 1955 and subsequently sold for scrap.

== Design and description ==
The Type 39 torpedo boat was conceived as a general-purpose design, much larger than preceding German torpedo boats. The ships had an overall length of 102.5 meters (336 ft 3 in) and were 97 meters (318 ft 3 in) long at the waterline. They had a beam of 10 meters (32 ft 10 in), a draft of 3.22 meters (10 ft 7 in) at deep load and displaced 1,294 metric tons (1,274 long tons) at standard load and 1,754 metric tons (1,726 long tons) at deep load. Their crew numbered 206 officers and sailors. The Type 39s were fitted with a pair of geared steam turbine sets, each driving one propeller, using steam from four high-pressure water-tube boilers. The turbines were designed to produce 32,000 shaft horsepower (24,000 kW) which was intended give the ships a maximum speed of 33.5 knots (62.0 km/h; 38.6 mph). They carried enough fuel oil to give them a range of 2,400 nautical miles (4,400 km; 2,800 mi) at 19 knots (35 km/h; 22 mph).

As built, the Type 39 ships mounted four 10.5 cm (4.1 in) SK C/32 guns in single mounts protected by gun shields; one forward of the superstructure, one between the funnels, and two aft, one superfiring over the other. Anti-aircraft defense was provided by four 3.7 cm (1.5 in) SK C/30 AA guns in two twin-gun mounts on platforms abaft the rear funnel, six 2 cm (0.8 in) C/38 guns in one quadruple mount on the aft superstructure and a pair of single mounts on the bridge wings. They carried six above-water 533 mm (21 in) torpedo tubes in two triple mounts amidships and could also carry 30 mines; the full complement of 60 mines made the ships top-heavy which could be dangerous in bad weather. For anti-submarine work the ships were fitted with a S-Gerät sonar and four depth charge launchers. The Type 39s were equipped with a FuMO 21 (Note: Funkmess-Ortung (Radio-direction finder, active ranging)) radar and various FumB (Note: Funkmess-Beobachtung (Passive radar detector).) radar detectors were installed late in the war. By early 1945, the 2 cm mounts on the bridge wings and the twin 3.7 cm mounts may have been replaced by single mounts for 3.7 cm guns, either the Flak M42 or the Flak M43, or 4 cm (1.6 in) Bofors guns.

== Construction and career ==
Originally ordered as a Type 37 torpedo boat on 30 March 1939, T28 was reordered on 10 November 1939 from Schichau. She was laid down on 24 September 1941 at their Elbing, East Prussia, shipyard as yard number 1487, launched on 8 October 1942 and commissioned on 19 June 1943. After working up, T28 and her sister T29 arrived in Western France during late January 1944. En route the two torpedo boats were shelled by British coastal artillery and attacked by a pair of British Fairey Albacore torpedo bombers that caused some minor leaks in T28's boiler room from splinter damage. The ship began a long refit upon her arrival that was not completed until early June. As the Allies began landing in Normandy on 6 June, the 5th Torpedo Boat Flotilla, now consisting of T28 and the torpedo boats Falke, Jaguar and Möwe, sortied multiple times from Le Havre over the next week in attempts to sink Allied shipping. Despite the expenditure of over 50 torpedoes and large quantities of ammunition, they were generally unsuccessful, only sinking the destroyer HNoMS Svenner on 6 June. T28 was not damaged during the air raid by the Royal Air Force on the night of 14/15 June that sank Falke and Jaguar. On the night of 21/22 July, T28 and three E-boats sailed from Le Havre to Boulogne and fought a brief action with the destroyer HMS Melbreak en route. The torpedo boat reached Germany on the 27th, having evaded multiple Allied ships on her voyage.

On 20–21 August T28 and her sister T23 helped to escort the heavy cruiser Prinz Eugen as she supported a German counterattack near Tukums, Latvia. As the Germans evacuated Tallinn, Estonia, in mid-September, the sisters helped to lay additional minefields in the Gulf of Finland to deny the Soviets access to the western portions of the gulf. On 22 October, T28 and T23 bombarded Soviet positions near Sworbe, on the Estonian island of Saaremaa, breaking up a Soviet attack. A month later, they provided support during a Soviet attack on 19 November, but the Germans were forced to evacuate several days later. In mid-December, the 6th Destroyer Flotilla (Z35, Z36 and Z43), reinforced by T23 and T28, was tasked to lay a new minefield between the Estonian coast and an existing minefield slightly further out to sea. T23 was to escort the other ships and the destroyers were laden with 68 mines each while T28 carried 46. The flotilla sailed on the morning of the 11th and the weather gradually worsened over the course of the day, and the spray and rain made navigation difficult. Slightly off course to the north, Z35 and Z36 blundered into the Nashorn (Rhinoceros) minefield that was only 2.5 nautical miles (4.6 km; 2.9 mi) north of the intended position of the new minefield. They both struck mines and sank around 02:00; so close to the minefield, no effort was made to rescue any survivors in the darkness. T28 was refitted in Gotenhafen from October to December.

Prinz Eugen, two destroyers, T28 and T23 supported a German counterattack against advancing Soviet forces near Cranz, East Prussia, on 29–30 January 1945. A few days later the ship escorted the heavy cruiser Admiral Scheer, together with her sisters T23 and T35 off the East Prussian coast on 2–5 February. Admiral Scheer, T23, T28 and T36 bombarded Soviet positions near Frauenburg in support of the 4th Army on 9–10 February. T28 and T23 screened the heavy cruiser Lützow as she bombarded Soviet positions south of Danzig on 27 March. The ship screened evacuation convoys from Hela, East Prussia, to friendly territory in early April. On 5 May, T28 helped to ferry 45,000 refugees from East Prussia to Copenhagen, Denmark, and returned to transport 20,000 more to Glücksburg, Germany, on the 9th.

=== Postwar activities ===
The ship was allocated to the British when the Allies divided the surviving ships of the Kriegsmarine amongst themselves in late 1945. After protests by France, the Royal Navy transferred T28 on 4 February 1946 and the French Navy renamed her Le Lorrain. She then began a lengthy overhaul in Cherbourg that replaced her radar with an American system and her 3.7 cm guns with 4 cm Bofors guns. The ship was recommissioned in December 1949 and assigned to the Aircraft Carrier Group of the Mediterranean Squadron at Toulon. Le Lorrain was later assigned to the Anti-submarine Group and then served as a trials ship before she was condemned on 31 October 1955 and subsequently sold for scrap.
