= German torpedo boat T33 =

German torpedo boat

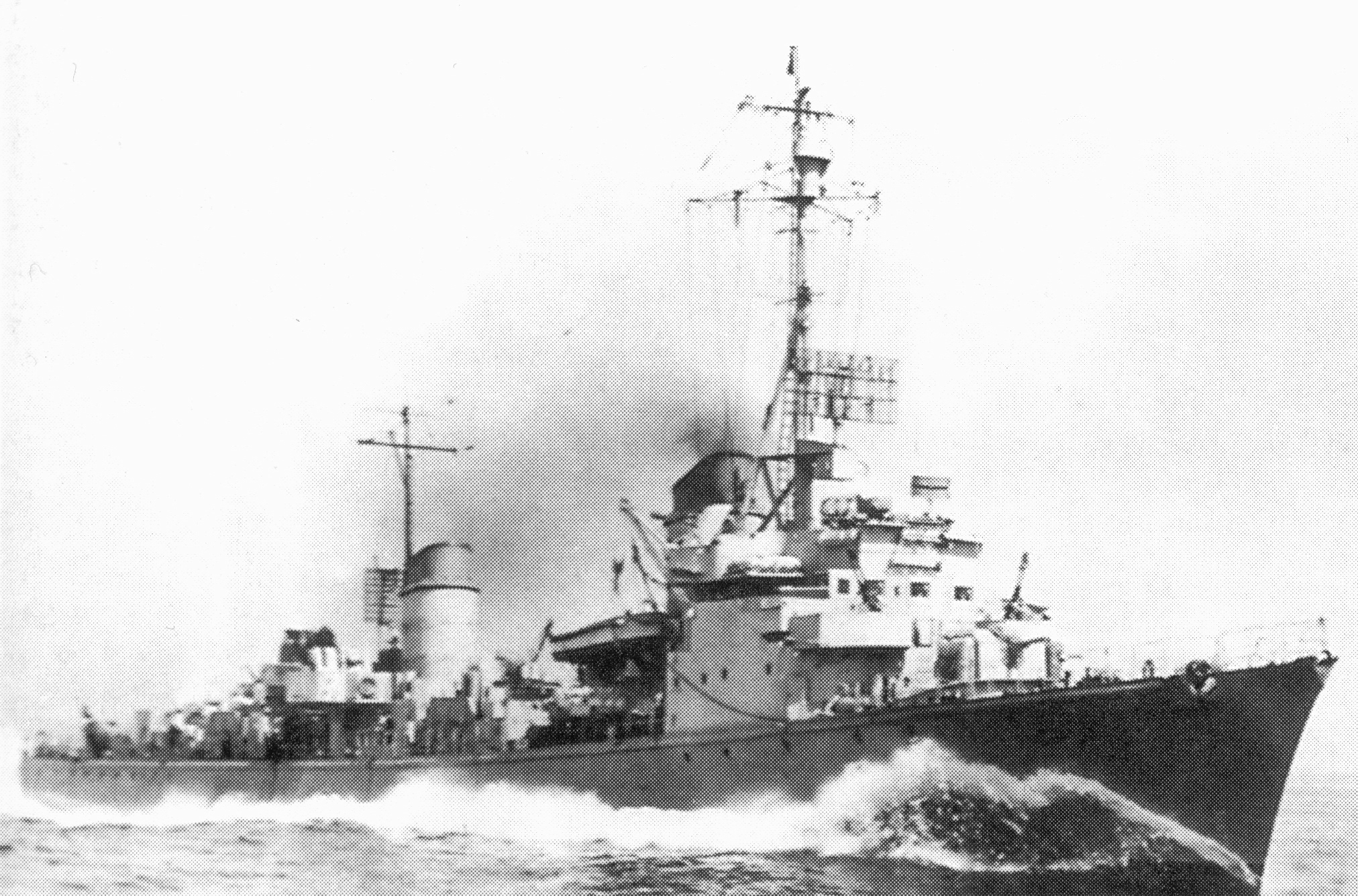
- Sister ship T35 in US service, August 1945

History

Nazi Germany
- Name: T33
- Ordered: 20 January 1941
- Builder: Schichau, Elbing, East Prussia
- Yard number: 1515
- Launched: 1943
- Completed: 16 June 1944
- Fate: Transferred to the Soviet Union as war reparations, 1 January 1946

Soviet Union
- Acquired: 1 January 1946
- Renamed: Primerny, 1 January 1946; PKZ-63, 28 December 1954
- Reclassified: As an accommodation ship, 30 November 1954
- Fate: Listed for scrapping, 9 November 1956

General characteristics (as built)
- Class & type: Type 39 torpedo boat
- Displacement: 1,294 t (1,274 long tons) (standard); 1,754 t (1,726 long tons) (deep load)
- Length: 102.5 m (336 ft 3 in) o/a
- Beam: 10 m (32 ft 10 in)
- Draft: 3.22 m (10 ft 7 in)
- Installed power: 4 × water-tube boilers; 32,000 shp (24,000 kW)
- Propulsion: 2 × shafts; 2 × geared steam turbine sets
- Speed: 33.5 knots (62.0 km/h; 38.6 mph)
- Range: 2,400 nmi (4,400 km; 2,800 mi) at 19 knots (35 km/h; 22 mph)
- Complement: 206
- Sensors & processing systems: S-Gerät sonar; FuMO 21 radar
- Armament: 4 × single 10.5 cm (4.1 in) guns; 2 × twin 3.7 cm (1.5 in) AA guns; 3 × quadruple 2 cm (0.8 in) AA guns; 2 × triple 533 mm (21 in) torpedo tubes; 30–60 mines; 4 × depth charge launchers

The German torpedo boat T33 was one of fifteen Type 39 torpedo boats built for the Kriegsmarine (German Navy) during World War II. Completed in mid-1944, the boat was assigned to convoy escort duties and supporting German forces in the Baltic. She escorted a heavy cruiser in January 1945 as she bombarded Soviet troops and helped to evacuate troops and refugees from advancing Soviet forces in May. T33 was allocated to the Soviet Union after the war and was renamed Primerny. She served with the Baltic Fleet until 1954 when the ship was converted into an accommodation ship and renamed PKZ-63. She was turned over to be scrapped on 9 November 1956 and subsequently broken up.

== Design and description ==
The Type 39 torpedo boat was conceived as a general-purpose design, much larger than preceding German torpedo boats. The boats had an overall length of 102.5 meters (336 ft 3 in) and were 97 meters (318 ft 3 in) long at the waterline. They had a beam of 10 meters (32 ft 10 in), a draft of 3.22 meters (10 ft 7 in) at deep load and displaced 1,294 metric tons (1,274 long tons) at standard load and 1,754 metric tons (1,726 long tons) at deep load. Their crew numbered 206 officers and sailors. The Type 39s were fitted with a pair of geared steam turbine sets, each driving one propeller, using steam from four high-pressure water-tube boilers. The turbines were designed to produce 32,000 shaft horsepower (24,000 kW) which was intended give the ships a maximum speed of 33.5 knots (62.0 km/h; 38.6 mph). They carried enough fuel oil to give them a range of 2,400 nautical miles (4,400 km; 2,800 mi) at 19 knots (35 km/h; 22 mph).

As built, the Type 39 ships mounted four 10.5 cm (4.1 in) SK C/32 guns in single mounts protected by gun shields; one forward of the superstructure, one between the funnels, and two aft, one superfiring over the other. Anti-aircraft defense was provided by four 3.7 cm (1.5 in) SK C/30 AA guns in two twin-gun mounts on platforms abaft the rear funnel and a dozen 2 cm (0.8 in) C/38 guns. One quadruple mount was positioned on the aft superstructure and two more were fitted on the bridge wings. They carried six above-water 533 mm (21 in) torpedo tubes in two triple mounts amidships and could also carry 30 mines; the full complement of 60 mines made the ships top-heavy which could be dangerous in bad weather. For anti-submarine work the boats were fitted with a S-Gerät sonar and four depth charge launchers. The Type 39s were equipped with a FuMO 21 radar (Note: Funkmess-Ortung (Radio-direction finder, active ranging)) and various FumB (Note: Funkmess-Beobachtung (Passive radar detector).) radar detectors were installed late in the war.

== Construction and career ==
T33 was ordered on 20 January 1941 from Schichau, laid down at their Elbing, East Prussia, shipyard as yard number 1515, launched in 1943 and commissioned on 16 June 1944. After working up, the boat was deployed to support German forces operating in the Baltic. She was one of the escorts for the heavy cruiser Prinz Eugen as the latter ship supported a German counterattack against advancing Soviet forces near Cranz, East Prussia, on 29–30 January 1945. Together with a pair of destroyers, T33 bombarded Soviet positions near Kolberg from 11 to 18 March to cover the evacuation of the city. The boat screened evacuation convoys from Hela, to friendly territory in early April. On 10 April, T33 towed the destroyer Z43 after she had been badly damaged by a mine. On 5 May, she helped to ferry 45,000 refugees from East Prussia to Copenhagen, Denmark, and returned to help transport 20,000 more to Glücksburg, Germany, on the 9th.

T33 was allocated to the Soviet Union when the Allies divided the surviving ships of the Kriegsmarine amongst themselves in late 1945, and was assigned to the Baltic Fleet on 5 November. She was taken over by a Soviet crew on New Year's Day 1946, who raised the Soviet naval jack aboard her four days later. Renamed Primerny on 13 February 1946, the newly reclassified destroyer joined the North Baltic Fleet two days later. She served with the latter until 30 November 1954, when she was removed from combat duty and converted into a floating barracks before being renamed PKZ-63 on 28 December. The vessel was transferred for scrapping on 9 November 1956, which was carried out by the Main Directorate for the Procurement, Processing and Sale of Secondary Ferrous Metals at Tallinn during 1957 and 1958.
