= Type 39 torpedo boat =

World War II-era German torpedo boats

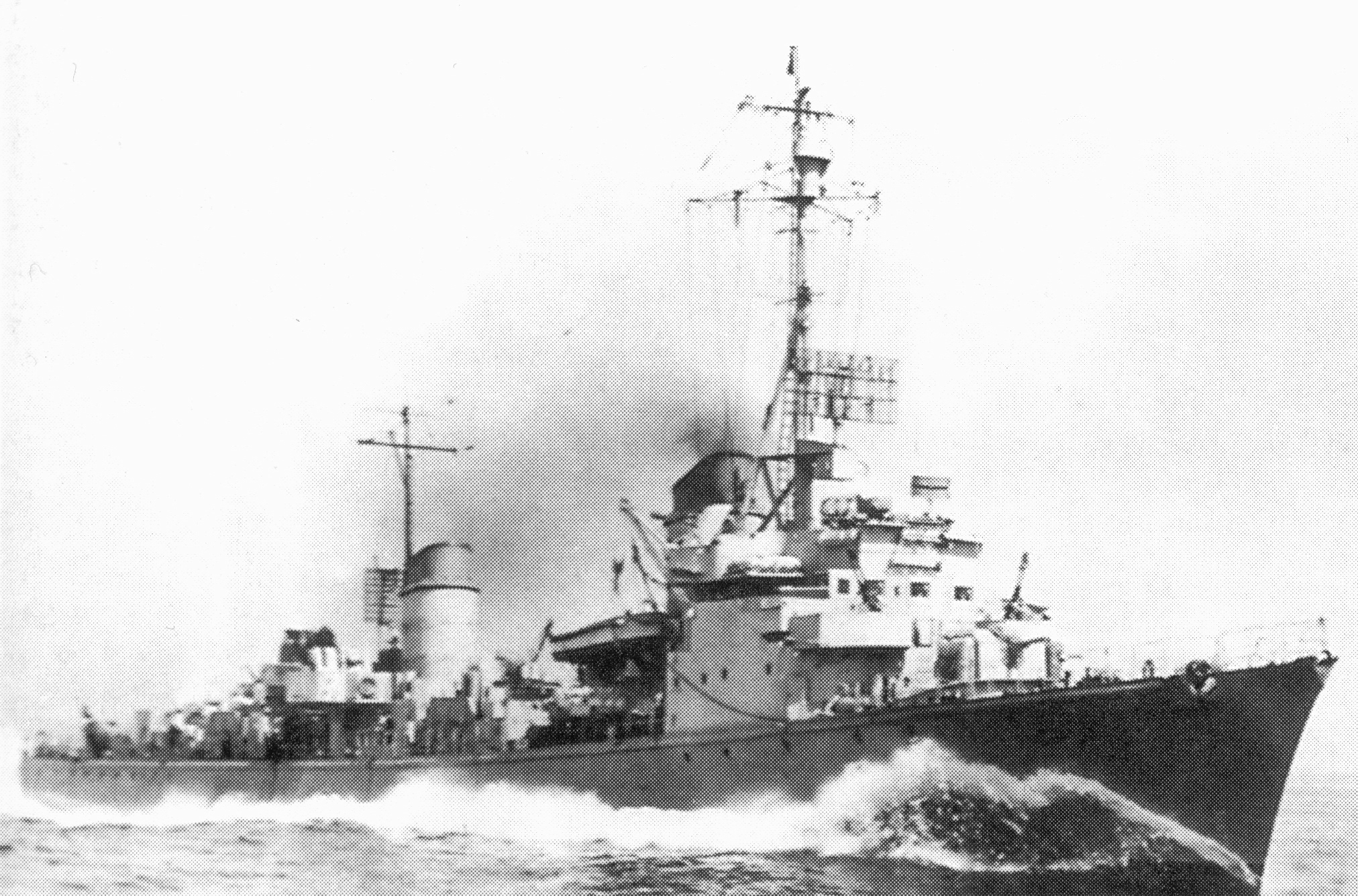
- T-35 in US service, August 1945

Class overview
- Name: Type 39
- Builders: Schichau-Werke, Elbing
- Operators: Kriegsmarine; Soviet Navy; French Navy; United States Navy
- Preceded by: Type 37 torpedo boat
- Succeeded by: Type 40 torpedo boat
- Built: 1940–1944
- In commission: 1942–1955
- Planned: 39
- Completed: 15
- Canceled: 24
- Lost: 11

General characteristics (T22 as built)
- Type: Torpedo boat
- Displacement: 1,294 t (1,274 long tons) (standard)
- Length: 102.5 m (336 ft 3 in) o/a
- Beam: 10 m (32 ft 10 in)
- Draft: 3.22 m (10 ft 7 in)
- Installed power: 4 × water-tube boilers; 32,000 shp (24,000 kW)
- Propulsion: 2 × shafts; 2 × geared steam turbine sets
- Speed: 33.5 knots (62.0 km/h; 38.6 mph)
- Range: 2,400 nmi (4,400 km; 2,800 mi) at 19 knots (35 km/h; 22 mph)
- Complement: 206
- Sensors & processing systems: S-Gerät sonar; FuMO 21 radar
- Armament: 4 × single 10.5 cm (4.1 in) guns; 2 × twin 3.7 cm (1.5 in) AA guns; 1 × quadruple, 2 × single 2 cm (0.8 in) AA guns; 2 × triple 533 mm (21 in) torpedo tubes; 30–60 mines; 4 × depth charge launchers

The Type 1939 torpedo boats, also known as the Elbing class by the Allies, were a group of 15 torpedo boats that were built for Nazi Germany's Kriegsmarine during World War II.

The first eight ships to be completed were sent to western France in pairs after they finished working up from late 1942 through the beginning of 1944. They were tasked to escort convoys, blockade runners and submarines through the English Channel and the Bay of Biscay. The ships also laid minefields. Not long after the first pair arrived, they sank a British cruiser and an escort destroyer without loss or damage to themselves in the Battle of Sept-Îles in October 1943. 2 months later, two ships were sunk by British cruisers in the Battle of the Bay of Biscay in December 1943. During the action of 26 April 1944 and subsequent operations, Allied forces intercepted three Type 39s of which two were lost, although they sank a Canadian destroyer in exchange. Of the two remaining ships based in France when the Allies invaded Normandy (Operation Neptune) on 6 June, one ship helped to sink a Norwegian destroyer before escaping to Germany and the other was sunk by fighter-bombers in August.

All of the remaining Type 39s were committed to the Baltic Sea from April 1944, where they escorted convoys, laid mines and provided naval gunfire support to Axis forces and operations. One ship was sunk by the Soviets while supporting Finnish operations in the Gulf of Finland in June, three were sunk in August when they accidentally entered an existing German minefield when they were attempting to lay a new one, and another sank after hitting a mine during gunnery training in November. The Type 39s began bombarding Soviet positions in October during the Soviet Moonsund Landing Operation as the Germans began evacuating the islands off the west coast of Estonia, and they continued to do so for the rest of the war, often in conjunction with cruisers. In May, with the collapse of Germany imminent, their role changed to evacuating people from areas that were threatened by the advancing Soviets, and they helped to rescue hundreds of thousands before the German surrender. One ship was lost to Soviet aircraft during this time.

Four Type 39s survived the war and were seized by the Allies as war reparations. The United States Navy briefly evaluated one before turning it over to the French in 1947 as spares for their pair that the French Navy kept in service until 1954–1955. The Soviet Union used their ship until about the same time before scrapping it in 1956.

== Background and design ==
Grand Admiral (Großadmiral) Erich Raeder, commander-in-chief of the Kriegsmarine, was unhappy with the proposed Type 1938B-class destroyer in early 1939 and ordered that a smaller 1,265-metric-ton (1,245-long-ton), 95-meter-long (311 ft 8 in), all-purpose torpedo boat design be evaluated on 8 July. The beginning of World War II in September 1939 caused the Kriegsmarine to re-evaluate its shipbuilding program, and it cancelled the Type 1938Bs in favor of more Type 1936A-class destroyers. The smaller design emerged as the Type 39 torpedo boat that was a radical change from the preceding, and much smaller, torpedo boats like the Type 35 and Type 37 classes that were specialized for torpedo attack and had limited utility outside that role. The Type 39s used the same troublesome high-pressure boilers as the earlier designs, but their propulsion machinery was arranged into separate units so that one hit could not completely immobilize the ship.

The ships had an overall length of 102.5 meters (336 ft 3 in) and were 97 meters (318 ft 3 in) long at the waterline. They had a beam of 10 meters (32 ft 10 in), and a mean draft of 3.25 meters (10 ft 8 in) at deep load. The Type 39s displaced 1,318 metric tons (1,297 long tons) at standard load and 1,780 metric tons (1,750 long tons) at deep load. Their hull was divided into 13 watertight compartments and it was fitted with a double bottom that covered 67–69% of their length. The Type 39s were considered excellent seaboats and were very maneuverable. Their crew numbered 206 officers and sailors.

The Type 39 ships had two sets of Wagner geared steam turbines, each driving a single three-bladed 2.5-meter (8 ft 2 in) propeller, using steam provided by four Wagner water-tube boilers that operated at a pressure of 70 kg/cm^{2} (6,865 kPa; 996 psi) and a temperature of 460 °C (860 °F). The turbines were designed to produce 32,000 shaft horsepower (24,000 kW) for a speed of 33.5 knots (62.0 km/h; 38.6 mph). The ships carried a maximum of 375 metric tons (369 long tons) of fuel oil, which gave a range of 2,400 nautical miles (4,400 km; 2,800 mi) at 19 knots (35 km/h; 22 mph). In service the steam consumption of the engine-room auxiliary machinery proved to be excessive, and the boilers could not generate enough steam to drive the turbines at their designed capacity. This reduced the Type 39s' top speed to 31 knots (57 km/h; 36 mph) and their range to 2,085 nmi (3,861 km; 2,399 mi) at 19 knots.

=== Armament and sensors ===
The main armament of the Type 39 class consisted four 42-caliber 10.5 cm (4.1 in) SK C/32 (Note: In Kriegsmarine gun nomenclature, SK stands for Schiffskanone (ship's gun), C/32 stands for Constructionjahr (Construction year) 1932) guns in single mounts; one forward of the superstructure, one between the funnels, and two aft, one superfiring over the other. Its mount had a range of elevation from −10° to +70° and the gun fired 15.1-kilogram (33 lb) projectiles at a muzzle velocity of 785 m/s (2,580 ft/s). It had a range of 15,175 meters (16,596 yd) at an elevation of +44.4°.

Anti-aircraft defense was provided by a pair of twin 80-caliber 3.7 cm (1.5 in) SK C/30 anti-aircraft (AA) gun mounts positioned on a platform abaft the rear funnel. The power-operated mount had a maximum elevation of 85° which gave the gun a ceiling of less than 6,800 meters (22,300 ft); horizontal range was 8,500 meters (9,300 yd) at an elevation of 35.7°. The single-shot SK C/30 fired 0.748-kilogram (1.65 lb) projectiles at a muzzle velocity of 1,000 m/s (3,300 ft/s) at a rate of 30 rounds per minute. The ships were also fitted with six 2 cm (0.8 in) C/38 guns in one quadruple mount on the aft superstructure (Note: T22, the first ship finished, was completed without her quadruple mount, although it was installed later.) and a pair of single mounts on the bridge wings. The gun had an effective rate of fire of about 120 rounds per minute. Its 0.12-kilogram (0.26 lb) projectiles were fired at a muzzle velocity of 875 m/s (2,870 ft/s) which gave it a ceiling of 3,700 meters (12,100 ft) and a maximum horizontal range of 4,800 meters (5,200 yd). Each ship carried 2,000 rounds per gun.

The Type 39s were also equipped with six above-water 533 mm (21 in) torpedo tubes in two triple mounts amidships and could also carry 30 mines; the full complement of 60 mines made the ships top-heavy which could be dangerous in bad weather. They used the G7a torpedo which had a 300-kilogram (660 lb) warhead and three speed/range settings: 14,000 meters (15,000 yd) at 30 knots (56 km/h; 35 mph); 8,000 meters (8,700 yd) at 40 knots (74 km/h; 46 mph) and 6,000 meters (6,600 yd) at 44 knots (81 km/h; 51 mph). For anti-submarine work the ships were fitted with a S-Gerät sonar and four depth charge launchers. The Type 39s were equipped with a FuMO 21 (Note: Funkmess-Ortung (Radio-direction finder, active ranging)) search radar.

=== Modifications ===
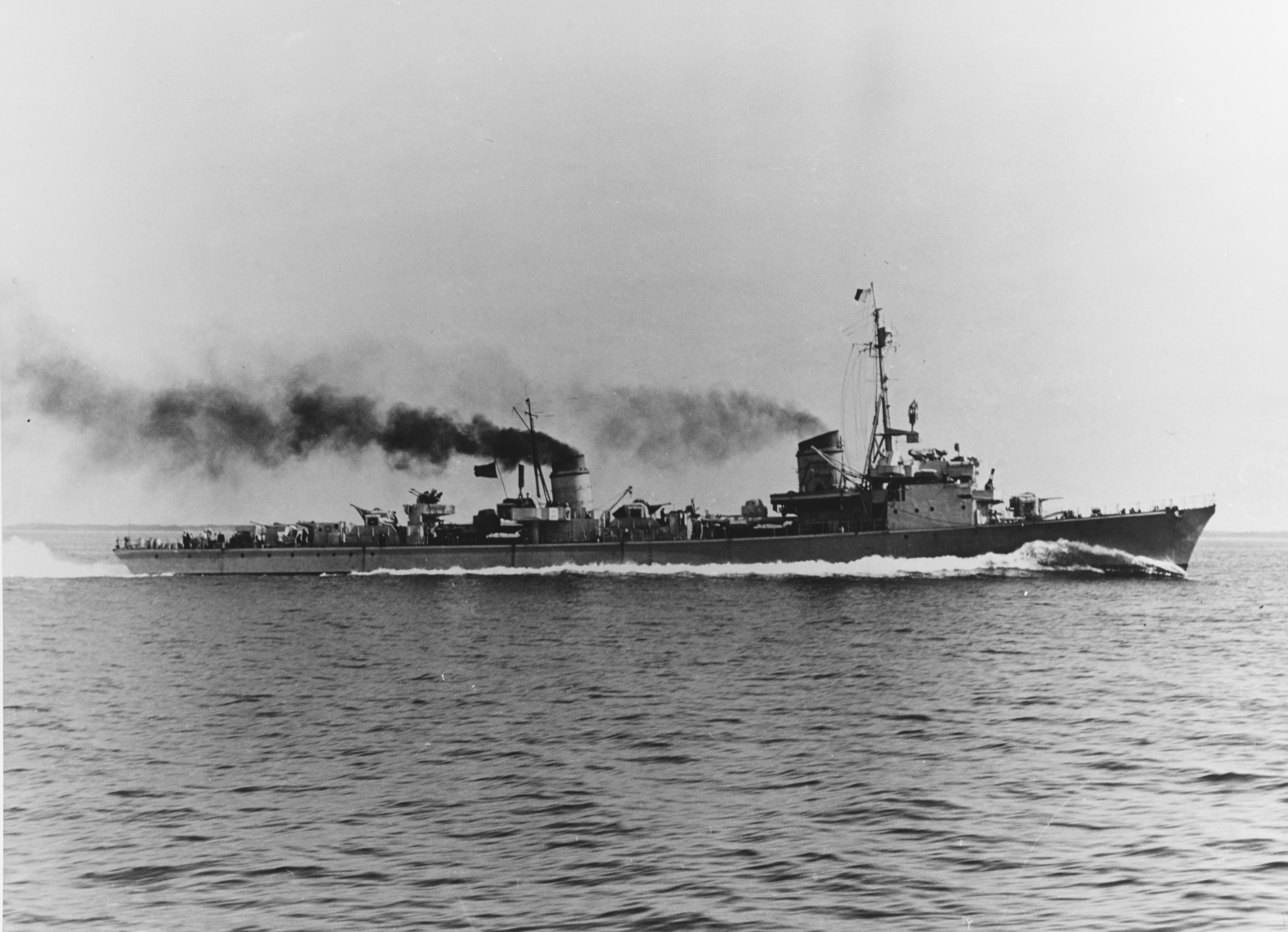
The former T35 (as DD-935) running trials off Boston, Massachusetts, 14 September 1945

The bridge wing 2 cm mounts were replaced by twin mounts in 1943–1944. In January–February 1944, T22, T23, T24 and T27 had their bridge wing guns replaced by quadruple mounts, FuMB7 (Note: Funkmess-Beobachtung (Passive radio-direction finder)) "Naxos" and FuMB8 "Wanz G" radar detectors fitted and a 2-meter (6 ft 7 in) rangefinder installed on the searchlight platform amidships. Other boats received a FuMO 63 K Hohentwiel radar on the searchlight platform and all of them were fitted with a variety of radar detectors late in the war. The 1944–1945 anti-aircraft suite for these ships is not known in detail. Either T23 or T28 received single 3.7 cm, either the Flak M42 or the Flak M43, or 4 cm (1.6 in) Bofors guns in lieu of the bridge wing guns and the twin 3.7 cm SK C/30 guns. T33 and T36 may also have had two twin-gun 2 cm mounts forward of the bridge.

== Construction ==
Before the war the Kriegsmarine planned to build 39 Type 39s, T22–T60, in an ambitious building schedule such that T52 was expected to be completed on 1 April 1942. The beginning of World War II in September 1939 disrupted its plans and T31–T60 were dropped from the program, although T31–T36 were later reinstated. The ships were ordered in two batches from Schichau, T22–T30 on 10 November 1939 (originally as Type 37 torpedo boats), followed by T31–T36 on 20 January 1941. All were built at the company's shipyard in Elbing, East Prussia, (now Elbląg, Poland) hence the Allied name for the class. Construction was delayed by shortages of labor and materials.

== Ships ==
Construction data
Number	Laid down	Launched	Completed	Fate
T22	1 July 1940	20 July 1941	28 February 1942	Sunk by mine, 18 August 1944
T23	1 August 1940	14 June 1941	14 June 1942	Served in the French Navy as L'Alsacien; condemned, 1955
T24	21 September 1940	13 September 1941	17 October 1942	Sunk by aircraft, 24 August 1944
T25	30 November 1940	1 December 1941	12 November 1942	Sunk by torpedo, 28 December 1943
T26	10 May 1941	26 March 1942	28 February 1943	Sunk by torpedo, 28 December 1943
T27	2 July 1941	20 June 1942	17 April 1943	Ran aground, 28/29 April 1944, subsequently destroyed, 6 May
T28	24 September 1941	8 October 1942	19 June 1943	Served in the French Navy as Le Lorrain; condemned, 1954
T29	12 December 1941	16 January 1943	21 August 1943	Sunk by gunfire, 26 April 1944
T30	10 April 1942	13 March 1943	24 October 1943	Sunk by mine, 18 August 1944
T31	29 June 1942	22 May 1943	5 February 1944	Sunk by torpedo, 20 June 1944
T32	27 October 1942	17 April 1943	8 May 1944	Sunk by mine, 18 August 1944
T33	20 January 1943	4 September 1943	16 June 1944	Served in the Soviet Navy as Primerny; scrapped 1957
T34	5 March 1943	23 October 1943	12 August 1944	Sunk by mine, 20 November 1944
T35	20 April 1943	12 December 1943	7 October 1944	Served in the United States Navy as DD-935; transferred to France, 1947; condemned, 3 October 1952
T36	10 June 1943	5 February 1944	9 December 1944	Sunk by aircraft, 5 May 1945

== Service history ==
The first two ships completed, T22 and T23, were the first to be deployed to France when they arrived there in October–November 1942. Together with other torpedo boats, they escorted Italian blockade runners in their attempts to break out into the Atlantic through the Bay of Biscay in November and again in April 1943. The following month they were deployed to the English Channel where they laid minefields in May and June. The sisters returned to the bay in July, reinforced by the arrival of T24 and T25, and they were all grouped together in the 4th Torpedo Boat Flotilla. They were tasked to escort submarines, convoys and blockade runners through the bay for the next several months, interspersed with the occasional minelaying mission.

T26 and T27 arrived in September and were also assigned to the 4th Flotilla. On 22/23 October the flotilla was providing distant cover for the blockade runner Münsterland as she sailed up the Channel when they discovered a British force attempting to intercept her off the coast of Brittany. The torpedo boats maneuvered to attack them and they fired all of their torpedoes before the British could spot them visually. Aware that they were out-gunned, the flotilla commander successfully disengaged before the British could recover from the successful attack. Two torpedoes sank the light cruiser HMS Charybdis and another blew off the bow of the escort destroyer HMS Limbourne, which later had to be scuttled.

=== Battle of the Bay of Biscay ===
In December 1943, two blockade runners arriving from Japan attempted to pass through the bay. The Allies were aware of them through their Ultra code-breaking efforts and positioned cruisers and aircraft in the Western Atlantic to intercept them in Operation Stonewall. The first ship reached France, but the second one was destroyed by Allied aircraft unbeknownst to the Germans. They had sent the 8th Destroyer Flotilla and the 4th Torpedo Boat Flotilla to escort the ship home; after she failed to arrive at the rendezvous point, the German ships turned for home in very heavy seas that greatly degraded the ability of the torpedo boats to use their guns and torpedoes. An Allied bomber had spotted them on the morning of 28 December and the German ships were intercepted by the British light cruisers Glasgow and Enterprise that afternoon. After unsuccessful torpedo attacks by the destroyers, Kapitän zur See (Captain) Hans Erdmenger, commander of the 8th Flotilla, decided to split his forces and ordered the destroyers Z23, Z27, and T22, T25 and T26 to reverse course to the north. The cruisers pursued the northern group and sank Z27, T25 and T26. All of the ships in the southern group, including Z23, T24 and T27 were able to successfully disengage.

=== Subsequent activities in the West ===
T28 and T29 arrived in France in January 1944 to relieve T22 and T23 which returned to Germany for refits in February. T28 began a long refit upon her arrival that was not completed until early June. After laying a minefield off the Sept-Îles on the north coast of Brittany on the night of 25/26 April, the 4th Flotilla, now consisting of T24, T27 and T29, was engaged by an Allied force that consisted of the light cruiser HMS Black Prince and the destroyers HMS Ashanti, HMCS Athabaskan, HMCS Haida and HMCS Huron off the Île de Batz. The Allied ships were faster than the torpedo boats and closed the range despite the German attempt to disengage. The destroyers began firing at T24 and T27 and one hit significantly reduced the latter's speed; Korvettenkapitän (Lieutenant Commander) Franz Kohlauf, the flotilla commander, ordered her into Morlaix Bay and the Allied ships lost her radar reflection amongst the rocks of the bay. A shell later disabled T29's rudder and Ashanti and Huron concentrated on T29 while Haida and Athabaskan continued their pursuit of T24. They disengaged before T24 reached Saint-Malo, and returned to help sink T29.

After emergency repairs, T27 joined T24 in Saint-Malo during the night of 26/27 April. The sisters departed for Brest on the night of 28/29 April and were intercepted by Haida and Athabaskan off Île Vierge. The Germans turned away, firing all of their torpedoes as they turned. One of T24's torpedoes hit Athabaskan which blew up shortly afterward and sank. Haida pursued T27, badly damaging her. While maneuvering, T27 accidentally ran aground and the Canadian destroyer continued to engage until she started a large fire and then returned to the site where Athabaskan had sunk to rescue survivors. T24 and a pair of minesweepers failed in their attempt to pull T27 off. British motor torpedo boats (MTB) and aircraft destroyed her wreck in early May. The 4th Torpedo Boat Flotilla was then disbanded and T24 was assigned to the 8th Destroyer Flotilla.

As the Allies began landing in Normandy on 6 June, the 5th Torpedo Boat Flotilla, now consisting of T28 and three older torpedo boats, sortied multiple times from Le Havre over the next week in attempts to sink Allied shipping. Despite the expenditure of over 50 torpedoes and large quantities of ammunition, they were generally unsuccessful, only sinking the destroyer HNoMS Svenner on 6 June. On the night of 8/9 June, the four ships of the 8th Flotilla set out for Cherbourg, but were intercepted by eight Allied destroyers of the 10th Destroyer Flotilla in the Battle of Ushant. The German ships had been spotted first and the British opened fire, with the Germans responding with a four-torpedo salvo from each destroyer that missed when the Allied ships turned to evade them, although T24, the trailing ship in the formation, did not fire because she had no visible targets. The British fire was extremely effective, with Z24, immediately ahead of the torpedo boat, badly damaged only moments after firing her first salvo. She was able to lay smoke and disengage, followed by T24. Haida and Huron pursued the pair until they passed over a British minefield and lost track of the German ships after the Canadian ships were forced to detour around it.

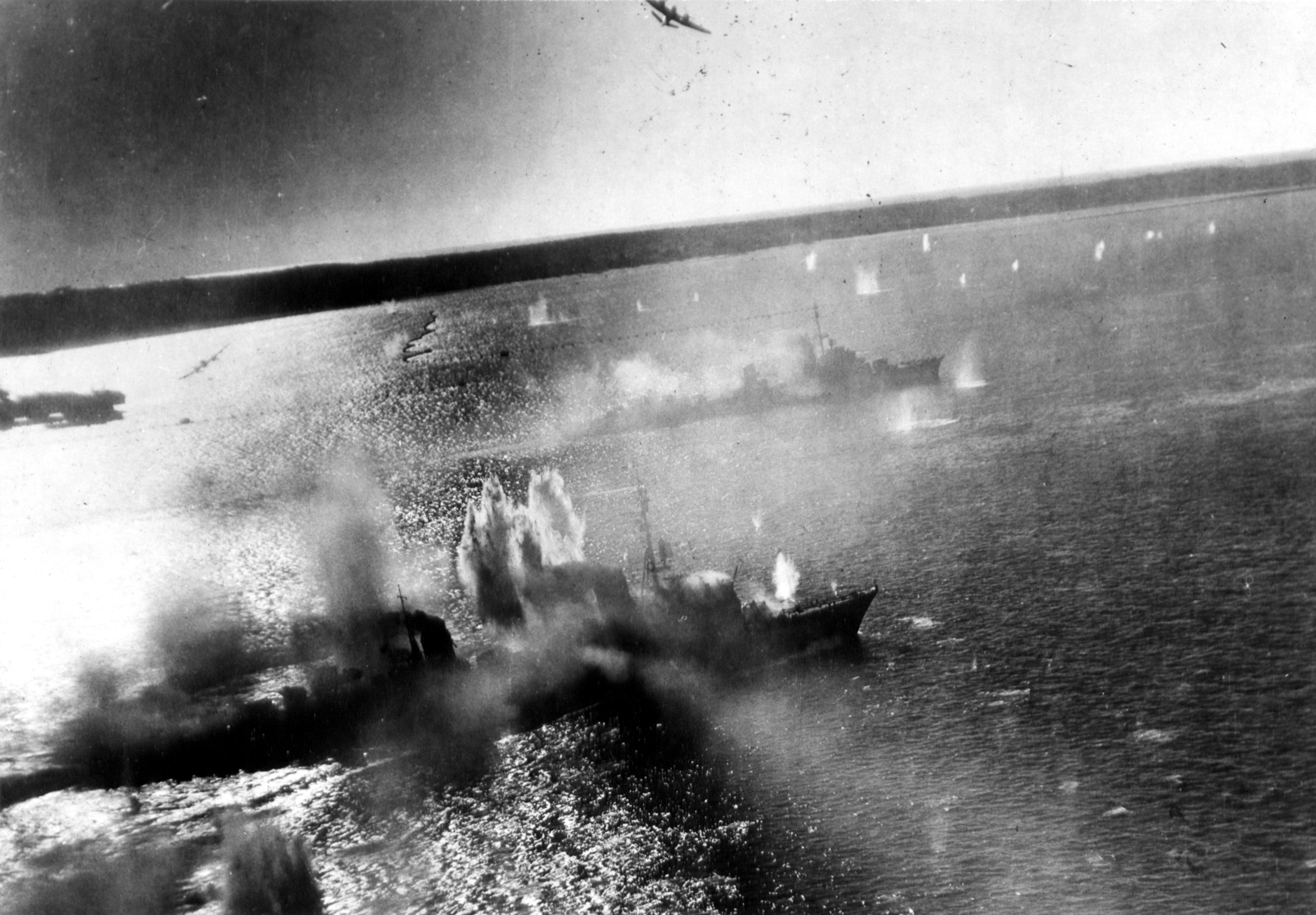
T24 (foreground) and Z24 under attack, 25 August

On the night of 21/22 July, T28 and three E-boats departed Le Havre for Germany, reaching their destination on the 27th, having evaded multiple Allied ships on their voyage. T24, two minesweepers and Sperrbrecher 157 were escorting the aircraft repair ship Richtofen when they were attacked on the night of 14/15 August by the light cruiser HMS Mauritius and the destroyers HMS Ursa and HMCS Iroquois off Les Sables d'Olonne. The torpedo boat laid a smoke screen and near-missed Iroquois with her torpedoes. She was hit once by Iroquois and Iroquois was lightly damaged during the attack. Off Le Verdon-sur-Mer on 24 August, T24 and Z24 were attacked by rocket-firing Bristol Beaufighter fighter-bombers that sank the torpedo boat and badly damaged the destroyer.

=== Activities in the Baltic 1943–1945 ===
While engaged in gunnery practice with the radio-controlled target ship Hessen in the Baltic on 20 November, T34 struck a mine and sank. T30 helped to lay minefields in the Gulf of Finland in April while attached to the 6th Destroyer Flotilla. Together with T31, she was tasked to support Finnish forces in Vyborg Bay and Koivisto Sound during the Vyborg–Petrozavodsk Offensive in June. They fought Soviet MTBs and claimed 3–5 boats sunk on 20 June, but T31 was sunk by a torpedo. While attempting to lay a minefield in the Gulf of Finland on the night of 17/18 August, T22, T30, and T32 accidentally entered a German minefield and were sunk. On 20–21 August, T23 and T28 helped to escort the heavy cruiser Prinz Eugen as she supported a German counterattack near Tukums, Latvia. As the Germans evacuated Tallinn, Estonia, in mid-September, the sisters helped to lay additional minefields in the Gulf of Finland to deny the Soviets access to the western portions of the gulf. On 22 October, T23 and T28 bombarded Soviet positions near Sworbe, on the Estonian island of Saaremaa, breaking up a Soviet attack. A month later, they provided support during a Soviet attack on 19 November, but the Germans were forced to evacuate several days later. T34 sank during gunnery training while still working up after hitting a mine on 20 November. The sisters were attached to the 6th Destroyer Flotilla to lay a minefield off the Estonian coast, but a navigation error caused two of the destroyers to blunder into a German minefield and sink on the night of 11/12 December.

Prinz Eugen, two destroyers, T23, T33 and T35 supported a German counterattack against advancing Soviet forces near Cranz, East Prussia, on 29–30 January 1945. T36 rescued more than 500 passengers from the torpedoed ocean liner MV Wilhelm Gustloff on the night of 30 January. All of the surviving Type 39s supporting German operations in East- and West Prussia until May. That month their mission became to evacuate as many refugees and troops as possible from those areas still in German hands. T36 was damaged by a mine during one such mission on 4 May and was sunk by Soviet aircraft the next day. They helped to rescue hundreds of thousands of people before Germany surrendered on 9 May.

=== Postwar service ===
Only four ships, T23, T28, T33 and T35, of the fifteen built survived the war. The Allies divided the surviving ships of the Kriegsmarine amongst themselves in late 1945 and the British were awarded the first pair, the Soviets received T33 and the Americans T35. After protests by France, the Royal Navy turned theirs over in February 1946, which the French renamed L'Alsacien and Le Lorrain. They both began lengthy overhauls that replaced their radars and 3.7 cm guns. The sisters were recommissioned in December 1949 and assigned to the Aircraft Carrier Group of the Mediterranean Squadron. They were later assigned to the Anti-submarine Group before they were condemned in 1954–1955 and subsequently sold for scrap. The Americans commissioned T35 as DD-935 and ran extensive trials with her before transferring the ship to France in 1947 for spare parts. T33 was taken over by a Soviet crew on 1 January 1946 and commissioned into the Soviet Navy four days later. Renamed Primerny on 13 February, she was assigned the North Baltic Fleet two days later. The ship was removed from combat duty and converted into a floating barracks on 30 November 1954 before being renamed PKZ-63 on 28 December. The vessel was transferred for scrapping on 9 November 1956.
