= German torpedo boat T36 =

Ship

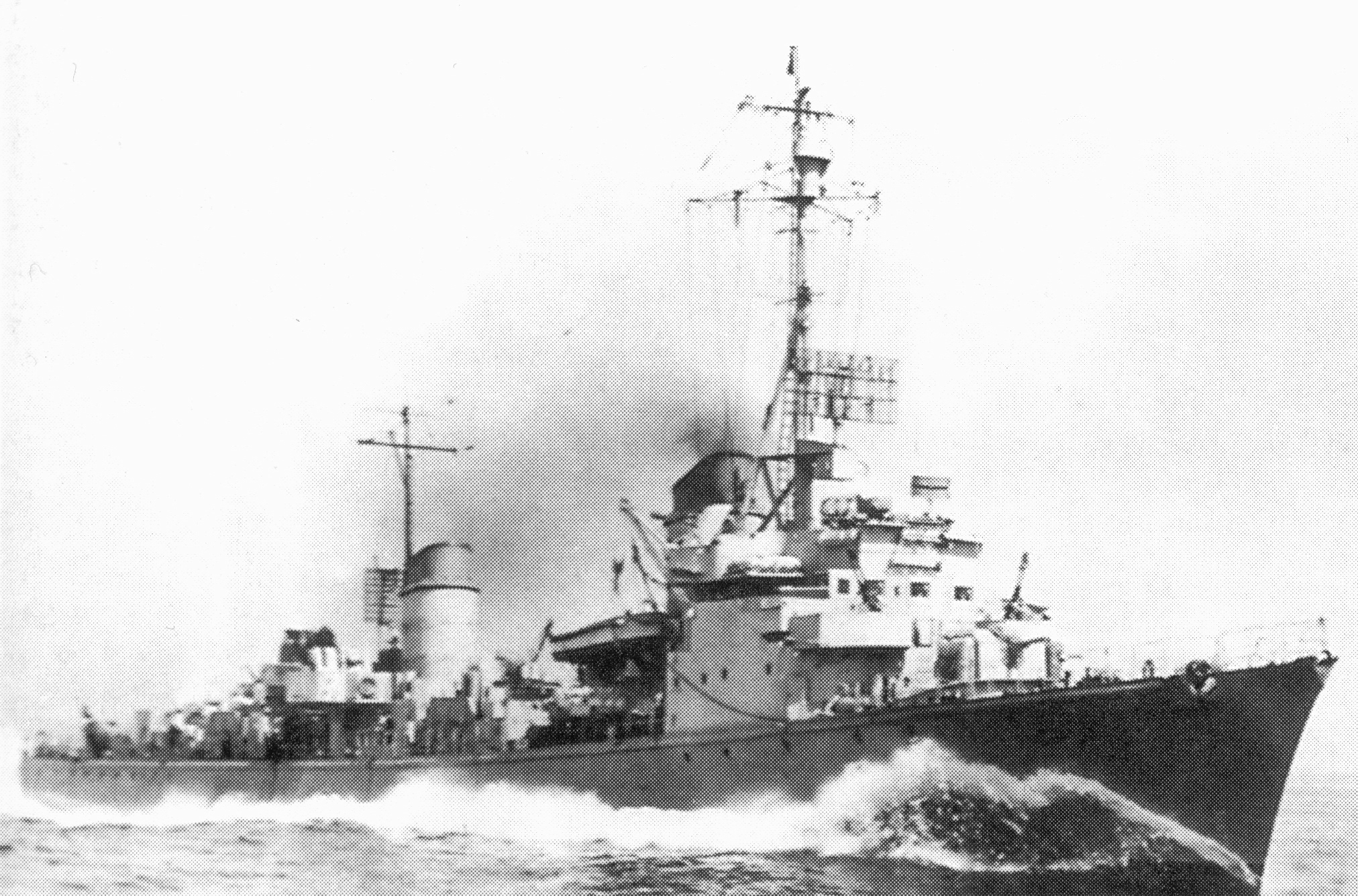
- Sister ship T35 in US service, August 1945

History

Nazi Germany
- Name: T36
- Ordered: 20 January 1941
- Builder: Schichau, Elbing, East Prussia
- Yard number: 1518
- Laid down: 10 June 1943
- Launched: 5 February 1944
- Completed: 9 December 1944
- Fate: Sunk by aircraft, 4 May 1945

General characteristics (as built)
- Class & type: Type 39 torpedo boat
- Displacement: 1,294 t (1,274 long tons) (standard); 1,754 t (1,726 long tons) (deep load)
- Length: 102.5 m (336 ft 3 in) o/a
- Beam: 10 m (32 ft 10 in)
- Draft: 3.22 m (10 ft 7 in)
- Installed power: 4 × water-tube boilers; 32,000 shp (24,000 kW)
- Propulsion: 2 × shafts; 2 × geared steam turbine sets
- Speed: 33.5 knots (62.0 km/h; 38.6 mph)
- Range: 2,400 nmi (4,400 km; 2,800 mi) at 19 knots (35 km/h; 22 mph)
- Complement: 206
- Sensors & processing systems: S-Gerät sonar; FuMO 21 radar
- Armament: 4 × single 10.5 cm (4.1 in) guns; 2 × twin 3.7 cm (1.5 in) AA guns; 3 × quadruple 2 cm (0.8 in) AA guns; 2 × triple 533 mm (21 in) torpedo tubes; 30–60 mines; 4 × depth charge launchers

The German torpedo boat T36 was the last of 15 Type 39 torpedo boats built for the Kriegsmarine (German Navy) during World War II. Completed in late 1944, T36 was assigned to convoy escort duties and supporting German forces in the Baltic. At the end of January 1945, she rescued survivors from the torpedoed ocean liner MV Wilhelm Gustloff. The boat screened German warships as they bombarded advancing Soviet troops and escorted convoys over the next several months. In May, T36 began to ferry refugees; she struck a mine on 4 May and was sunk by Soviet aircraft the following day.

== Design and description ==
The Type 39 torpedo boat was conceived as a general-purpose design, much larger than preceding German torpedo boats. The ships had an overall length of 102.5 meters (336 ft 3 in) and were 97 meters (318 ft 3 in) long at the waterline. They had a beam of 10 meters (32 ft 10 in), a draft of 3.22 meters (10 ft 7 in) at deep load and displaced 1,294 metric tons (1,274 long tons) at standard load and 1,754 metric tons (1,726 long tons) at deep load. Their crew numbered 206 officers and sailors. The Type 39s were fitted with a pair of geared steam turbine sets, each driving one shaft, using steam from four high-pressure water-tube boilers. The turbines were designed to produce 32,000 shaft horsepower (24,000 kW) which was intended give the ships a maximum speed of 33.5 knots (62.0 km/h; 38.6 mph). They carried enough fuel oil to give them a range of 2,400 nautical miles (4,400 km; 2,800 mi) at 19 knots (35 km/h; 22 mph).

As built, the Type 39 ships mounted four 10.5 cm (4.1 in) SK C/32 guns in single mounts protected by gun shields; one forward of the superstructure, one between the funnels, and two aft, one superfiring over the other. Anti-aircraft defense was provided by four 3.7 cm (1.5 in) SK C/30 AA guns in two twin-gun mounts on platforms abaft the rear funnel, and a dozen 2 cm (0.8 in) C/38 guns. One quadruple mount of the latter was positioned on the aft superstructure and two more were fitted on the bridge wings. They carried six above-water 533 mm (21 in) torpedo tubes in two triple mounts amidships and could also carry 30 mines; the full complement of 60 mines made the ships top-heavy which could be dangerous in bad weather. For anti-submarine work the boats were fitted with a S-Gerät sonar and four depth charge launchers. The Type 39s were equipped with a FuMO 21 radar (Note: Funkmess-Ortung (Radio-direction finder, active ranging)) and various FumB (Note: Funkmess-Beobachtung (Passive radar detector).) radar detectors were installed late in the war.

== Construction and career ==
T36 was ordered on 20 January 1941 from Schichau, laid down at their Elbing, East Prussia, shipyard on 10 June 1943 as yard number 1518, launched on 5 February 1944 and commissioned on 9 December 1944. After working up for the next several months, the boat was escorting the heavy cruiser Admiral Hipper on the night of 30 January 1945. They were supposed to rendezvous with an evacuation convoy that included Wilhelm Gustloff transporting refugees and troops from East Prussia in the face of the advancing Red Army (Operation Hannibal), but the liner was torpedoed by the Soviet submarine S-13. After depth-charging the submarine, T36 was able to pick up 564 survivors from the disaster and landed them at Sassnitz. A few days later the boat escorted the heavy cruiser Admiral Scheer, together with her sisters T23 and T35 off the East Prussian coast on 2–5 February. In early March T36 screened Admiral Scheer as they bombarded Soviet forces opposite Wollin Island. The boat screened evacuation convoys from Hela, East Prussia, to friendly territory in early April. She ferried 150 people from Hela to the West on 3 May. T36 returned to Hela and, laden with refugees, sailed for Copenhagen, Denmark, the following day. She struck a mine off Swinemünde later that day and was sunk the following day by Soviet aircraft.
