= German torpedo boat T32 =

German torpedo boat

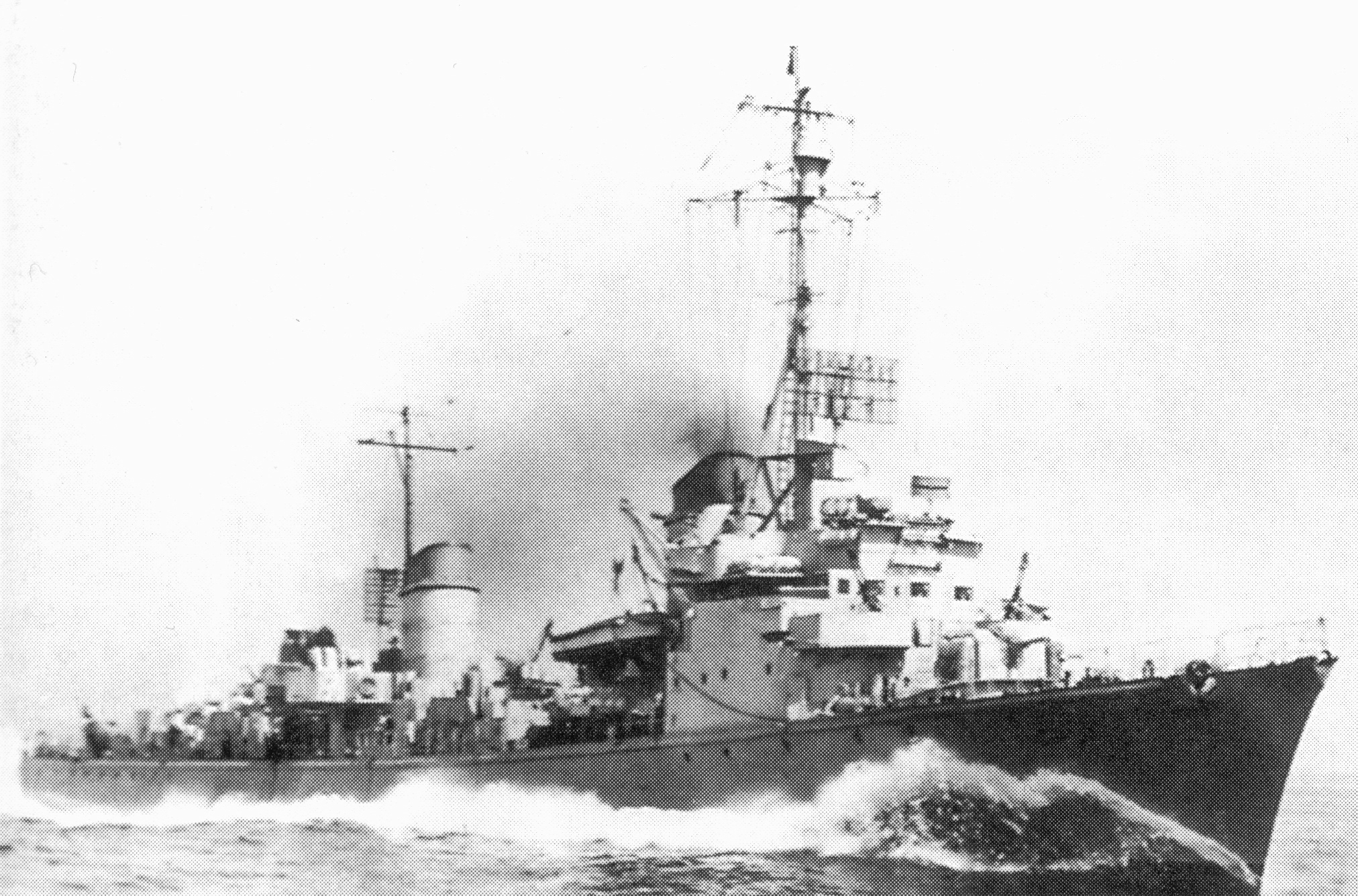
- Sister ship T35 in US service, August 1945

History

Nazi Germany
- Name: T32
- Ordered: 20 January 1941
- Builder: Schichau, Elbing, East Prussia
- Yard number: 1514
- Laid down: 28 October 1942
- Launched: 17 April 1943
- Completed: 8 May 1944
- Fate: Sunk by aircraft, 18 August 1944

General characteristics (as built)
- Class & type: Type 39 torpedo boat
- Displacement: 1,294 t (1,274 long tons) (standard); 1,754 t (1,726 long tons) (deep load)
- Length: 102.5 m (336 ft 3 in) o/a
- Beam: 10 m (32 ft 10 in)
- Draft: 3.22 m (10 ft 7 in)
- Installed power: 4 × water-tube boilers; 32,000 shp (24,000 kW)
- Propulsion: 2 × shafts; 2 × geared steam turbine sets
- Speed: 33.5 knots (62.0 km/h; 38.6 mph)
- Range: 2,400 nmi (4,400 km; 2,800 mi) at 19 knots (35 km/h; 22 mph)
- Complement: 206
- Sensors & processing systems: S-Gerät sonar; FuMO 21 radar
- Armament: 4 × single 10.5 cm (4.1 in) guns; 2 × twin 3.7 cm (1.5 in) AA guns; 3 × quadruple 2 cm (0.8 in) AA guns; 2 × triple 533 mm (21 in) torpedo tubes; 30–60 mines; 4 × depth charge launchers

The German torpedo boat T32 was one of fifteen Type 39 torpedo boats built for the Kriegsmarine (German Navy) during World War II. Completed in mid-1944, the boat was assigned to convoy escort duties and supporting German forces in the Baltic. On 18 August 1944, a navigational error led her to enter a German minefield as she was preparing to lay another minefield in the Gulf of Finland off the Estonian coast. T32 struck two mines that crippled her. She was sunk by Soviet aircraft with the loss of 137 crewmen later that morning.

== Design and description ==
The Type 39 torpedo boat was conceived as a general-purpose design, much larger than preceding German torpedo boats. The boats had an overall length of 102.5 meters (336 ft 3 in) and were 97 meters (318 ft 3 in) long at the waterline. They had a beam of 10 meters (32 ft 10 in), a draft of 3.22 meters (10 ft 7 in) at deep load and displaced 1,294 metric tons (1,274 long tons) at standard load and 1,754 metric tons (1,726 long tons) at deep load. Their crew numbered 206 officers and sailors. The Type 39s were fitted with a pair of geared steam turbine sets, each driving one propeller, using steam from four high-pressure water-tube boilers. The turbines were designed to produce 32,000 shaft horsepower (24,000 kW) which was intended give the ships a maximum speed of 33.5 knots (62.0 km/h; 38.6 mph). They carried enough fuel oil to give them a range of 2,400 nautical miles (4,400 km; 2,800 mi) at 19 knots (35 km/h; 22 mph).

As built, the Type 39 ships mounted four 10.5 cm (4.1 in) SK C/32 guns in single mounts protected by gun shields; one forward of the superstructure, one between the funnels, and two aft, one superfiring over the other. Anti-aircraft defense was provided by four 3.7 cm (1.5 in) SK C/30 AA guns in two twin-gun mounts on platforms abaft the rear funnel and a dozen 2 cm (0.8 in) C/38 guns. One quadruple mount was positioned on the aft superstructure and two more were fitted on the bridge wings. They carried six above-water 533 mm (21 in) torpedo tubes in two triple mounts amidships and could also carry 30 mines; the full complement of 60 mines made the ships top-heavy which could be dangerous in bad weather. For anti-submarine work the boats were fitted with a S-Gerät sonar and four depth charge launchers. The Type 39s were equipped with a FuMO 21 (Note: Funkmess-Ortung (Radio-direction finder, active ranging)) radar and various FumB (Note: Funkmess-Beobachtung (Passive radar detector).) radar detectors were installed late in the war.

== Construction and career ==
T32 was ordered on 20 January 1941 from Schichau, laid down at their Elbing, East Prussia, shipyard on 27 October 1942 as yard number 1514, launched on 17 April 1943 and commissioned on 8 May 1944. Working up until August, T32 was then assigned to the 6th Torpedo Boat Flotilla operating in the Baltic. The flotilla, consisting of T32 as the flotilla leader, and her sisters T22 and T30, was tasked to lay a minefield in Narva Bay on the night of 17/18 August. Reinforced by their sister T23 from the 5th Torpedo Boat Flotilla, the boats loaded 54 mines in Helsinki, Finland, and departed on the evening of the 17th. Shortly after midnight, they started to lay their mines, but had only just begun when T30 struck a pair of mines about 00:25 which knocked out her power and gave her a list to port. About a minute after that T32 also struck a pair of mines that blew her bow off and disabled her engines. At 00:30 T30 exploded and broke in half, probably after hitting another mine. T22 struck a pair of mines while maneuvering to go alongside T32 and blew up at around 01:14. The Germans thought that she had been torpedoed by the Soviet motor torpedo boats that they believed were present and T23's captain ordered his boat to leave the area without rescuing any of the survivors in the water or aboard T32. The ship was sunk by Soviet aircraft after dawn at 59°42′N 27°43′E with the loss of 137 crewmen after T23's departure. The Soviets never claimed to have torpedoed any of the boats that night and naval historian Michael J. Whitley believes that the most likely explanation is that they accidentally entered a nearby German minefield, either through their own errors in navigation or because the minefield was misplotted when laid.
