= FuMO 21 radar =

Nazi Germany search radar

FuMO 21
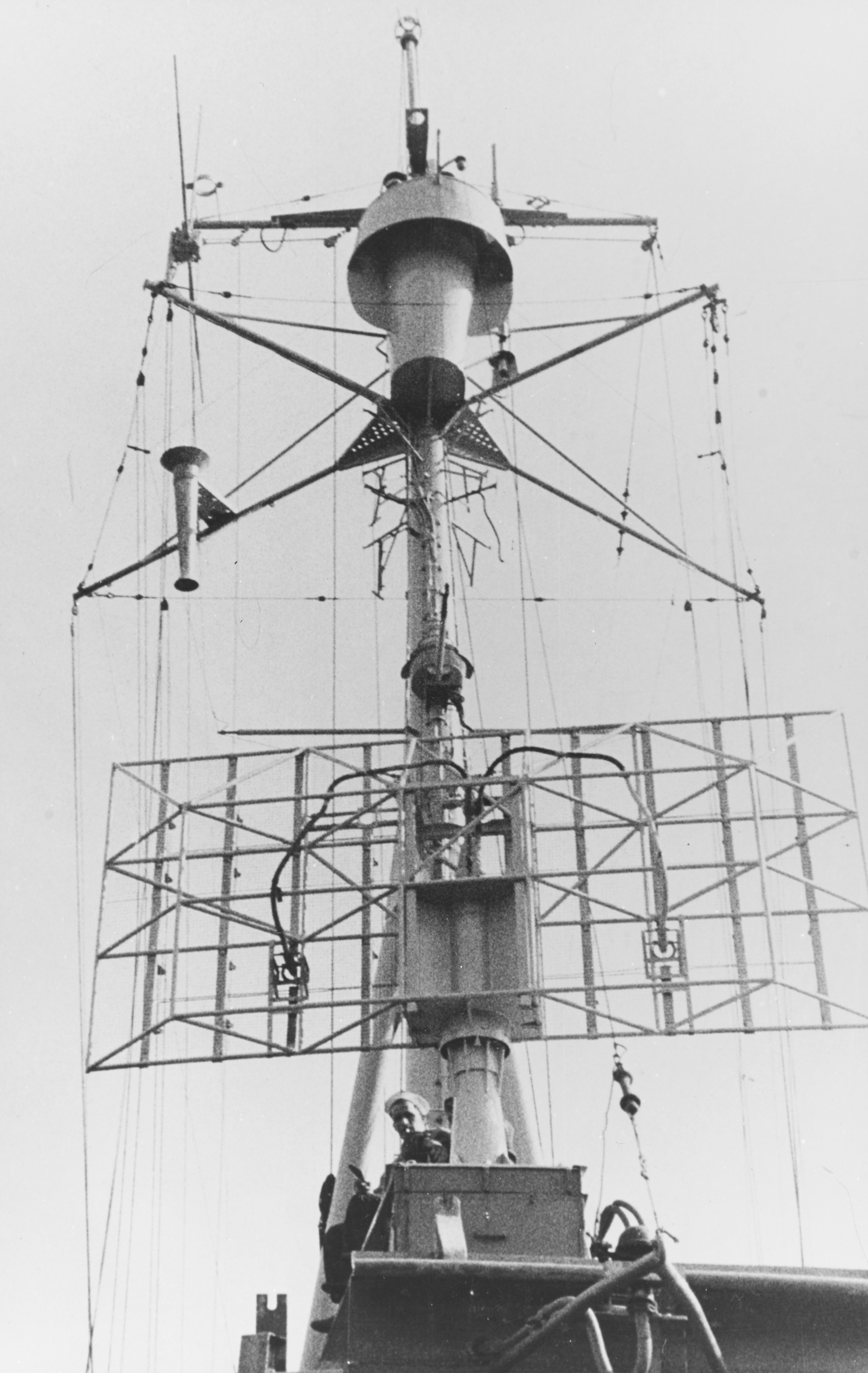
- The rectangular antenna of the FuMO 21 of the ex-German torpedo boat T35
- Country of origin: Nazi Germany
- Introduced: 1941
- Type: Search radar
- Frequency: 368 MHz/81.5 cm
- PRF: 500 per second
- Pulsewidth: 5 μs
- Range: about 10 nmi (19 km; 12 mi)
- Precision: ±70 m (230 ft)
- Power: 8 kW

The FuMO 21 (Funkmess-Ortung, "Radio-direction finder, active ranging") was designed in 1941 as a search radar for Nazi Germany's Kriegsmarine, suitable for ships between light cruiser and large torpedo boats in size. First designated FMG (Note: Funkmess-Gerät (Radio-direction finding device)) 39G(gL), it received its final designation when the Kriegsmarine revised its radar nomenclature system around 1943. It was derived from the earlier Seetakt search radar and had an antenna 2 m × 4 m (6 ft 7 in × 13 ft 1 in) in size.

== Bibliography ==
- Friedman, Norman (1981). Naval Radar. London: Conway Maritime Press. ISBN 0-85177-238-2.
- Sieche, Erwin (1982). "German Naval Radar". In Roberts, John (ed.). Warship VI. London: Conway Maritime Press. pp. 2–10, 146–153. ISBN 0-87021-981-2.
