= German torpedo boat T35 =

German torpedo boat

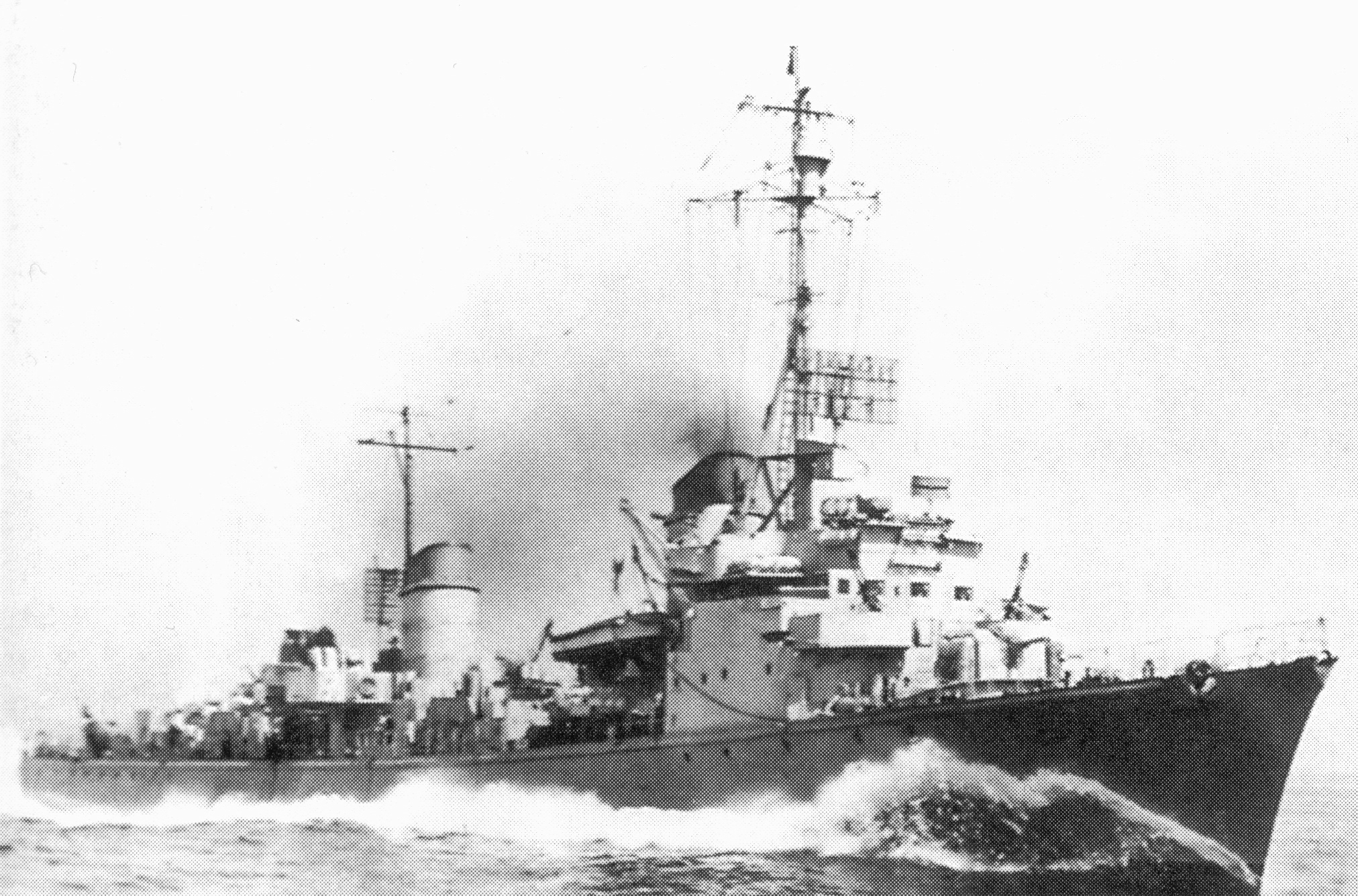
- T35 in US service, August 1945

History

Nazi Germany
- Name: T35
- Ordered: 20 January 1941
- Builder: Schichau, Elbing, East Prussia
- Yard number: 1517
- Laid down: 20 April 1943
- Launched: 12 December 1943
- Completed: 7 October 1944
- Fate: Transferred as war reparations, 1946

United States
- Name: T35
- Renamed: DD-935
- Fate: Transferred to France, 1947; stricken 3 October 1952

General characteristics (as built)
- Class & type: Type 39 torpedo boat
- Displacement: 1,294 t (1,274 long tons) (standard); 1,754 t (1,726 long tons) (deep load)
- Length: 102.5 m (336 ft 3 in) o/a
- Beam: 10 m (32 ft 10 in)
- Draft: 3.22 m (10 ft 7 in)
- Installed power: 4 × water-tube boilers; 32,000 shp (24,000 kW)
- Propulsion: 2 × shafts; 2 × geared steam turbine sets
- Speed: 33.5 knots (62.0 km/h; 38.6 mph)
- Range: 2,400 nmi (4,400 km; 2,800 mi) at 19 knots (35 km/h; 22 mph)
- Complement: 206
- Sensors & processing systems: S-Gerät sonar; FuMO 21 radar
- Armament: 4 × single 10.5 cm (4.1 in) guns; 2 × twin, 2 × single 3.7 cm (1.5 in) AA guns; 1 × quadruple, 2 × twin 2 cm (0.8 in) AA guns; 2 × triple 533 mm (21 in) torpedo tubes; 30–60 mines; 4 × depth charge launchers

The German torpedo boat T35 was one of fifteen Type 39 torpedo boats built for the Kriegsmarine (German Navy) during World War II. Completed in late 1944, she was assigned to convoy escort duties and supporting German forces in the Baltic. The ship escorted a heavy cruiser in January 1945 as she bombarded Soviet troops and helped to evacuate troops and refugees from advancing Soviet forces in May. T35 was allocated to the United States after the war, but was turned over to the French Navy in 1947 to be used as a source of spare parts. She was stricken from the Navy List in 1952 and subsequently sold for scrap.

== Design and description ==
The Type 39 torpedo boat was conceived as a general-purpose design, much larger than preceding German torpedo boats. The boats had an overall length of 102.5 meters (336 ft 3 in) and were 97 meters (318 ft 3 in) long at the waterline. They had a beam of 10 meters (32 ft 10 in), a draft of 3.22 meters (10 ft 7 in) at deep load and displaced 1,294 metric tons (1,274 long tons) at standard load and 1,754 metric tons (1,726 long tons) at deep load. Their crew numbered 206 officers and sailors. The Type 39s were fitted with a pair of geared steam turbine sets, each driving one shaft, using steam from four high-pressure water-tube boilers. The turbines were designed to produce 32,000 shaft horsepower (24,000 kW) which was intended give the ships a maximum speed of 33.5 knots (62.0 km/h; 38.6 mph). They carried enough fuel oil to give them a range of 2,400 nautical miles (4,400 km; 2,800 mi) at 19 knots (35 km/h; 22 mph).

At war's end T-35 mounted four 10.5 cm (4.1 in) SK C/32 guns in single mounts protected by gun shields; one forward of the superstructure, one between the funnels, and two aft, one superfiring over the other. Anti-aircraft defense was provided by four 3.7 cm (1.5 in) AA guns of unknown types in two twin-gun mounts on platforms abaft the rear funnel and two shielded single-gun mounts on the bridge wings, together with eight 2 cm (0.8 in) C/38 guns. One quadruple mount was positioned on the aft superstructure and two twin-gun mounts were fitted on platforms in front of the bridge. The torpedo boat carried six above-water 533 mm (21 in) torpedo tubes in two triple mounts amidships and could also carry 30 mines; the full complement of 60 mines made the ships top-heavy which could be dangerous in bad weather. For anti-submarine work she was fitted with a S-Gerät sonar and four depth charge launchers. By the end of the war, T-35 was equipped with a FuMO 21 radar (Note: Funkmess-Ortung (Radio-direction finder, active ranging)) on the foremast, a FuMO 63 K Hohentwiel radar on the searchlight platform and various FumB (Note: Funkmess-Beobachtung (Passive radar detector).) radar detectors.

== Construction and career ==
T35 was ordered on 20 January 1941 from Schichau, laid down at their Elbing, East Prussia, shipyard on 20 April 1943 as yard number 1517, launched on 12 December 1943 and commissioned on 7 October 1944. After working up for the next several months, the boat was one of the escorts for the heavy cruiser Prinz Eugen as the latter ship supported a German counterattack against advancing Soviet forces near Cranz, East Prussia, on 29–30 January 1945. On 5 May, T35 helped to ferry 45,000 refugees from East Prussia to Copenhagen, Denmark, and returned to transport 20,000 more to Glücksburg, Germany, on the 9th. The boat was allocated to the United States when the Allies divided the surviving ships of the Kriegsmarine amongst themselves in late 1945. T35 was taken to the United States for testing and renamed DD-935. She was towed to France in 1947 where she was cannibalized for spare parts. The ship was stricken from the Navy List on 3 October 1952 and subsequently scrapped.
