= Zelenogradsk =

Town in Kaliningrad Oblast, Russia

Zelenogradsk Зеленоградск
- Town
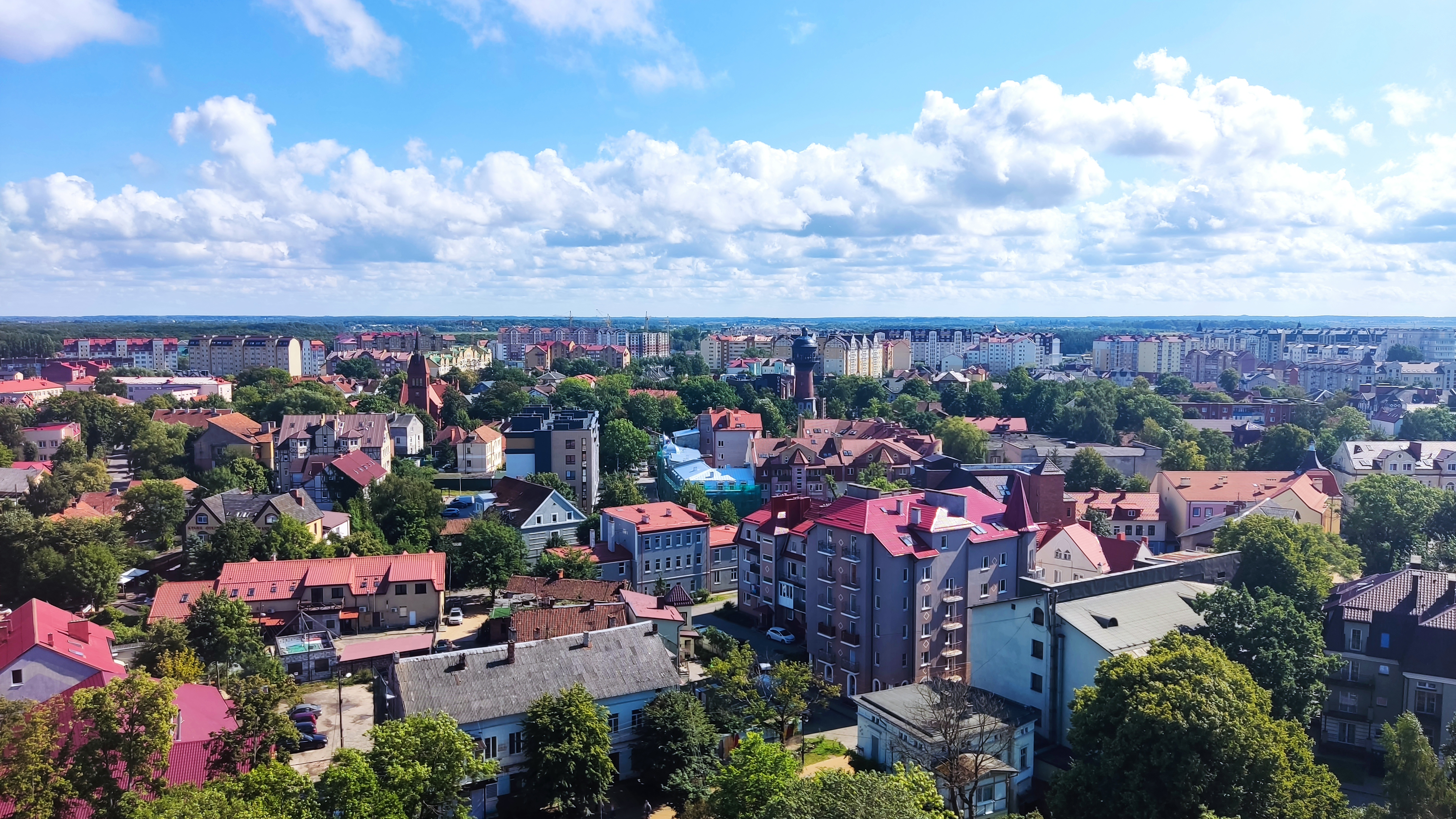
- View of Zelenogradsk

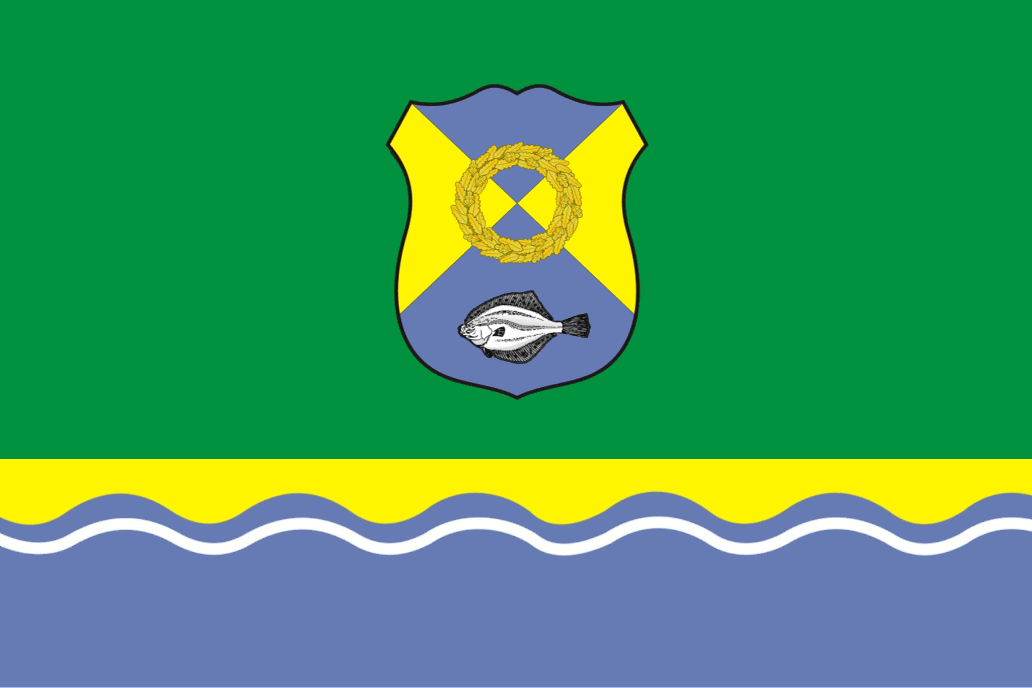
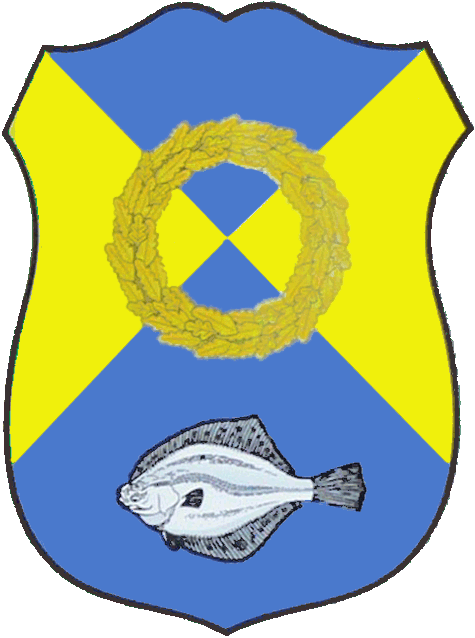
- Flag Coat of arms
- Interactive map of Zelenogradsk
- Location of Zelenogradsk Zelenogradsk (European Russia) Zelenogradsk (Europe)
- Coordinates: 54°58′N 20°29′E
- Country: Russia
- Federal subject: Kaliningrad Oblast
- Administrative district: Zelenogradsky District
- Town of district significanceSelsoviet: Zelenogradsk
- Founded: 1252
- Elevation: 3 m (9.8 ft)

Population (2010 Census)
  - Total: 13,026
  - Estimate (2025): 17,085 (+31.2%)

Administrative status
  - Capital of: Zelenogradsky District, town of district significance of Zelenogradsk

Municipal status
  - Urban okrug: Zelenogradsky Urban Okrug
  - Capital of: Zelenogradsky Urban Okrug
- Time zone: UTC+2 (MSK–1)
- Postal codes: 238326, 238530
- OKTMO ID: 27510000001

Zelenogradsk (Russian: Зеленогра́дск IPA: [zʲɪlʲɪnɐˈgratsk]), prior to 1946 known by its German name Cranz (Lithuanian and Old Prussian: Krantas), is a town and the administrative center of Zelenogradsky District in Kaliningrad Oblast, Russia, located 34 kilometers (21 mi) north of Kaliningrad, on the Sambian coastline near the Curonian Spit on the Baltic Sea. Population: 17,296 (2021 census); 13,026 (2010 census); 12,509 (2002 census); 10,786 (1989 Soviet census).

In its heyday, Zelenogradsk (as Cranz) was a popular seaside resort on Germany's eastern Baltic coast, comparable to Bognor Regis in England. However, at the end of World War II, the Soviets took over the town, and much of its tourist traffic has been diverted to nearby Svetlogorsk.

== History ==
The site of today's Zelenogradsk was originally an Old Prussian fishing village, in the proximity of Kaup, a Prussian town on the coast of the Baltic Sea in the Viking era. The area became controlled by the Teutonic Order and settled with Germans. The German name Cranz, originally Cranzkuhren, derives from the Old Prussian word krantas, meaning "the coast". For most of its history, it remained a small village.

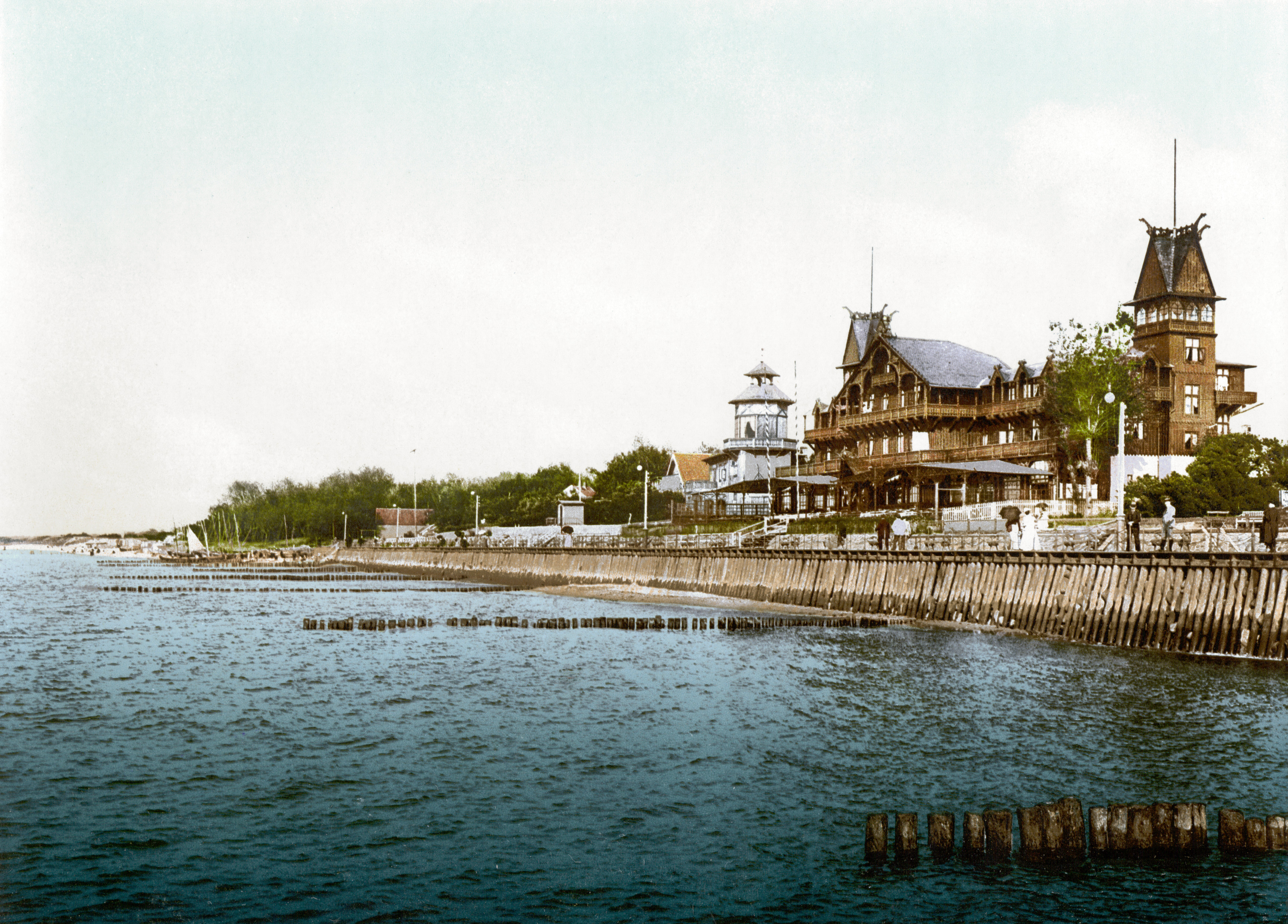
1890–1905 postcard of Cranz with the Ladies Bath

From the 18th century it formed part of the Kingdom of Prussia, in 1758–1762 it was under Russian control, and from 1871 it was also part of Germany, within which it was administratively located in the province of East Prussia. During the 19th century, Cranz became the primary seaside resort for the Kingdom of Prussia on the East Prussian coastline, especially after the construction of a railway line connecting it with Königsberg (now Kaliningrad) in 1885. From 1816 to 1895, it was known as das königliche Bad, or "the royal bathing resort". In the late 19th century, the settlement was inhabited by more than 1,000 people, mainly living off tourism, however, the fishing industry remained strong. There was trade in flounder and salmon; smoked flounder was a regional delicacy. Two annual fairs were held, usually in July and August. Although Cranz had over 6,000 inhabitants by the start of World War II, it has not yet received a town charter.

The area was overrun by the Soviet Red Army during World War II and annexed to the Russian SFSR, although it suffered minimally through warfare. The German population fled during the evacuation of East Prussia or was subsequently expelled in accordance with the Potsdam Agreement. Cranz was renamed Zelenogradsk in 1946 and was granted town status in the subsequent years.

In 2015, a monument of poet Adam Mickiewicz was erected in the town to commemorate his visit in 1824.

== Administrative and municipal status ==
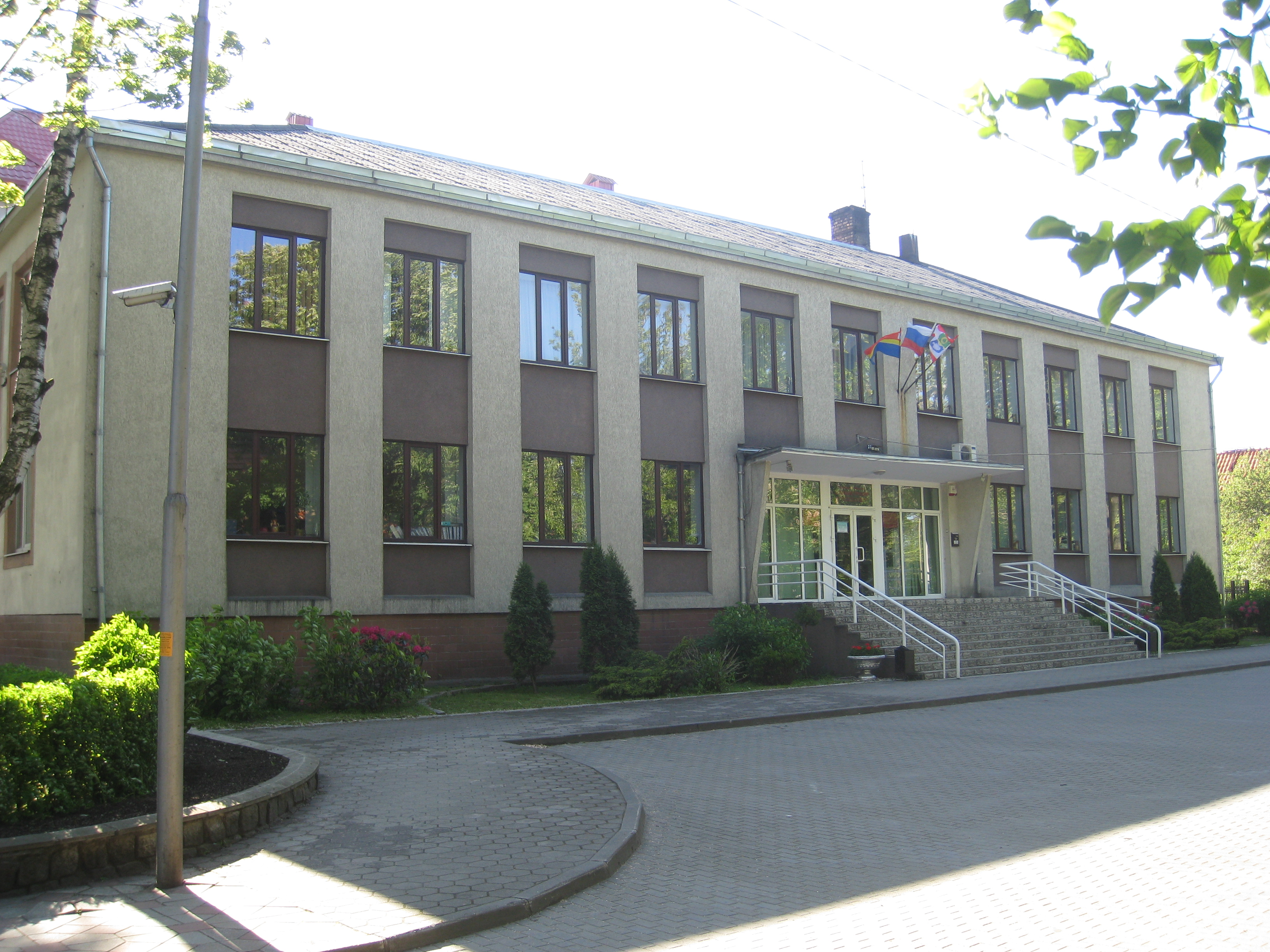
Administration building

Within the framework of administrative divisions, Zelenogradsk serves as the administrative center of Zelenogradsky District. As an administrative division, it is incorporated within Zelenogradsky District as the town of district significance of Zelenogradsk.

Within the framework of municipal divisions, since May 15, 2015, the territories of the town of district significance of Zelenogradsk and of four rural okrugs of Zelenogradsky District are incorporated as Zelenogradsky Urban Okrug. Before that, the town of district significance was incorporated within Zelenogradsky Municipal District as Zelenogradskoye Urban Settlement.

== Tourism ==
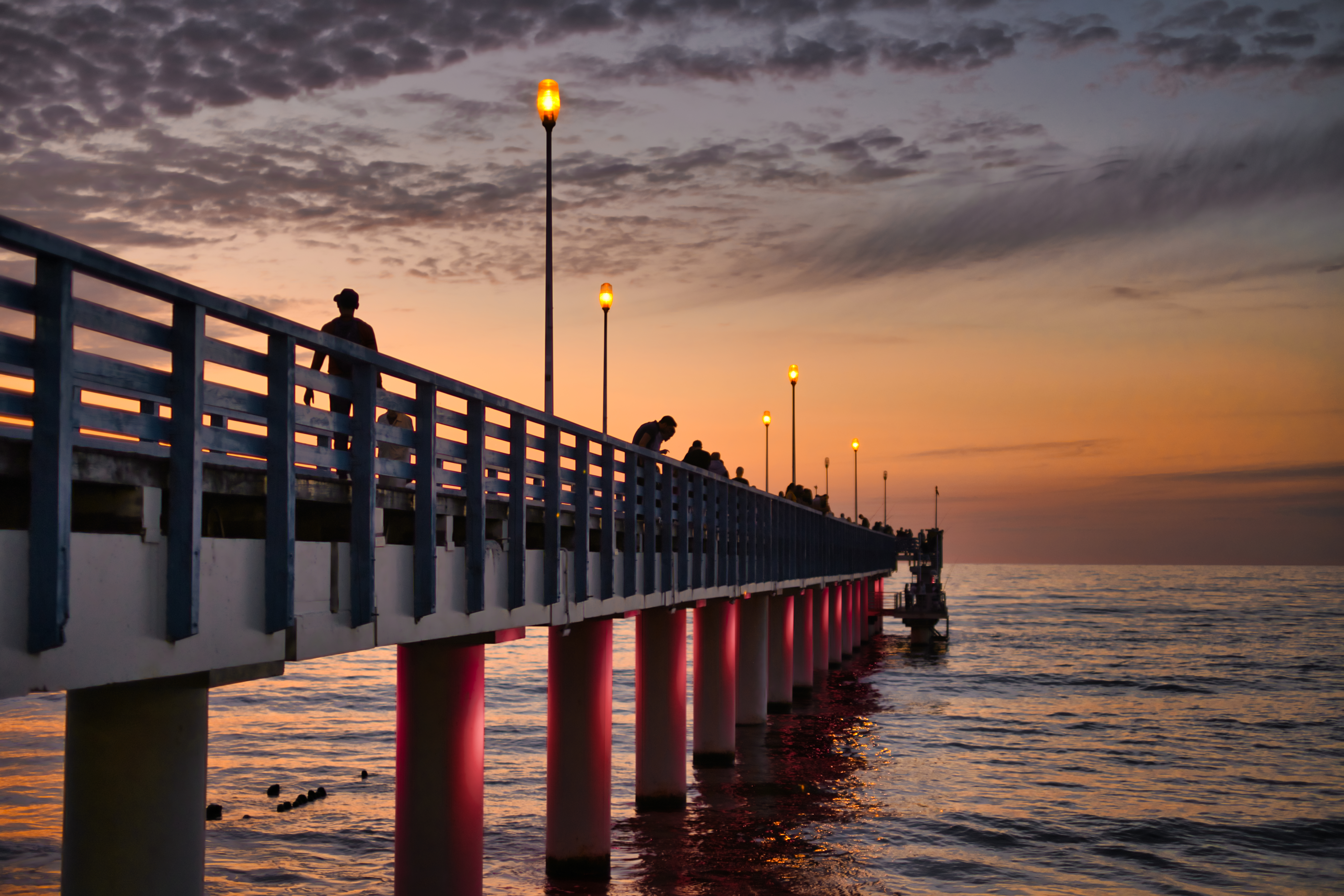
Pier

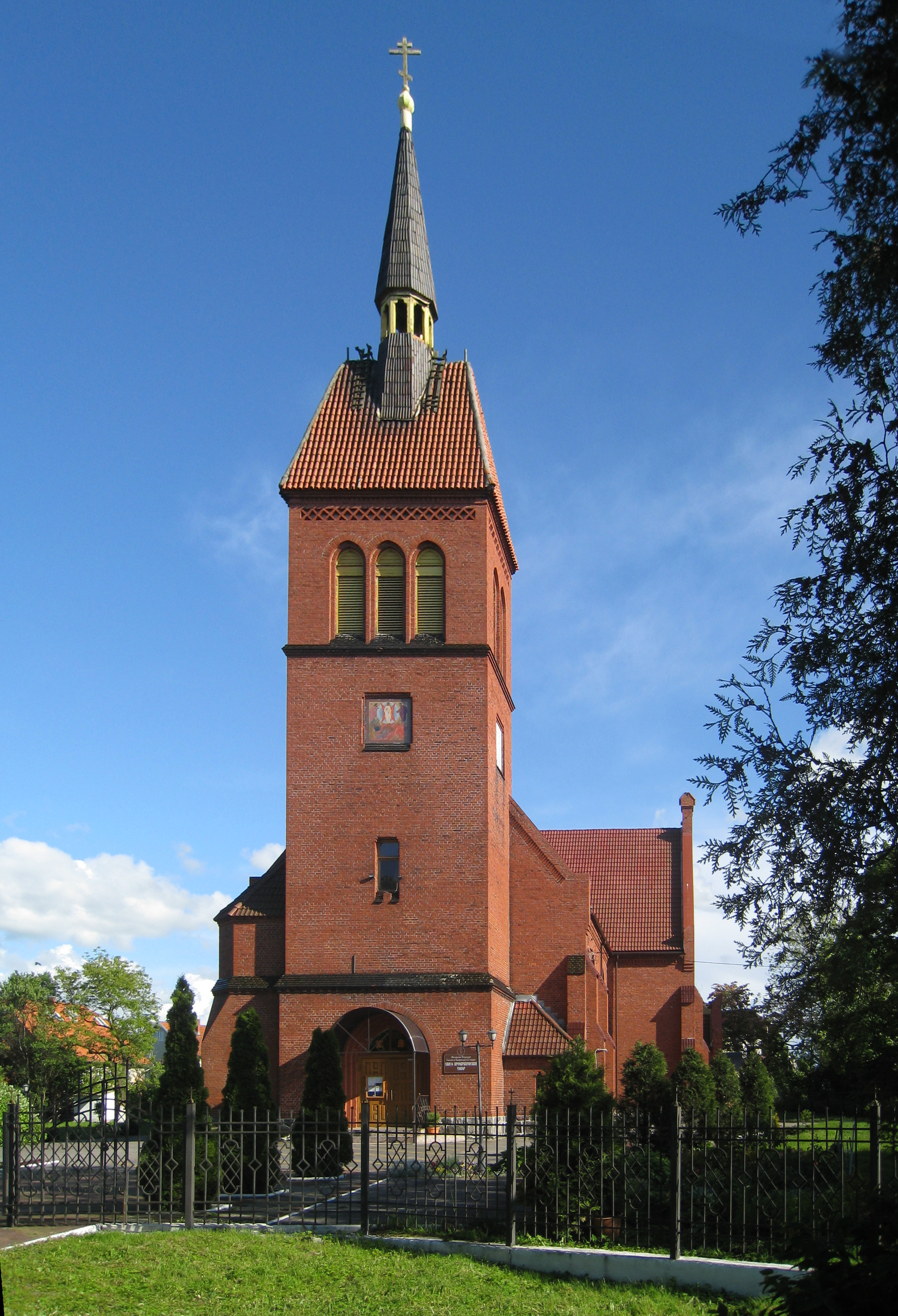
Transfiguration Church

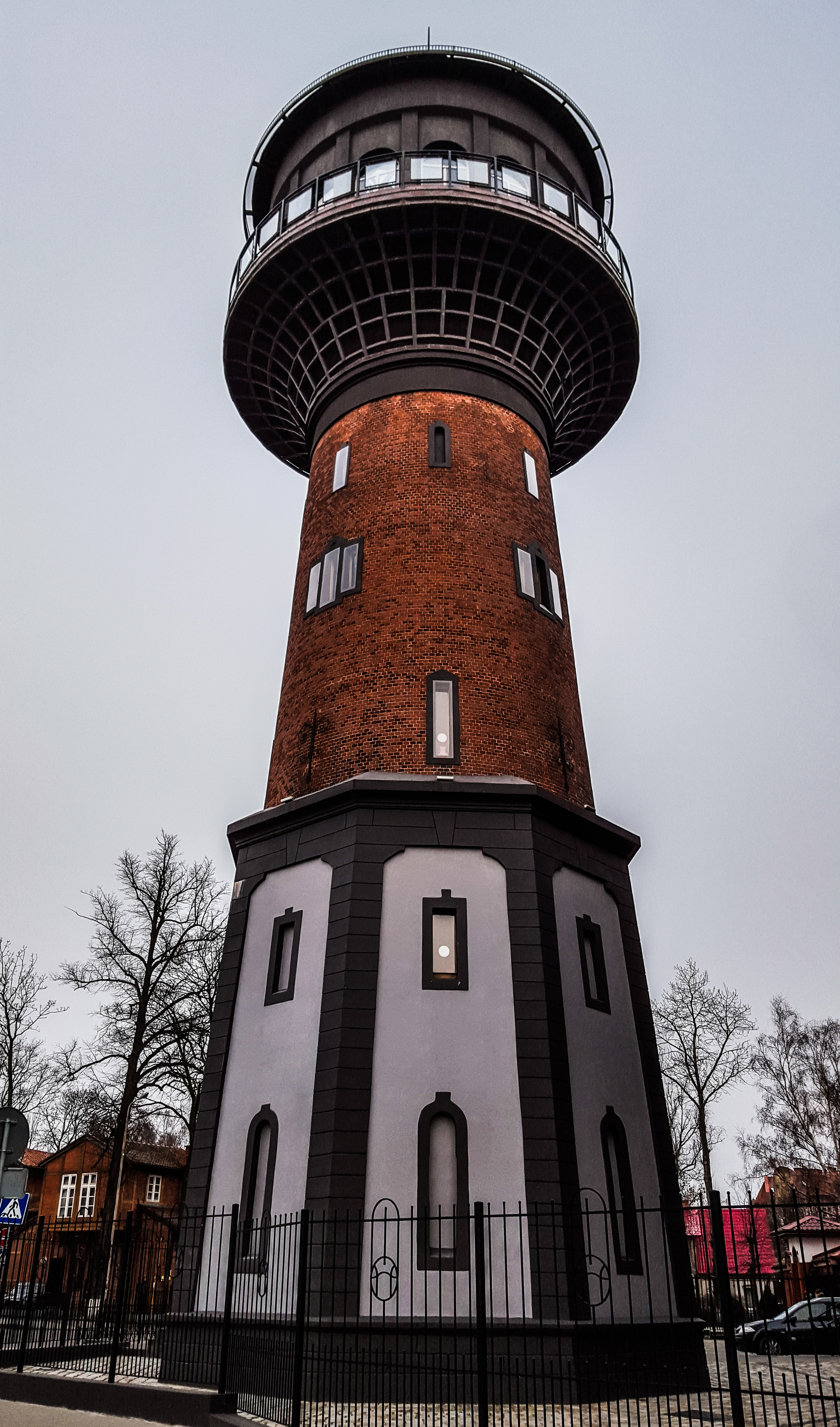
Water tower

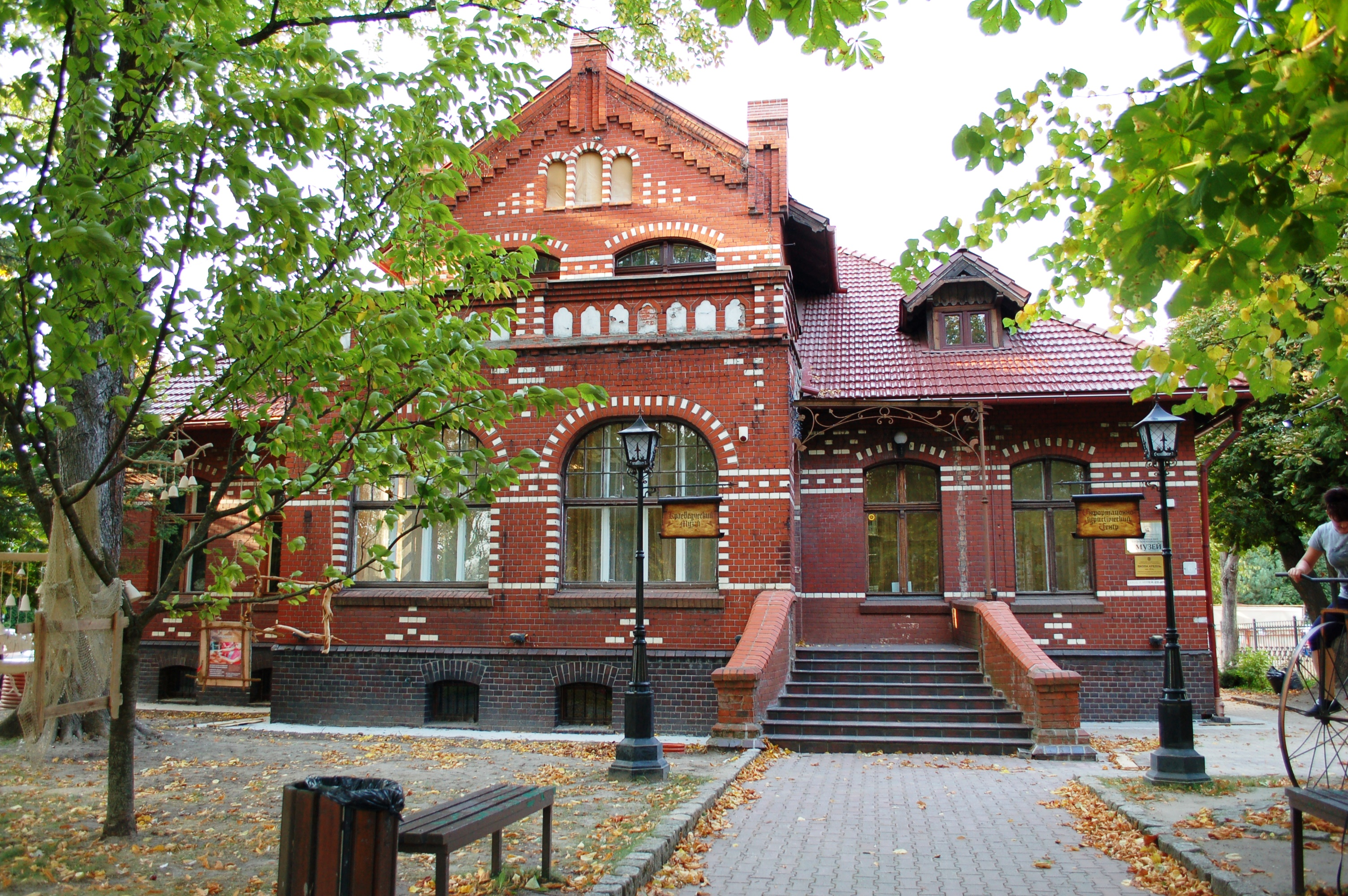
Museum

The tourism industry was neglected during the Cold War and Zelenogradsk's tourism primacy was relinquished to nearby Svetlogorsk.

== Notable people ==
- Adolf Tortilowicz von Batocki-Friebe (1868–1944), politician
- Abel Ehrlich (1915–2003), composer
- Volker Lechtenbrink (1944-2021), actor
- Beate Uhse-Rotermund (1919–2001), aviator and entrepreneur
- Mary Saran (1897–1976), journalist

== Twin towns and sister cities ==
Zelenogradsk is twinned with:

- Łeba, Poland
- Borgholm, Sweden

Former twin towns:

- Braniewo, Poland

In March 2022, the Polish city of Braniewo terminated its partnership with Zelenogradsk as a reaction to the 2022 Russian invasion of Ukraine.
