= Darkness Fell on Gotenhafen =

1959 film directed by Frank Wisbar

Nacht fiel über Gotenhafen
- Directed by: Frank Wisbar
- Written by: Frank Wisbar; Victor Schuller
- Produced by: Otto Meissner; Alf Teichs)
- Starring: Sonja Ziemann; Gunnar Möller
- Cinematography: Willi Winterstein
- Music by: Hans-Martin Majewski
- Production company: Deutsche Film Hansa
- Distributed by: Deutsche Film Hansa
- Release date: 25 February 1960
- Running time: 99 minutes
- Country: West Germany
- Language: German

Darkness Fell on Gotenhafen (German: Nacht fiel über Gotenhafen) is a 1960 German war drama film, directed by Frank Wisbar. It dramatizes the sinking of MV Wilhelm Gustloff, which was sunk while carrying German servicemen and around 6,000 civilian evacuees. Heinz Schön presents the combined death toll as 9,343.

== Sinking of MV Wilhelm Gustloff ==
MV Wilhelm Gustloff was a German cruise liner laid down on 4 August 1936. Intended to be christened Adolf Hitler, she was eventually named after Wilhelm Gustloff, the assassinated leader of Nazi Party Foreign Organisation in Switzerland. She was launched into the Elbe on 5 May 1937.

The liner was constructed by Blohm & Voss, Hamburg as part of the Kraft durch Freude (Strength through Joy) program to endorse low-cost voyages for the German working class, with the belief that happy workers work harder. Up to 30 luxury liners had been planned, but only two were ever built. Wilhelm Gustloff was the flagship, and Robert Ley was her sister ship.

At the outbreak of the war in September, 1939, the ship's original purpose came to an end. She was requisitioned by the Kriegsmarine and converted to a hospital ship until 20 November 1940 with the designation Lazarettschiff D (Hospital Ship D), but was often referred to as Lazarettschiff "Wilhelm Gustloff" (Hospital Ship "Wilhelm Gustloff").

After that, she became a floating barracks (accommodation ship) for around 1,000 men of the 2nd U-boat Training Division in the port of Gotenhafen (now Gdynia). Wilhelm Gustloff was moored there for more than four years until 1945 before she was put back into service as part of Operation Hannibal.

Commenced on 23 January 1945, Operation Hannibal was a German naval action under the initiative of Grand Admiral Karl Doenitz to evacuate German civilians and military personnel from the Baltic (Courland, East Prussia, and Polish Corridor) as the Soviet Red Army advanced. Doenitz asserted that the operation was to evacuate as many lives as possible away from the already-begun Soviet reprisals. Ships of all kinds took part in this massive rescue operation, which ceased in May 1945 as the war ended.

At 1230 hours on 30 January 1945, Wilhelm Gustloff left Gotenhafen for Kiel. By 1500 hours she had reached the open sea. It was snowing, with a temperature of −20 °C (−4 °F) and strong wind of 30 knots (56 km/h; 35 mph). According to the ship's official records, 6,000 to 7,000 people were registered. In fact, more than 10,500 people were on board, exceeding her designed capacity by about 8,650. The ship was 'Noah's Ark' for those escaping the advancing Soviet Red Army.

At 2108 hours, only about 30 kilometres (16 nmi) after her departure, she was torpedoed by the Soviet submarine S-13, commanded by Captain Aleksandr Marinesko. Before sinking Wilhelm Gustloff, Marinesko was facing a court martial for drunkenness. Four torpedoes were prepared and each had one nickname: 'For Motherland', 'For Leningrad', 'For the Soviet People', and 'For Stalin'. The first three were launched successfully and struck the port side of the ship.

After being struck, the ship listed rapidly to port. Within an hour, she sank 45 metres (148 ft) beneath the Baltic Sea. As many as 9,343 lives were lost. This remains the highest death toll of any ship sinking in history and is dubbed "the German Titanic." The number of casualties is six times greater than that of Titanic. 1,215 survivors were picked up by eight German ships that came to the rescue. S-13 launched two torpedoes at one of them without scoring any hits.

On 10 February 1945, S-13 sank another evacuation ship SS Steuben that was carrying about 5,000 people where only 650 survived.

In the end, only about 10 percent of the passengers survived, because many of the lifeboats were unusable, and the crew essential for lowering them were either trapped or dead following the first torpedo impact. Additionally, overcrowding that led to chaos trapped many passengers below decks, and the freezing waters of the Baltic Sea diminished the chance of survival for the floating survivors.

== Cast ==
- Sonja Ziemann as Maria Reiser
- Gunnar Möller as Kurt Reiser
- Erik Schumann as Hans Schott
- Brigitte Horney as Generalin von Reuss
- Mady Rahl as Edith Marquardt
- Erich Dunskus as Father Marquardt
- Willy Maertens as Father Reiser
- Edith Schultze-Westrum as Mutter Reiser
- Wolfgang Preiss as Dr. Beck
- Tatjana Iwanow as Servicewoman Meta
- Christine Mylius as Mrs Rauh
- Aranka Jaenke as Mrs Kahle
- Dietmar Schönherr as Gaston
- Günter Pfitzmann as Oberleutnant Dankel
- Erwin Linder as Kapitänleutnant
- Günter Ungeheuer as Doctor
- Karl-Heinz Kreienbaum as Radioman of the Gustloff
- Carl Lange as Captain Zahn
- Peter Voß as Captain Petersen
- Carla Hagen as Monica
- Til Kiwe as SS officer
- Georg Lehn as Mr Pinkoweit
- Hela Gruel as Mrs Pinkoweit
- Thomas Braut as Lieutenant von Fritzen
- Wolfgang Stumpf as Reese, First Officer of the Gustloff
- Ursula Herwig as Inge
- Marlene Riphahn as Mrs Kubelsky
- Martin Hirthe as Party guest
- Horst Frank as Narrator
