= Aleksandr Oryol =

Soviet naval officer

Aleksandr Yevstafyevich Oryol
- Born: 25 August 1908; Saint Petersburg, Russian Empire
- Died: 20 June 1997 (aged 88) Saint Petersburg, Russia
- Buried: Serafimovskoe Cemetery
- Allegiance: Soviet Union
- Branch: Soviet Navy
- Service years: 1929-1987
- Rank: Admiral
- Commands: Baltic Fleet; Naval Academy
- Conflicts: Winter War; Second World War
- Awards: Order of Zhukov; Order of Lenin (twice); Order of the October Revolution; Order of the Red Banner (four times); Order of Ushakov Second Class; Order of the Patriotic War First Class (twice); Order of the Red Star (three times); Order of the Red Banner of Labour

Aleksandr Yevstafyevich Oryol (Russian: Александр Евстафьевич Орёл; 25 August 1908 – 20 June 1997) was an officer of the Soviet Navy. He served during the Winter War and the Second World War and reached the rank of admiral.

Born in the Russian Empire in 1908, Oryol had started his career on the water by 1924 aboard river-going merchant vessels, before joining the Red Navy in 1929. After studies and training in naval schools, he served aboard submarines in the Black Sea and Baltic Fleets, rising to command his own submarine by 1937. He then became commander of the Baltic Fleet's 21st Submarine Division, and saw action following the outbreak of the Winter War with Finland in 1939. He was still with the Baltic Fleet when the Axis invasion of the Soviet Union began in June 1941, soon being appointed deputy commander of the Baltic Fleet's submarine brigade. After various staff and headquarters postings, in May 1943, became commander of the 1st Submarine Division, the post he would hold for the rest of the war.

After the war, Oryol was appointed as a technical expert to the Soviet representative office to the Tripartite Naval Commission. Various submarine staff and command positions followed, serving in both the Baltic and Northern Fleets. In May 1955, Oryol became a deputy Commander-in-Chief of the Navy, and head of the Naval General Staff's submarine department, followed by commander of the Northern Fleet's submarine forces. He played an important role in the introduction of nuclear submarines into the navy. In 1959, he was appointed commander of the Baltic Fleet, and in 1967 left the Baltic Fleet to take up the position of head of the Naval Academy. He stepped down in 1974, and became a military consultant of the Group of Inspectors General before his retirement in 1987. He died in 1997, having received numerous honours and awards.

== Early years and education ==
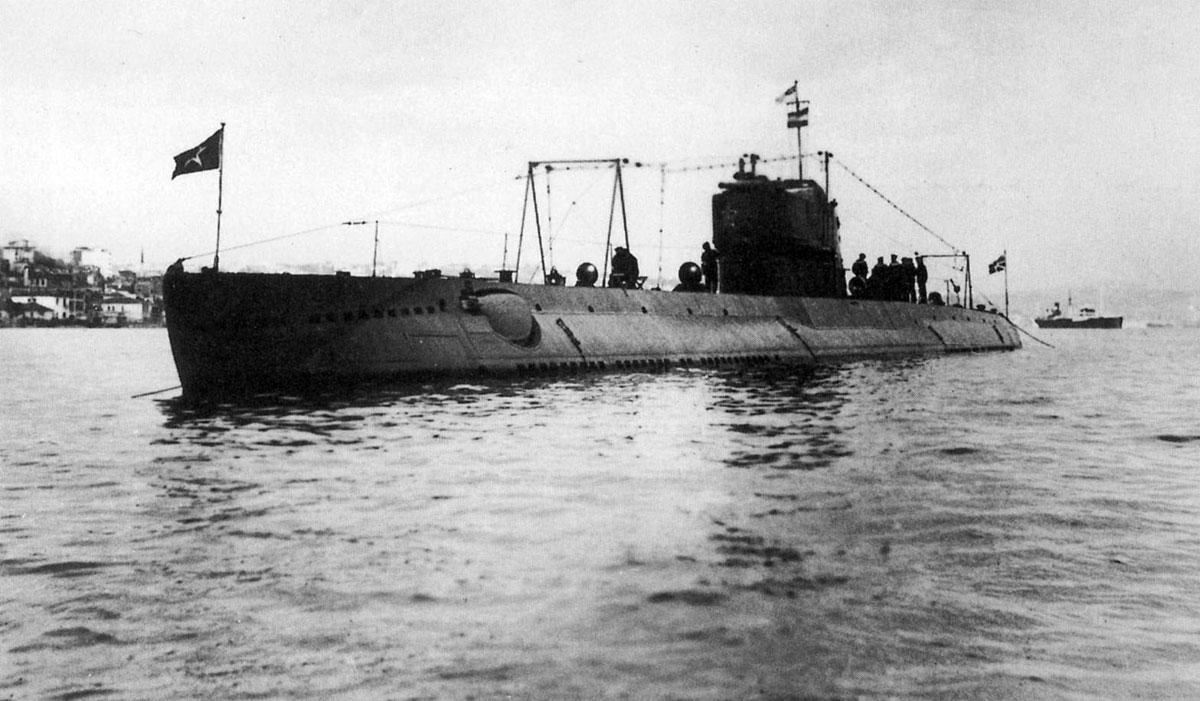
The submarine Revolyutsioner in 1933. Oryol's first submarine posting, from December 1932 to March 1933.

Oryol was born on 25 August 1908 in Saint Petersburg, in what was then the Russian Empire. He began his career as a sailor, and then a helmsman of a river steamer between 1924 and 1928, while studying at the Omsk Water Technical School. Graduating in 1929, he was assistant captain of the steamer III Internatsional in Omsk that year. He joined the Red Navy that year, studying at the M. V. Frunze Naval School and graduating in 1932. In December 1932, he was appointed head of the navigation department of the submarine Revolyutsioner, transferring to be navigator aboard the submarine Garibaldiets in March 1933. In July 1933, Oryol became division navigator of the Black Sea Fleet's Separate Submarine Division, based in Nikolayev, before becoming a department head aboard the submarine M-9 in November 1933. He served in this role until December 1934, subsequently taking the classes of the Kirov Submarine Training Detachment in early 1935, and then serving as executive officer on the submarine Shch-302 in the Baltic Fleet between June and October 1935.

In October 1935, Oryol transferred to become executive officer of S-1, remaining as such until June 1937. He joined the All-Union Communist Party (Bolsheviks). In July 1937, he was appointed captain of S-1, his first command. He left S-1 in February 1938, and in March 1938, was appointed chief of staff of the Baltic Fleet's 3rd Submarine Brigade. He held this position until May 1939, during which time he was promoted to captain 3rd rank on 28 January 1939. In May 1939, Oryol was appointed commander of the Baltic Fleet's 21st Submarine Division, serving in this role at the outbreak of the Winter War with Finland in November that year. In May 1940, he was appointed chief of staff of the 2nd Submarine Brigade, and then in September, its commander. He was promoted to captain 2nd rank on 11 December 1940, and took the Naval Academy's Higher Special Officer Classes in 1941.

== Second World War ==
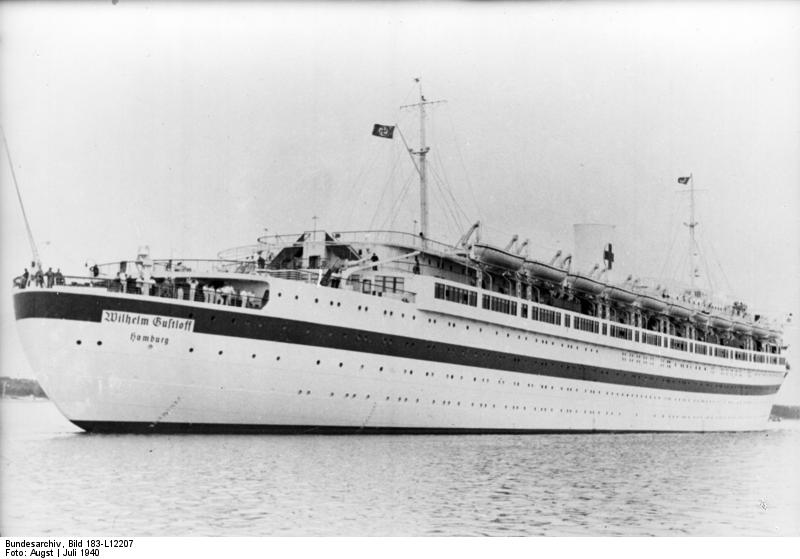
MV Wilhelm Gustloff, sunk in 1945 by one of Oryol's submarine commanders, Alexander Marinesko. Oryol nominated him, unsuccessfully, for the title of Hero of the Soviet Union.

Oryol was appointed deputy commander of the Baltic Fleet's submarine brigade in August 1941, shortly after the Axis invasion of the Soviet Union in June that year. In October 1941, he was moved to the post of deputy head of the Baltic Fleet Headquarters' intelligence department. From February 1943, he was head of the 1st section of the submarine navigation department at headquarters, and then in May 1943, commander of the 1st Submarine Division. While commander of the division, on 20 February 1945, Oryol submitted one of the captains under his commander, Alexander Marinesko, for the award of the title of Hero of the Soviet Union. Marinesko, who while in command of S-13 sank the German ships MV Wilhelm Gustloff and SS Steuben in late January and early February 1945, had become the most successful Soviet submarine commander of the war in terms of tonnage sunk. Marinesko was however a controversial choice for honouring, and was at the time facing a court martial due to his problems with alcohol. He was instead granted the lesser award of the Order of the Red Banner, and was demoted in rank and dishonorably discharged from the navy in October 1945. Oryol was pressured by the Navy's Political Directorate to withdraw his support for Marinesko, but refused, continuing to advocate that Marinesko should be fully rewarded. Marinesko was eventually reinstated as captain 3rd rank in 1960 with a pension, before his death in 1963. He was posthumously awarded the Hero of the Soviet Union, which Oryol had recommended him for in 1945, only in 1990. Oryol meanwhile remained in his post as commander of the 1st Submarine Division until the end of the war in August 1945, having taken part in a combat cruise aboard the L-21 in March 1945.

== Postwar service ==
After the war, Oryol was in August 1945 appointed as a technical expert to the Soviet representative office to the Tripartite Naval Commission, established to divide up the ships of the German fleet amongst the Allies. His part in this was complete by October 1945, when he was appointed chief of staff of the 1st Submarine Brigade until May 1947, and in July 1947, its commander. He held this role until March 1951, being promoted to rear-admiral on 27 January 1951. In March 1951, Oryol was appointed commander of the 27th Submarine Division of the 4th Navy, one of the two halves the Baltic Fleet was for a time divided into. He left in December 1951 to study at the naval faculty of the Military Academy of the General Staff, graduating in 1953, and being appointed head of the Combat Training Directorate's second department. In 1954 he was put in charge of a panel assessing the Project 627 Kit design for a nuclear submarine, originally designed to carry the T-15 nuclear torpedo. The Navy Commander-in-Chief, Nikolai Kuznetsov, rejected the concept of the nuclear torpedo carrying submarine, so Oryol's panel suggested completing the design as a conventional torpedo attack boat. Kuznetsov approved the suggestion, and the design was developed as the NATO-reporting name November-class submarine.

In May 1955, Oryol became a deputy Commander-in-Chief of the Navy, and head of the Naval General Staff's submarine department. He served in this role until May 1956, when he became commander of the Northern Fleet's submarine forces. He played an important role in the introduction of nuclear submarines into the navy, and was promoted to vice-admiral on 18 February 1958.

In May 1959, Oryol was appointed commander of the Baltic Fleet, a post he held until January 1967. He was promoted to admiral on 13 April 1964, and in January 1967 left the Baltic Fleet to take up the position of head of the Naval Academy. He was awarded the academic title of professor in 1970, stepping down from the position of academy head in March 1974 and becoming a military consultant of the Group of Inspectors General. He was twice a deputy of the Supreme Soviet of the Soviet Union, for its sixth and seventh convocations. Oryol stepped down from the Group of Inspectors General in November 1987, and retired from service the following month. He died in Saint Petersburg on 20 June 1997, and was buried in the city's Serafimovskoe Cemetery.

== Honours and awards ==
Over his career Oryol received a number of Soviet, Russian, and foreign awards. The Russian Federation awarded Oryol the Order of Zhukov in 1995. The Soviet government awarded him the Order of Lenin in 1954 and 1976, the Order of the October Revolution in 1972, the Order of the Red Banner four times, in 1940, 1944, 1945, and 1959, the Order of Ushakov second class in 1945, the Order of the Patriotic War first class in 1945 and 1985, the Order of the Red Banner of Labour in 1978, the Order of the Red Star in 1944, and the Order "For Service to the Homeland in the Armed Forces of the USSR" third class in 1975, as well as various medals. He also received a personalized weapon in 1958. From the German Democratic Republic he was awarded the Patriotic Order of Merit in silver in 1965, while the Polish People's Republic appointed him a Commander with star of the Order of Polonia Restituta in 1973, and a Knight of the Virtuti Militari in 1968. The People's Republic of Bulgaria awarded him the Order of 9 September 1944 first class.
