= SMS G196 =

German large torpedo boat/destroyer

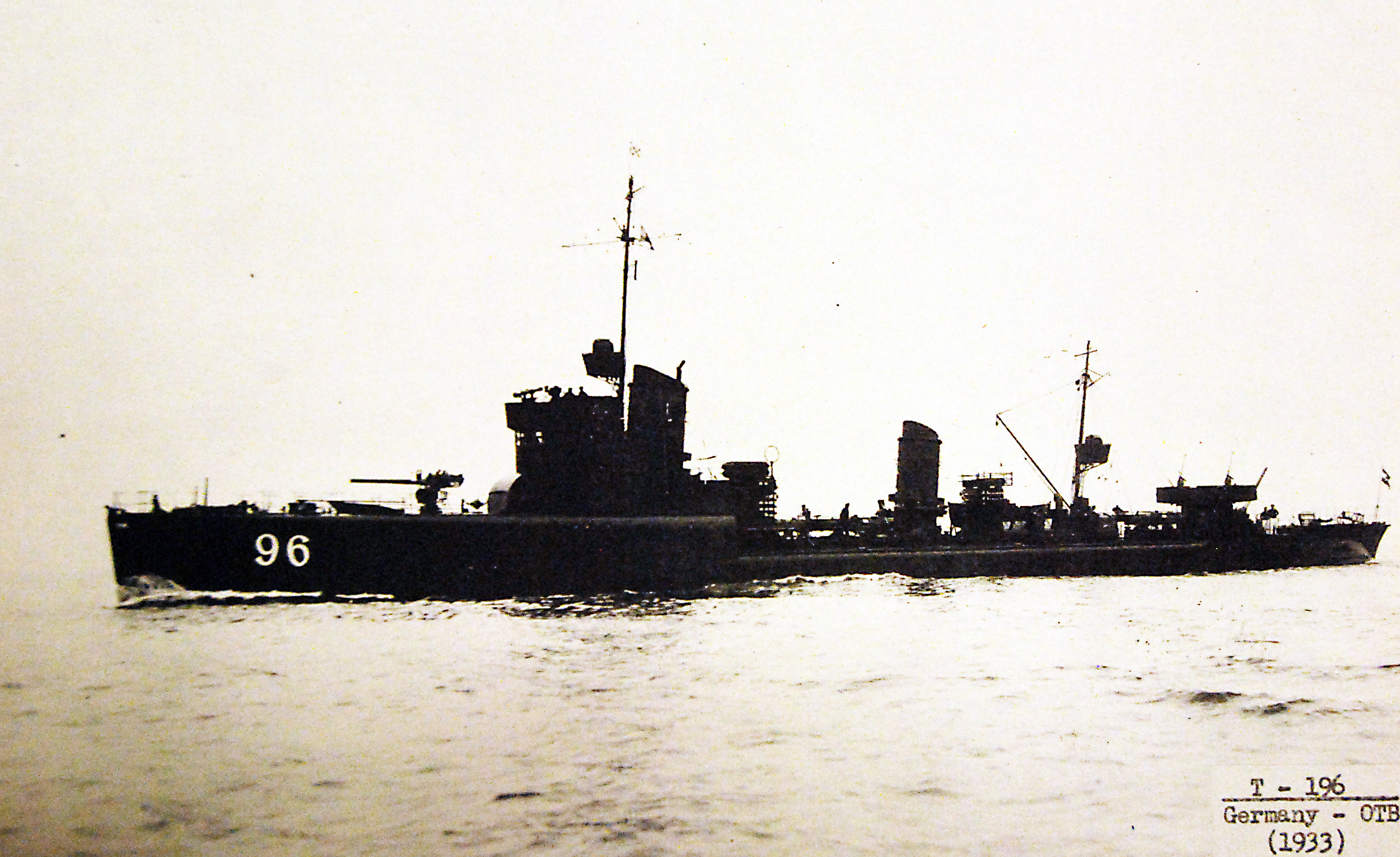
- T196 after 1923

History

German Empire
- Name: SMS G196
- Builder: Germaniawerft, Kiel
- Launched: 25 May 1911
- Completed: 2 October 1911

General characteristics
- Class & type: S138-class torpedo boat
- Displacement: 660 t (650 long tons) design
- Length: 74.0 m (242 ft 9 in) o/a
- Beam: 7.06 m (23 ft 2 in)
- Draught: 3.1 m (10 ft 2 in)
- Installed power: 18,200 PS (18,000 shp; 13,400 kW)
- Propulsion: 3 × boilers; 2 × steam turbines
- Speed: 32 kn (37 mph; 59 km/h)
- Complement: 84
- Armament: 2× 8.8 cm guns; 4× 50 cm torpedo tubes

SMS G196 (Note: "SMS" stands for "Seiner Majestät Schiff" (transl. His Majesty's Ship)) (Note: The "G" in G196 denoted the shipbuilder who constructed her.) was a S-138-class large torpedo boat of the Imperial German Navy. She was built by the Germaniawerft shipyard at Kiel between 1910 and 1911, and was launched on 25 May 1911, entering service later that year. She served throughout the First World War, taking part in the Battle of Heligoland Bight on 28 August 1914. She was renamed T196 in February 1918.

Post war, T196 served in the Weimar Republic's Reichsmarine, being rebuilt and modernised in 1923. She was still in service on the outbreak of the Second World War, taking part in the German Invasion of Poland at the start of the war and the evacuation of East Prussia towards the end of the war in Europe.

She survived the war, and was transferred to the Soviet Navy in 1945, and was renamed Pronzitelny. The ship was stricken in 1949.

== Construction and design ==
The Imperial German Navy ordered 12 large torpedo boats (Große Torpedoboote) as part of the fiscal year 1910 shipbuilding programme, with one half-flotilla of six ships ordered from Germaniawerft and the other six ships from AG Vulcan. The two groups of torpedo boats were of basically similar layout but differed slightly in detailed design, with a gradual evolution of design and increase in displacement with each year's orders.

G196 was 74.0 metres (242 ft 9 in) long overall and 73.6 metres (241 ft 6 in) between perpendiculars, with a beam of 7.06 metres (23 ft 2 in) and a draught of 3.1 metres (10 ft 2 in). The ship displaced 660 tonnes (650 long tons) design and 810 tonnes (800 long tons) deep load.

Three coal-fired and one oil-fired water-tube boiler fed steam at a pressure of 18.5 standard atmospheres (272 psi) to two sets of direct-drive steam turbines. The ship's machinery was rated at 18,200 PS (18,000 shp; 13,400 kW) giving a design speed of 32 knots (37 mph; 59 km/h), with members of the class reaching a speed of 33.5 knots (38.6 mph; 62.0 km/h) during sea trials. 145 tons of coal and 76 tons of oil fuel were carried, giving an endurance of 2,590 nautical miles (2,980 mi; 4,800 km) at 12 knots (14 mph; 22 km/h), 1,150 nautical miles (1,320 mi; 2,130 km) at 17 knots (20 mph; 31 km/h) or 420 nautical miles (480 mi; 780 km) at 30 knots (35 mph; 56 km/h).

The ship was armed with two 8.8 cm L/45 guns, (Note: Both Conway's All The World's Fighting Ships and Jane's Fighting Ships claim L/30 guns were fitted.) one on the forecastle and one aft. Four single 50 cm (19.7 in) torpedo tubes were fitted, with two on the ship's beam in the gap between the forecastle and the ship's bridge which were capable of firing straight ahead, one between the ship's two funnels, and one aft of the funnels. The ship had a crew of 84 officers and men.

G196 was laid down at Germaniawerft's Kiel shipyard as Yard number 156 and was launched on 25 May 1911 and completed on 2 October 1911.

The ship was extensively modified in 1923, with the forecastle being lengthened to behind the first funnel, the bridge structure and funnels being modified. The boilers were replaced by three oil-fired boilers, with power dropping to 11,200 metric horsepower (11,000 shp; 8,200 kW) and speed to 27.3 knots (31.4 mph; 50.6 km/h). Two 10.5 cm L/45 guns replaced the 8.8 cm guns, while the torpedo armament remained four 50 cm tubes, but arranged in two single and one twin mount. By the Second World War, her torpedo tubes had been removed, while two 20 mm anti-aircraft guns had been added.

== Service ==
On commissioning, G196 joined the 2nd Half Flotilla of the 1st Torpedo Flotilla, and remained part of the 2nd Half Flotilla in 1914.

=== First World War ===
On 28 August 1914, the British Harwich Force, supported by light cruisers and battlecruisers of the Grand Fleet, carried out a raid towards Heligoland with the intention of destroying patrolling German torpedo boats. The German defensive patrols around Heligoland consisted of one flotilla (the 1st Torpedo Flotilla) of 12 modern torpedo boats forming an outer patrol line about 25 nautical miles (29 mi; 46 km) North and West of Heligoland, with an inner line of older torpedo boats of the 3rd Minesweeping Division at about 12 nautical miles (14 mi; 22 km). Four German light cruisers and another flotilla of torpedo boats (the 5th Torpedo Boat Flotilla) was in the vicinity of Heligoland. G196, a member of the 2nd Half Flotilla of the 1st Torpedo Flotilla, formed part of the outer screen of torpedo boats. At about 06:00 on 28 August, G194, another member of the outer screen reported spotting the periscope of a submarine. As a result, the 5th Torpedo Boat Flotilla was ordered out to hunt the hostile submarine. At 07:57 G194 was fired on by British warships, and soon G194 and G196 were retreating towards Heligoland, pursued by four British destroyers. The 5th Flotilla and the old torpedo boats of the 3rd Minesweeping Division also came under British fire, and were only saved by the intervention of the German cruisers Stettin and Frauenlob, with the torpedo boats V1, D8 and T111 damaged. The Torpedo boat V187, leader of the 1st Flotilla, trying to return to Heligoland on hearing gunfire, ran into the midst of the Harwich force and was sunk. The intervention of the supporting British forces resulted in the sinking of the German cruisers Mainz, Cöln and Ariadne. The British light cruiser Arethusa and destroyers Laurel, Laertes and Liberty were badly damaged but safely returned to base. G196 was undamaged.

On 23 August 1915, G196, along with G192 and G194, escorted the newly commissioned battlecruiser Lützow from Danzig to Kiel, with the ships arriving at their destination on 24 August. On 11 September 1915, the German cruisers Stralsund and Regensburg set out from Wilhelmshaven to lay a minefield off the Swarte Bank in the North Sea, with the High Seas Fleet sailing in support. On the return trip, at 01:50 hr on 12 September, the High Seas Fleet ran into a newly laid British minefield. G196, which was 500 metres (1,600 ft) off the port beam of the battleship Kaiser, struck one of the mines and was badly damaged, being towed into port by V189. Seven of G196's crew were killed, with a further eight wounded.

In 1918 G196 joined an Escort Flotilla, and she was renamed T196 on 22 February 1918. She remained a member of the 1st Half-flotilla of the 1st Escort Flotilla at the end of the war. (Note: The 1st Escort Flotilla comprised three Half-flotillas, with a total of 36 torpedo boats operated.)

=== Between the wars ===
After the end of the First World War, the scuttling of the German High Seas Fleet at Scapa Flow on 21 June 1919 and the Treaty of Versailles left Germany with a small navy of obsolete warships. The Versailles treaty limited the German Navy's torpedo forces to 16 destroyers and 16 torpedo boats, with only twelve of each in active service, with replacement of the existing ships not allowed until 15 years after they were launched. Replacements could not exceed 800 t displacement for destroyers and 200 t for torpedo boats. T196 was retained as a destroyer under the treaty, and remained in active service in the new Reichsmarine. (Note: Although treated as destroyers under the Versailles Treaty, these ships were always considered as Torpedo Boats by the Germans.) In 1923 T196 was allocated to the North Sea station. T196 was modernised in 1923, but was still obsolete and in the 1930s was transferred to subsidiary roles, being used for training and as a Fleet Tender, and from 1938 as a minesweeper command ship.

=== Second World War ===
On the outbreak of the Second World War on 1 September 1939, T196 was the flagship of the Officer Commanding Minesweepers and was deployed in support on the German Invasion of Poland. On 4 September T196, along with the pre-dreadnought battleship Schleswig-Holstein and the old minesweeper Von der Groeben (formerly M107), bombarded Westerplatte.

In late January 1945, the Germans began a mass evacuation of soldiers and civilians from East Prussia and Danzig, which were threatened by the advance of Soviet forces. On 10 February T196 and the torpedo recovery vessel TF19 were escorting the liner Steuben from Pillau, when the Soviet submarine S-13 torpedoed and sank Steuben. Only about 300 of the more than 3000 aboard could be saved.

=== Soviet Union ===
On 27 December 1945 T196 was transferred to the Soviet Union as a War Prize, named Pronzitelny (Note: Lenton lists the ship's new name as Pronzitelny while Conway's gives the new name as Pronsitelniy.) (Russian: Пронзителъньій) The ship joined the Soviet Baltic Fleet in February 1946 and was stricken for scrapping on 30 April 1949.

== Bibliography ==
- Beevor, Antony (2002). Berlin; The Downfall 1945. London: Viking. ISBN 0-670-88695-5.
- Berezhnoy, Sergey (1994). Трофеи и репарации ВМФ СССР [Trophies and reparations of the Soviet Navy] (in Russian). Yakutsk: Sakhapoligrafizdat. OCLC 33334505.
- Dodson, Aidan (2019). "Beyond the Kaiser: The IGN's Destroyers and Torpedo Boats After 1918". In Jordan, John (ed.). Warship 2019. Oxford, UK: Osprey Publishing. pp. 129–144. ISBN 978-1-4728-3595-6.
- Fock, Harald (1989). Z-Vor! Internationale Entwicklung und Kriegseinsätze von Zerstörern und Torpedobooten 1914 bis 1939 (in German). Herford, Germany: Koehlers Verlagsgesellschaft mBH. ISBN 3-7822-0207-4.
- Gardiner, Robert; Chesneau, Robert, eds. (1980). Conway's All The World's Fighting Ships 1922–1946. London: Conway Maritime Press. ISBN 0-85177-146-7.
- Gardiner, Robert; Gray, Randal, eds. (1985). Conway's All The World's Fighting Ships 1906–1921. London: Conway Maritime Press. ISBN 0-85177-245-5.
- Gröner, Erich; Jung, Dieter; Maass, Martin (1983). Die deutschen Kriegsschiffe 1815–1945: Band 2: Torpedoboote, Zerstörer, Schnellboote, Minensuchboote, Minenräumboote (in German). Koblenz: Bernard & Graef Verlag. ISBN 3-7637-4801-6.
- Groos, O. (1924). Der Krieg in der Nordsee: Vierter Band: Von Anfang Februar bis Ende Dezember 1915. Der Krieg zur See: 1914–1918 (in German). Berlin: Verlag von E. S. Mittler und Sohn – via National Library of Estonia.
- Halpern, Paul G. (1994). A Naval History of World War I. London: UCL Press. ISBN 1-85728-498-4.
- Koop, Gerhard; Schmolke, Klaus-Peter (2014). German Destroyers of World War II. Barnsley, UK: Seaforth Publishing. ISBN 978-1-84832-193-9.
- Lenton, H. T. (1975). German Warships of the Second World War. London: Macdonald and Jane's. ISBN 0-356-04661-3.
- Massie, Robert K. (2007). Castles of Steel: Britain, Germany and the Winning of the Great War at Sea. London: Vintage Books. ISBN 978-0-099-52378-9.
- Moore, John (1990). Jane's Fighting Ships of World War I. London: Studio. ISBN 1-85170-378-0.
- Monograph No. 11: The Battle of the Heligoland Bight, August 28th, 1914 (PDF). Naval Staff Monographs (Historical). Vol. III. Naval Staff, Training and Staff Duties Division. 1921. pp. 108–166.
- Monograph No. 30 Home Waters—Part V.: From July to August 1915 (PDF). Naval Staff Monographs (Historical). Vol. XIV. Naval Staff, Training and Staff Duties Division. 1926.
- Parkes, Oscar, ed. (1973) [First published 1931 by Sampson Low, Marston]. Jane's Fighting Ships 1931. David & Charles (Publishers) Limited. ISBN 0-7153-5849-9.
- Rohwer, Jürgen; Hümmelchen, Gerhard (1992). Chronology of the War at Sea 1939–1945. London: Greenhill Books. ISBN 1-85367-117-7.
- Staff, Gary (2014). German Battlecruisers of World War One: Their Design, Construction and Operation. Barnsley, UK: Seaforth Publishing. ISBN 9781848323070.
