= SS Albert Ballin =

German ocean liner built in 1923

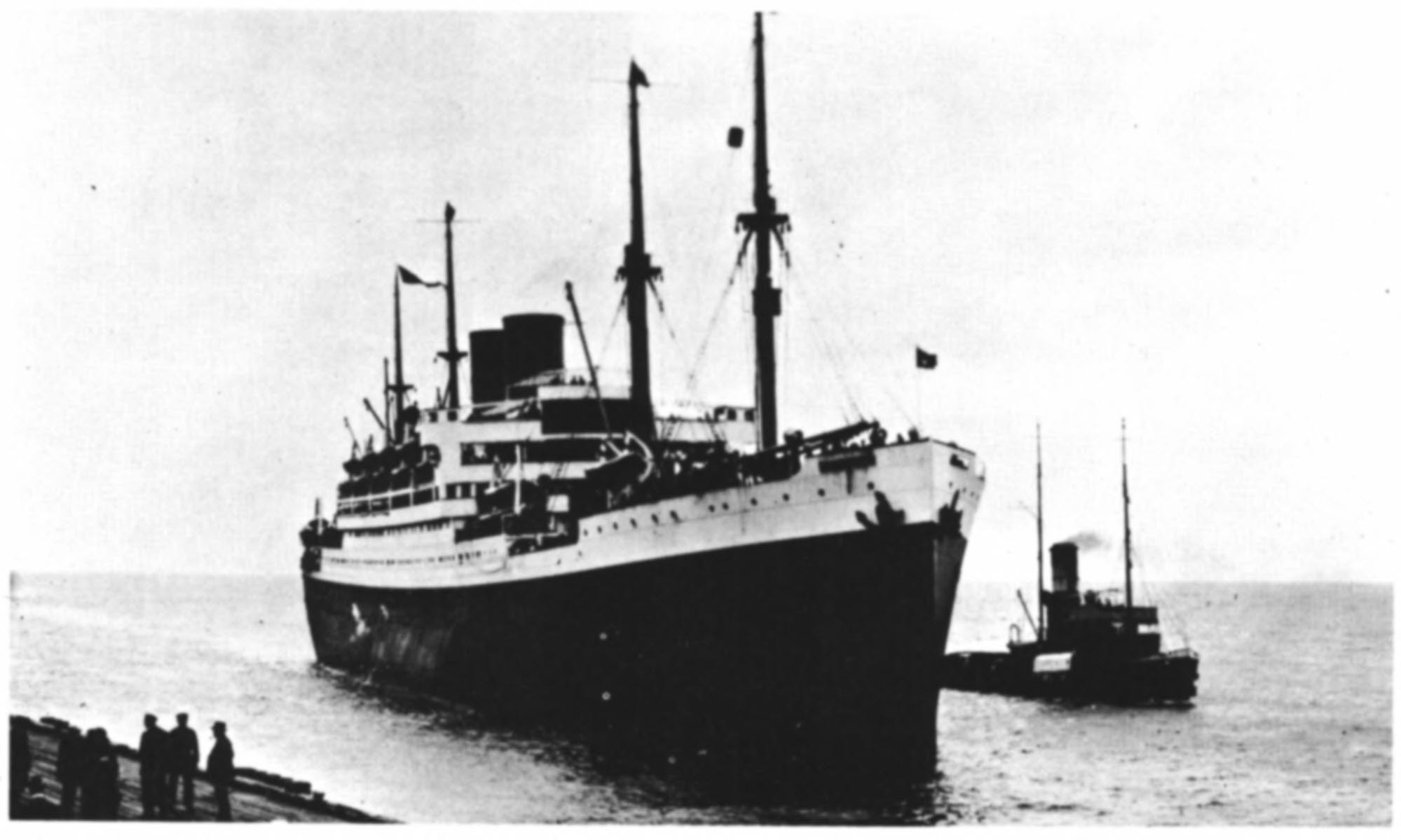
- SS Albert Ballin pulling in to port on September 27th 1923

History

Weimar Republic
- Name: Albert Ballin
- Namesake: Albert Ballin
- Owner: Hamburg-America Line
- Builder: Blohm & Voss, Hamburg
- Launched: 16 December 1922
- Maiden voyage: 5 July 1923
- Fate: Requisitioned by the Kriegsmarine, 1940

Nazi Germany
- Name: Hansa
- Operator: Hamburg-America Line
- In service: 31 October 1935
- Fate: Sunk 6 March 1945, Warnemünde

Soviet Union
- Name: Sovetskiy Soyuz (translate as "Soviet Union")
- Acquired: By salvage, 1949
- In service: 1953–1982
- Renamed: 1980, Tobolsk
- Fate: Scrapped, 1982

General characteristics (1923)
- Type: Ocean liner
- Tonnage: 20,815 GRT
- Length: 183.61m
- Beam: 22.18m
- Speed: 16 knots
- Capacity: 1650 passengers
- Notes: Sister ship Deustchland

SS Albert Ballin was an ocean liner of the Hamburg-America Line launched in 1923 and named after Albert Ballin, the former director of the line who died in 1918. In 1935, the ship was renamed Hansa on orders from the German government. Towards the end of World War II, she was employed to evacuate civilians during Operation Hannibal and sank after hitting a mine. She was later raised and refitted by the Soviet Union and was finally scrapped in 1982.

== History ==
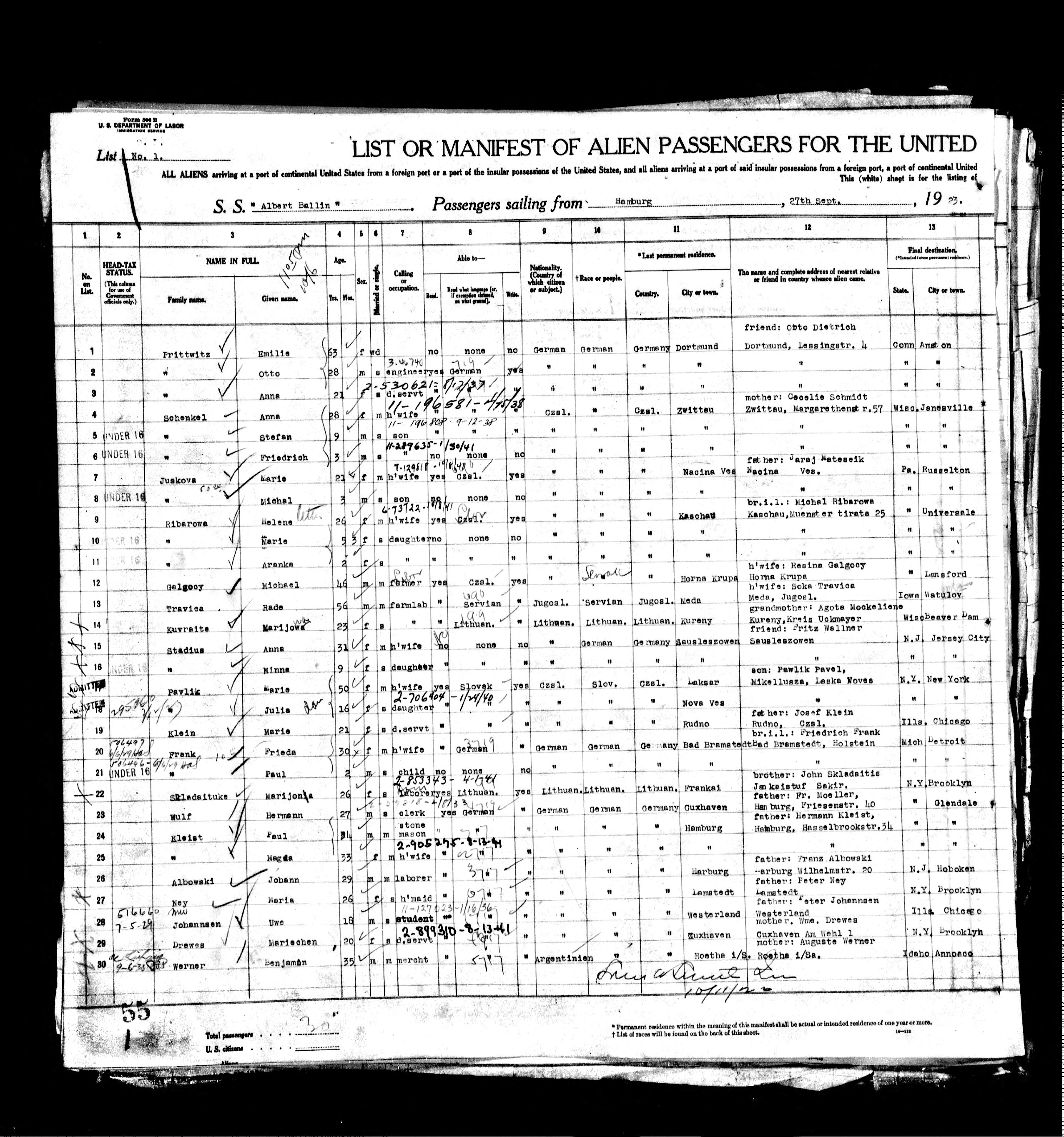
Passenger manifest for the SS Albert Ballin, September 27, 1923.

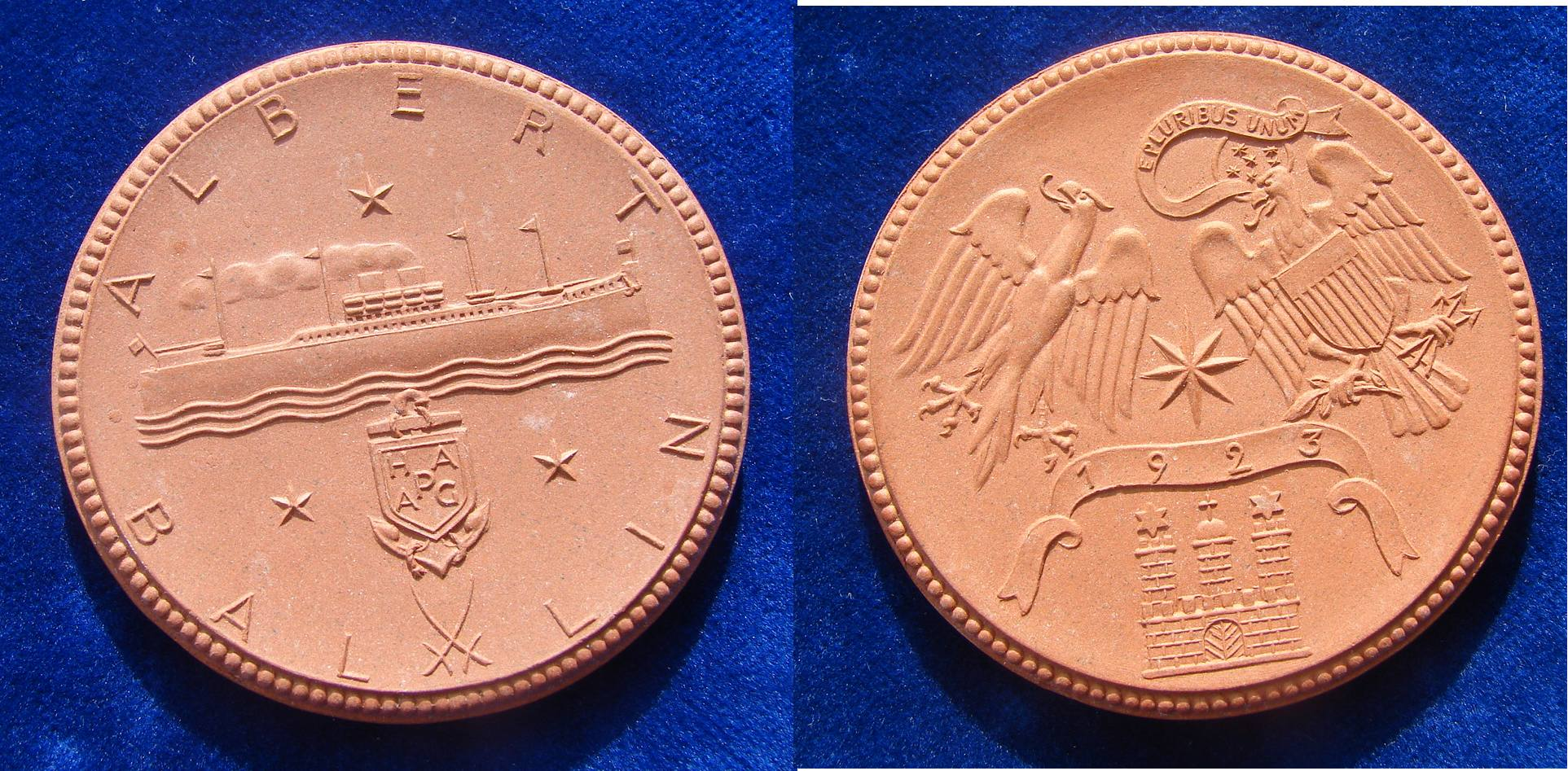
1923 Commemorative Porcelain Medal for the Maiden Voyage of the SS Albert Ballin from Hamburg to New York via Southampton.

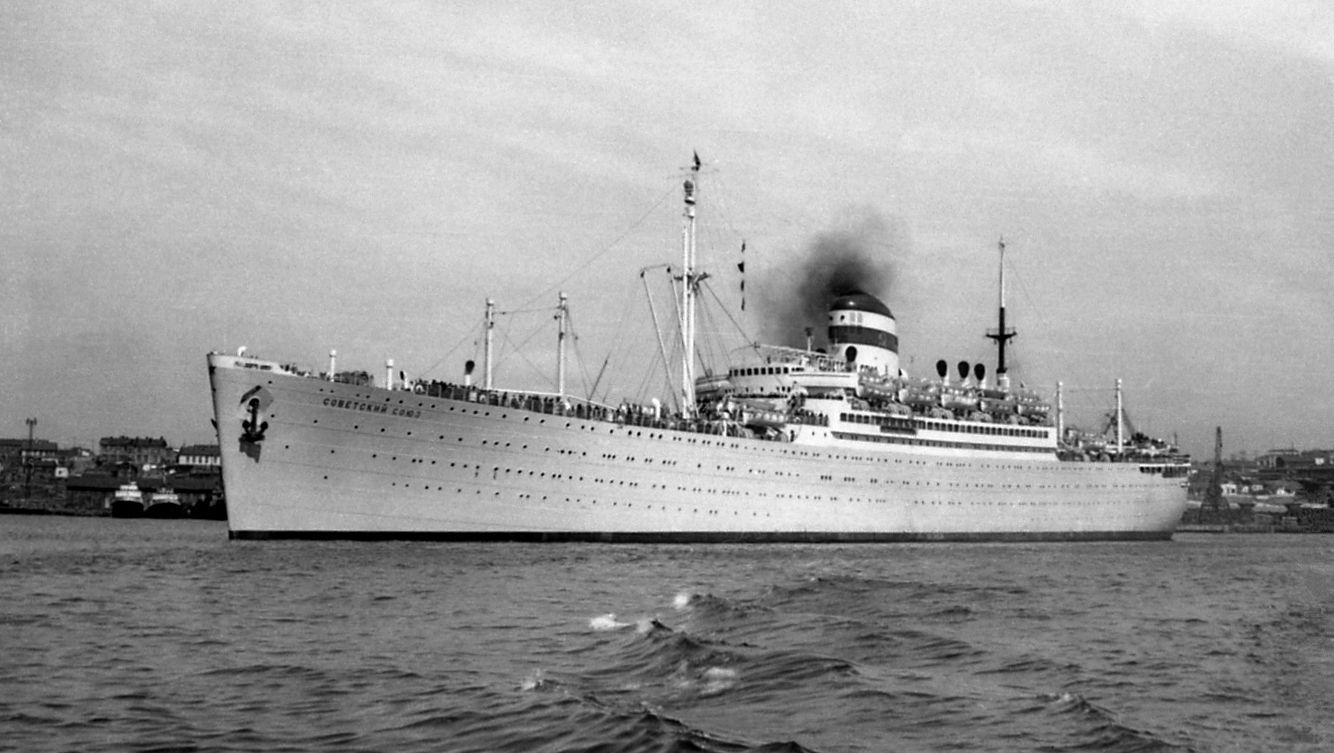
Soviet passenger cargo ship Sovetskiy Soyuz in the Soviet Union (Golden Horn Bay, Vladivostok) in 1957

=== Hamburg America Line ===
Albert Ballin was built by Blohm & Voss in Hamburg, and served on the Hamburg-New York City route. In 1928, a tourist class was added. Originally built as a 16 knot ship, the engines were replaced in 1929, resulting in a speed of 19 knots. In 1934, she was lengthened by 50 feet, and speed increased again, this time to 21.5 knots.

In 1935, the new Nazi government ordered the ship be renamed Hansa (Ballin having been Jewish). Hansa's last Atlantic crossing was in 1939.

In 1945, she was employed to evacuate civilians from Gotenhafen during Operation Hannibal, and was due to accompany the overloaded MV Wilhelm Gustloff leaving midday on 30 January, but suffered mechanical problems before the ships had left the Bay of Danzig and had to anchor. Later, on 6 March during a further evacuation, she hit a mine off Warnemünde and slowly sank.

=== Soviet Union ===
The wreck was raised and rebuilt by the Soviet Union around 1949, and renamed Sovetskiy Soyuz (Russian: Советский Союз; meaning Soviet Union), becoming the largest passenger ship operating under the Soviet flag. From 1955, she operated between Vladivostok and points in the Far East. Renamed Tobolsk (Russian: Тобольск) in 1980, she sailed under that name for almost two years before being scrapped.

== See also ==
- Stanislav Kurilov
