= Alexander Marinesko =

Soviet naval officer

- Marinesko in 1945
- Born: 15 January [O.S. 2 January] 1913; Odessa, Kherson Governorate, Russian Empire
- Died: 25 November 1963 (aged 50); Leningrad, Russian SFSR, Soviet Union
- Military career
- Allegiance: Soviet Union
- Branch: Soviet Navy
- Service years: 1933 – 1945
- Rank: Captain 3rd rank
- Awards: Hero of the Soviet Union; Order of Lenin (2); Order of the Red Banner (2)

Alexander Ivanovich Marinesko (15 January [O.S. 2 January] 1913 – 25 November 1963) (Note: Russian: Александр Иванович Маринеско, Ukrainian: Олександр Іванович Маринеско, Romanian: Alexandru Marinescu) was a Soviet career naval officer. During the last year of World War II, he became known as the captain of the submarine S-13, which sank the German military transport ship Wilhelm Gustloff in the Baltic Sea in January 1945. It was evacuating soldiers, medics, and other military personnel of Army Group North, as well as civilians who wanted to flee to Germany. Around 9,300 of the more than 10,000 passengers and crew died.

Marinesko was the most successful Soviet submarine commander in terms of gross register tonnage (GRT) sunk, with 42,000 GRT to his name, but at the time the government considered him personally unsuitable for the highest award. In 1990 he was posthumously awarded the title Hero of the Soviet Union by President Mikhail Gorbachev.

== Early life ==
Marinesko was born in Odessa on 15 January 1913 into a working-class family. His father, Ion Marinescu (later known as Ivan Alekseyevich Marinesko), was a Romanian who had been orphaned at the age of seven and worked as a farmhand until adulthood. Conscripted into the Romanian Navy in 1893, he beat a non-commissioned officer during a voyage, escaped from the punishment cell where he was then held, and fled to the Russian Empire. He worked in Odessa as a stoker, fitter, and machinist, and kept his Romanian citizenship until 1924. Marinesko's mother, Tatyana Mikhaylovna Koval, was a Ukrainian from a peasant family in the Kherson Governorate who had come to Odessa as a domestic servant. Most of Marinesko's service records give his nationality as Ukrainian. He had a sister, Valentina.

The family lived in the Poltava Governorate from 1917 to 1923. After finishing Odessa labour school No. 36 (now School No. 105) in 1926, Marinesko became an apprentice seaman in the merchant fleet. From 1927 to 1930, he attended a school for ship's boys, qualifying as a seaman first class, and he then studied at the Odessa Maritime Technical School, graduating in 1933 as an ocean-going navigator. Training voyages with the Black Sea Shipping Company took him to many ports in Europe and the Middle East. From May to October 1933, he was mate of the steamer Krasny Flot on the Crimea–Caucasus route, and was commended by the commander of the Black Sea Fleet for helping to save a border-guard boat during a storm.

== Pre-war naval career ==
In October 1933, Marinesko was called up for military service and sent to the Special Classes for Command Personnel of the Red Army Naval Forces in Leningrad. He had hoped to remain in the merchant fleet and disliked the strict regimentation of military service. In November 1934, he became navigating officer of the Shchuka-class submarine Shch-306 Piksha of the Baltic Fleet. The appointment, unusually senior for the graduate of a one-year course, reflected a shortage of officers at a time when large numbers of new submarines were entering service. He was commissioned a lieutenant when personal ranks were introduced in March 1936, and, in November 1937, began a year-long course for submarine executive officers. On 16 July 1938, during the purge of the armed forces, he was discharged, probably because of his father's Romanian origin, but he was reinstated on 7 August and allowed to finish the course. Promoted to senior lieutenant in November 1938, he served as executive officer of the Leninets-class submarine L-1 and, in May 1939, was given command of the M-class submarine M-96, then still under construction; she completed her trials and was commissioned later that year.

M-96 did not take part in the Winter War. In 1940, she was rated the best boat of the 3rd Submarine Brigade in torpedo and gunnery firing and one of the best in the fleet, and the People's Commissar of the Navy, Nikolay Kuznetsov, presented Marinesko with a gold watch for his handling of torpedo fire. Marinesko became a candidate member of the Communist Party in March 1940 and was promoted to captain-lieutenant in November; his divisional commander, Yevgeny Yunakov, recommended him for command of a larger S-class boat. He was reprimanded twice that year: in February for starting a fire with a discarded cigarette in the cabin of his friend Alexander Mylnikov, commander of M-97, and in September after his inaction contributed to a collision between M-96 and a launch. On 29 May 1941, in Tallinn, Marinesko and the boat's chief electrician, who was also secretary of its party organisation, drank in a restaurant and were involved in a fight with Estonians. Marinesko returned to the boat heavily drunk at noon, four hours late, and M-96 was unable to sail as ordered at 10 a.m. He lost his long-service pay supplement for three months.

== World War II ==
=== M-96 (1941–1943) ===
At the start of the German invasion, M-96 was one of only two Baltic Fleet submarines rated fully combat-ready; she had patrolled the mouth of the Gulf of Finland from 14 to 21 June 1941. Her first months of war were disrupted by engine breakdowns, one of them caused by crew error, and her only patrol, in the Gulf of Riga from 22 to 29 July, met no enemy shipping. In August, she was earmarked for transfer by rail to the Caspian Sea as a training boat, and her machinery had already been removed when the siege of Leningrad made the move impossible. She was not ready for action again until 10 November, too late for the autumn patrols.

Following Soviet defeats in the autumn of 1941, discipline in the Baltic Fleet's submarine force declined. A political report described heavy drinking aboard M-96 and noted that Marinesko had organised card games for money among the division's officers. In the disciplinary measures that followed, eight commanders and political officers of the submarine brigade were tried, four of whom were sentenced to death, and 23 others, Marinesko among them, were disciplined by the party. He was expelled as a candidate member for "systematic drinking, the collapse of discipline, the absence of educational work, and insincere admission of his mistakes".

On 14 February 1942, while laid up in Leningrad, M-96 was holed by a German artillery shell that flooded two compartments; repairs lasted until July. On 12 August, she sailed from the island of Lavansaari to patrol between Tallinn and Helsinki. Two days later, Marinesko fired a single torpedo from periscope depth at a convoy at a range of 12 cables, (Note: A cable (kabeltov) is one-tenth of a nautical mile, or 185.2 m.) reported hearing an explosion, and claimed to have seen a large transport sinking by the bow. German records show that the convoy, made up of the transport Porto Alegre (6,104 GRT) and two smaller vessels escorted by two heavy floating batteries, spotted and evaded the torpedo and reached Tallinn without loss. After firing, M-96 briefly broke surface, exposing her conning tower, and was attacked with gunfire and eleven depth charges, but was not seriously damaged. On 19 August, short of fuel and air-regeneration cartridges, Marinesko broke off the patrol early without informing headquarters. Near Lavansaari on 22 August, the boat was attacked by two Soviet patrol boats that had not been warned of her return; she escaped undamaged and reached Kronstadt on 25 August. During the patrol, she crossed minefields 39 times, most of them unknown to her commander, and once brushed a mine mooring cable without detonating the mine; her sister boats M-95 and M-97, which used the same route before and after her, were both lost to mines. The Soviet command credited Marinesko with sinking a transport, and he was awarded the Order of Lenin and readmitted as a candidate member of the party.

From 8 to 12 November 1942, M-96 landed a five-man reconnaissance party from Baltic Fleet headquarters in Narva Bay, with orders to seize a prisoner and enemy equipment. (Note: Claims in the literature that the party raided a German regimental headquarters to capture an Enigma machine are not supported by documents.) The party returned with a prisoner and the equipment, but one of its boats capsized as it came alongside, drowning three of the scouts and the prisoner. On this patrol, the submarine crossed 17 lines of mines and twice touched mooring cables. A recommendation that Marinesko receive the Order of the Red Banner was not acted upon, but he was promoted to captain 3rd rank on 23 November 1942. His divisional commander's evaluation for 1942 was favourable and recommended him for a larger boat, while noting that "ashore he is inclined to frequent drinking".

=== S-13 (1943–1944) ===
In April 1943, Marinesko took command of the S-class submarine S-13, whose previous commander, Pyotr Malanchenko, had been relieved after a cartridge explosion during gunnery practice killed a sailor. By mid-1943, Axis mine and net barrages had closed the Gulf of Finland; after several submarines were lost trying to break through, the Soviet command suspended submarine operations in the Baltic, and S-13 spent the year in training. During 1943, Marinesko was twice disciplined by the party for drinking and absence without leave and spent two days under arrest for negligence, and a political report noted his systematic drinking and his relationships with other women. When his wife returned to Leningrad from evacuation in the spring of 1944, she learned that he had been living with another woman, further damaging the marriage.

Marinesko was twice recommended for the Order of the Red Star for the standard of his boat's training in 1944, but received neither award, as his superiors held that decorations should be given only for combat results. He became a full member of the party in August 1944. Once Finland left the war in September 1944, Soviet submarines could again reach the open Baltic, and S-13 sailed from Kronstadt on 1 October for a patrol off the Hel Peninsula. On the night of 9 October, Marinesko attacked a ship he estimated at 5,000 GRT. Three torpedoes fired on the surface from 4 cables missed, as did a fourth, and he then engaged the target with his 100 mm and 45 mm guns, firing 54 rounds, and left believing it was sinking. The ship was the 563 GRT cargo steamer Siegfried, which was holed and had to be beached, with one crewman wounded; she was refloated, repaired, and remained in service until 1954. Because of poor cipher work, S-13 twice took up the wrong patrol area, and she returned to Hanko on 11 November. Her superiors rated the patrol satisfactory, praising the decision to use the gun but criticising the errors in calculating the target's course and speed that caused the misses, and the lack of persistence in hunting targets detected by hydrophone. A Baltic Fleet staff review listed S-13 among boats whose commanders had "acted exceptionally passively" on their first patrols. Marinesko was nevertheless awarded the Order of the Red Banner in November 1944.

=== Disciplinary case (1944–1945) ===
While S-13 was refitting in Finland in late 1944, Marinesko was involved in a series of disciplinary incidents. On 11 December, drunk, he spent the night in his cabin aboard the depot ship Irtysh with a Finnish woman from the crew of a Finnish tanker. The following night, again drunk, he entered the cabin of a female doctor and struck the head of the medical service, who had asked him to leave. Political reports noted that he neglected his crew, whose own discipline was deteriorating. On 29 December, the brigade's party commission gave him a formal reprimand after he promised to reform.

On 5 January 1945, Marinesko and V. S. Lobanov, commander of the depot ship Smolny, went absent without leave in Hanko. Marinesko later claimed to have spent two days with a Swedish restaurant owner, but documents show that the two officers had been drinking with a Finnish woman who had recently been dismissed as a cleaner aboard Smolny. The Baltic Fleet command decided to remove both officers and try them before a military tribunal; under the RSFSR Criminal Code then in force, unauthorised absence in wartime counted as desertion and could carry the death penalty. Lobanov was sentenced to five years in the camps, commuted to service in a penal battalion, but was left in command of his ship because of a shortage of officers. Marinesko asked to be allowed to atone in battle, and the fleet commander, Vladimir Tributs, deferred his trial until after the next patrol, whose results would be taken into account, not least because a replacement commander for S-13 could not quickly be found. As a result, S-13 has been described as the only "penal" submarine in the Soviet Navy. The story that Tributs relented after the crew refused to sail with any other commander is not supported by documents.

=== Patrol of January–February 1945 ===
S-13 sailed on 11 January 1945 and, two days later, reached a patrol area across the westbound routes from the Bay of Danzig. In the second half of January, the Germans began Operation Hannibal, the seaborne evacuation of the population of East Prussia, while also withdrawing eight divisions from the Courland bridgehead, evacuating the garrison of Memel, and moving damaged and unfinished warships, U-boat training flotillas, and auxiliary vessels westward from Königsberg and Pillau. There were too few escorts for this traffic, and many ships sailed lightly escorted or alone. The many German U-boats in the area also worked in S-13's favour: German ships that sighted a submarine often challenged it with recognition signals instead of opening fire, giving it time to escape. Between 21 and 29 January, Marinesko made several contacts but did not attack, either because escorts challenged him or because he could not reach a firing position; on 29 January, the "transport" that fired on him with an automatic cannon was in fact the U-boat U-539.

==== Sinking of Wilhelm Gustloff ====
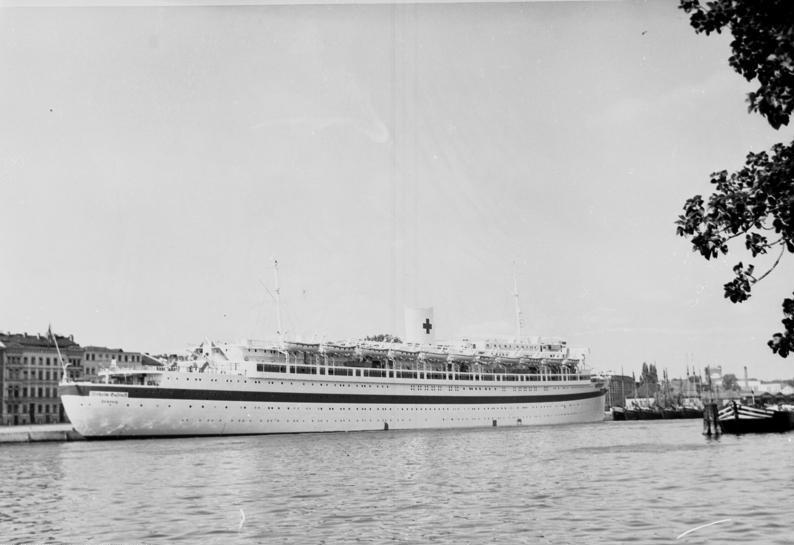
MV Wilhelm Gustloff

Track of S-13 during the attack on Wilhelm Gustloff, 30 January 1945

On 30 January, S-13 sank the former liner Wilhelm Gustloff (25,484 GRT), then serving as an accommodation ship for the Kriegsmarine's 2nd Submarine Training Division. The ship had left Gotenhafen escorted by the torpedo boat Löwe, and S-13, on the surface, sighted her at 21:10. Wilhelm Gustloff was steering a straight course at constant speed, without zigzagging and with her navigation lights on; Löwe had fallen behind, and her sonar had been put out of action by ice; wind and sea were moderate (force 3–4). Marinesko was unable to determine the target's course and speed in time to attack on converging courses, and the liner passed S-13 before the submarine came within torpedo range. At 21:55, he turned onto a parallel course and, at 18 kn (33 km/h; 21 mph) against the liner's 12–15, slowly overtook her. At 23:05, he turned in to attack, and four minutes later he fired three torpedoes from his bow tubes at a range of 4.5 cables. All three hit. At 23:10, seeing the searchlight of the approaching Löwe, he dived and slowly withdrew.

At midnight, the heavy cruiser Admiral Hipper and the torpedo boat T36 arrived. T36 made sonar contact with S-13, and Admiral Hipper, fearing a submarine attack, left for the west without joining the rescue. Wilhelm Gustloff sank at 00:10 on 31 January. At 00:47, reacting to a false sonar contact, T36 dropped twelve depth charges far from S-13, which continued to withdraw submerged.

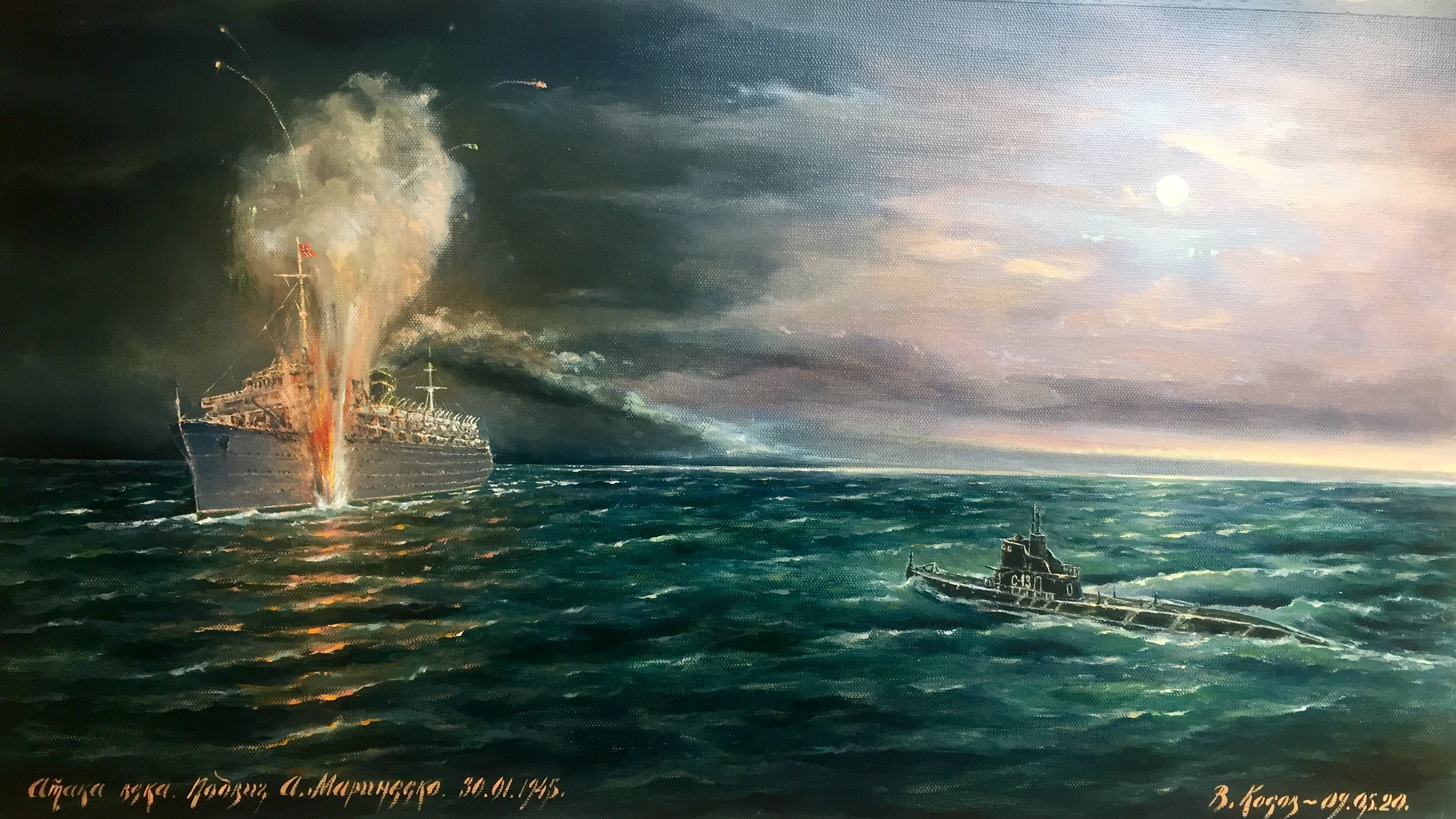
Attack of the century. Death of Wilhelm Gustloff. Vladimir Kosov

Wilhelm Gustloff was the largest ship sunk by a Soviet submarine, or by the Soviet Navy as a whole. The number of people aboard is disputed because of uncertainty over how many refugees embarked. According to a radio message sent shortly before departure and to German documents, she carried 4,922 people: 918 officers, non-commissioned officers, and trainees of the 2nd Submarine Training Division, 173 crew, 373 women naval auxiliaries, 73 badly wounded servicemen, and 3,385 refugees, mostly elderly people, women, and children. Heinz Schön, a member of the crew who survived the sinking, estimated that a further 89 wounded and 500–600 refugees boarded after the message was sent, bringing the total to about 5,600. A figure of 10,582, based on the account of Waldemar Terres, a medical officer cadet who registered those coming aboard, is not supported by documents. Of 1,252 people rescued, 13 soon died of hypothermia; the 1,239 survivors included 528 of the division's submariners, 83 crew, 123 auxiliaries, 86 wounded, and 419 refugees. Between 3,700 and 9,300 people died, the great majority of them refugees. The naval historian Miroslav Morozov regards Wilhelm Gustloff, an armed naval vessel on which refugees had been allowed to embark, as a legitimate military target.

==== Sinking of Steuben ====
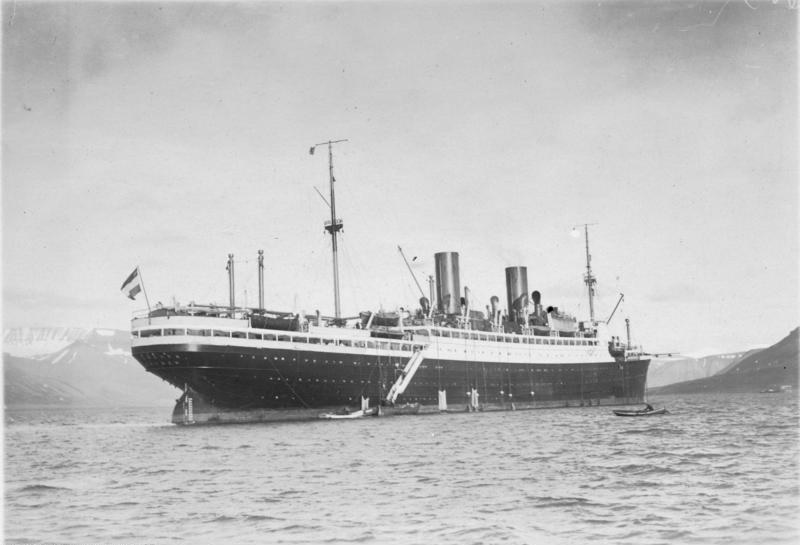
SS General von Steuben

Track of S-13 during the attack on Steuben, 9–10 February 1945

Over the next ten days, Marinesko made several further contacts without attacking. On 3 February, he encountered the light cruiser Emden, which was carrying the coffin of Field Marshal Paul von Hindenburg from Pillau to Kiel, but he took her for a group of destroyers and patrol ships and broke off when her escort challenged him. On 6 February, he evaded the training U-boat U-1303 at a distance that German records put at only 100 m.

Late on 9 February, S-13 detected by hydrophone what Marinesko took to be Emden escorted by three torpedo boats. It was in fact the transport for wounded Steuben (14,660 GRT), formerly the liner General von Steuben, escorted by the old torpedo boat T196 and the torpedo recovery vessel TS 1. Unlike Wilhelm Gustloff, Steuben was escorted by warships, darkened except for her stern light, and steaming at 16 kn (30 km/h; 18 mph) on changing courses. Marinesko pursued her for more than four hours, much of the time without seeing her and tracking her by hydrophone, which obliged him to slow down periodically to listen. At 02:50 on 10 February, he fired two torpedoes from his stern tubes at a range of 12 cables. One hit, and the ship sank. The Germans did not detect S-13 and believed Steuben had struck a mine. About 4,200 people were aboard, among them 2,680 wounded servicemen, 800–900 refugees, 270 military medical personnel, and 12 Red Cross nurses; between 658 and 749 were rescued. Morozov likewise considers Steuben, which was armed and escorted by warships, a legitimate military target.

==== Return and awards ====
Short of fuel, S-13 left her patrol area on 13 February and reached Turku two days later. During the patrol, she had made twelve contacts and two torpedo attacks, both successful, while more than 100 enemy ships passed through her area, most of them undetected. Swedish and Finnish press reports soon told the Soviet command which liner had been sunk, and the sinking was regarded as a major success; the tribunal case against Marinesko was dropped. On 20 February, his divisional commander, Aleksandr Oryol, recommended him for the title of Hero of the Soviet Union, but the acting brigade commander, Lev Kurnikov, reduced the award to the Order of the Red Banner and lowered the crew's awards by one grade, probably in view of Marinesko's disciplinary record. Documents also indicate that the higher award was deferred until after the next patrol rather than refused. S-13 herself was awarded the Order of the Red Banner in March 1945.

=== Final patrol ===
S-13 sailed on her last wartime patrol on 20 April 1945, with Rear Admiral Andrey Stetsenko, head of the submarine department of the Baltic Fleet staff, aboard. Her successive patrol areas, near the Stolpe Bank, off Libau and Windau, and south of Bornholm, lay across the routes of the mass evacuation of German troops from Courland and the Danzig area; on 8–9 May alone, six convoys of 139 vessels carried more than 25,000 troops out of Libau and Windau. Although S-13 made repeated contacts with transports and convoys, she made no attacks. On 24 April, an attack failed when Marinesko could not open the upper conning-tower hatch after surfacing; on other occasions, he broke off, altered course to avoid convoys, or failed to close the target. He reported a series of attacks on S-13 by German U-boats, including one salvo of nine torpedoes, more than any U-boat could fire at once, but German records show that U-boat operations in the eastern Baltic had ended in mid-March 1945. On 19 May, he left his patrol area without orders and moved north to the waters between Öland and Gotland; recalled on 21 May, S-13 reached Turku on 23 May.

The fleet command rated the patrol unsatisfactory. Oryol and Kurnikov attributed the failed attacks between 26 April and 2 May to Marinesko's incorrect, indecisive, and "incomprehensible" manoeuvring, and Kurnikov concluded that instead of seeking out the enemy, Marinesko's conduct had amounted to "evading enemy convoys and transports". Marinesko declined to discuss the patrol after the war. Kron suggested that a conflict with Stetsenko might have affected his conduct; no documentary evidence of such a conflict has been found. Morozov notes that Stetsenko had signed Marinesko's 1942 recommendation for the Order of Lenin, that Marinesko received no serious penalties while Stetsenko commanded the brigade, and that a brigade veteran described their relations as good.

=== Combat record ===
Under Marinesko's command, M-96 and S-13 made six war patrols: five against shipping and one to land a reconnaissance party. He made five torpedo attacks (four on the surface, one submerged) on four ships, firing ten torpedoes, of which four hit, sinking Wilhelm Gustloff (25,484 GRT) and Steuben (14,660 GRT); a gun attack damaged Siegfried (563 GRT). His total of 40,144 GRT sunk is the highest of any Soviet submarine commander; by number of ships sunk, nine other Baltic Fleet submarine commanders had more confirmed sinkings.

== Dismissal from the navy ==
Further disciplinary breaches followed the end of the war. He went absent without leave in Turku on 26 and 30 May 1945, and his award recommendation was withdrawn. On 31 May, Oryol reported that Marinesko was drinking constantly, including aboard the submarine, and neglecting his duties; that he could no longer command S-13; and that he should either be treated for alcoholism or discharged. On 24 June, he was given four days' arrest after a drunken fight with Lobanov. After S-13 moved to Liepāja on 10 July, the drinking, unauthorised absences, and neglect of the crew continued, and his systematic alcohol abuse led to several epileptic seizures.

In early August 1945, Marinesko was relieved of command of S-13. Tributs proposed keeping him in the navy at a lower rank as commander of a minesweeper, and, on 14 September, Kuznetsov ordered him removed from his post and demoted to senior lieutenant for "negligent attitude to his duties, systematic drunkenness, and dissolute behaviour". Marinesko later claimed to have obtained a personal meeting with Kuznetsov, which is undocumented and was denied by Kuznetsov. Appointed to command the minesweeper T-34 on 18 October, he was discharged to the reserve at his own request on 20 November, after Vice Admiral Pavel Abankin, the deputy people's commissar for personnel, refused his request to return to submarines. That autumn, he left his first wife for a woman he had met during the siege of Leningrad.

== Later life ==
In January 1946, Marinesko joined the Baltic State Shipping Company, concealing his demotion, and served as chief mate and second mate on several steamers. He was repeatedly transferred to the reserve on reduced pay for disciplinary offences, once for two months for going on watch heavily drunk, and was demoted to second mate after failing recertification. He left the company in August 1948. He told Kron that he had resigned because of failing eyesight, but documents show that he resigned after being appointed chief mate of the liner Admiral Nakhimov, which was laid up for lengthy repairs.

From October 1948, Marinesko was deputy director for administration of the Leningrad Blood Transfusion Research Institute. On 14 December 1949, he was sentenced to three years' imprisonment for abuse of office: he had taken two tonnes of peat briquettes, which were found during a search of his flat; sold as scrap 240 kg of horsehair intended for insulating the institute, and spent the proceeds on New Year celebrations; and appropriated a bed belonging to the institute. He was also convicted under the decree of 26 June 1940 for two days' unexcused absence from work, which was then a criminal offence. He served his sentence in a Dalstroy labour camp at Vanino and was released early for good behaviour on 10 October 1951, after which he worked for a year as a topographer with a geophysical expedition. He was not expelled from the party.

His conviction was expunged on 27 March 1953 under the amnesty that followed Stalin's death. From June 1953 until his death, he worked at the Mezon radio-components factory in Leningrad, latterly in its supply department, where he received severe reprimands for absences caused by drinking. From October to December 1953, he completed a reserve training period as understudy commander of the submarine S-20. In Morozov's view, this was an attempt to return to the navy, aided by his former commander Yunakov, then chief of staff of the 17th Submarine Division. It failed: the brigade commander, Rear Admiral N. I. Morozov, assessed him as poorly prepared, noted drinking with former colleagues, and judged him unfit to command a submarine.

On 26 November 1960, after efforts by his friends, the Minister of Defence rescinded the 1945 orders on Marinesko's removal, demotion, and discharge. His rank of captain 3rd rank was restored, and his discharge was recorded as due to staff reductions, although his pension was unchanged. In 1962, an audit at his workplace found that, over nine years, he had submitted 15 forged certificates in order to receive a full pension, and, in April, he was given a two-year suspended sentence and ordered to repay the money. With child support, court-ordered support for his elderly mother, and these repayments taking about 70 per cent of his wages and pension, he was left in severe financial difficulty. Late in 1962, he was diagnosed with oesophageal cancer; after an appeal from Kron, Admiral of the Fleet Ivan Isakov sent him 100 rubles a month. Marinesko died in Leningrad on 25 November 1963 and was buried in the Bogoslovskoe Cemetery.

== Posthumous recognition ==
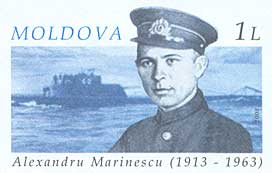
Alexander Marinesko on a Moldovan stamp

At the first reunion of Baltic Fleet submarine veterans, held in Kronstadt on 29 May 1959, figures on actual German losses published in the West German journal Marine-Rundschau were presented for the first time. They showed that Soviet submarines had sunk only three ships of more than 10,000 tons, two of them Marinesko's. In the summer of 1960, Marinesko befriended the writer Alexander Kron, who recorded their conversations; Kron's article about him in Literaturnaya Gazeta that year brought Marinesko to public attention, and an episode of the television series Podvig (Feat) in October 1963 made him more widely known.

In 1965, Isakov described the sinkings of both liners in the magazine Sovetsky Soyuz. Before his death in 1967, Isakov passed his material to Kuznetsov, whose 1968 article in Neva praised Marinesko's combat record while acknowledging his disciplinary problems. Kron's book about Marinesko, Kapitan dalnego plavaniya (Master Mariner), was published posthumously in 1984. In 1986, sailors at the Liepāja submarine base paid for a monument dedicated "to the heroic crew of the Red Banner submarine S-13 and its combat commander A. I. Marinesko"; within two weeks his name and the word "heroic" were removed. The incident prompted Izvestia to publish seven articles about Marinesko over two years, which were answered by critical pieces in the Baltic Fleet newspaper Strazh Baltiki.

In 1987, the Union of Soviet Writers was among the organisations calling for Marinesko to be made a Hero of the Soviet Union. On 27 April 1988, a court quashed his 1949 conviction for lack of a criminal offence, which his supporters believed removed the obstacle to the award; the public did not know of his second conviction, of 1962, which was recorded in his military registration file. A Committee in Defence of Marinesko, founded in Leningrad in late 1989, collected more than 40,000 signatures. On 5 May 1990, following appeals from public organisations and veterans supported by the Ministry of Defence, President Mikhail Gorbachev posthumously conferred on Marinesko the title of Hero of the Soviet Union.

== Personal life ==
Marinesko was married twice. His first marriage, to Nina Ilyinichna Karyukhina, lasted from November 1932 to the autumn of 1945; their daughter Leonora (1933–2018) was born in October 1933. His second marriage, to Valentina Ivanovna Gromova, lasted from March 1947 to the spring of 1962; their daughter Tatyana (1953–2017) was born in August 1953. From 1962 until his death, he lived with Valentina Aleksandrovna Filimonova, without formally marrying.

== Awards ==
Marinesko received the following awards:

- Hero of the Soviet Union (5 May 1990, posthumously; Gold Star medal No. 11617)
- Order of Lenin, twice (3 September 1942; 5 May 1990)
- Order of the Red Banner, twice (21 November 1944; 13 March 1945)
- Medal "For Battle Merit" (3 November 1944, for long service)
- Medal "For the Defence of Leningrad"
- Medal "For the Capture of Königsberg" (Note: This award is recorded in only one document; the Podvig Naroda archive database contains no documents confirming it.)
- Medal "For the Victory over Germany in the Great Patriotic War 1941–1945"

== Legacy ==
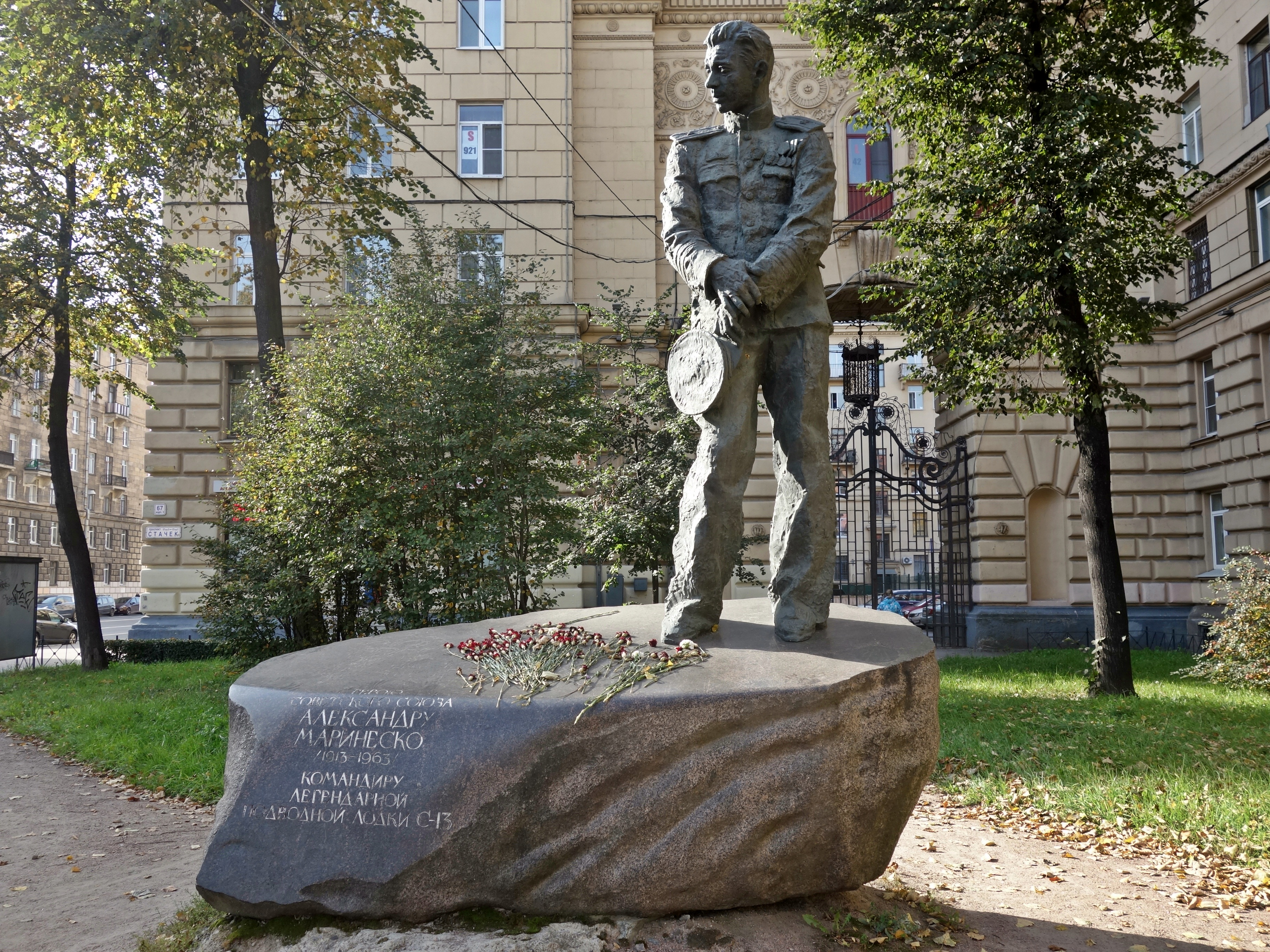
Monument to Alexander Marinesko in St. Petersburg

Monuments to Marinesko stand in Kronstadt (moved there in 1995 from Liepāja, where it was unveiled in 1986), Saint Petersburg (a bust unveiled in 1990 and a monument erected in 2013), Odesa (1999), Kaliningrad (2001), Mikhaylovsk (2018), Sevastopol (a bust at School No. 61, 2019), Chișinău (2021), and Lokhvytsia.

Soviet and Russian popular works have called the sinking of Wilhelm Gustloff the "attack of the century" and Marinesko "Submariner No. 1". Books about him include documentary narratives such as Kron's Kapitan dalnego plavaniya, several books by V. S. Gemanov, and N. N. Titorenko's Lichny vrag Adolfa Gitlera (Adolf Hitler's Personal Enemy). Historical studies include the documentary study by Morozov and co-authors, and Aleksandr Ivanovich Marinesko: Pravda i vymysel (Truth and Fiction) by Vitaly Dotsenko, S. I. Makarov, and V. N. Shcherbakov. Episodes from his life were used in the feature films O vozvrashchenii zabyt (1985) and Pervyy posle Boga (2005).

His sinking of the Wilhelm Gustloff has been described as "the worst maritime disaster of all time", but not necessarily a war crime.
