= MV Wilhelm Gustloff =

German military transport ship which sank in 1945; former cruise ship

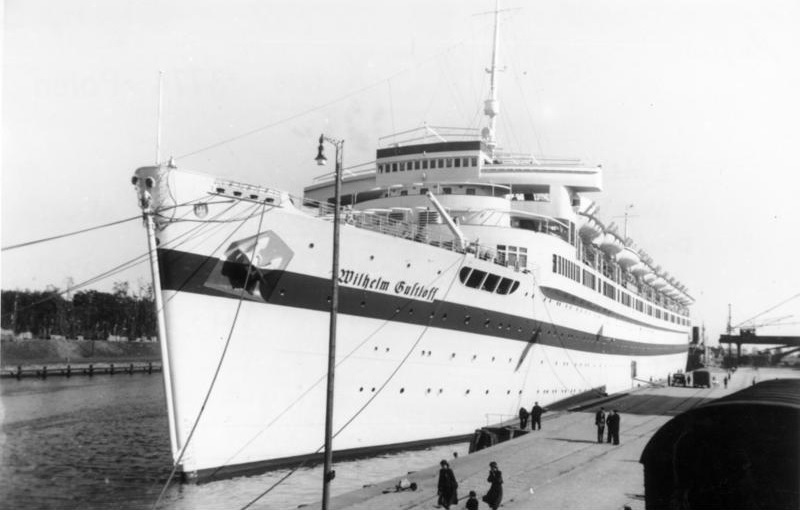
- Wilhelm Gustloff as a hospital ship, before being converted into an armed military transport. Docked in Danzig, 23 September 1939.

History

Germany
- Name: Wilhelm Gustloff
- Namesake: Wilhelm Gustloff
- Owner: German Labour Front (Deutsche Arbeitsfront)
- Operator: Hamburg Süd
- Port of registry: Hamburg, Germany
- Builder: Blohm & Voss
- Cost: 25 million ℛ︁ℳ︁
- Yard number: 511
- Laid down: 1 August 1936
- Launched: 5 May 1937
- Completed: 15 March 1938
- Maiden voyage: 24 March 1938
- In service: 1938–1939
- Out of service: 1 September 1939
- Identification: Radio ID (DJVZ)
- Fate: Requisitioned into the Kriegsmarine on 1 September 1939

Germany
- Name: Lazarettschiff D (Hospital Ship D)
- Operator: Kriegsmarine (German navy)
- Acquired: 1 September 1939
- In service: 1939–1940
- Out of service: 20 November 1940
- Notes: Converted to floating barracks beginning 20 November 1940, including repainting from hospital ship colours to standard navy grey

Germany
- Name: Wilhelm Gustloff
- Operator: Kriegsmarine
- Acquired: 20 November 1940
- In service: 1940–1945
- Out of service: 30 January 1945
- Fate: Torpedoed and sunk on 30 January 1945 by Soviet submarine S-13
- Notes: Used as floating barracks for the Second Submarine Training Division until the vessel returned to active service ferrying civilians and military personnel as part of Operation Hannibal

General characteristics
- Class & type: Cruise ship
- Tonnage: 25,484 GRT
- Length: 208.5 m (684 ft 1 in)
- Beam: 23.59 m (77 ft 5 in)
- Height: 56 m (183 ft 9 in) (From Keel to Masthead)
- Draught: 6.5 m (21 ft 4 in)
- Decks: 5
- Installed power: 9,500 hp (7,100 kW)
- Propulsion: 4 × 8-cylinder MAN diesel engines; 2 × 4-blade propellers
- Speed: 15.5 kn (28.7 km/h; 17.8 mph)
- Range: 12,000 nmi (22,000 km) at 15 kn (28 km/h; 17 mph)
- Capacity: 1,465 passengers (as designed) in 489 cabins
- Crew: 417 cruise ship; 20 officers, 145 enlisted (naval)
- Armament: 3 × 105 mm (4.1 in) anti-aircraft guns; 8 × 20 mm (0.79 in) anti-aircraft cannons

MV Wilhelm Gustloff was a German military transport ship, which was taking part in Operation Hannibal, when it was sunk by Soviet submarine S-13 in the Baltic Sea on 30 January 1945. At the time, it was evacuating civilians and German military personnel from East Prussia and the occupied Baltic states, and German military personnel from Gotenhafen (Gdynia). By one estimate, 9,343 people died, making its sinking the deadliest maritime disaster in modern history.

Originally constructed as a cruise ship for the Nazi Strength Through Joy (Kraft durch Freude) organization in 1937, Wilhelm Gustloff was requisitioned by the Kriegsmarine (German navy) in 1939. She served as a hospital ship from 1939 to 1940, and then as a floating barracks for naval personnel in Gotenhafen until 1945, when she was fitted with anti-aircraft guns and used to transport evacuees.

== Construction and naming ==
Wilhelm Gustloff was the first purpose-built cruise ship for the German Labour Front (Deutsche Arbeitsfront, DAF) and used by subsidiary organisation Strength Through Joy (Kraft durch Freude, KdF). She was designed to provide recreational and cultural activities for German functionaries and workers, including concerts, cruises, and other holiday trips, and to serve as a public relations tool that would present "a more acceptable image of the Reich".

The ship was constructed by the Blohm & Voss shipyards. Measuring 208.5 m (684 ft 1 in) long by 23.59 m (77 ft 5 in) wide, with a capacity of 25,484 gross register tons (GRT), she was launched on 5 May 1937.

Originally intended to be named Adolf Hitler, the ship was instead named after Wilhelm Gustloff, leader of the Nazi Party's Swiss branch, who had been assassinated by a Jewish medical student in 1936. Hitler himself decided on the name change after sitting next to Gustloff's widow during his memorial service. After completing sea trials in the North Sea from 15 to 16 March 1938, she was handed over to the Strength Through Joy organisation.

== Use as cruise ship ==
The ship made her unofficial maiden voyage between 24 and 27 March 1938 carrying Austrians in an attempt to convince them to vote for the annexation of Austria by Germany. On 29 March she departed on her second voyage carrying workers and their families from the Blohm & Voss shipyard on a three-day cruise.

=== Rescue of Pegaway ===
For her third voyage, Wilhelm Gustloff left Hamburg on 1 April 1938 under the command of Carl Lübbe to join the KdF ships Der Deutsche, Oceania and Sierra Cordoba on a group cruise of the North Sea. A storm developed on 3 April with winds up to 100 kilometres per hour (55 knots) that forced the four ships apart. Meanwhile, the 1,836 gross ton British coal freighter Pegaway, which had departed Tyne on 2 April for Hamburg, was also caught up in the storm. Cargo and machinery were washed from Pegaway's decks and the ship soon lost maneuverability. By 4 April, it was taking on water and slowly sinking.

At 4 am, Captain G. W. Ward of Pegaway issued an SOS when the ship was 20 nautical miles (37 km) northwest of the island of Terschelling, off the coast of the Netherlands. The closest of the ships that answered the distress call was Wilhelm Gustloff, which reached Pegaway at 6 am. She launched her Lifeboat No. 1, with a crew of twelve under the command of Second Officer Meyer. The oar-powered lifeboat was unable to come aside Pegaway in the heavy seas and looked in danger of needing to be rescued itself. Lifeboat No. 6, with a crew of ten under the command of Third Officer Schürmann, was then lowered. As it was motor-powered, it was better able to handle the waves.

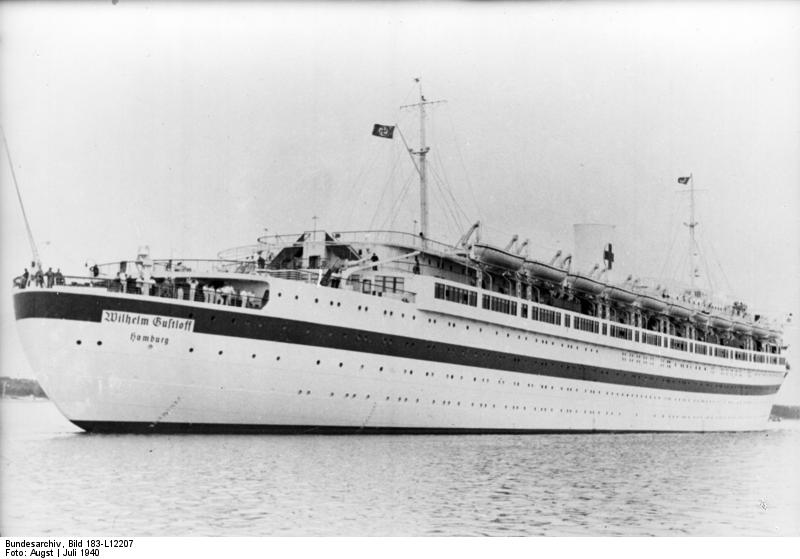
Wilhelm Gustloff, 1940

After first assisting their shipmates in Lifeboat No. 1 to head back towards Wilhelm Gustloff, Schürmann was able to reach Pegaway. One by one, the 19 men on Pegaway jumped into the sea and were hauled onto Lifeboat No. 6, with both them and the crew of the lifeboat back at Wilhelm Gustloff by 7:45 am. A Dutch tugboat soon arrived but was unable to save Pegaway, which soon rolled to port and sank. Lifeboat No. 1 had been so badly damaged by the waves that after its crew had climbed up via ladders to the safety of their ship that it was set adrift, to later be washed up on the shores of Terschelling on 2 May.

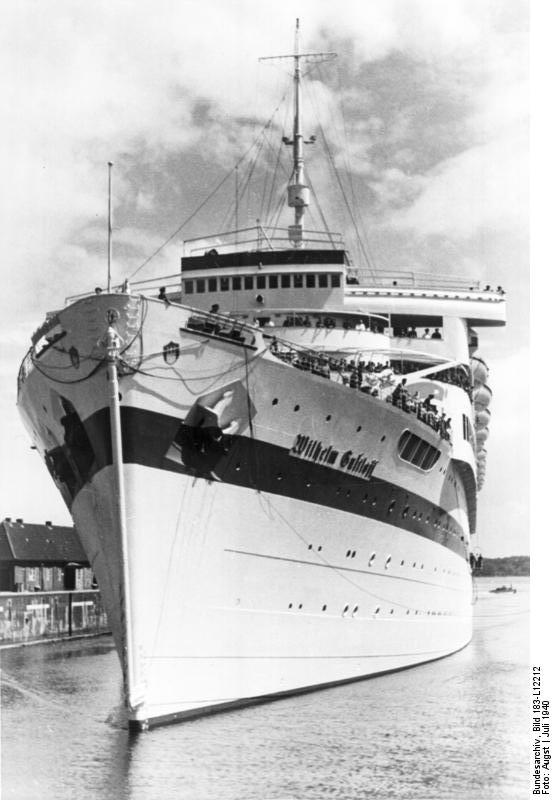
Wilhelm Gustloff, 1940

=== Anschluss and further civilian usage ===
On 8 April 1938 Wilhelm Gustloff departed Hamburg for England, where she anchored over 5.6 kilometres (3 nmi) offshore from Tilbury so as to remain in international waters. This allowed her to act as a floating polling station for German and Austrian citizens living in England who wished to vote on the approaching plebiscite on Germany's unification with Austria. During 10 April, 1,172 Germans and 806 Austrians were carried from the docks at Tilbury to the ship where 1,968 votes were cast in favour of the union and ten against. Once the voting was complete, Wilhelm Gustloff left Tilbury, reaching Hamburg on 12 April.

After undertaking a further voyage on 14 to 19 April 1938, the ship went on an Osterfahrt (Easter Voyage) before her actual official maiden voyage, which was undertaken from 21 April to 6 May 1938, when she joined Der Deutsche, Oceania and Sierra Cordoba on a group cruise to the Madeira Islands. On the second day of her voyage, the 58-year-old Captain Lübbe died on the bridge from a heart attack. He was replaced by First Officer Friedrich Petersen, who commanded Wilhelm Gustloff for the remainder of the cruise. Petersen relinquished his command; he would later serve as captain on the ship's final voyage.

Wilhelm Gustloff remained as flagship of the KdF cruise fleet, her last civilian role, until the spring of 1939, when all large ships were requisitioned for wartime use. From 14 March 1938 until 26 August 1939, the ship had carried over 80,000 passengers on a total of 60 voyages.

=== Condor Legion ===
Between 20 May and 2 June 1939, Wilhelm Gustloff was temporarily repurposed by the German navy. Along with seven other ships in the KdF fleet, she transported the Condor Legion back to Germany from Spain following the victory of the Nationalist forces under General Francisco Franco in the Spanish Civil War.

== Military career ==
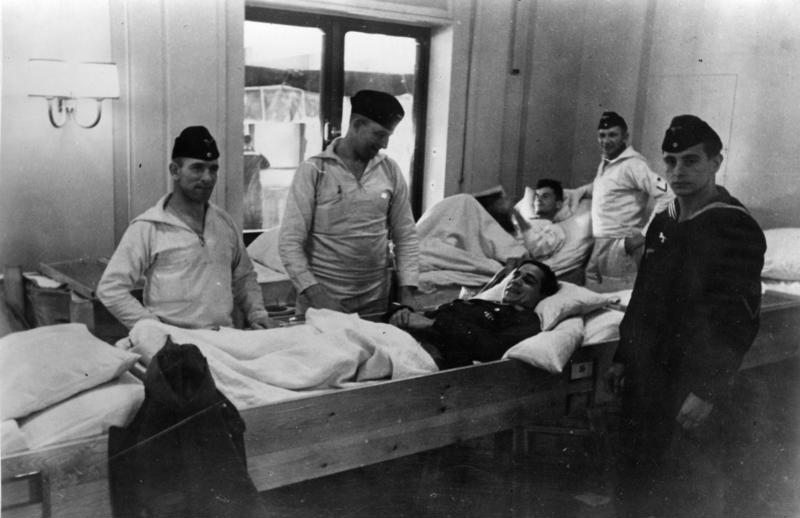
German soldiers wounded at Narvik being transported to Germany on Wilhelm Gustloff in July 1940

From September 1939 to November 1940, Wilhelm Gustloff served as a hospital ship, officially designated Lazarettschiff D.

On 20 November 1940, medical equipment was removed from the ship, and she was repainted from the hospital ship colors of white with a green stripe to standard naval grey. As a consequence of the Allied blockade of the German coastline, she was used as a barracks ship for approximately 1,000 U-boat trainees of the 2nd Submarine Training Division (2. Unterseeboot-Lehrdivision) in the port of Gdynia, which had been occupied by Germany and renamed Gotenhafen, located near Danzig (Gdańsk). Wilhelm Gustloff sat in dock there for over four years.

In 1942, SS Cap Arcona was used as a stand-in for RMS Titanic in the German film version of the disaster. Filmed in Gotenhafen, the 2nd Submarine Training Division acted as extras in the movie. Wilhelm Gustloff continued to serve as a barracks until 1945, when she was hastily repurposed for Operation Hannibal.

== Operation Hannibal – evacuation ==
Operation Hannibal was the naval evacuation of German troops and civilians from East Prussia and the German-occupied Baltic states as the Red Army advanced from the east. Wilhelm Gustloff's final voyage was to evacuate civilians, German military personnel, and technicians from Courland, East Prussia, and Danzig-West Prussia. Many had worked at advanced weapon bases in the Baltic from Gotenhafen to Kiel.

The ship's complement and passenger lists cited 6,050 people on board, but these did not include the many individuals who boarded the ship without being listed in the official embarkation records. Heinz Schön, a German archivist and Gustloff survivor, researched the sinking during the 1980s and 1990s. He concluded that the ship was carrying a crew of 173 (naval armed forces auxiliaries); 918 officers, NCOs, and men of the 2nd Submarine Training Division; 373 female naval auxiliary helpers; 162 wounded soldiers; and 8,956 civilians, for a total of 10,582 passengers and crew. The passengers, besides civilians, included Gestapo personnel, members of the Organisation Todt, and Nazi officials with their families. The ship was overcrowded, and due to the high temperature and humidity inside, many passengers defied orders not to remove their life jackets. Besides ethnic Germans, the people on board included Lithuanians, Latvians, Poles, Estonians, and Croatians, some of whom had been victims of Nazi aggression.

The ship left Gotenhafen at 12:30 pm on 30 January 1945, accompanied by two torpedo boats and another evacuation transport, Hansa. Hansa and one torpedo boat were soon disabled by mechanical problems, leaving Wilhelm Gustloff with just one torpedo boat escort, Löwe (ex-Gyller). The ship had four captains on board (the Wilhelm Gustloff's captain, two merchant marine captains, and the captain of the U-boat complement housed on the vessel); this resulted in heated arguments about how to guard the ship against Soviet submarines. Against the advice of the U-boat commander, Lieutenant Commander Wilhelm Zahn (an experienced submariner who argued for a course in shallow waters close to shore and without lights), Wilhelm Gustloff's captain, Friedrich Petersen, turned the ship into deep waters. Upon being informed by radio of an oncoming German minesweeper convoy, Petersen ordered that the ship's red and green navigation lights should be turned on so as to avoid a collision in the dark, making Wilhelm Gustloff easy to spot.

As Wilhelm Gustloff had been fitted with anti-aircraft guns, and the Germans did not mark her as a hospital ship, no notification of her operating in a hospital capacity had been given. Since she was transporting military personnel, she did not have any protection as a hospital ship under international accords.

=== Sinking ===
Wilhelm Gustloff was soon sighted by the Soviet submarine S-13, under the command of Captain Alexander Marinesko. The submarine sensor on board the escorting torpedo boat had frozen, rendering it inoperable, as had her anti-aircraft guns, leaving the vessels defenseless. Marinesko followed the ships to their starboard (seaward) side for two hours before making a move, surfacing his submarine and steering it around Wilhelm Gustloff's stern, to attack it from the port side closer to shore, from where the attack would be less expected. At around 9:00 pm (CET), Marinesko ordered his crew to launch four torpedoes at Wilhelm Gustloff's port side, about 30 km (16 nmi; 19 mi) offshore, between Großendorf and Leba.

The three torpedoes that were fired successfully all struck Wilhelm Gustloff on her port side. The first struck the ship's bow; this caused the ship's watertight doors to lock before the sleeping off-duty crew could escape. The second hit the accommodations for the women's naval auxiliary, located in the ship's drained swimming pool. It dislodged the pool tiles at high velocity, which caused high casualties; only three of the 373 women quartered there survived. The third torpedo scored a direct hit on the engine room located amidships, disabling all power and communications.

Reportedly, only nine lifeboats could be lowered; the rest had frozen in their davits and had to be freed with tools. About twenty minutes after the torpedoes' impact, Wilhelm Gustloff suddenly listed so dramatically to port that the lifeboats lowered on the high starboard side crashed into the ship's tilting side, sending their occupants into the sea.

Many deaths were caused either directly by the torpedoes or by drowning in the inrushing water. Some fatalities were due to the initial stampede caused by panicked passengers on the stairs and decks, while others were caused by passengers jumping overboard into freezing waters. The water temperature in the Baltic Sea in late January is usually around 4 °C (39 °F); however, this was a particularly cold night, with an air temperature of −10 to −18 °C (14 to 0 °F) and ice floes covering the surface. The majority of those who died were victims of hypothermia.

Less than forty minutes after being struck, Wilhelm Gustloff was lying on her side. She sank bow-first ten minutes later, in 44 m (144 ft) of water.

German forces were able to rescue 1,252 people: the torpedo boat T36 rescued 564; the torpedo boat Löwe, 472; the minesweeper M387, 98; the minesweeper M375, 43; the minesweeper M341, 37; the steamer Göttingen, 28; the torpedo recovery boat (Torpedofangboot) TF19, 7; the freighter Gotenland, two; and the patrol boat (Vorpostenboot) V1703, one baby. Thirteen of the survivors died later. All four captains on Wilhelm Gustloff survived her sinking; an official naval inquiry was initiated only against Lieutenant Commander Zahn. His degree of responsibility was never resolved, however, because of Nazi Germany's collapse in 1945.

=== Losses ===
The figures from Heinz Schön's research make the loss in the Wilhelm Gustloff sinking to be "9,343 men, women and children". His more recent research is backed up by estimates arrived at by a different method. An Unsolved History episode that aired in March 2003, on the Discovery Channel, undertook a computer analysis of the sinking. Using Maritime Exodus software, it estimated that 9,600 people died of the more than 10,600 on board, by taking into account passenger density based on witness reports, and a simulation of escape routes and survivability with the timeline of the sinking.

== Aftermath ==
Many ships were sunk during the war by the Allies and by the Axis powers. However, based on the latest estimates of passenger numbers and those known to be saved, the sinking of Wilhelm Gustloff remains by far the largest loss of life in maritime history resulting from the sinking of a single vessel.

About 1,000 German naval officers and men were aboard and died in the sinking of Wilhelm Gustloff. Women aboard the ship at the time of the sinking were inaccurately described by Soviet propaganda as "SS personnel from the German concentration camps". There were, however, 373 female naval auxiliaries amongst the passengers, only three of whom survived.

On the night of 9–10 February, just eleven days after the sinking, S-13 sank another German ship, General von Steuben, killing about 4,500 people.

Before sinking Wilhelm Gustloff, Captain Marinesko had been facing a court martial due to his alcohol problems and for being caught in a brothel while he and his crew were off duty. Marinesko was deemed by the Soviet government as "not suitable to be a hero". Instead of being awarded the title Hero of the Soviet Union for the sinking, he was awarded the lesser Order of the Red Banner and downgraded to lieutenant, preventing him from receiving any further commands. He was dishonorably discharged from the Soviet Navy in October 1945.

In 1960, Marinesko was reinstated to his original rank of captain third class and granted a full pension; in 1963, he was given the traditional ceremony due a captain upon the successful return from a mission. He died three weeks later at the age of 50 from cancer. In 1990, Marinesko was posthumously named a Hero of the Soviet Union by Soviet General Secretary Mikhail Gorbachev.

Author Günter Grass, who wrote the 2002 novel Crabwalk about the sinking, said in an interview published by The New York Times in April 2003 that among his many reasons for writing the novel "was to take the subject away from the extreme Right... They said the tragedy of Wilhelm Gustloff was a war crime. It wasn't. It was terrible, but it was a result of war, a terrible result of war."

== Wreckage ==
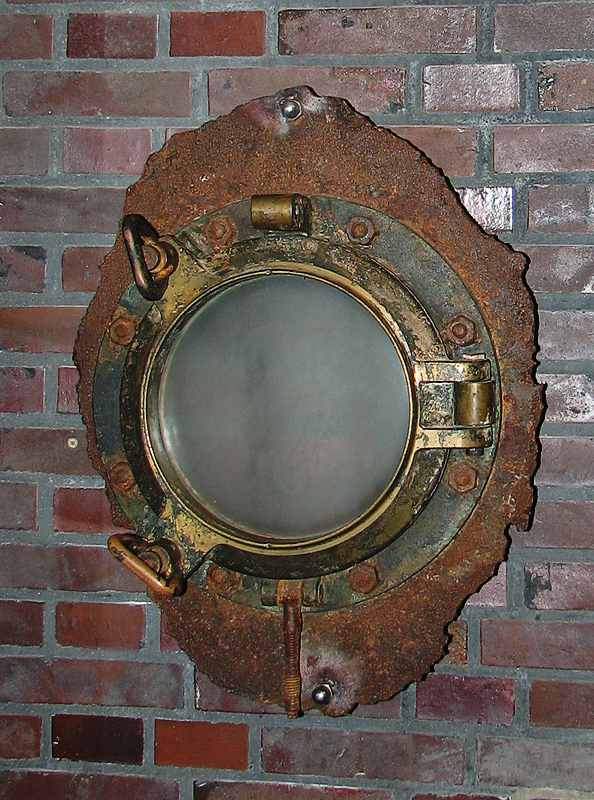
A porthole from Wilhelm Gustloff, salvaged in 1988, at the museum ship Albatros in Damp, Germany in 2000.

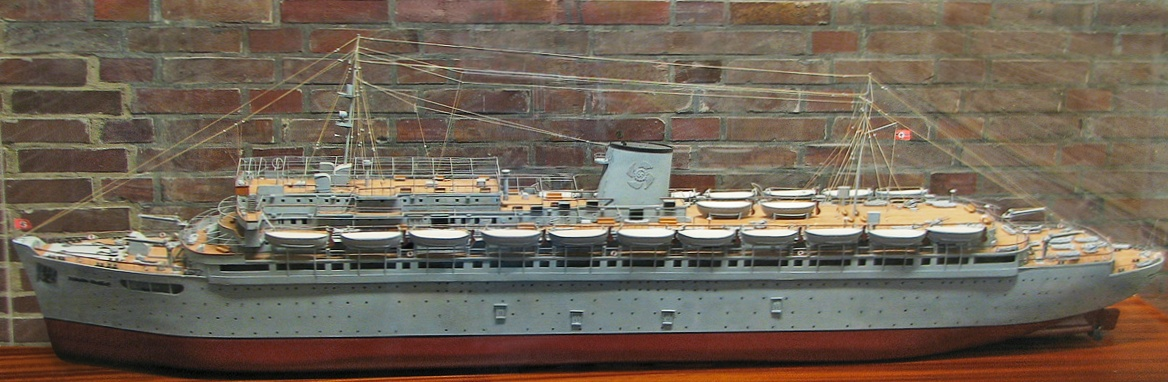
A model of Wilhelm Gustloff at the Laboe Naval Memorial

Wilhelm Gustloff rests at 55°04′22″N 17°25′17″E, about 19 nmi (35 km; 22 mi) offshore, east of Łeba and west of Władysławowo (the former Leba and Großendorf, respectively). It is noted as "Shipwreck" on Polish nautical charts and classified as a war grave. It is one of the largest shipwrecks on the Baltic Sea floor and has attracted much interest from treasure hunters searching for the lost Amber Room. In order to protect the peace of victims of the war grave, as well as the wreck itself and the surrounding environment, the Polish Maritime Office in Gdynia has forbidden diving, anchoring and fishing within a 500 m (1,600 ft) radius of the wreck.

In 2006, a bell recovered from the wreck and subsequently used as a decoration in a Polish seafood restaurant, was lent to the privately funded "Forced Paths" exhibition in Berlin.

== Popular culture ==
- Books:
  - Günter Grass: Im Krebsgang, translated into English as Crabwalk. Combines historical elements, such as the sinking of the Wilhelm Gustloff, with fictional elements, such as the book's major characters and events.
  - Ruta Sepetys: Salt to the Sea. Young Adult historical fiction about the lives of four fictional characters during the evacuation of East Prussia and the sinking of the Wilhelm Gustloff. Carnegie Medal winner (2017).
  - The prologue of Polar Shift features the sinking of the ship while a Resistance fighter trying to smuggle a scientist out of Nazi hands is on board.
  - The novel The Other Side of Silence. London: Quercus, by Philip Kerr, includes in its plot the sinking of MV Wilhelm Gustloff by combining accurate historical facts and fictional characters.
  - Med Ilden I ryggen a Danish book written in 1999, fictional characters relate what it was like on the Wilhelm Gustloff during the sinking.
  - The Cruellest Night: Germany's Dunkirk and the sinking of the Wilhelm Gustloff (1979), by Christopher Dobson, John Miller and Ronald Payne. Publisher Little, Brown and Company.
- Films:
  - Darkness Fell on Gotenhafen (Nacht fiel über Gotenhafen), feature film by Frank Wisbar, 1960
  - Die Gustloff, two-part Television film by Joseph Vilsmaier, 2008
- Documentaries:
  - "Killer Submarine," an episode of History's Mysteries, 1999.
  - Die große Flucht. Der Untergang der Gustloff (The Great Escape. The sinking of Wilhelm Gustloff), 2001.
  - "The Sinking of the Wilhelm Gustloff", The Sea Hunters (television program), 2002.
  - "Wilhelm Gustloff: World's Deadliest Sea Disaster", Unsolved History (television program), 2003.
  - Ghosts of the Baltic Sea, 2006.
  - Sinking Hitler's Supership, 2008. National Geographic documentary using extensive footage from the 2008 German miniseries.
  - Triumph und Tragödie der Wilhelm Gustloff, 2012.

== See also ==
- MV Goya, another ship taking part in Operation Hannibal, was also sunk by a Soviet submarine with just 183 survivors out of 7,000 passengers and crew.
- Soviet hospital ship Armenia, sunk by German aircraft with only 8 survivors out of 5,000–7,000 passengers and crew.
- SS Cap Arcona
- MV Awa Maru
- Iosif Stalin
- Deutschland
- Thielbek
- Lancastria
- RMS Lusitania
- Montevideo Maru
- List by death toll of ships sunk by submarines
- List of maritime disasters
- List of shipwrecks

== Bibliography ==
- Dobson, Christopher; Miller, John; Payne, Ronald (1979). The Cruellest Night. London: Hodder & Stoughton. ISBN 0-340-22720-6.
- Gröner, Erich (1988). Die deutschen Kriegsschiffe 1815–1945 (in German). Vol. V: Hilfsschiffe II: Lazarettschiffe, Wohnschiffe, Schulschiffe, Forschungsfahrzeuge, Hafenbetriebsfahrzeuge. Koblenz: Bernard & Graefe. ISBN 3-7637-4804-0.
- Heath, Tim & Cocolin, Michela; Hitler's Lost State: The Fall of Prussia and the Wilhelm Gustloff Tragedy (Pen and Sword Military, 2020).
- Kappes, Irwin J.; The Greatest Marine Disaster in History...and why you probably never heard of it Archived 28 August 2011 at the Wayback Machine, 2003.
- Leja, Michael; Die letzte Fahrt der "Wilhelm Gustloff"; ZDF (1 August 2005), reports that earlier estimates of approximately 6000 drowned have been revised upwards by more recent sources to about 9300. An article in German.
- Moorehouse, Roger; Ship of Fate: The Story of the MV Wilhelm Gustloff (Independently published, 2018).
- Niven, Bill; "The Good Captain and the Bad Captain: Joseph Vilsmaier's "Die Gustloff" and the Erosion of Complexity" in German Politics & Society Vol. 26, No. 4 (89), Special Issue: Dynamics of Memory in 21st Century Germany (Winter 2008), pp. 82–98.
- Pipes, Jason; A Memorial to the Wilhelm Gustloff.
- Prince, Cathryn J.; Death in the Baltic: The World War II Sinking of the Wilhelm Gustloff (St. Martin's Press, 2013).
- Schön, Heinz; Die Gustloff Katastrophe (Motorbuch Verlag, Stuttgart, 2002).
- Sellwood, A.V.; The Damned Don't Drown (TBS The Book Service Ltd, London, 1974).
- Williams, David; Wartime Disasters at Sea (Patrick Stephens Limited, Nr Yeovil, UK, 1997) ISBN 1-85260-565-0.
