= SS General von Steuben =

German military transport ship; sank 1945, killing thousands

Coordinates: 54°41′N 16°51′E

- SS General von Steuben

History

→ → Germany
- Name: 1923: München; 1930: General von Steuben; 1938: Steuben
- Namesake: 1922: Munich; 1930: Friedrich Wilhelm von Steuben
- Owner: Norddeutscher Lloyd
- Port of registry: Bremen
- Ordered: 9 September 1920
- Builder: AG Vulcan Stettin, Germany
- Yard number: 669
- Laid down: 1 October 1921
- Launched: 25 November 1922
- Completed: 26 March 1923
- Maiden voyage: 21 June 1923
- Refit: 1930–31
- Identification: 1923-1935: code letters QLSR; 1935-on: call sign DOAQ
- Fate: Sunk by Soviet submarine S-13, 10 February 1945

General characteristics
- Type: Ocean liner
- Tonnage: 14,660 GRT, 8,385 NRT (1930 refit)
- Length: 546.5 ft (166.6 m)
- Beam: 65.0 ft (19.8 m)
- Depth: 43.7 ft (13.3 m)
- Decks: 4
- Installed power: as built: 2 × triple-expansion engines; 517 NHP; 1931: as above, plus 2 × exhaust steam turbines, 1,622 NHP
- Propulsion: 2 × screws
- Speed: 1923: 15.75 knots (29.17 km/h); 1931: 16.3 knots (30.2 km/h)
- Capacity: 1926-1930: 494 cabin class, 266 tourist class, 251 third class 1931-1934: 214 cabin class; 358 tourist class; 221 third class 1935-on: 496 (one class for cruising only)

SS General von Steuben was a German passenger liner and later an armed transport ship of the German Navy that was sunk in the Baltic Sea during World War II. She was launched in 1923 as München (after the German city, sometimes spelled Muenchen), renamed General von Steuben in 1930 (after the famous German officer of the American Revolutionary War), and renamed Steuben in 1938.

During World War II, the ship served as a troop accommodation vessel, and from 1944 as an armed transport. On 10 February 1945, while evacuating German military personnel, wounded soldiers, and civilian refugees during Operation Hannibal, the ship was torpedoed by the Soviet submarine S-13 and sank. An estimated 4,000 people lost their lives in the sinking.

== Early history ==
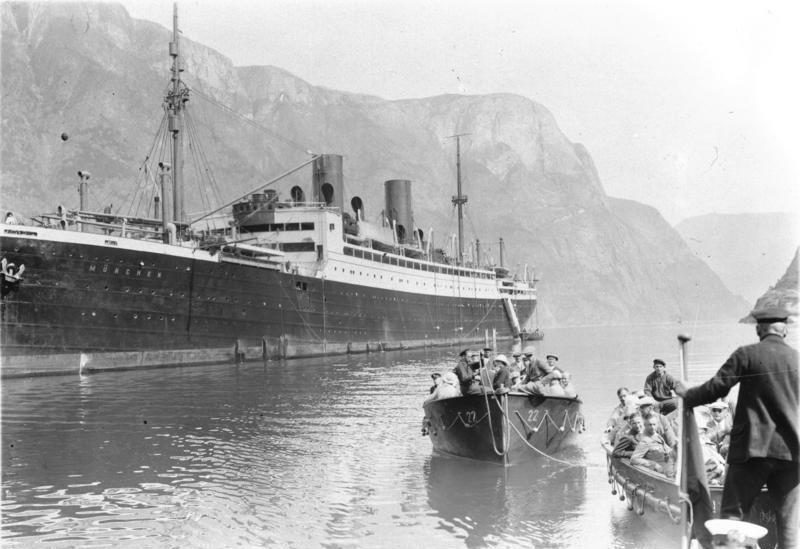
Passengers disembark from the München at Gudvangen, Norway in the summer of 1925

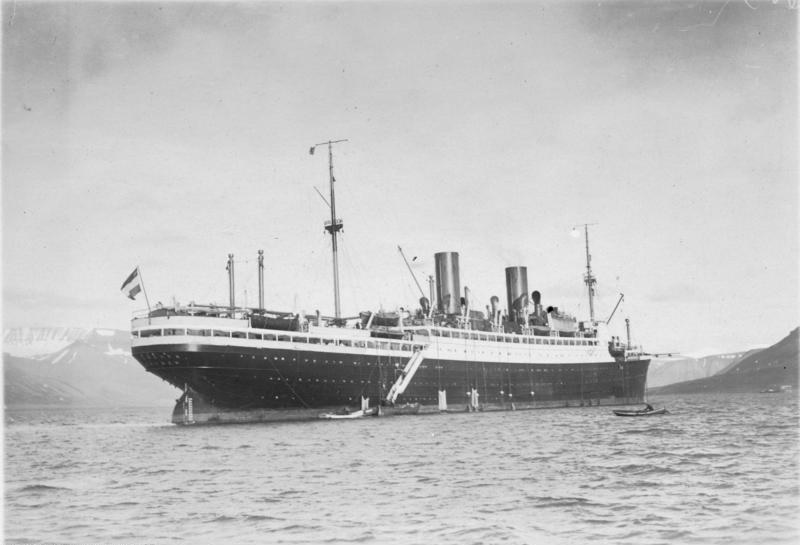
The München in the harbour of Advent Bay in July of 1925

In 1923, München became the first German trans-Atlantic passenger liner to be launched, and also the first to enter New York Harbor, since the end of World War I. She arrived in July 1923 on her maiden transatlantic voyage.

== 1930 fire and sinking ==
On 11 February 1930, after München docked in New York City and discharged passengers and most of her crew from a voyage from Bremen, Germany, a fire broke out in a paint locker on board and quickly spread to another storage hold. The massive fire and explosion resulted in a five-alarm fire and all of the city's fire equipment was sent to the burning ship. The fire could not be controlled and the ship sank next to the wharf where it had docked.

In one of the largest shipping salvage efforts of its time, München was raised, towed to a dry dock, repaired, and returned to service. Shortly afterwards, the ship's owner renamed her General von Steuben.

1931-08-05 Ship depicted on its dinner menu, 1931

== World War II ==
The ship, now called Steuben, was recommissioned in 1939 as a Kriegsmarine accommodation ship. In 1944, she was pressed into service as a transport ship returning wounded troops to Kiel from eastern Baltic ports.

=== Operation Hannibal ===
Along with the Wilhelm Gustloff and numerous other vessels, Steuben was part of the largest evacuation by sea in modern times. The Operation Hannibal evacuations surpassed the British evacuation at Dunkirk in both size of the operation and number of people evacuated.

By early January 1945, Grossadmiral Karl Dönitz realized that Germany was soon to be defeated. Wishing to save his submariners, he radioed a coded message on 23 January 1945 to the Baltic Sea port of Gotenhafen (the Polish city and port of Gdynia under German occupation) to evacuate to the West, under the code name Operation Hannibal.

Submariners at that point were schooled and housed in ships floating in the Baltic ports, most of them at Gotenhafen. Among the ships were Deutschland, Hamburg, Hansa, and Wilhelm Gustloff.

Notwithstanding the losses suffered during the operation, over two million people were evacuated ahead of the Red Army's advance into East Prussia and Danzig (now Gdańsk, Poland).

In the winter of 1945, East Prussian refugees headed west, away from the city of Königsberg and ahead of the Soviet advance into the Baltic States and East Prussia. Thousands fled to the Baltic seaport at Pillau (now Baltiysk, Russia), hoping to board ships that would carry them to the relative safety of Western Germany. Steuben was part of the fleet sent for the purpose.

=== Final voyage ===
On 9 February 1945, the 14,660-ton Steuben sailed from Pillau, near Königsberg on the Baltic coast, for Swinemünde (now Świnoujście, Poland). Official reports listed 2,800 wounded German soldiers; 800 civilians; 100 returning soldiers; 270 navy medical personnel (including doctors, nurses and auxiliaries); 12 nurses from Pillau; 64 crew for the ship's anti-aircraft guns, 61 naval personnel, radio operators, signal men, machine operators and administrators, plus 160 merchant navy crewmen, for a total of 4,267 people on board. Due to the rapid evacuation ahead of the Red Army's advance, many Eastern German and Baltic refugees boarded the Steuben without being registered, increasing the number of those on board to approximately 5,200.

Just before midnight on 9 February, the Soviet submarine S-13, commanded by Alexander Marinesko, fired two torpedoes 14 seconds apart at the Steuben; both hit her starboard bow, just below the bridge, where many of the crew were sleeping. Most were killed by the impact of the torpedoes. According to survivors, the Steuben sank by the bow and listed severely to starboard before taking her final plunge, within about 20 minutes of the torpedo impacts. An estimated 4,500 people died in the sinking. German torpedo boat T-196 hastily pulled up beside Steuben as she sank; its crew pulled about 300 survivors straight from Steuben's slanting decks and brought them to Kolberg in Pomerania (today Kołobrzeg, Poland). A total of 650 people were rescued from the Steuben.

== Wreck ==
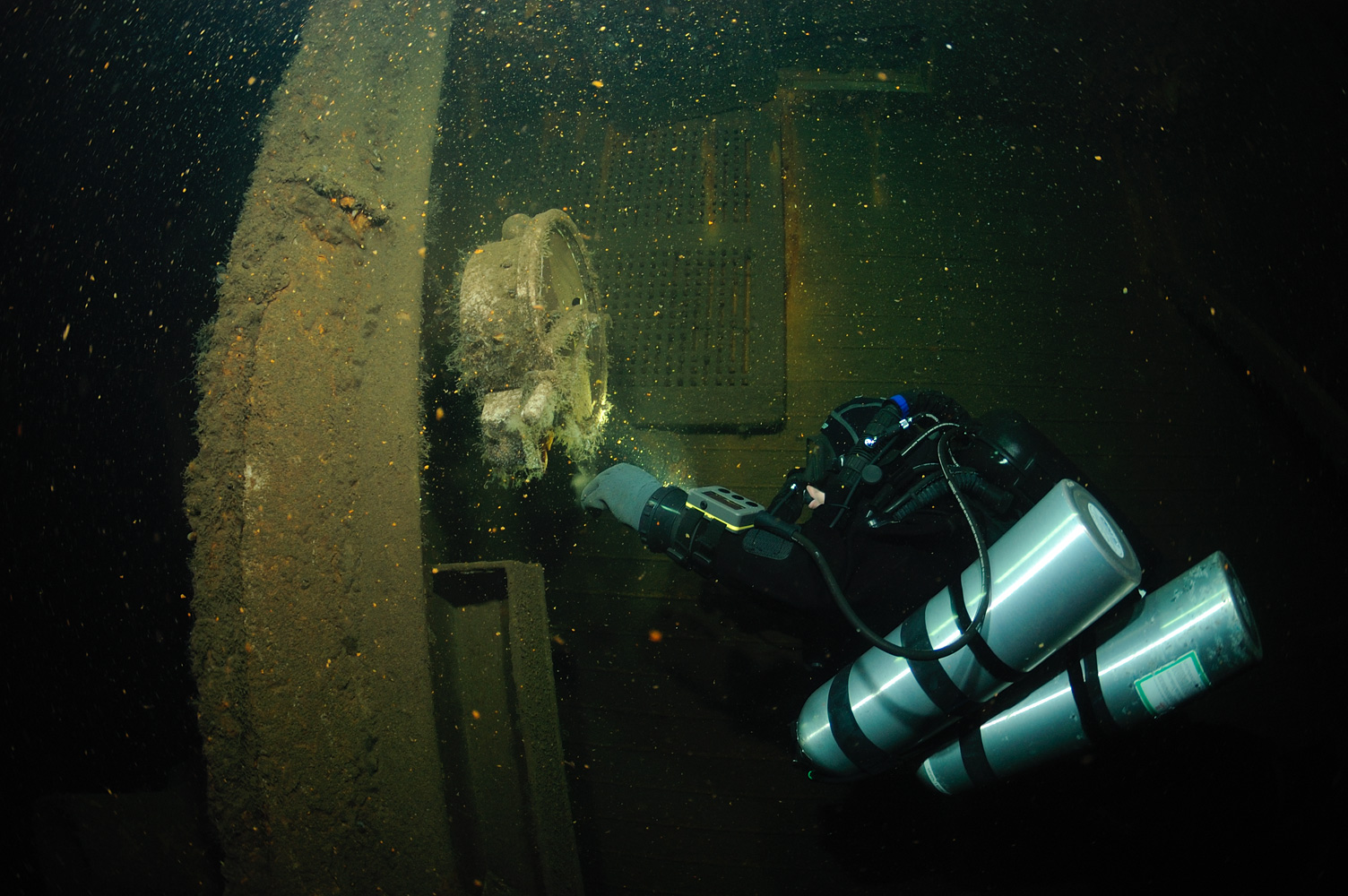
Scuba diver examining one of Steuben's engine order telegraphs

The Steuben wreck was found and identified in May 2004 by Polish Navy hydrographical vessel ORP Arctowski. Pictures and graphics appeared in a 2005 National Geographic article.

The wreck lies on its port side at about 70 metres (230 ft) in depth, and the hull reaches up to 50 metres (160 ft) in depth. The ship was mostly intact when it was found.

In July 2021, the German news magazine Der Spiegel reported that the wreck had been plundered and severely damaged in the process. The wreck is an official war grave, and entering it is illegal. Due to international treaties, the wreck remains property of the German state, but Poland is responsible for its protection. Over the past decade, looting has become one of the biggest reasons for the deteriorating condition of shipwrecks in the Baltic sea.

== See also ==
- Cap Arcona
- Iosif Stalin
- Goya
- Deutschland
- Thielbek
- MV Wilhelm Gustloff
- Armenia
- List by death toll of ships sunk by submarines
