= Operation Hannibal =

1945 evacuation of German troops from East Prussia and northern Poland by sea

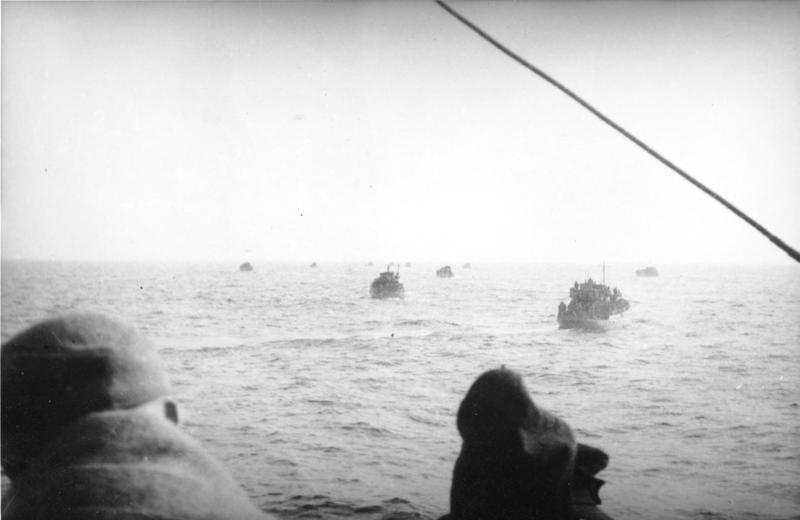
Evacuation boats crossing the Baltic Sea

Operation Hannibal was a German naval operation involving the evacuation by sea of German troops and civilians from the Courland Pocket, East Prussia, West Prussia and Pomerania from mid-January to May 1945 as the Red Army advanced during the East Prussian and East Pomeranian Offensives and subsidiary operations. The operation was one of the largest evacuations by sea in history.

== Background ==
Planning for Operation Hannibal started in late 1944, although it was done quietly since Hitler opposed such measures. The coordination of the evacuations was entrusted to Rear Admiral Conrad Engelhardt. By the end of 1944, Engelhardt had assembled a fleet of 22 former passenger liners, each displacing over 10.000 tonnes (11.023 short tons). Overall responsibility of the operation went to Admiral Oskar Kummetz. In early 1945, the Germans had two Escort Divisions in the area, the 9th and the 10th Escort Divisions. (German: Sicherungs-Division) The 9th Escort Division mainly consisted of lightly armed minesweepers.

The East Prussian Offensive by the Red Army's 3rd Belarusian Front under General Ivan Chernyakhovsky commenced on 13 January 1945 and, with Marshal Konstantin Rokossovsky's 2nd Belorussian Front, subsequently cut off East Prussia between 23 January and 10 February 1945. German Grand Admiral Karl Dönitz ordered Admiral Kummetz, as Naval High Commander, Baltic, and Rear Admiral Engelhardt, head of the Kriegsmarine's shipping department, to plan and execute the Rettungsaktion (evacuation operation). Dönitz radioed a message to Gotenhafen in occupied Poland on 23 January 1945, to begin evacuations to ports outside the Soviet area of operations. The operation was codenamed "Hannibal".

On 19 February, the Wehrmacht had managed to open up a corridor from Königsberg to Pillau, which allowed thousands of refugees to escape and wait for ships in Pillau, which would eventually transport them west of the Polish Corridor. Refugees also came from Cranz, Heiligenbeil, Elbing and Preußisches Holland. By 8 April as many as 450,000 refugees were in Pillau.

The flood of military personnel and German civilians eventually turned the operation into one of the largest evacuations by sea in history, much larger than the far more widely known British evacuation of Dunkirk five years earlier (Which evacuated 338,226 military personnel). Over a period of fifteen weeks, somewhere between 494 and 1,080 merchant vessels of all types, including fishing boats and other craft, and utilizing Germany's largest remaining naval units, carried between 800,000 and 900,000 German civilians and 350,000 soldiers across the Baltic Sea to Germany and German-occupied Denmark.

== Operations ==
=== Start ===
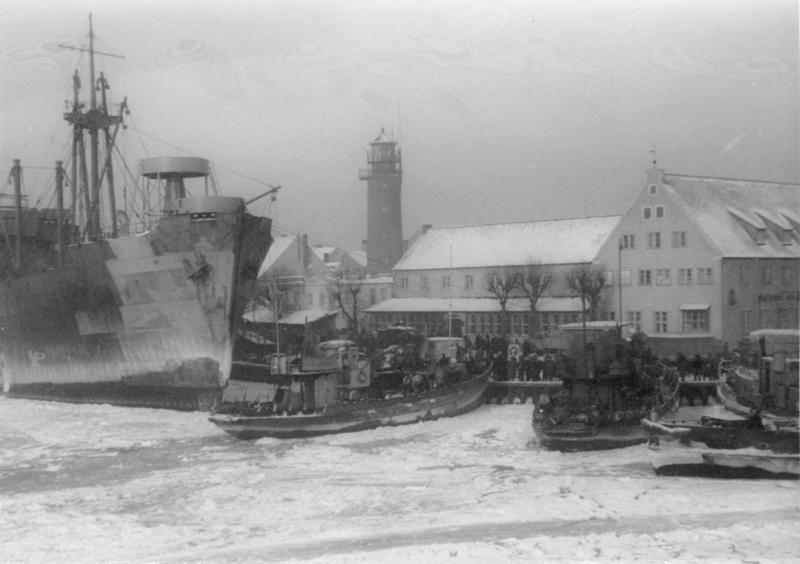
Civilians evacuating from Pillau by sea, January 1945

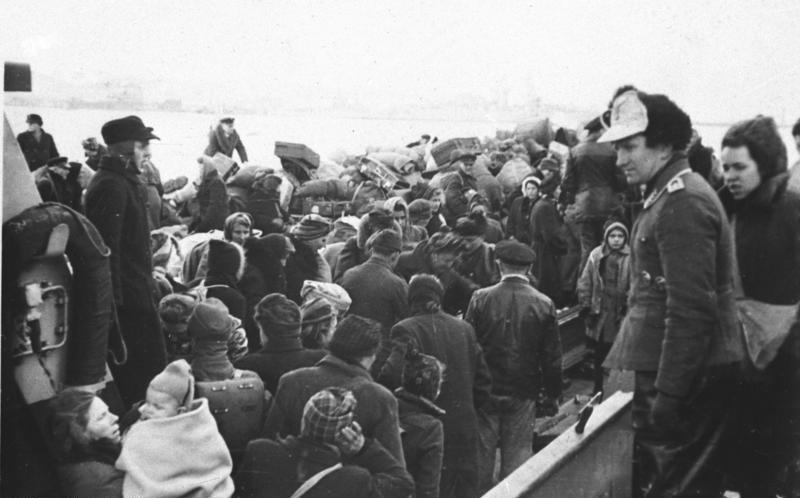
Refugees from Pillau embarking on a ship

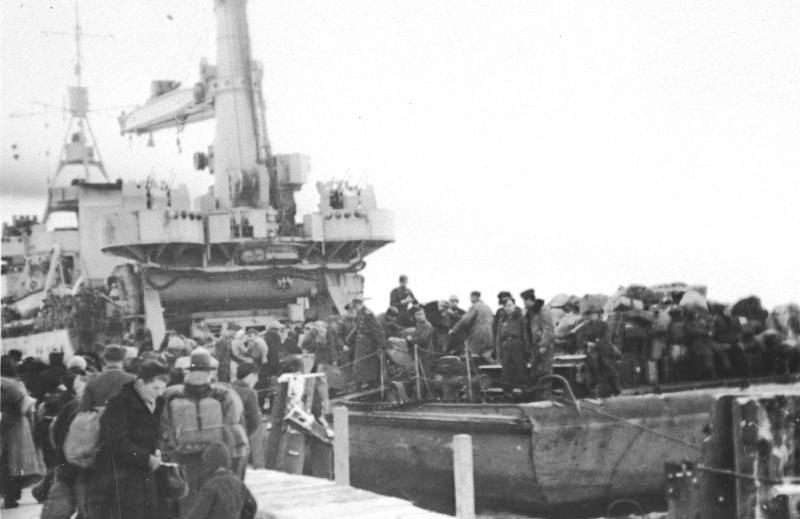
Civilians fleeing the besieged city of Königsberg on board the seaplane tender Hans Albrecht Wedel

Operation Hannibal commenced on 23 January 1945. At first, only 14 liners were available along with twenty-three freighters of more than 5,000 tons and many other smaller ships. On 30 January Wilhelm Gustloff, Hansa, and the whaling factory ship Walter Rau left the harbor at Gotenhafen in occupied Poland, bound for Kiel. Hansa was forced to return to port with mechanical trouble, but the Gustloff, overcrowded with more than 10,000 civilians and military personnel aboard, continued. She was torpedoed and sunk by the Soviet submarine S-13 off the Pomeranian coast, with possibly as many as 9,500 deaths, the largest loss of life in a single ship sinking in history. Those on Walter Rau eventually reached Eckernförde.

On 9 February the SS General von Steuben sailed from Pillau with between 3,000 and 4,000 mostly military personnel on board, heading for Swinemünde. She was also sunk by S-13, just after midnight, with 650 survivors.

In early March, a task force composed of the German cruiser Admiral Scheer accompanied by three German destroyers and the Elbing-class torpedo boat T36 were giving cover to a German bridgehead near Wollin. During that operation, naval small craft evacuated over 75,000 soldiers and civilians who had been isolated in that area. They were taken to larger warships and other transports lying offshore. While a number of these transports were sunk, large liners such as SS Deutschland got through and carried up to 11,000 soldiers and civilians each.

During the night of 4–5 April a flotilla of small boats and landing craft evacuated over 30,000 soldiers and civilians from Oxhöfter Kämpe and took them to Hela. It is estimated that nearly 265,000 people were evacuated from Danzig (modern Gdańsk) to Hela during the month of April alone.

On 15 April another large convoy consisting of four liners and other transports left Hela with over 20,000 soldiers and civilians. On 16 April the Goya was torpedoed and sunk by L-3, with the loss of over 6,000 lives; 183 survived.

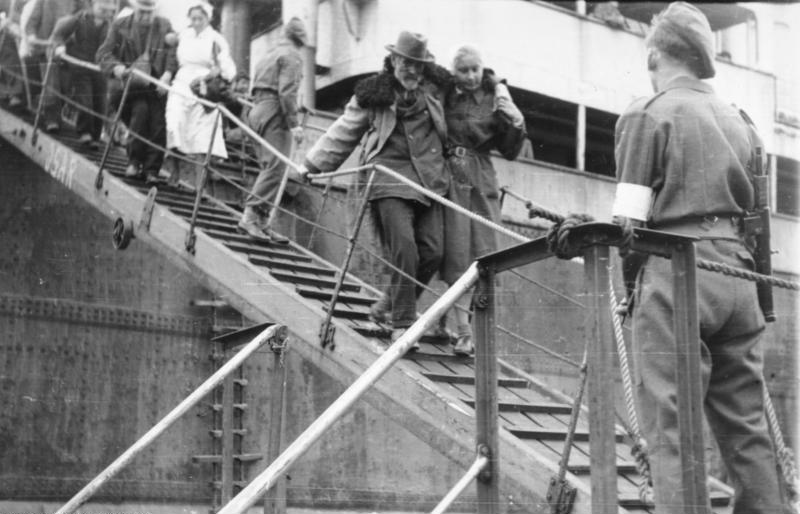
Evacuees arriving at a western harbor, already occupied by British troops

Initially, on becoming Reich President on 1 May, Dönitz was determined to continue the war in the east, going so far as to instruct Generaloberst Carl Hilpert that combat troops would have priority in evacuation to Germany from the Courland Pocket. It was not until the afternoon of 6 May, with British troops practically on his doorstep, that he gave up on that plan.

From 1 to 8 May, over 150,000 people were evacuated from the beaches of Hela. At 21:00 on 8 May 1945, the last day of the war, a convoy consisting of 92 large and small vessels left the Latvian city of Liepāja (German: Libau) with 18,000 soldiers and civilians. While several hundred of those who had boarded small ships on the last day of the war or after were captured by Soviet MTBs, evacuations to the west continued for at least a week after all such movements were prohibited by the terms of the German surrender.

=== Shortages ===
The collapse of German industry in the later years of the war meant shortages of food and medicine; the evacuation could not be properly supplied and so authorities rationed what they had. Military personnel were given priority, while the elderly, young children, and the sick were fed last. Consequently, there was a high rate of mortality among old and young refugees. Other shortages included only a three-week supply of coal provided for the sea transports and only a ten-day supply for rail transports to move troops to the front, with fuel being at its lowest levels since the war began.

== Losses ==
In addition to the Goya, Wilhelm Gustloff, and General von Steuben, 158 other merchant vessels were lost during the 15-week course of Operation Hannibal (23 January – 8 May 1945).

== See also ==
- Evacuation of East Prussia
- SS Cap Arcona (1927)
- SS Stettin (1933)

== Sources ==
- Eggleston, M.A.; Rogers, F.O.C. (2018). Operation Hannibal: The World War II Evacuation of East Prussia and the Disaster at Sea. CreateSpace Independent Publishing Platform. pp. 154–159. ISBN 978-1-7207-7143-2.
- Denny, I.; Showalter, D.E. (2017). The Fall of Hitler's Fortress City: The Battle for Konigsberg, 1945. Skyhorse. p. 195. ISBN 978-1-5107-1240-9.
