= Soviet submarine S-13 =

Stalinets-class submarine of the Soviet Navy

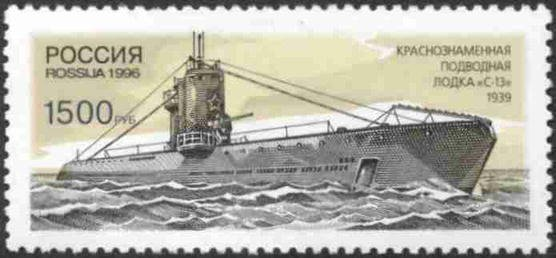
- S-13 portrayed on a Russian stamp, issued in 1996

History

Soviet Union
- Name: S-13
- Laid down: 19 October 1938
- Launched: 25 April 1939
- Commissioned: 31 July 1941
- Decommissioned: 7 September 1954
- Stricken: 17 December 1956
- Home port: Kronstadt

General characteristics
- Class & type: Soviet S-class submarine
- Displacement: 840 long tons (853 t) surfaced; 1,050 long tons (1,067 t) submerged
- Length: 77.8 m (255 ft 3 in)
- Beam: 6.4 m (21 ft 0 in)
- Draught: 4.4 m (14 ft 5 in)
- Propulsion: 2 × diesels 2,000 hp (1,491 kW) each; 2 × electric motors 550 hp (410 kW) each; 2 × shafts
- Speed: 19.5 knots (36.1 km/h; 22.4 mph) surfaced; 9 knots (10 mph; 17 km/h) submerged
- Test depth: 100 m (330 ft)
- Complement: 50 officers and men
- Armament: 6 × 21 in (530 mm) torpedo tubes (4 forward, 2 aft); 12 × torpedoes; 1 × 100 mm (4 in) gun; 1 × 45 mm (2 in) cannon

S-13 was an S-class submarine of the Soviet Navy. Her keel was laid down by Krasnoye Sormovo in Gorky on 19 October 1938. She was launched on 25 April 1939 and commissioned on 31 July 1941 in the Baltic Fleet. The submarine is best known for the 1945 sinking of Wilhelm Gustloff, a German military transport ship/converted cruise ship, while under the command of Captain Alexander Marinesko. With a career total of 44,701 GRT (gross register tonnage) sunk or damaged, she is the highest-scoring Soviet submarine in history.

== Service history ==
In the first half of September 1942, under the command of Pyotr Malanchenko, S-13 sank two Finnish ships, Hera and Jussi H., and a German ship Anna W, totaling 4,042 tons. When S-13 sank the freighter Hera, she fired on the ship's lifeboat but failed to hit it.

On 15 October 1942, caught on the surface while charging her batteries, S-13 was attacked by the Finnish submarine chasers VMV-13 and VMV-15. During her crash dive, the submarine hit the bottom, severely damaging her rudder and destroying her steering gear. The following depth charge attack worsened the damage, but S-13 escaped and made it back to Kronstadt.

During the next three years, Malanchenko was relieved by Alexander Marinesko and S-13 was repaired and returned to sea.

Under the command of Marinesko, then 32, on 30 January 1945, at Stolpe Bank off the Pomeranian coast, S-13 sank the 25,484-ton German armed transport ship Wilhelm Gustloff under Kriegsmarine ensign, overfilled with civilians and military personnel, with three torpedoes. Calculations published in 2002 estimate that more than 9,000 people were lost, the worst loss of life in maritime history.

On 10 February 1945, S-13 sank the German transport ship Steuben, which was carrying wounded personnel and refugees, with two torpedoes off the Stolpe Bank just before midnight. Of the 4,267 wounded and refugees on board, 3,608 perished and 659 survived.

Marinesko was posthumously awarded the title Hero of the Soviet Union in 1990.

S-13 was decommissioned on 7 September 1954 and stricken on 17 December 1956.

Ships sunk by S-13
Date	Ship	Flag	Tonnage	Notes
11 September 1942	Hera	(Finland)	1,379 GRT	freighter (torpedo)
12 September 1942	Jussi H.	(Finland)	2,325 GRT	freighter (torpedo)
18 September 1942	Anna W.	(Netherlands)	290 GRT	freighter (gunfire)
30 January 1945	Wilhelm Gustloff	(Nazi Germany)	25,484 GRT	transport ship (torpedo)
10 February 1945	General Steuben	(Nazi Germany)	14,660 GRT	transport ship (torpedo)
Total:			44,138 GRT	

S-13 also shelled and damaged the German fishing vessel, Siegfried (563 GRT), which was damaged but escaped.

== Bibliography ==
- Budzbon, Przemysław (1980). "Soviet Union". In Chesneau, Roger (ed.). Conway's All the World's Fighting Ships 1922–1946. Conway Maritime Press. pp. 318–346. ISBN 0-85177-146-7.
- Budzbon, Przemysław; Radziemski, Jan & Twardowski, Marek (2022). Warships of the Soviet Fleets 1939–1945. Vol. I: Major Combatants. Naval Institute Press. ISBN 978-1-68247-877-6.
- Polmar, Norman & Noot, Jurrien (1991). Submarines of the Russian and Soviet Navies, 1718–1990. Naval Institute Press. ISBN 0-87021-570-1.
- Rohwer, Jürgen (2005). Chronology of the War at Sea 1939–1945: The Naval History of World War Two (Third Revised ed.). Naval Institute Press. ISBN 1-59114-119-2.
