= Prison ship =

Ship converted for use as a detention center

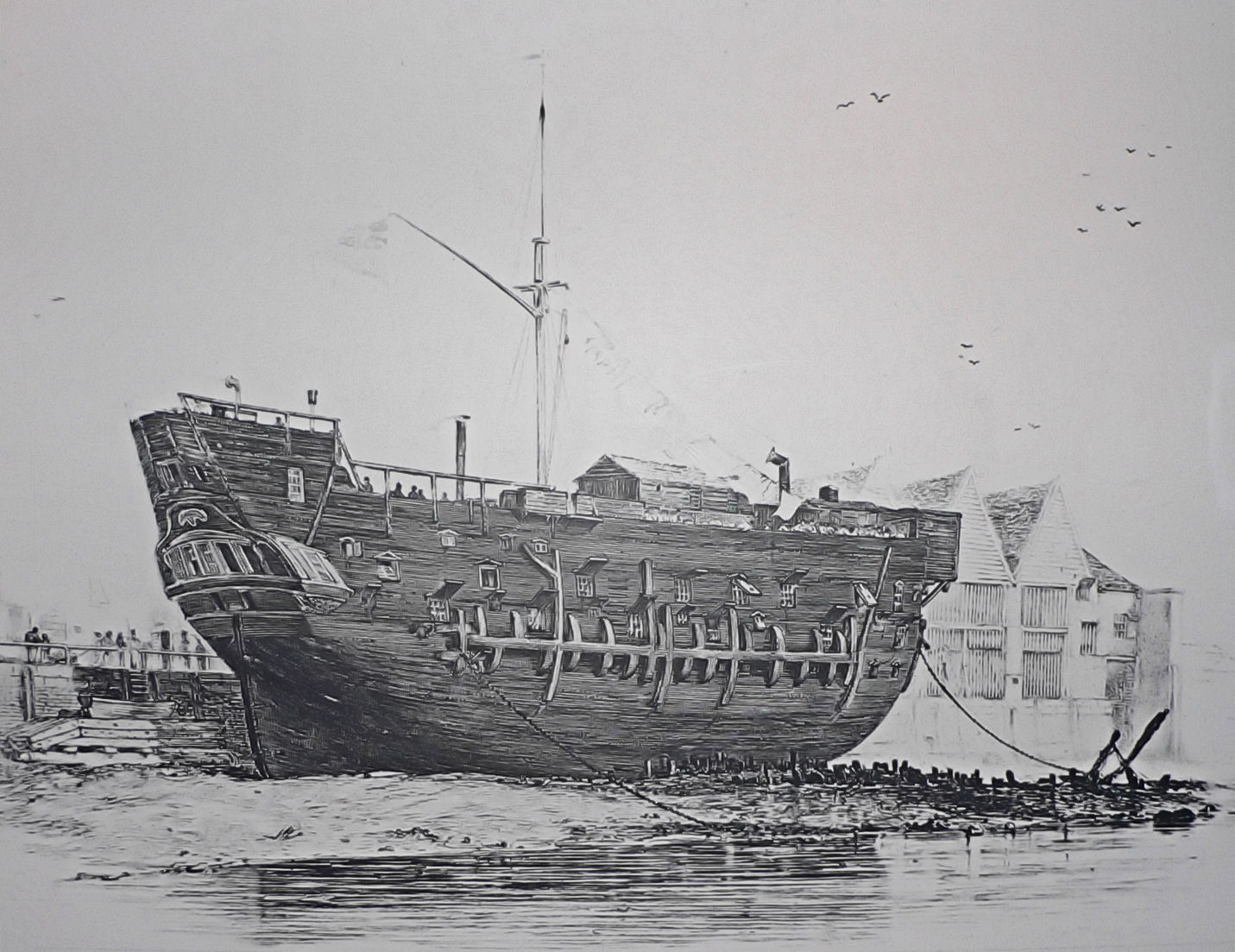
The beached convict ship HMS Discovery at Deptford. Launched as a 10-gun sloop at Rotherhithe in 1789, the ship served as a convict hulk from 1818 until scrapped in February 1834.

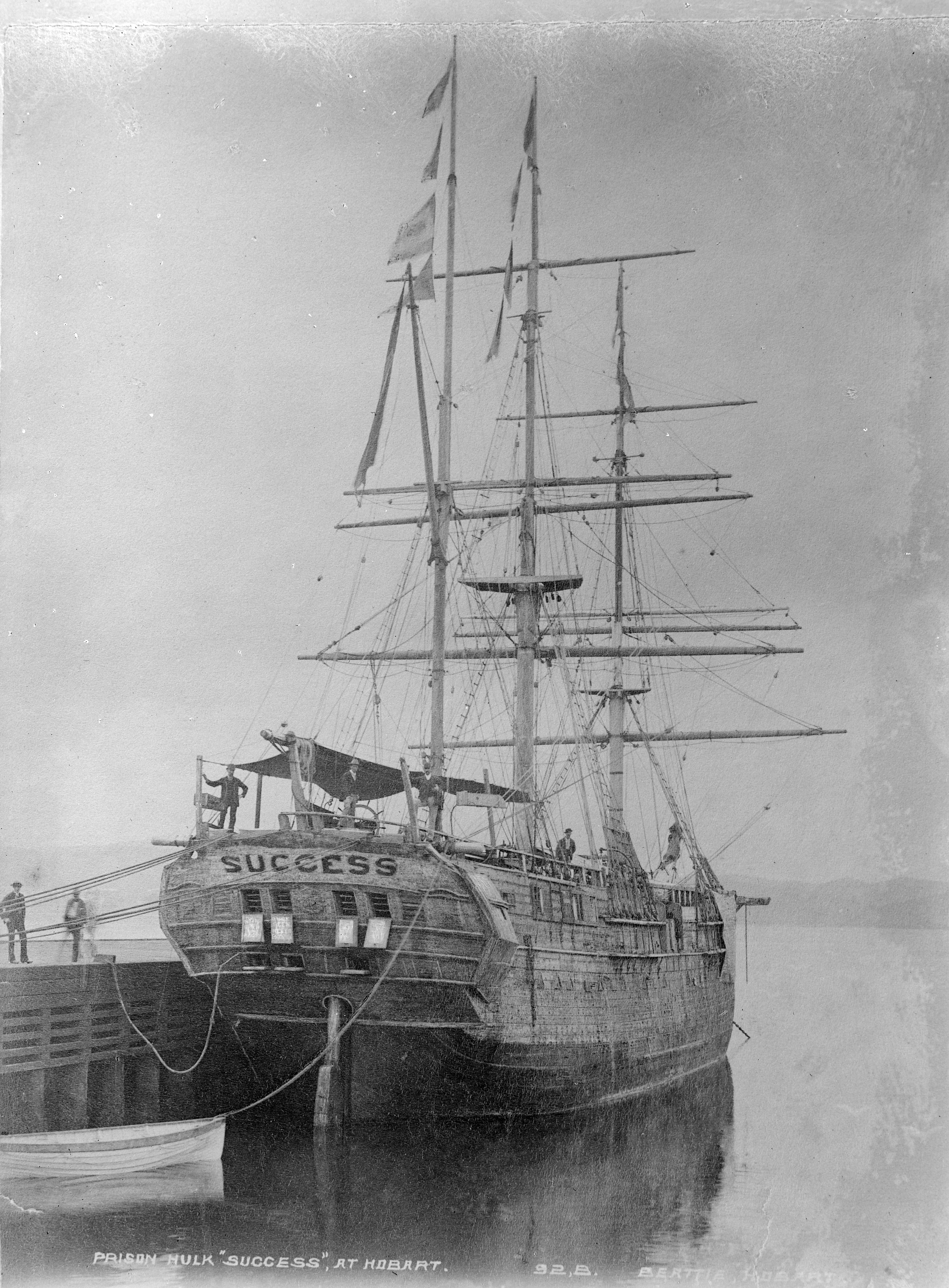
Prison ship Success at Hobart, Tasmania, Australia

A prison ship is a current or former seagoing vessel that has been modified to become a place of substantive detention for convicts, prisoners of war or civilian internees. Some prison ships were hulked. While many nations have deployed prison ships over time, the practice was most widespread in 18th- and 19th-century Britain, as the government sought to address the issues of overcrowded civilian jails on land and an influx of enemy detainees from the War of Jenkins' Ear, the Seven Years' War and the French Revolutionary and Napoleonic Wars.

== History ==
The terminology "hulk" comes from the Royal Navy meaning a ship incapable of full service either through damage or from initial non-completion. In England in 1776, during the reign of King George III, due to a shortage of prison space in London, the concept of "prison hulks" moored in the Thames, was introduced to meet the need for prison space. The first such ship came into use on 15 July 1776 under command of Mr Duncan Campbell and was moored at Barking Creek with prisoners doing hard labour on the shore during daylight hours.

The vessels were a common form of internment in Britain and elsewhere in the 18th and 19th centuries. Charles F. Campbell writes that around 40 ships of the Royal Navy were converted for use as prison hulks. Other hulks included HMS Warrior, which became a prison ship at Woolwich in February 1840. One was established at Gibraltar, others at Bermuda (the Dromedary), at Antigua, off Brooklyn in Wallabout Bay, and at Sheerness. Other hulks were anchored off Woolwich, Portsmouth, Chatham, Deptford, and Plymouth-Dock/Devonport. HMS Argenta, originally a cargo ship with no portholes, was acquired and pressed into service in Belfast Lough Northern Ireland to enforce the Civil Authorities (Special Powers) Act (Northern Ireland) 1922 during the period around the Irish Catholics' Bloody Sunday (1920). Private companies owned and operated some of the British hulks holding prisoners bound for penal transportation to Australia and America.

HMP Weare was used by the British as a prison ship between 1997 and 2006. It was towed across the Atlantic from the United States in 1997 to be converted into a jail. It was berthed in Portland Harbour in Dorset, England.

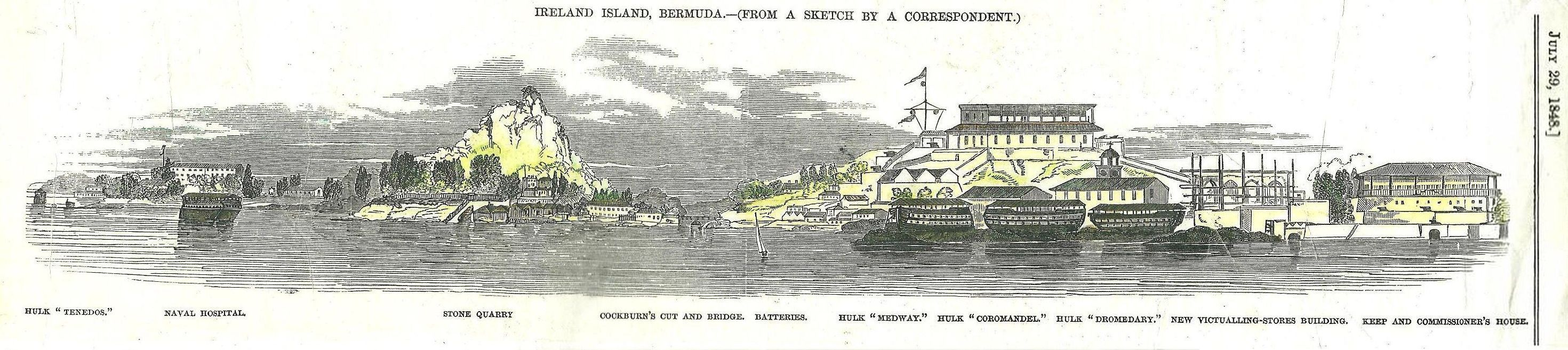
1848 Woodcut of the Royal Naval Dockyard, Ireland Island, Bermuda, showing four prison hulks

=== Use during the American Revolutionary War ===
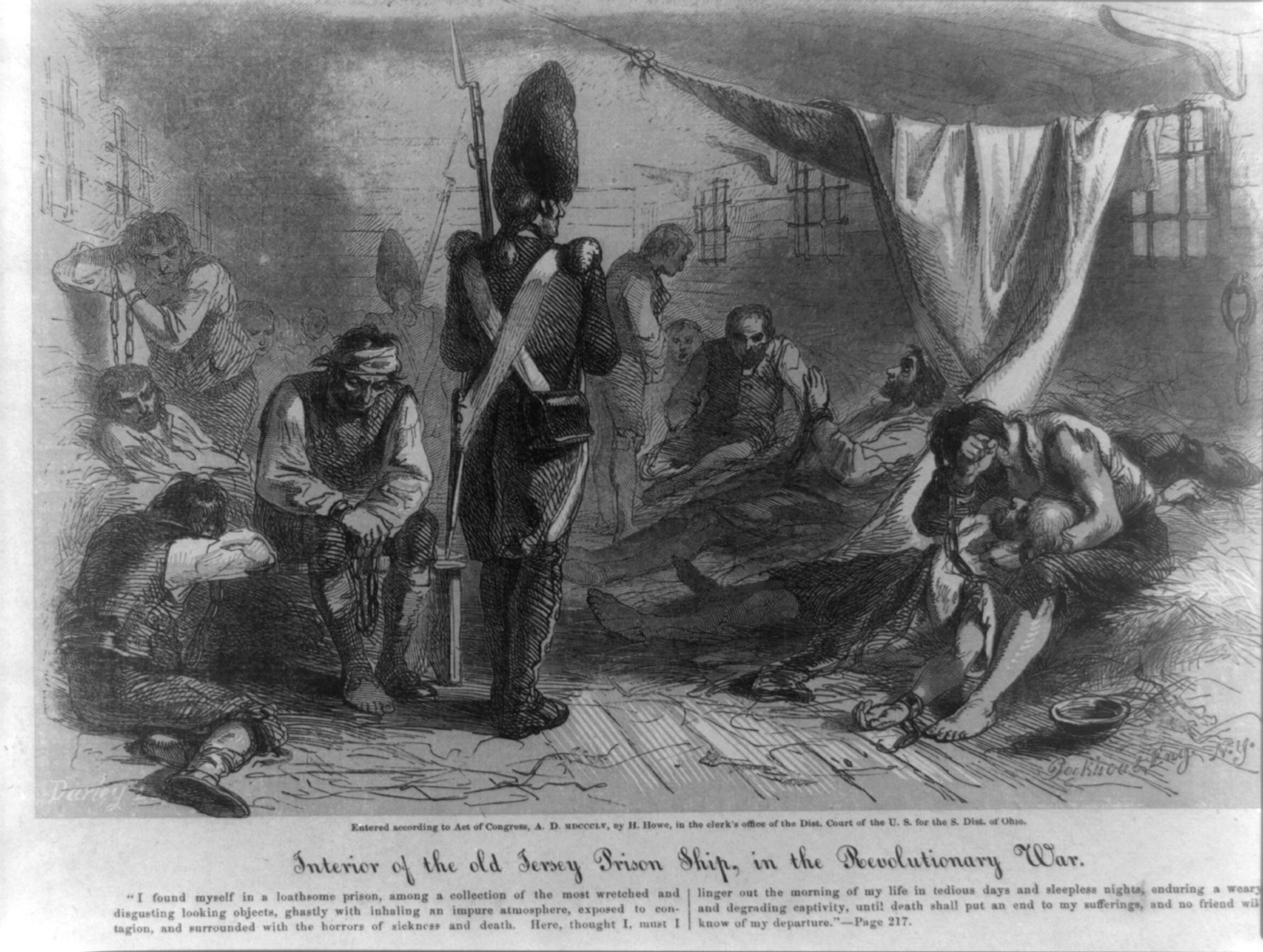
Interior of the British prison ship Jersey

During the American War of Independence, the British used a system of prison ships to imprison American prisoners of war. Many of these prison ships were moored in Wallabout Bay near New York City, which was a major British stronghold during the conflict. Conditions onboard these ships were abysmal due to overcrowding, the poor quality of the ships, mistreatment from guards and contaminated water and food. Waves of disease frequently spread through the ships, which combined with starvation killed 12,000 American prisoners of war. The bodies of those who died were mostly hastily buried along the shore, and were commemorated by the Prison Ship Martyrs' Monument in Fort Greene Park, Brooklyn.

Christopher Vail, of Southold, who was aboard one such prison ship, HMS Jersey in 1781, later wrote:

When a man died he was carried up on the forecastle and laid there until the next morning at 8 o'clock when they were all lowered down the ship sides by a rope round them in the same manner as tho' they were beasts. There was 8 died of a day while I was there. They were carried on shore in heaps and hove out the boat on the wharf, then taken across a hand barrow, carried to the edge of the bank, where a hole was dug 1 or 2 feet [30 or 60 cm] deep and all hove in together.

In 1778, Robert Sheffield, of Stonington, Connecticut, escaped from a British prison ship and told his story in the Connecticut Gazette, printed July 10, 1778. He was one of 350 prisoners held in a compartment below the decks.

The heat was so intense that (the hot sun shining all day on deck) they were all naked, which also served well to get rid of vermin, but the sick were eaten up alive. Their sickly countenances, and ghastly looks were truly horrible; some swearing and blaspheming; others crying, praying, and wringing their hands; and stalking about like ghosts; others delirious, raving and storming,--all panting for breath; some dead, and corrupting. The air was so foul that at times a lamp could not be kept burning, because of which the bodies were not missed until they had been dead ten days.

=== Use in Napoleonic Wars ===
Some British scholars have written that for prisoners of war held in hulks at Chatham, Portsmouth and Plymouth, living conditions on board and the mortality amongst prisoners were misrepresented by the French for propaganda purposes during the Wars and by individual prisoners who wrote their memoirs afterwards and exaggerated the sufferings they had undergone. Memoirs such as Louis Garneray's Mes Pontons (translated in 2003 as The Floating Prison), Alexandre Lardier's Histoire des pontons et prisons d’Angleterre pendant la guerre du Consulat et de l’Empire, (1845), Lieutenant Mesonant's Coup d’œuil rapide sur les Pontons de Chatam, (1837) the anonymous Histoire du Sergent Flavigny (1815) and others, are largely fictitious and contain lengthy plagiarised passages. Reputable and influential historians such as Francis Abell in his Prisoners of War in Britain, 1756–1814 (1914) and W. Branch Johnson in his The English Prison Hulks, (1970) took such memoirs at their face value and did not investigate their origins. This has resulted in the perpetuation of a myth that the hulks were a device for the extermination of prisoners and that conditions on board were intolerable. The truth appears to be much less lurid and when the death rates of prisoners are properly investigated a mortality of between 5 and 8 per cent of all prisoners, both on shore and on the hulks seems to have been normal.

=== Use to accommodate criminal prisoners ===
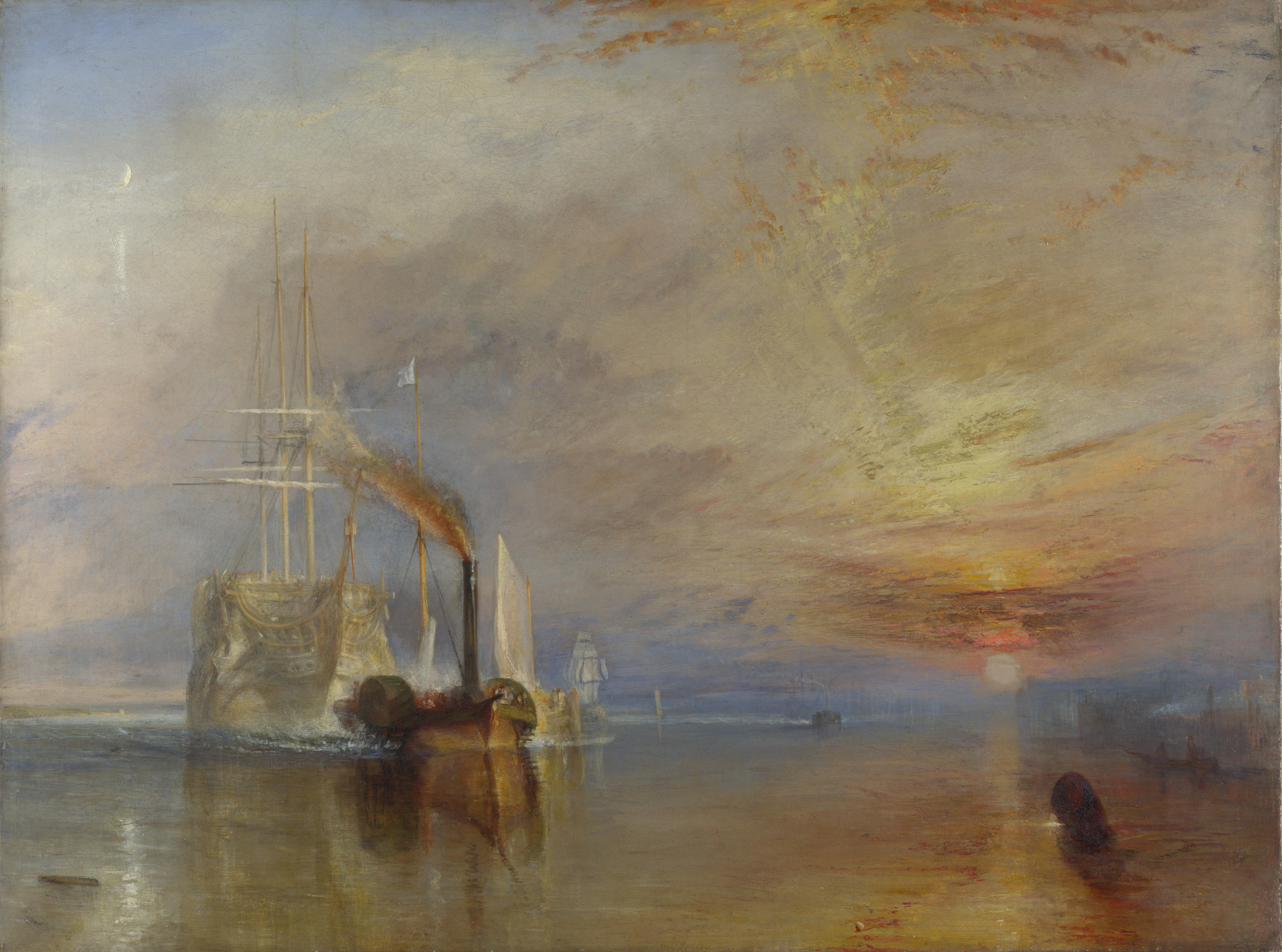
The Fighting Temeraire tugged to her last berth to be broken up by J. M. W. Turner (1838)

The first British use of a prison ship was the privately owned Tayloe, engaged by the Home Office in 1775 via contract with her owner, Duncan Campbell. Tayloe was moored in the Thames with the intention that she be the receiving point for all inmates whose sentences of transportation to the Americas had been delayed by the American Rebellion. Prisoners began arriving from January 1776. For most, their incarceration was brief as the Home Office had also offered pardons for any transportee who joined the Army or Navy, or chose to voluntarily leave the British Isles for the duration of their sentence. By December 1776 all prisoners aboard Tayloe had been pardoned, enlisted or died, and the contract ceased.

==== Thames prison fleet ====
While the Tayloe was still in use, the British Government was simultaneously developing a longer-term plan for the use of transportees. In April and May 1776, legislation was passed to formally convert sentences of transportation to the Americas, to hard labour on the Thames for between three and ten years. In July 1776, Tayloe's owner Duncan Campbell was named Overseer of Convicts on the Thames and awarded a contract for the housing of transportees and use of their labour. Campbell provided three prison ships for these purposes; the 260-ton Justitia, the 731-ton former French frigate Censor and a condemned East Indiaman, which he also named Justitia. Collectively, these three prison ships held 510 convicts at any one time between 1776 and 1779.

Conditions aboard these prison ships were poor, and mortality rates were high. Inmates aboard the first Justitia slept in groups in tiered bunks with each having an average sleeping space 5 feet 10 inches (1.8 m) long and 18 inches (46 cm) wide. Weekly rations consisted of biscuits and pea soup, accompanied once a week by half an ox cheek and twice a week by porridge, a lump of bread and cheese. Many inmates were in ill health when brought from their gaols, but none of the ships had adequate quarantine facilities, and there was a continued contamination risk caused by the flow of excrement from the sick bays. In October 1776 a prisoner from Maidstone Gaol brought typhus aboard. It spread rapidly; over a seven-month period to March 1778, a total of 176 inmates died, or 28 percent of the prison ship population.

Conditions thereafter improved. In April 1778 the first Justitia was converted into a receiving ship, where inmates were stripped of their prison clothing, washed and held in quarantine for up to four days before being transferred to the other vessels. Those found to be ill were otherwise held aboard until they recovered or died. On the second Justitia the available sleeping space was expanded to allow for just two inmates per bunk, each having an area 6 feet (1.8 m) long and 2 feet (61 cm) wide in which to lie. The weekly bread ration was lifted from 5 to 7 pounds, the supply of meat enhanced with the daily delivery of ox heads from local abattoirs, and there were occasional supplies of green vegetables. The effects of these improvements were evident in the prisoner mortality rates. In 1783 89 inmates died out of 486 brought aboard (18%); and by the first three quarters of 1786 only 46 died out of 638 inmates on the ships (7%).

==== Naval vessels ====
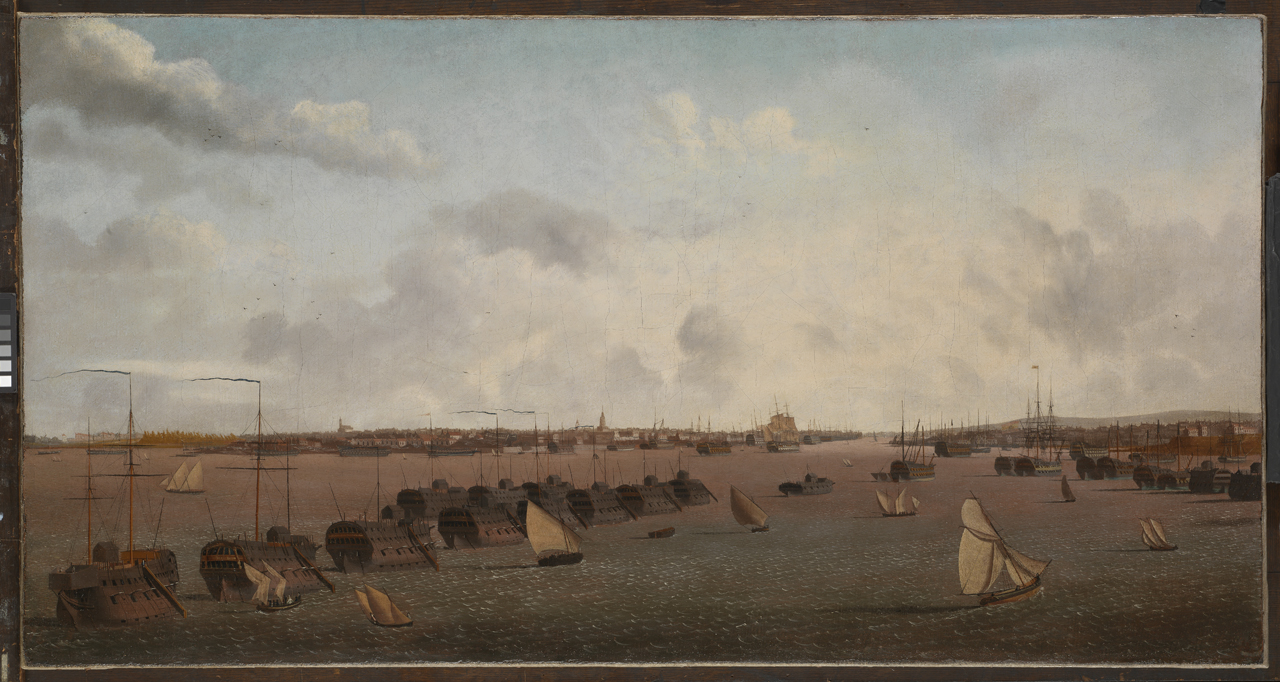
Portsmouth Harbour with Prison Hulks, Ambroise Louis Garneray

Naval vessels were also routinely used as prison ships. A typical British hulk, the former ship of the line HMS Bellerophon, was decommissioned after the Battle of Waterloo and became a prison ship in October 1815. Anchored off Sheerness in England, and renamed HMS Captivity on 5 October 1824, she usually held about 480 convicts in woeful conditions. HMS Discovery became a prison hulk in 1818 at Deptford. Another famous prison ship was HMS Temeraire which served in this capacity from 1813 to 1819.

=== Use in Australia ===
Hulks were used in many of the colonies of Australia, including New South Wales, South Australia, and Western Australia.

In New South Wales, hulks were also used as juvenile correctional centers. In 1813 a tender document was advertised in the Australian newspaper for the supply of bread to prisoners aboard a prison hulk in Sydney Harbour.

Between 1824 and 1837 Phoenix served as a prison hulk in Sydney Harbour. She held convicts awaiting transportation to Norfolk Island and Moreton Bay. One source claims she was Australia's first prison hulk.

Vernon (1867–1892) and Sobraon (1892–1911) – the latter officially a "nautical school ship" – were anchored in Sydney Harbour. The commander of the two ships, Frederick Neitenstein (1850–1921), introduced a system of "discipline, surveillance, physical drill and a system of grading and marks. He aimed at creating a 'moral earthquake' in each new boy. Every new admission was placed in the lowest grade and, through hard work and obedience, gradually won a restricted number of privileges."

Between 1880 and 1891 the hulk Fitzjames was used as a reformatory by the South Australian colonial government in Largs Bay. The ship kept about 600 prisoners at a time, even though it was designed to carry 80 or so crewmembers.

Marquis of Anglesea became Western Australia's first prison hulk following an accident in 1829.

=== World War I ===
At the start of the war, cruise liners in Portsmouth Harbour were used to hold detained prisoners.

=== Nazi Germany ===
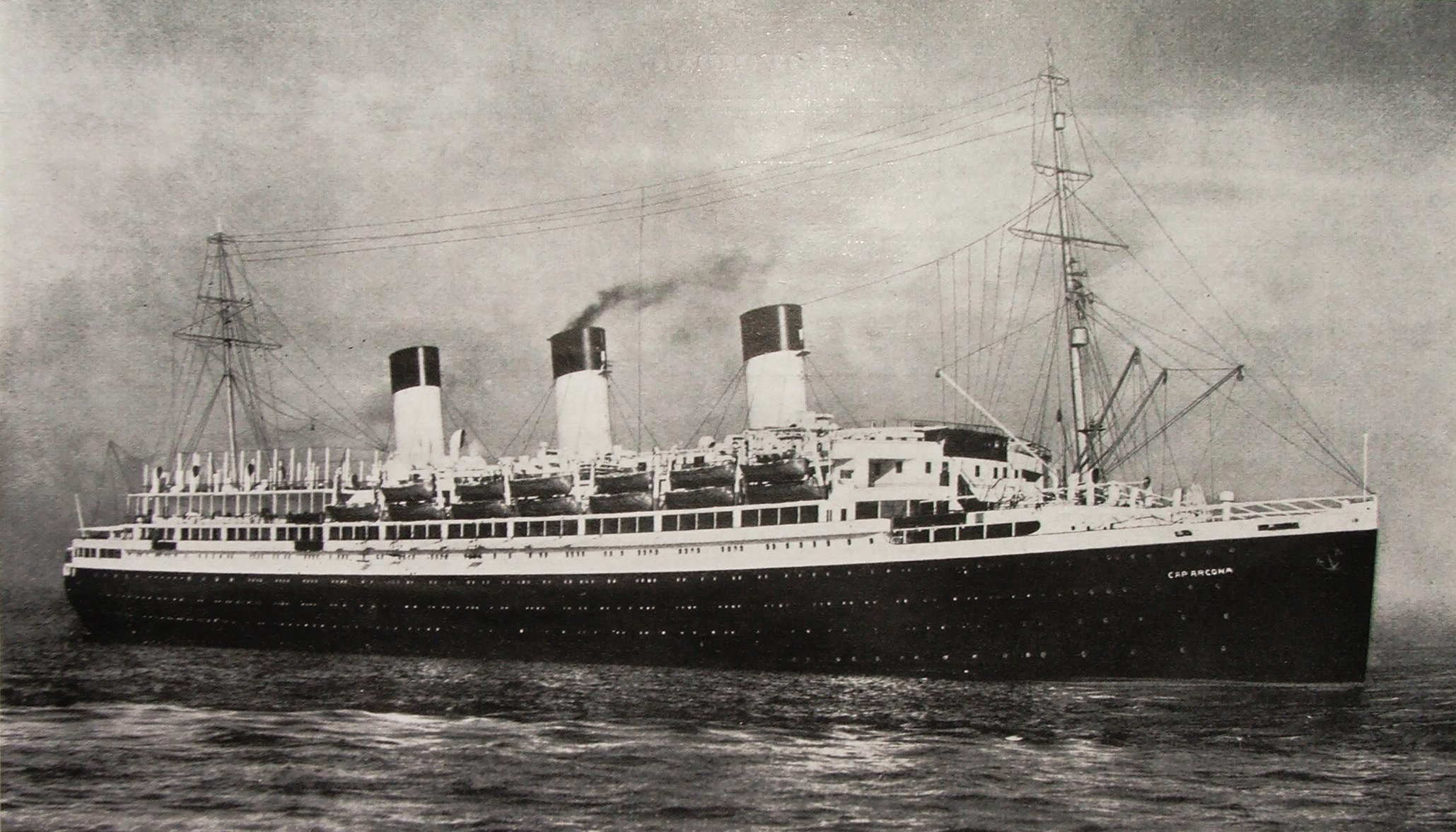
Cap Arcona, a passenger liner, was converted by Nazi Germany to hold concentration camp prisoners

Nazi Germany assembled a small fleet of ships in the Bay of Lübeck to hold concentration camp prisoners. They included the passenger liners Cap Arcona and Deutschland, and the vessels Thielbek, and Athen. All were destroyed on May 3, 1945, by RAF aircraft whose pilots erroneously believed them to be legitimate targets; most of the inmates were either killed by bombing or strafing, burned alive, drowned while trying to reach the shore, or killed by the SS guards.

=== Post-WWII uses ===
==== Chile ====
Reports from Amnesty International, the US Senate and Chilean Truth and Reconciliation Commission describe Esmeralda (BE-43) as a kind of a floating prison for political prisoners of the Augusto Pinochet administration from 1973 to 1980. It is claimed that probably over a hundred persons were kept there at times and subjected to hideous treatment, among them the British priest Miguel Woodward.

==== Philippines ====
In 1987, Colonel Gregorio Honasan, leader of various coups d'état in the Philippines was captured and was imprisoned in a navy ship then temporarily converted to be his holding facility. However, he escaped after convincing the guards to join his cause.

==== United Kingdom ====
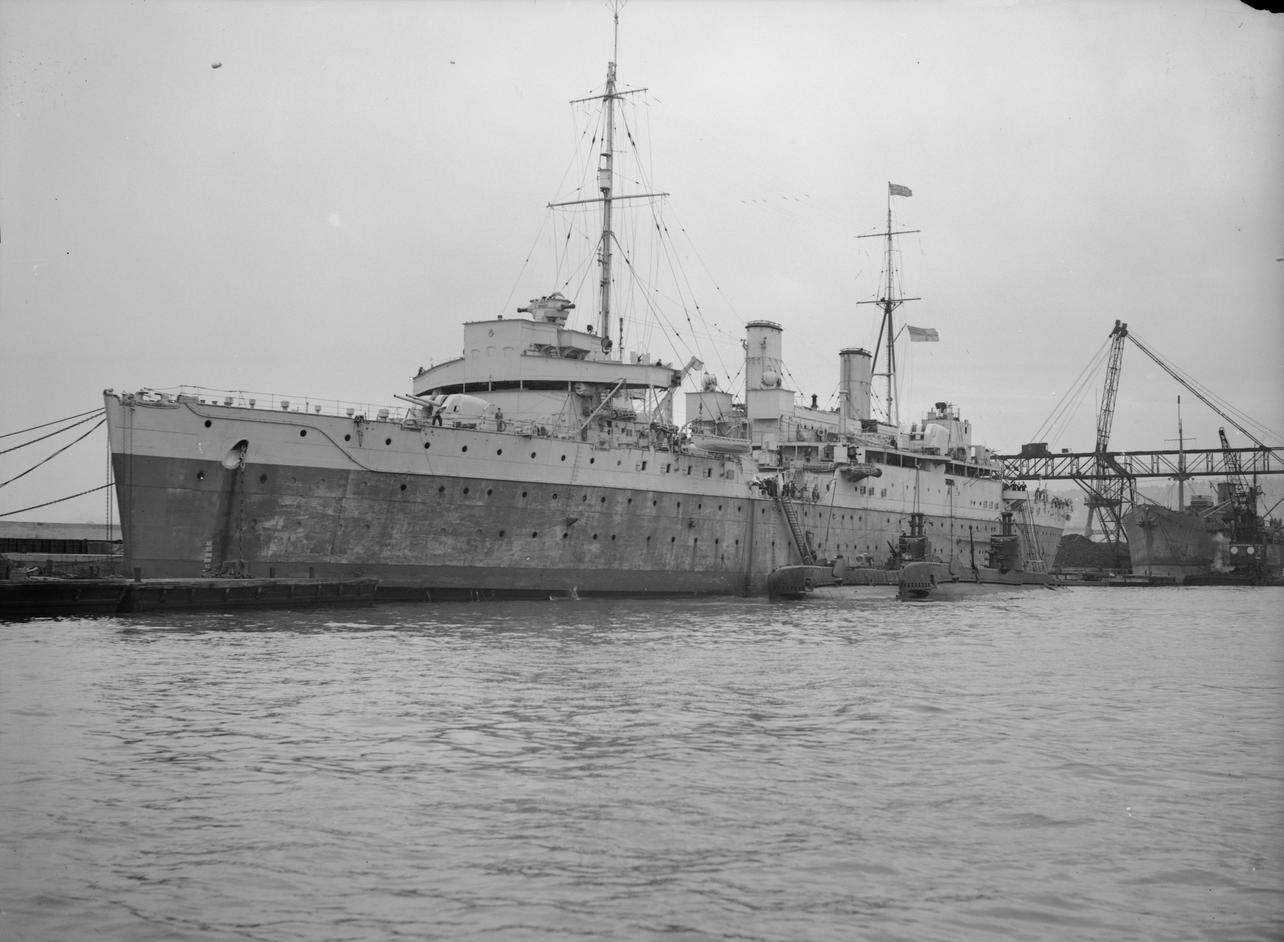
HMS Maidstone (pictured here in Algiers in the Second World War), a prison ship which docked at Belfast and where many internees were sent during The Troubles

HMS Maidstone was used as a prison ship in Northern Ireland in the 1970s for suspected Republican paramilitaries and non-combatant activist supporters. The former president of the Republican political party Sinn Féin, Gerry Adams, spent time on Maidstone in 1972. He was released in order to take part in peace talks.

In 1997 the United Kingdom Government established a new prison ship, HMP Weare, as a temporary measure to ease prison overcrowding. Weare was docked at the disused Royal Navy dockyard at Portland, Dorset. Weare was closed in 2006.

The barge Bibby Stockholm, planned to house asylum seekers, has been called a "floating prison".

==== United States ====
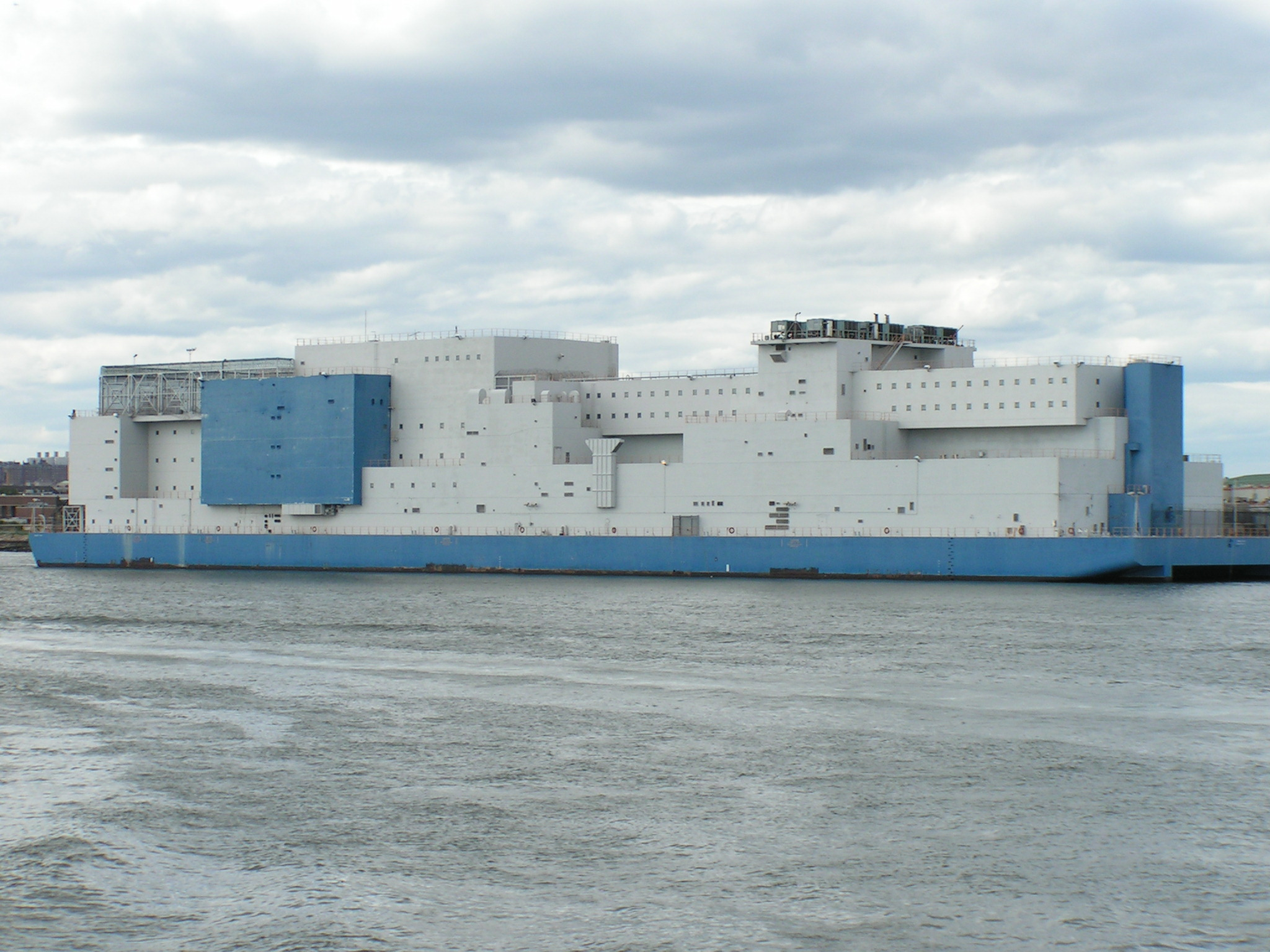
The Vernon C. Bain Correctional Center

In the United States, the Vernon C. Bain Correctional Center was a prison barge operated by the New York City Department of Correction as an adjunct to Rikers Island, opened in 1992. However, it was built for this purpose rather than repurposed. It was the largest operational prison ship facility in the United States during its operation.

In June 2008 The Guardian printed claims by Reprieve that US forces are holding people arrested in the Global War on Terrorism on active naval warships, including the USS Bataan and Peleliu, although this was denied by the US Navy. The United States subsequently admitted in 2011 to holding terrorist suspects on ships at sea, claiming legal authority to do so. The Libyan national Abu Anas al-Libi who worked as a computer specialist for al-Qaeda was imprisoned in the USS San Antonio for the 1998 United States embassy bombings.

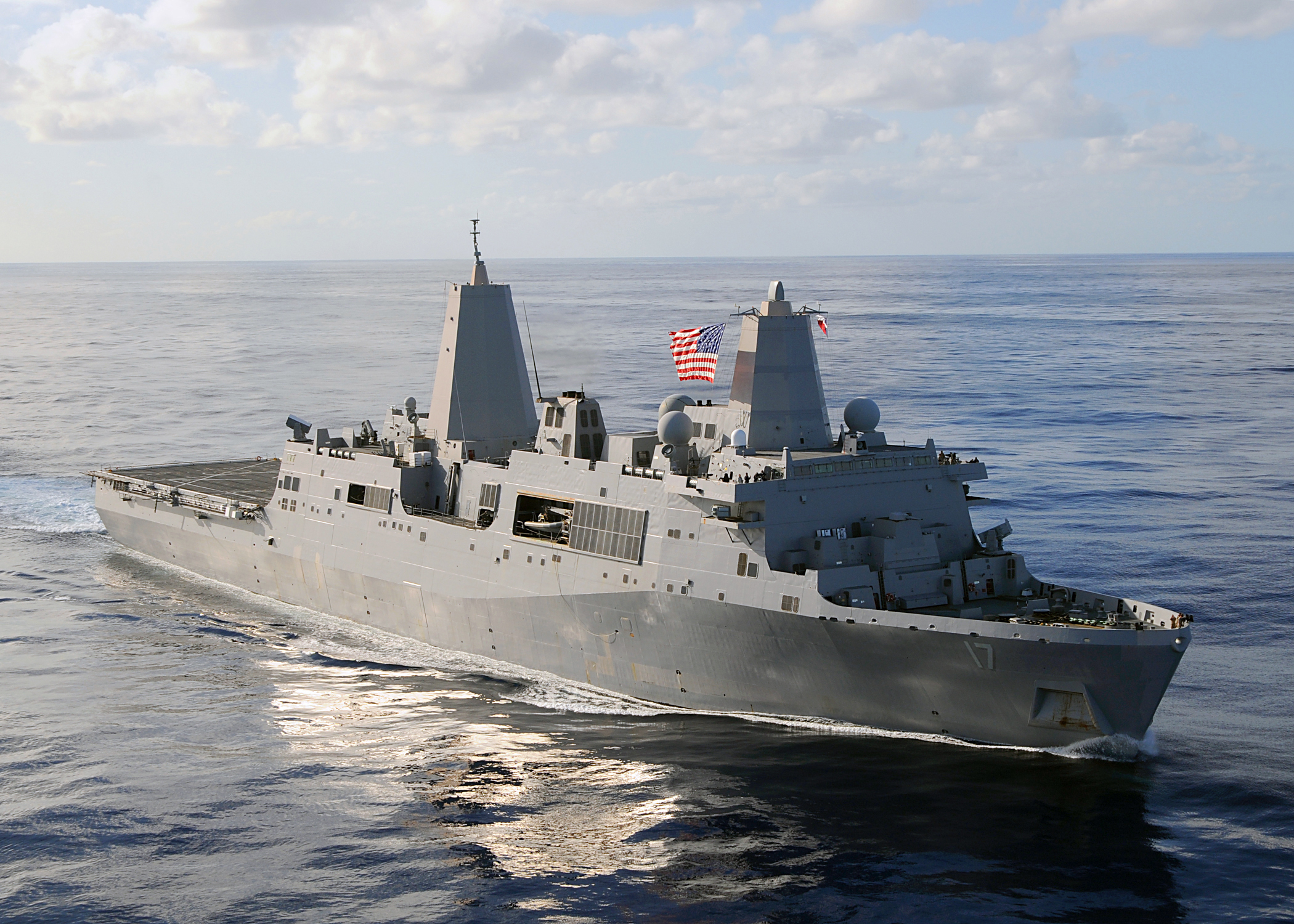
USS San Antonio amphibious transport dock

In 2009 the US Navy converted the main deck aboard the supply ship USNS Lewis and Clark into a brig to hold pirates captured off the coast of Somalia until they could be transferred to Kenya for prosecution. The brig was capable of holding up to twenty-six prisoners and was operated by a detachment of Marines from the 26th Marine Expeditionary Unit.

== In literature ==
Charles Dickens' novel Great Expectations opens in 1812 with the escape of the convict Abel Magwitch from a hulk moored in the Thames Estuary. In fact, the prison ships were largely moored off Upnor in the neighbouring River Medway, but Dickens used artistic licence to place them on the Thames.

French artist and author Ambroise Louis Garneray depicted his life on a prison hulk at Portsmouth in the memoir Mes Pontons.

== See also ==
- British prison hulks
- Convict ship
- Philip Morin Freneau
- Ambroise Louis Garneray
- Hell ship
- Bagne of Toulon

== Bibliography ==
- Bateson, Charles (1974) The Convict Ships, 1787–1868. (Sydney). ISBN 0-85174-195-9
- Colledge, J.J. (1987). Ships of the Royal Navy: The Complete Record of All Fighting Ships of the Royal Navy From the Fifteenth Century to the Present. Annapolis, Maryland: Naval Institute Press. ISBN 0-87021-652-X.
- Frost, Alan (1984). Botany Bay Mirages: Illusions of Australia's Convict Beginnings. Carlton, Victoria: Melbourne University Press. ISBN 0522844979.
