= HM Prison Weare =

Accommodation barge and prison ship

HMP Weare
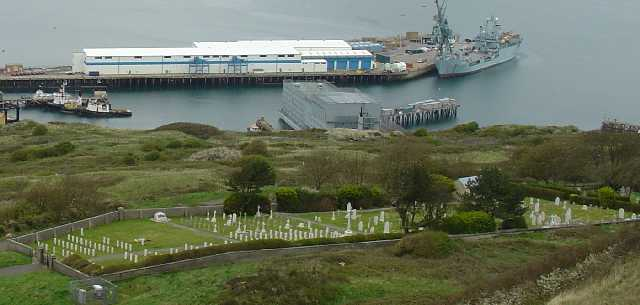
- HMP Weare prison block (centre), Portland Royal Naval Cemetery can be seen in the foreground
- Interactive map of HMP Weare
- Location: Portland Harbour, Dorset; 50°34′6.87″N 2°26′7.15″W
- Status: Closed
- Security class: Adult Male/Category C
- Capacity: 396
- Population: 400 (June 2004)
- Opened: 1997
- Closed: 2006
- Managed by: HM Prison Service

HMP Weare was an Adult Male/Category C prison ship berthed in Portland Harbour in Dorset, England. It was the latest in a lengthy history of British prison ships, which included HMS Maidstone, used as a prison during Operation Demetrius in the 1970s, HMS Argenta, in use as a prison in the 1920s, and a long list of British prison hulks dating from the late 18th century to the mid-19th century.

== History ==
The ship was built in 1979 by Götaverken Finnboda of Stockholm, Sweden, as a floating accommodation barge for the offshore oil and gas industry. It was one of several such vessels owned by the Swedish company Consafe Offshore AB, under the name Safe Esperia. The vessel was acquired by the British Bibby Line in 1982, renamed Bibby Resolution, and chartered to the Ministry of Defence to provide troop accommodation in the Falkland Islands.

The Bibby Resolution, and her sister ship Bibby Venture, were bought by the New York City Department of Correction in 1988 to serve as prison ships. Bibby Resolution, as Maritime Facility II (MTF2), was docked in the East River at Montgomery Street on the Lower East Side of Manhattan and held up to 380 inmates. It was finally closed in 1992. In 1994 both ships were sold.

The UK established HMP Weare in 1997 as a temporary measure to ease prison overcrowding, and after a formal planning application was agreed the Bibby Resolution, now HMP Weare, was brought from New York. Weare was docked at the disused Royal Navy dockyard at the Isle of Portland. The ship went on to hold 400 prisoners (as of June 2004) who were mainly at the end of their prison sentence. The ship had a five-storied cell block.

Upon the prison's opening, the ship became an object of political controversy, but later became something of a tourist attraction. The ship created two hundred and fifty jobs, and boosted the economy by an estimated £9 million a year. At the time it was also Portland's third prison, alongside HM Prison The Verne and HM Prison Portland. After two years of use, HM Prison Weare was given a positive inspection report by the then chief inspector of prisons, Sir David Ramsbotham, who said it delivered "the best possible treatment and conditions for prisoners under difficult circumstances". However, there was debate upon the ship's long-term future.

== Closure and subsequent history ==
On 9 March 2005, it was announced that the Weare was to close, mainly due to costly running, being unnecessary and the cost of millions of pounds in order to refurbish it. The prison briefly closed in 2005 and was reopened a few months later for a short period. Not long after, the prison closed permanently and was sold. In 2006, the ship was sold off after conditions on board were criticised by the Chief Inspector for Prisoners Anne Owers. The chief complained that the inmates had no exercise and no access to fresh air, also stating the ship was "unsuitable, expensive and in the wrong place".

Among the options about what to do with the ship were moving it to London to be used by the Metropolitan police to hold prisoners or sinking it in Portland Harbour or around the Isle of Portland as a man-made reef and as a diving location. In 2006, there was speculation that the government was thinking about buying the ship back, as it had been sold to a Nigerian shipping company to provide accommodation to oil workers.

History
- Name: 1979–1980: Balder Scapa; 1980–1981: Finnboda 12; 1981–1986: Safe Esperia; 1986–1994: Bibby Resolution; 1994–1997: Resolution; 1997–2006: HMP Weare; 2006: Weare; 2006 onwards: Jascon 27
- Owner: Sea Truck Group
- Port of registry: Kingstown, Saint Vincent and the Grenadines
- Builder: Götaverken Finnboda, Stockholm, Sweden
- Yard number: 409
- Launched: 1979
- Acquired: 2006
- In service: 2010
- Identification: Call sign: J8B3521; IMO number: 8636180; MMSI number: 376615000
- Status: in active service, as of 2012

General characteristics (as of 2010)
- Type: Accommodation barge
- Tonnage: 13,512 GT; 9,500 DWT
- Length: 93.14 m (305 ft 7 in)
- Beam: 25.8 m (84 ft 8 in)
- Height: 27.03 m (88 ft 8 in)
- Draught: 3.15 m (10 ft 4 in)
- Depth: 6.1 m (20 ft 0 in)
- Installed power: 5 × 280 kVA Volvo Penta diesel generators
- Propulsion: None
- Capacity: Accommodation for 608
- Aviation facilities: Helideck suitable for Sikorsky S-92A Helibus

After the closure of HMP Weare in 2006 the vessel was sold to the Sea Trucks Group, and refurbished for use as an oil industry accommodation vessel, and was intended to hold 500 workers. Renamed Jascon 27, the ship left Portland under tow in 2010, bound for Onne, Nigeria. As of 2023, its operating status was described as "laid up."
