= SS Cap Arcona =

German ship of the 1930s and 40s

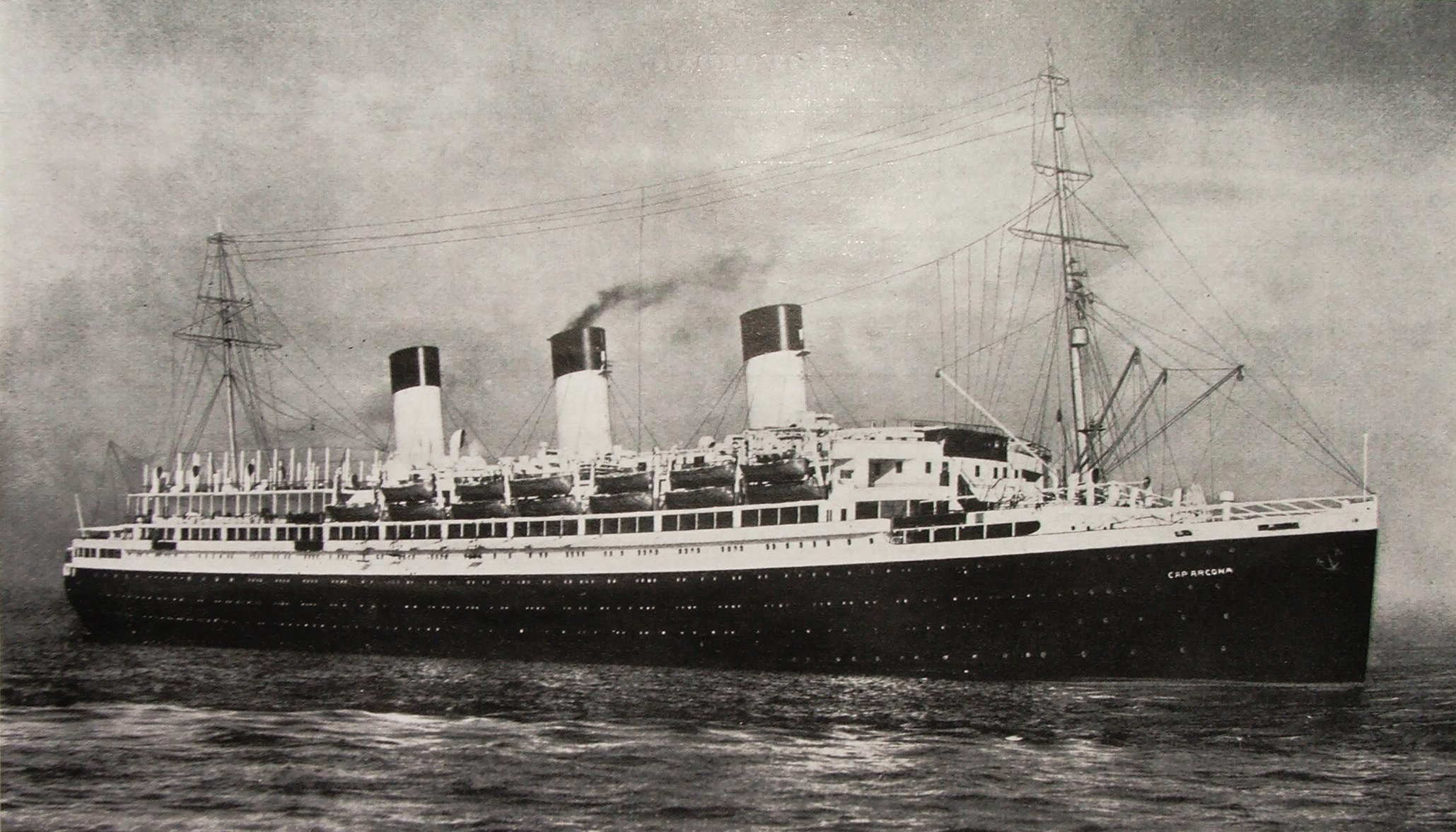
- Cap Arcona in 1927

History

Germany (Weimar Republic)
- Name: S.S. Cap Arcona
- Namesake: Cape Arkona
- Operator: Hamburg Südamerikanische Dampfschifffahrts-Gesellschaft
- Route: Port of Hamburg (Germany) – Port of Buenos Aires (Argentina)
- Builder: Blohm+Voss, Hamburg
- Yard number: 476
- Laid down: 21 July 1926
- Launched: 14 May 1927
- Maiden voyage: 29 October 1927
- Home port: Port of Hamburg, (Hamburg, Germany)
- Identification: Until 1933: code letters RGLP; From 1934: call sign DHDL
- Nickname(s): Queen of the South Atlantic; The Floating Palace
- Fate: Requisitioned for the Kriegsmarine (Nazi German War Navy), in November 1940

Nazi Germany
- Name: S.S. Cap Arcona
- Operator: Kriegsmarine (Nazi German War Navy)
- Acquired: 29 November 1940
- Out of service: 1940 – 14 April 1945
- Fate: Sunk by British Royal Air Force aerial attack and bombing on 3 May 1945. Wreck dismantled / scrapped in 1949.

General characteristics
- Type: Ocean liner
- Tonnage: 27,561 GRT; tonnage under deck 17,665; 15,011 NRT
- Length: 205.90 m (675 ft 6 in) overall
- Beam: 25.78 m (84 ft 7 in)
- Draught: 8.67 m (28 ft 5 in)
- Depth: 14.30 m (46 ft 11 in)
- Decks: 5
- Installed power: 23,672 shp (17,652 kW)
- Propulsion: eight steam turbines, two propellers
- Speed: Service: 20 knots (37 km/h; 23 mph) (Note: Port of Hamburg (Germany) – Port of Buenos Aires (Argentina) in 15 days)
- Range: 11,110 nmi (20,580 km; 12,790 mi) at 20 knots (37 km/h; 23 mph)
- Boats & landing craft carried: 26 lifeboats
- Capacity: From 1927: 575 1st class, 275 2nd class, 465 in dormitories; total 1,315; From 1937: total 850
- Crew: 475
- Sensors & processing systems: By 1930: submarine signalling, wireless direction finding; From 1934: as before plus echo sounding device, gyrocompass

SS Cap Arcona, named after Cape Arkona on the island of Rügen, was a large German ocean liner, later a requisitioned auxiliary ship of the Kriegsmarine (Nazi German War Navy), and finally a prison ship in the later months of World War II (1939–1945). A flagship of the Hamburg Südamerikanische Dampfschifffahrts-Gesellschaft ("Hamburg-South America Line"), she made her maiden voyage on 29 October 1927, carrying passengers and cargo between Germany and the east coast of South America, and for a brief period of time she was the largest and fastest ship on the route, until one month later she was surpassed on the same Europe-South America route by the Italian liner MS Augustus.

In 1940, the Kriegsmarine requisitioned the S.S. Cap Arcona as an accommodation ship. In 1942 she served as the set for the German propaganda feature film Titanic. In 1945 she evacuated almost 26,000 German civilian refugees from East Prussia before the advance of the Red Army.

Cap Arcona's final use was as a prison ship. In May 1945 she was heavily laden with prisoners from Nazi concentration camps when the Royal Air Force bombed her in the western Baltic Sea, killing about 5,000 people; with more than 2,000 further casualties in the sinking of the accompanying vessels of the prison fleet, Deutschland and Thielbek. This was one of the largest single-incident maritime losses of life in the Second World War.

== Building and equipment ==
Blohm+Voss in Hamburg built Cap Arcona, launching and completing her in 1927. She was 27,561 GRT, 205.90 m (675 ft 6 in) overall and a beam of 25.78 m (84 ft 7 in).

She was driven by eight steam turbines, single-reduction geared to two propeller shafts. She had three funnels, and her passenger comforts included a full-size tennis court abaft her third funnel. The ship had at least 26 lifeboats, most of which were mounted in two tiers (see image).

Cap Arcona had modern navigation and communication equipment. She was equipped for submarine signalling which allowed a ship to hear acoustic signals from aids to navigation. She also had wireless direction finding equipment, and from 1934 she had an echo sounding device and a gyrocompass.

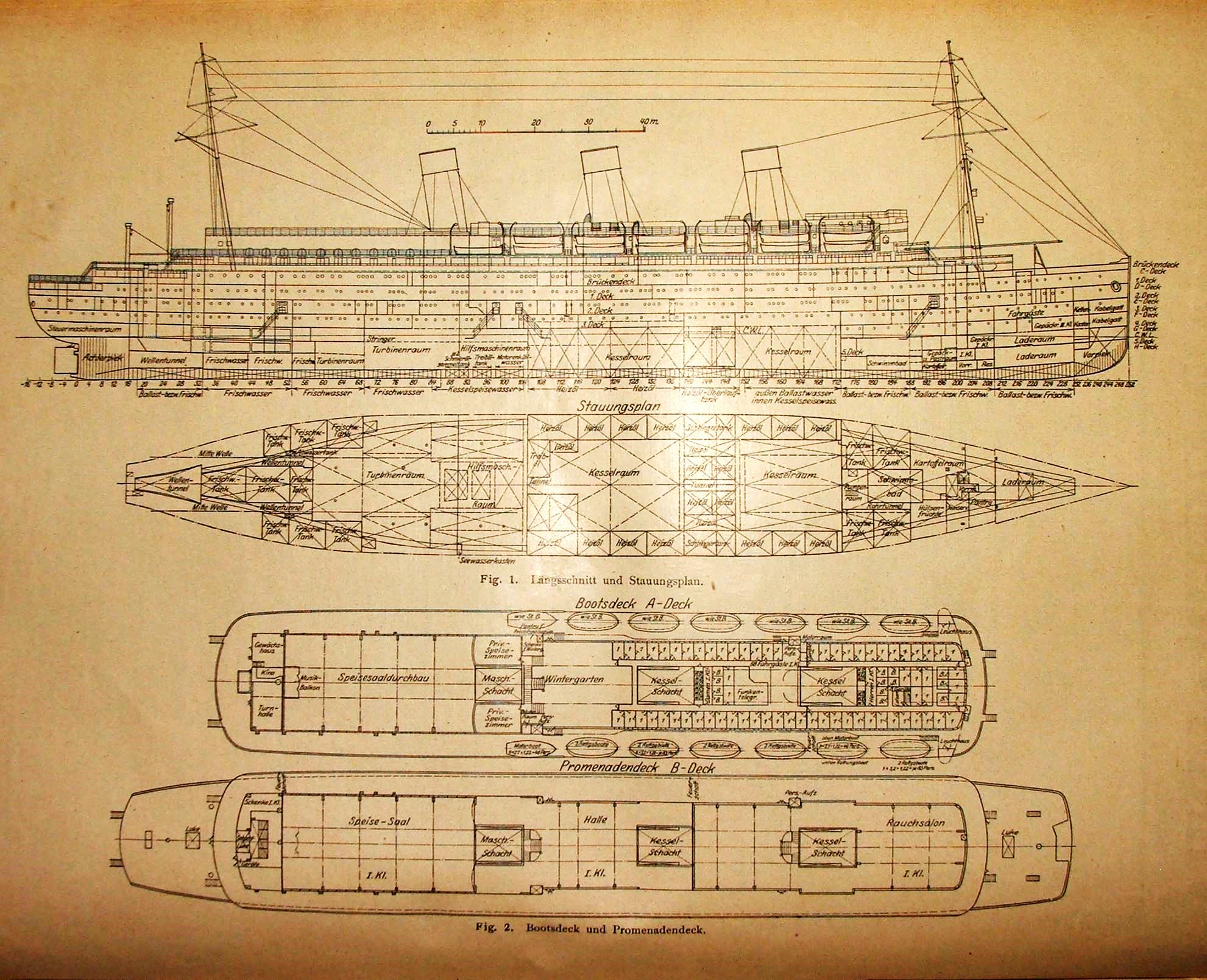
Plans of Cap Arcona.

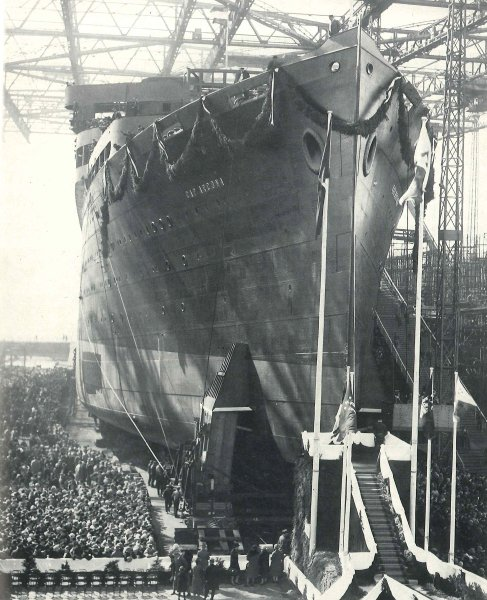
Launching of German ocean liner Cap Arcona, 14 May 1927.

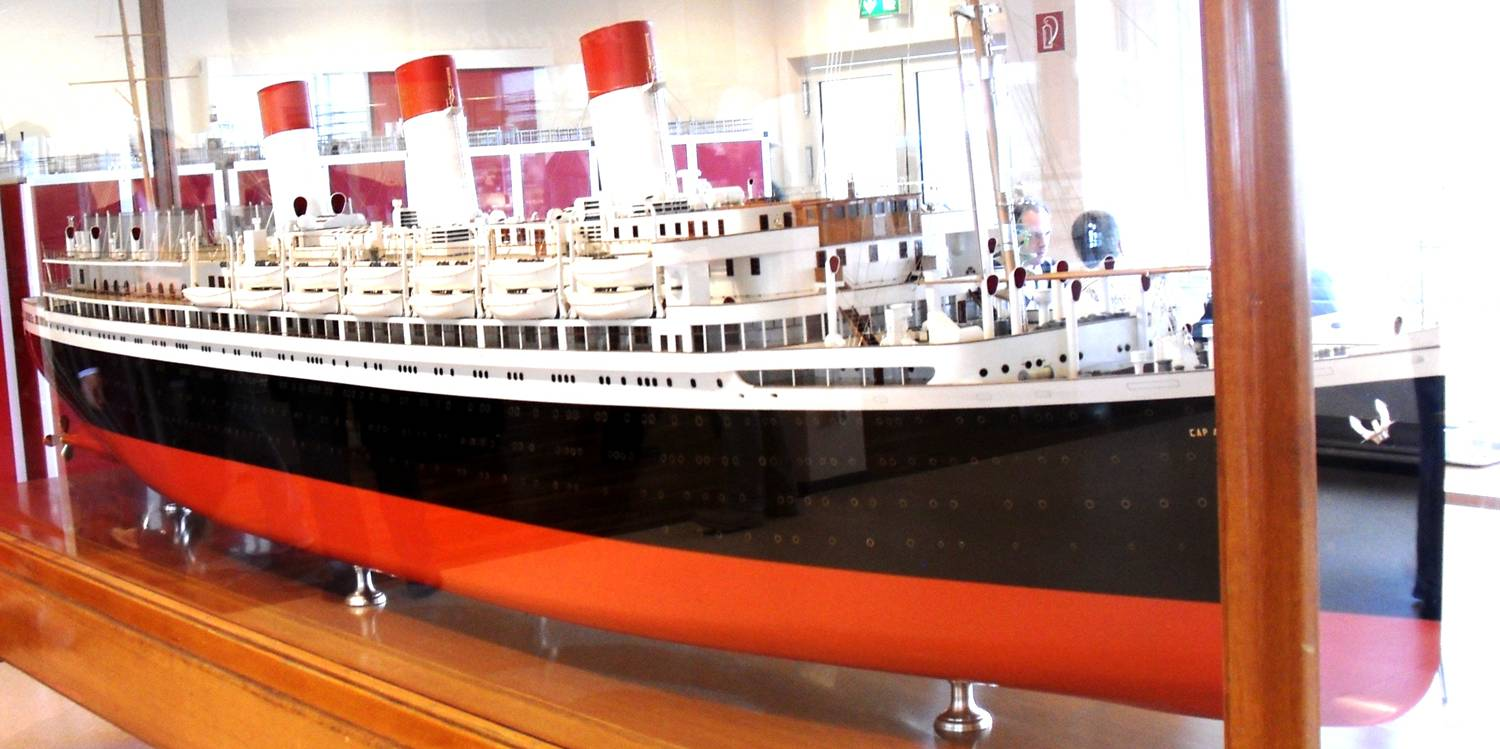
Scale model of Cap Arcona.

== Peacetime service ==
Cap Arcona entered service in 1927, commencing her maiden voyage on Hamburg Süd's route to Buenos Aires 29 October. She joined the older liner Cap Polonio on the route, which had been Hamburg Süd's flagship until Cap Arcona's completion. Cap Polonio was laid up in 1931 and scrapped in 1935, leaving Cap Arcona as Hamburg Süd's sole prestige ship on its South American route.

On 6 October 1932 Cap Arcona collided with the French cargo ship Agen in the North Sea off the Elbe 4 Lightship. Agen was beached, but later was refloated and escorted into Hamburg, Germany.

== Accommodation ship ==
In 1940 the Kriegsmarine (German Navy) requisitioned Cap Arcona, had her painted overall grey and used her in the Baltic Sea as an accommodation ship in Gotenhafen (now Gdynia).

In 1942 Cap Arcona was used as a stand-in for RMS Titanic, supplying exterior locations for the filming of the Nazi film version of the disaster in the harbour of Gotenhafen. The production partially repainted the ship's funnels and hull in White Star Line colors for filming. The film was completed, but the original director, Herbert Selpin, was arrested for disparaging remarks he made about Kriegsmarine sailors. His later self-destructive interrogation at the hands of propaganda minister Joseph Goebbels all but sealed his fate. He was found the next day hanged in his cell by his suspenders.

== Evacuation of East Prussia ==
On 31 January 1945, the Kriegsmarine reactivated her for Operation Hannibal, where she was used to transport 25,795 German soldiers and civilians from East Prussia to safer areas in western Germany. By then these trips were made very dangerous by mines and Soviet Navy submarines. On 30 January Wilhelm Gustloff, carrying around 10,000 passengers and crew, was torpedoed by the Soviet submarine S-13 and sank in 40 minutes. An estimated 9,400 people died. Early on the morning of 11 February, the same submarine torpedoed the 14,666 GRT General von Steuben on its way to Copenhagen with wounded and bed-ridden soldiers and civilian passengers, killing over 4,000 people. On 20 February, Cap Arcona's captain, Johannes Gertz, shot himself in his cabin while berthed in Copenhagen rather than face another trip back to Gotenhafen.

On 30 March 1945, Cap Arcona finished her third and last trip between Gdynia and Copenhagen, carrying 9,000 soldiers and refugees. However, her turbines were completely worn out. They could only be partially repaired and her days of long-distance travel were over. She was decommissioned, returned to her owners Hamburg-Süd and ordered out of Copenhagen Harbour to Neustadt Bay.

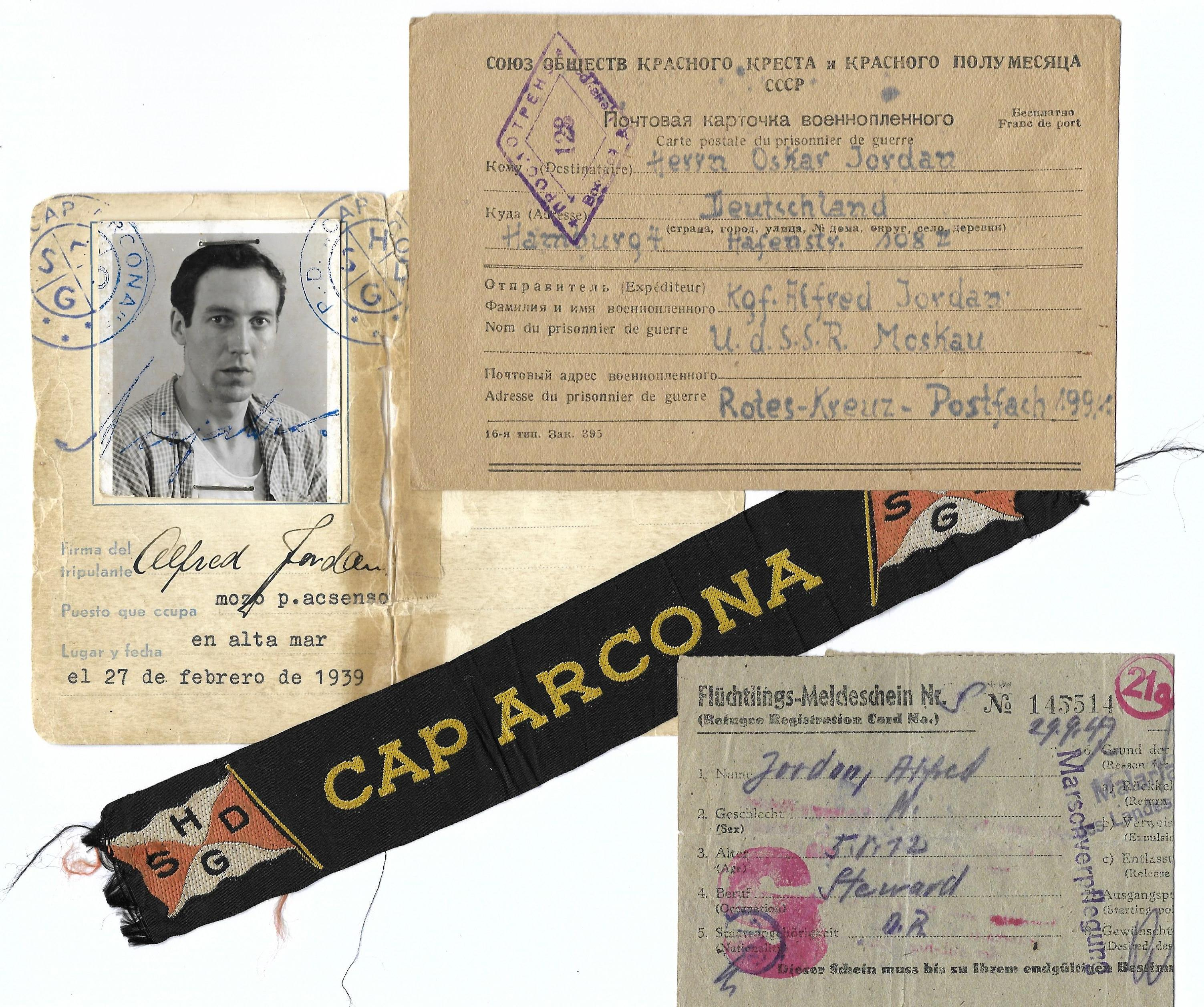
An ID', cap bevo and POW letter used by a former crew member of the SS Cap Arcona

== Prison ship and sinking ==
During March and April 1945, concentration camp prisoners from Scandinavian countries had been transported from all over the German Reich to the Neuengamme concentration camp near Hamburg, in the White Bus programme coordinated through the Swedish Red Cross – with prisoners of other nationalities displaced to make room for them. Eventually Heinrich Himmler agreed that these Scandinavians, and selected others regarded as less harmful to Germany, could be transported through German-occupied Denmark, north to freedom in neutral Sweden. Then between 16 and 28 April 1945, the Neuengamme camp was systematically emptied of all its remaining prisoners, together with other groups of concentration camp inmates and Soviet P.O.W.s; with the intention that they would be relocated to a secret new camp, either on the Baltic Sea island of Fehmarn; or at Mysen in German-occupied Norway where preparations were put in hand to house them under the control of concentration camp guards evacuated from Sachsenhausen. In the interim, they were to be concealed from the advancing British and Canadian military forces from liberated Netherlands, along the North Sea coast, across northern Germany towards Denmark and the Baltic; and for this purpose the SS assembled a prison flotilla of decommissioned ships in the Bay of Lübeck, consisting of the requisitioned former civilian passenger ocean liners S.S. Cap Arcona and Deutschland, the freighter Thielbek, and the motor launch Athen. Since the steering motors were out of use in the S.S. Thielbek and the turbines were out of use on the S.S. Cap Arcona, so then the smaller S.S. Athen was used to transfer prisoners from Lübeck to the larger vessels and in between ships; they were locked below decks and in the holds, and denied food and medical attention.

On 30 April 1945 the two Swedish ships Magdalena and Lillie Matthiessen, previously employed as support vessels for the White Bus evacuations, made a final rescue trip to the Bay of Lübeck and back. Amongst the prisoners rescued were some transferred from the prison flotilla. On the evening of 2 May 1945 more prisoners, mainly women and children from the Stutthof and Mittelbau-Dora camps were loaded onto barges and brought out to the anchored vessels; although, as the Cap Arcona refused to accept any more prisoners, over eight hundred were returned to the beach at Neustadt in the morning of 3 May, where around five hundred were killed in their barges by machine-gunning, or beaten to death on the beach, their German SS guards then seeking to make their escape unencumbered by "excess baggage".

The order to transfer the prisoners to the prison ships had come from Gauleiter Karl Kaufmann in Hamburg. Marc Buggeln has challenged Kaufmann's subsequent claim that he had been acting on orders from SS Headquarters in Berlin, arguing that the decision in fact resulted from political and business pressures from leading industrialists in Hamburg, who were already at this stage plotting with Kaufmann to hand the city over to approaching British forces undefended and unharmed, and who consequently wished to whitewash away (literally so in the case of the Neuengamme concentration camp) all evidence for the prisoners' former presence within the city and its industries.

By early May however, any relocation plans had been scotched by the rapid British military advance to the Baltic; so the SS leadership, which had moved to Flensburg on 28 April, discussed scuttling the ships with the prisoners still captive aboard. Later, at a war crimes tribunal, Gauleiter Kaufmann claimed that the prisoners were intended to be sent to Sweden, although, as none of the ships carried any exterior Red Cross hospital ship markings, nor were they even seaworthy, this was scarcely credible. Georg-Henning Graf von Bassewitz-Behr, Hamburg's last Higher SS and Police Leader (HSSPF), testified at the same trial that the prisoners were in fact to be killed "in compliance with Himmler's orders". Kurt Rickert, who had worked for Bassewitz-Behr, testified at the Hamburg War Crimes Trial that he believed the ships were to be sunk by Kriegsmarine submarine U-boats or Luftwaffe aircraft. Eva Neurath, who was present in Neustadt, and whose husband survived the disaster, said she was told by a police officer that the ships held convicts and were going to be blown up.

On 2 May 1945, the British Second Army discovered the empty camp at Neuengamme, and reached the coastal towns of Lübeck and Wismar. No. 6 Commando, 1st Special Service Brigade commanded by Brigadier Derek Mills-Roberts, and the 11th Armoured Division, commanded by Major-General Philip Roberts, entered Lübeck without resistance. Lübeck contained a permanent International Red Cross and Red Crescent offices in its function as a Red Cross port, and Mr. De Blonay of the International Committee of the Red Cross informed Major-General Roberts that 7,000 to 8,000 prisoners were aboard ships off-shore in the Bay of Lübeck.

On 3 May 1945, three days after Nazi German dictator Hitler's suicide in Berlin, and only one day before the unconditional surrender of the German troops in northwestern Germany at Lüneburg Heath to British Army commander Field Marshal Bernard Law Montgomery (1887–1976), S.S. Cap Arcona, S.S. Thielbek, and the passenger liner S.S. Deutschland were attacked as part of general strikes on shipping in the Baltic Sea by Royal Air Force (R.A.F.) Hawker Typhoon fighter warplanes of No. 83 Expeditionary Air Group of the 2nd Tactical Air Force. Through secret code-breaking of Ultra Intelligence, the Western Allies had become aware that most of the Nazi German SS leadership and former concentration camp commandants had gathered with Heinrich Himmler in Flensburg, hoping to contrive an escape northward to remaining German-occupied Norway. The western allies had intercepted orders from Hitler's designated successor with the rump Grand Admiral Karl Dönitz government, also at Flensburg, that the SS leadership were to be facilitated in escaping Allied capture – or otherwise issued with false Kriegsmarine naval uniforms to conceal their identities – as Admiral Dönitz sought, while surrendering, to maintain the fiction that his administration had been free from involvement in the concentration camps, or in Hitler's policies of genocide and the revealing Holocaust.

The British R.A.F. military aircraft were from the units of No. 184 Squadron, No. 193 Squadron, No. 263 Squadron, No. 197 Squadron RAF, and No. 198 Squadron. Besides four 20 mm cannon, these Hawker Typhoon Mark 1B fighter-bombers carried either eight HE "60-lb" RP-3 unguided rockets or two 500 lb (230 kg) bombs.

None of the prison flotilla were painted / marked with Red Cross symbols (although the Deutschland had previously been intended as a hospital ship, and retained one white painted funnel with a red cross), and all prisoners were concealed below deck, so the pilots in the attacking force were unaware that they were laden with concentration camp survivors. Although Swedish and Swiss Red Cross officials had informed British intelligence on 2 May 1945 of the presence of large numbers of prisoners on ships at anchor in Lübeck Bay, this vital information was not passed on. (Note: From the Till report of June 1945: "The Intelligence Officer with the 83 Air Group of the R.A.F. has admitted on two occasions; first to Lt H. F. Ansell of this Team (when it was confirmed by a Wing Commander present), and on a second occasion to the Investigating Officer when he was accompanied by Lt. H. F. Ansell, that a message was received on 2 May 1945 that these ships were loaded with Konzentrationslager (KZ) prisoners, but that, although there was ample time to warn the pilots of the military planes who attacked these ships on the following day, by some oversight the message was never passed on... From the facts and from the statement volunteered by the R.A.F, Intelligence Officer, it appears that the primary responsibility for this great loss of life must fall on the British R.A.F. command personnel who failed to pass to the fighter pilots the message they received concerning the presence of KZ prisoners on board these ships." See: Jacobs and Pool, 2004 and Till, 1945.) The R.A.F. commanders ordering the strike believed that a flotilla of ships was being prepared in Lübeck Bay, to accommodate leading SS personnel fleeing to German-controlled Norway in accordance with Admiral Dönitz's orders. "The ships are gathering in the area of Lübeck and Kiel. At S.H.A.E.F. (Supreme Headquarters Allied Expeditionary Force, commanded by Gen. Dwight D. Eisenhower), it is believed that important Nazis who have escaped from Berlin to Flensburg are onboard, and are fleeing to Norway or neutral countries".

Equipped with lifejackets from locked storage compartments, most of the SS guards managed to jump overboard from S.S. Cap Arcona. German trawlers sent to rescue Cap Arcona's crew members and guards managed to save 16 sailors, 400 German SS men, and 20 SS women. Only 350 of the 5,000 former concentration camp inmates aboard Cap Arcona survived. From 2,800 prisoners on board the S.S. Thielbek only 50 were saved; whereas all 2,000 prisoners on the S.S. Deutschland were safely taken off onto the S.S. Athen, before the Deutschland capsized.

R.A.F. Pilot Allan Wyse of No. 193 Squadron recalled, "We used our cannon fire at the chaps in the water... we shot them up with 20 mm cannons in the water. Horrible thing, but we were told to do it and we did it. That's war."

Severely damaged and set on fire, the Cap Arcona eventually capsized. Photos of the burning ships, listed as Deutschland, Thielbek, and Cap Arcona, and of the emaciated prisoner survivors swimming in the very cold Baltic Sea waters, around 7 °C (45 °F), were taken on a reconnaissance mission over the Bay of Lübeck by F-6 Mustang (the photo-reconnaissance version of the P-51) of the Allied United States Army Air Forces (USAAF)'s 18th / 161st Tactical Reconnaissance Squadron around 1700 hrs, shortly after the attack.

In the afternoon of 3 May 1945, the British 5th reconnaissance regiment advanced northwards to Neustadt, witnessing the ships burning off-shore in the bay and rescuing some severely emaciated prisoners on the beach at Neustadt, but otherwise finding mostly the bodies of women and children who had died that morning.

On 4 May 1945, a British reconnaissance plane also took photos of the two wrecks, Thielbek and Cap Arcona. With the Bay of Neustadt being shallow, the capsized hulk of Cap Arcona later drifted ashore, and the remains of the beached wreck was finally broken up and scrapped four years later in 1949. For weeks after the attack, bodies of victims washed ashore, where they were collected and buried in mass graves at Neustadt in Holstein, Scharbeutz and Timmendorfer Strand. Parts of skeletons washed ashore occasionally over the next 30 years, with the last casualty find occurring in 1971.

The prisoners aboard the ships were of at least 30 different nationalities: American, Belarusian, Belgian, Canadian, Czechoslovak, Danish, Dutch, Estonian, Finnish, French, German, Greek, Hungarian, Italian, Latvian, Lithuanian, Luxembourger, Norwegian, Polish, Romanian, Russian, Serbian, Spanish, Swedish, Swiss, Ukrainian, and possibly others.

== Gallery ==
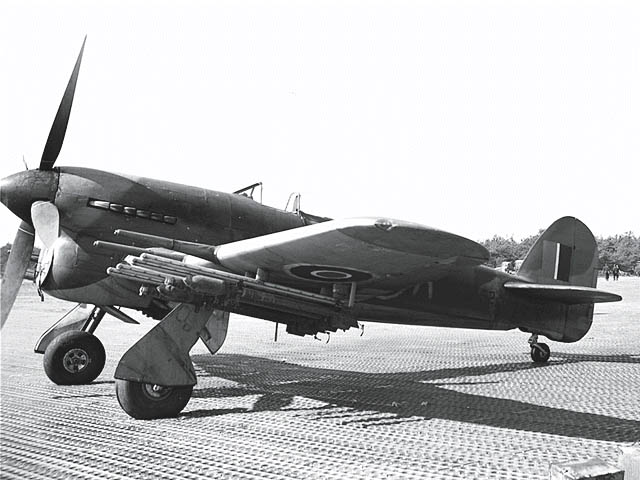
Hawker Typhoon fighter warplane, armed with 60lb RP-3 rockets and cannon.

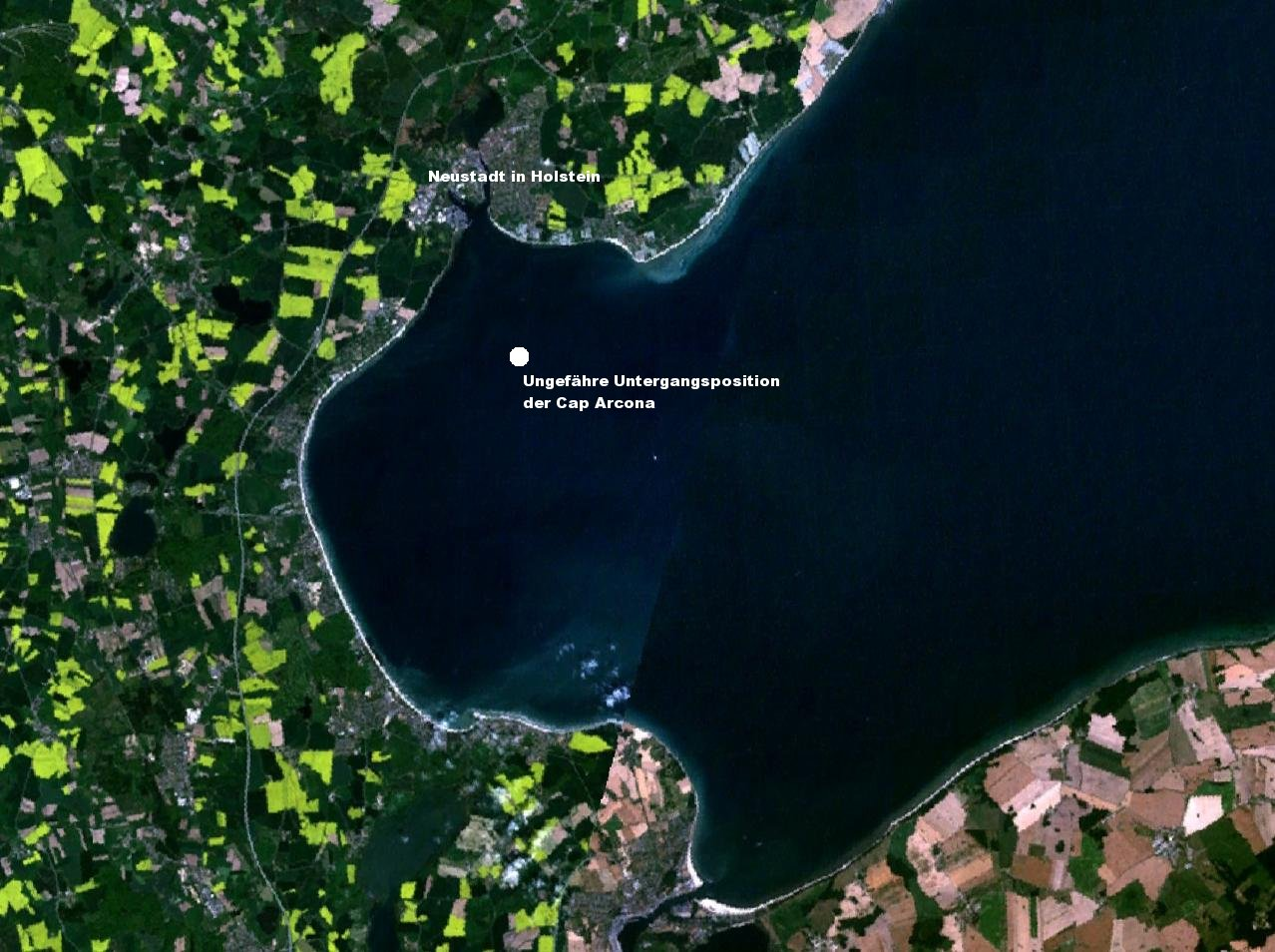
Bay of Lübeck, 3 kilometres (2 mi) from Neustadt in Holstein (left at the top): position of the sinking of the S.S. Cap Arcona.

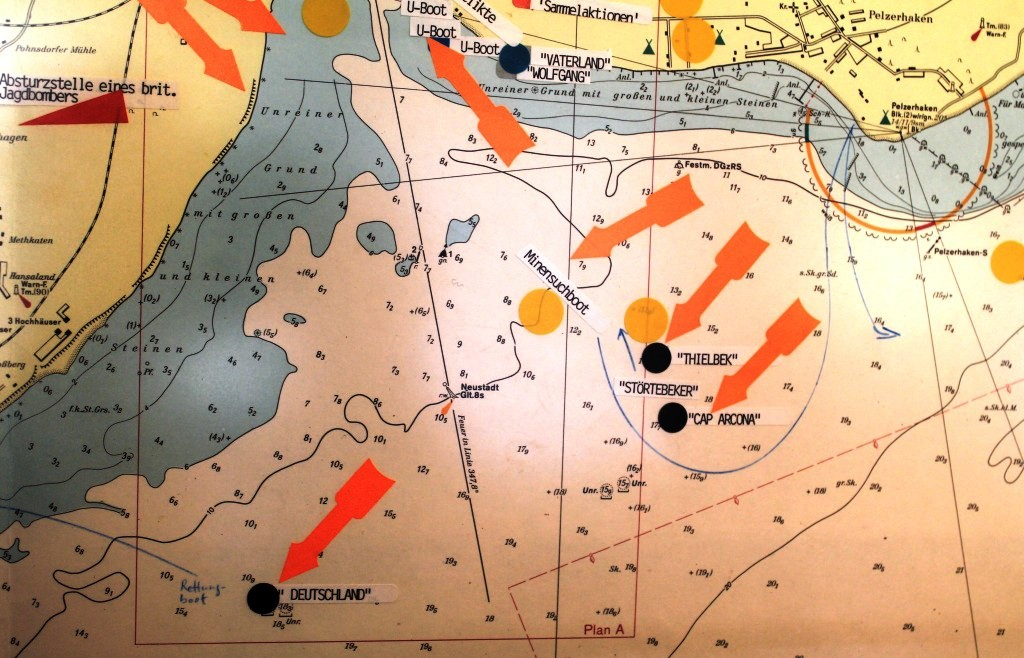
Bay of Lübeck (Baltic Sea): positions of S.S. Cap Arcona, S.S. Thielbek, and S.S. Deutschland prison ships, April 1945.

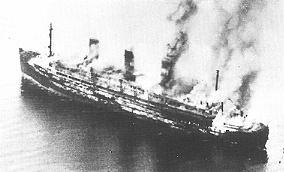
S.S. Cap Arcona burning shortly after the British Royal Air Force aerial attacks and bombings.

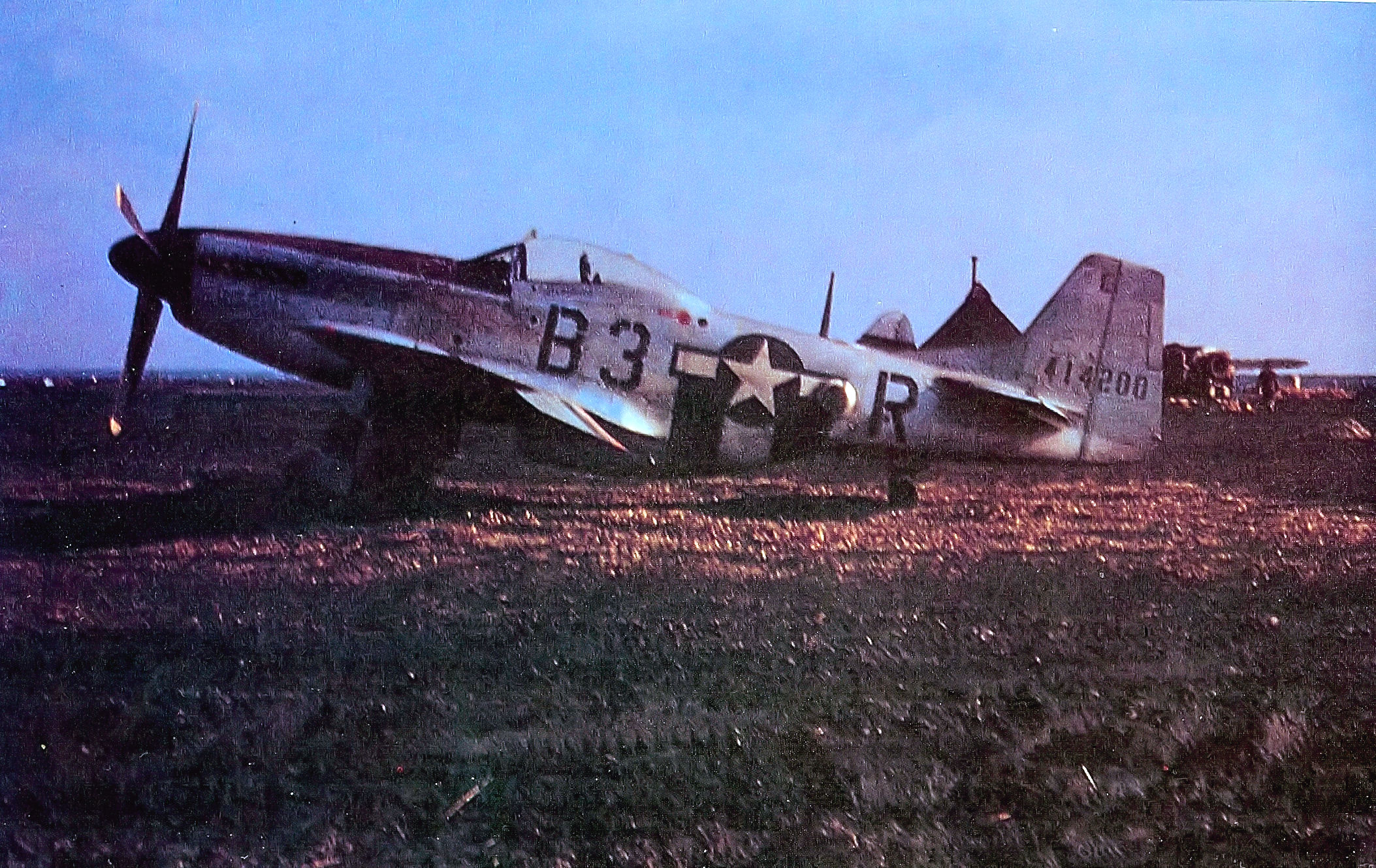
United States Army Air Forces (U.S.A.A.F.) North American F-6A Mustang (reconnaissance version of P-51D Mustang, American military fighter warplane).

== Locations ==
- Cap Arcona: 54°3.9′N 10°50.45′E
- Thielbek: 54°4.3′N 10°50.40′E
- Deutschland: 54°7.5′N 10°48.25′E
- Athen
- Elmenhorst

=== Survivors ===
- Francis Akos (1922–2016), born Weinman Akos Ferencz in Budapest, Hungary; Chicago Symphony Orchestra violinist
- Heinrich Bertram (1897–1956), captain of Cap Arcona
- Emil František Burian (1904–1959), musician and theatrical director, founder of Theatre D, a leading avant-garde theatre in inter-war Europe
- Erwin Geschonneck (1906–2008), who later became a German actor, and whose story was made into a feature film in 1982
- Ernst Goldenbaum (1898–1990), German Democratic Republic (D.D.R./G.D.R.) - East German (Communist) politician
- Benjamin Jacobs (1919–2004) born Berek Jakubowicz in Dobra, Poland; dentist, Holocaust speaker and author
- Philip Jackson (1928–2016), son of an American medical doctor / surgeon, Sumner Jackson, killed in the attacks
- Hans van Ketwich Verschuur (1905–1995), Dutch Red Cross and Boy Scouting official.
- Heinz Lord (1917–1961), German-American surgeon
- Migdal, André (1924–2007), French resistant, Holocaust speaker and author, poet, survivor of Athen
- Sam Pivnik (1926–2017), art dealer and lecturer on The Holocaust
- Josef Štěrba (1905–1977), (Communist) Czech politician
- Gustaaf Van Essche (1923–1979), Belgian politician

=== Monuments and memorials ===
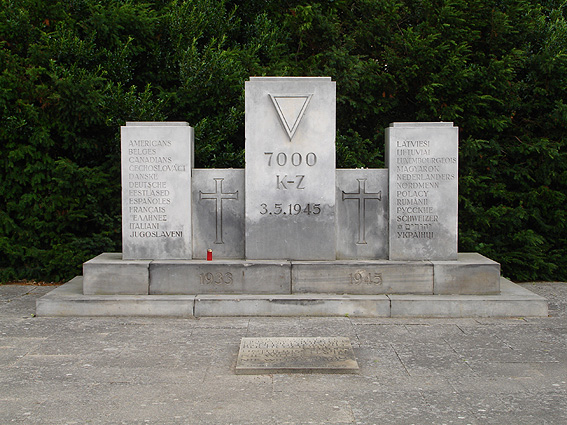
Monument to the Cap Arcona and Thielbek victims at Neustadt in Holstein

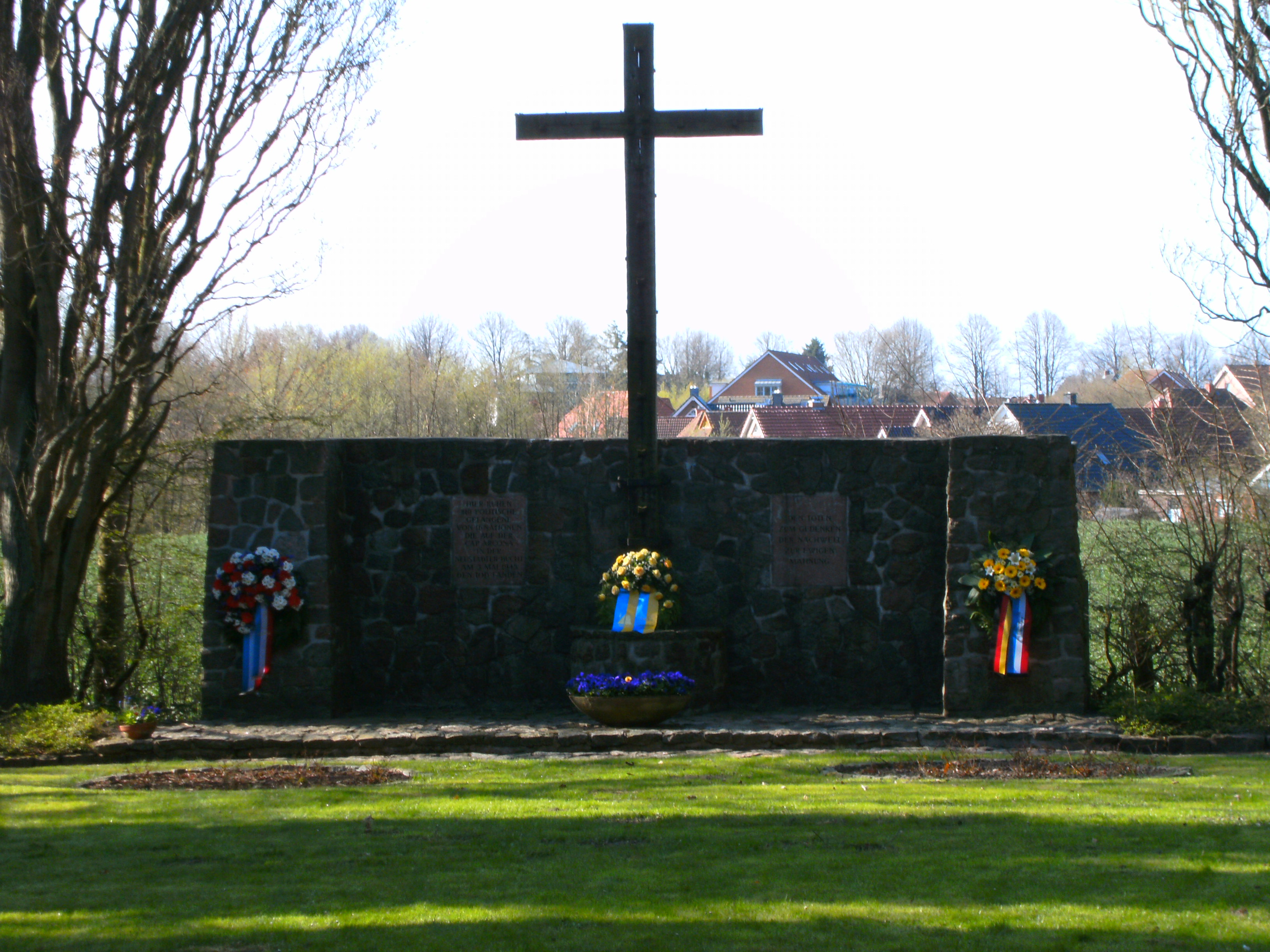
Monument in the Waldfriedhof at Timmendorfer Strand to 810 victims of Cap Arcona

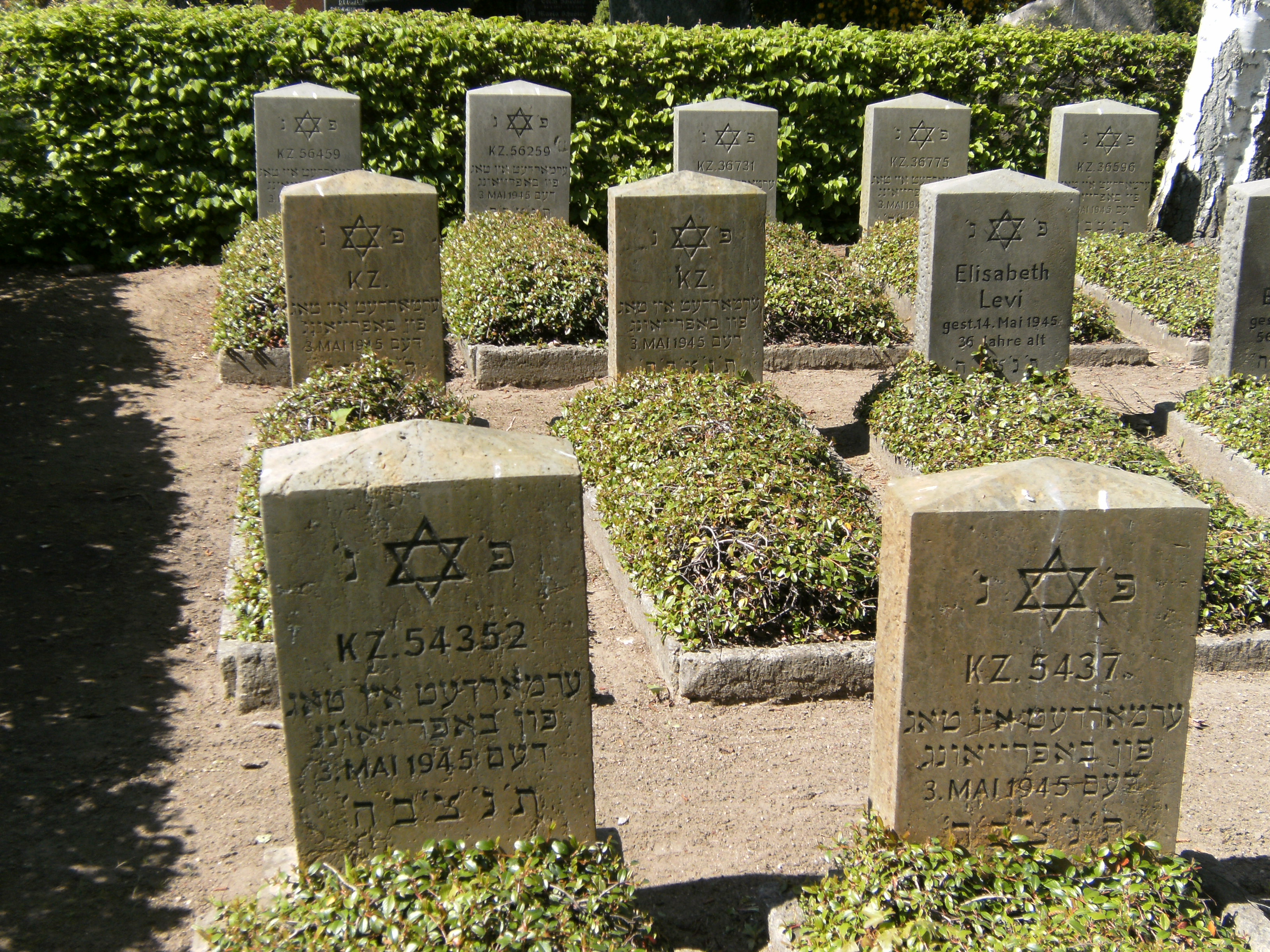
Jewish cemetery in Neustadt in Holstein for 100 Jewish victims of Cap Arcona

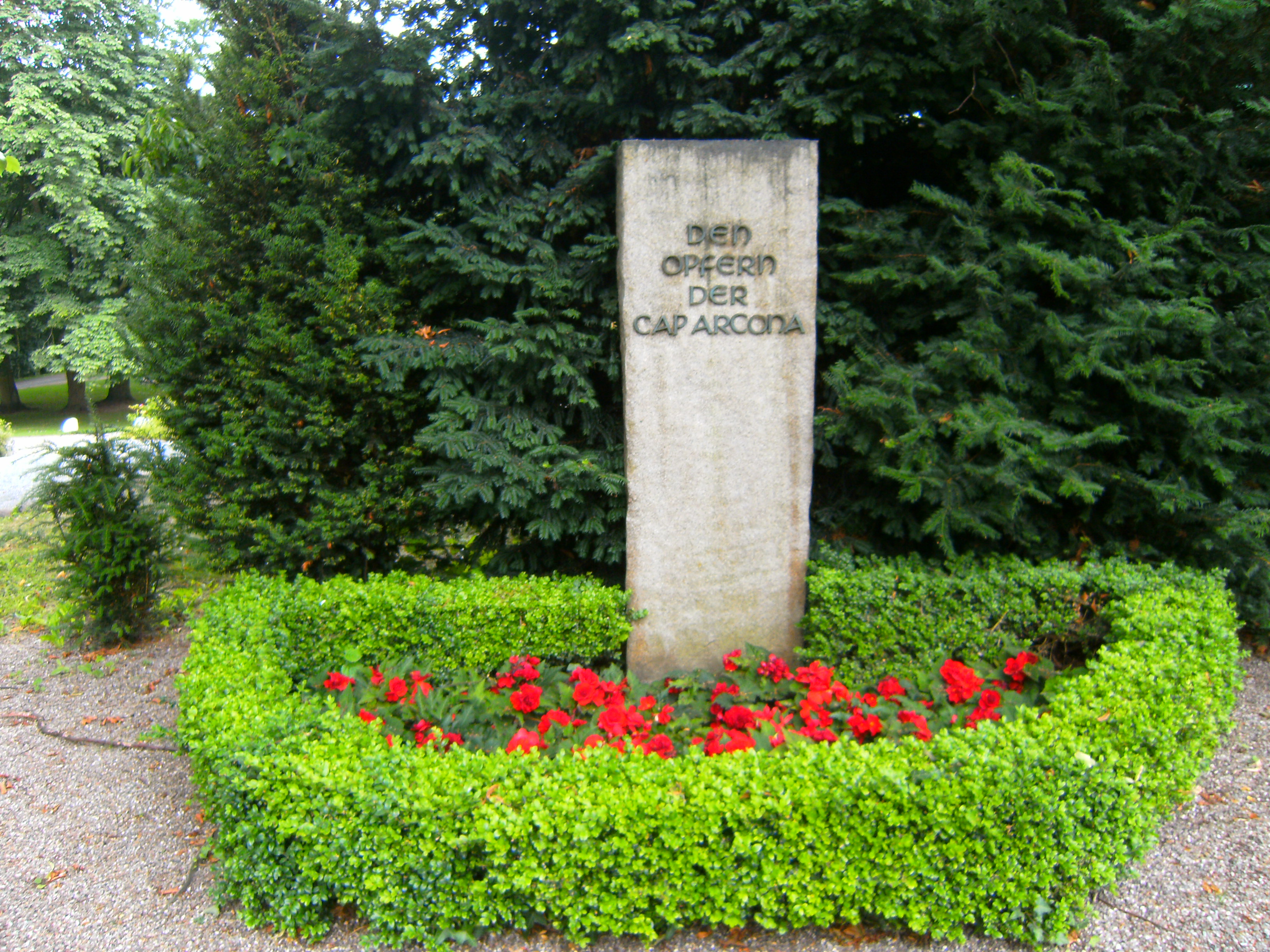
Monument to 91 victims of Cap Arcona in the cemetery of St Nicolas' church in Grömitz

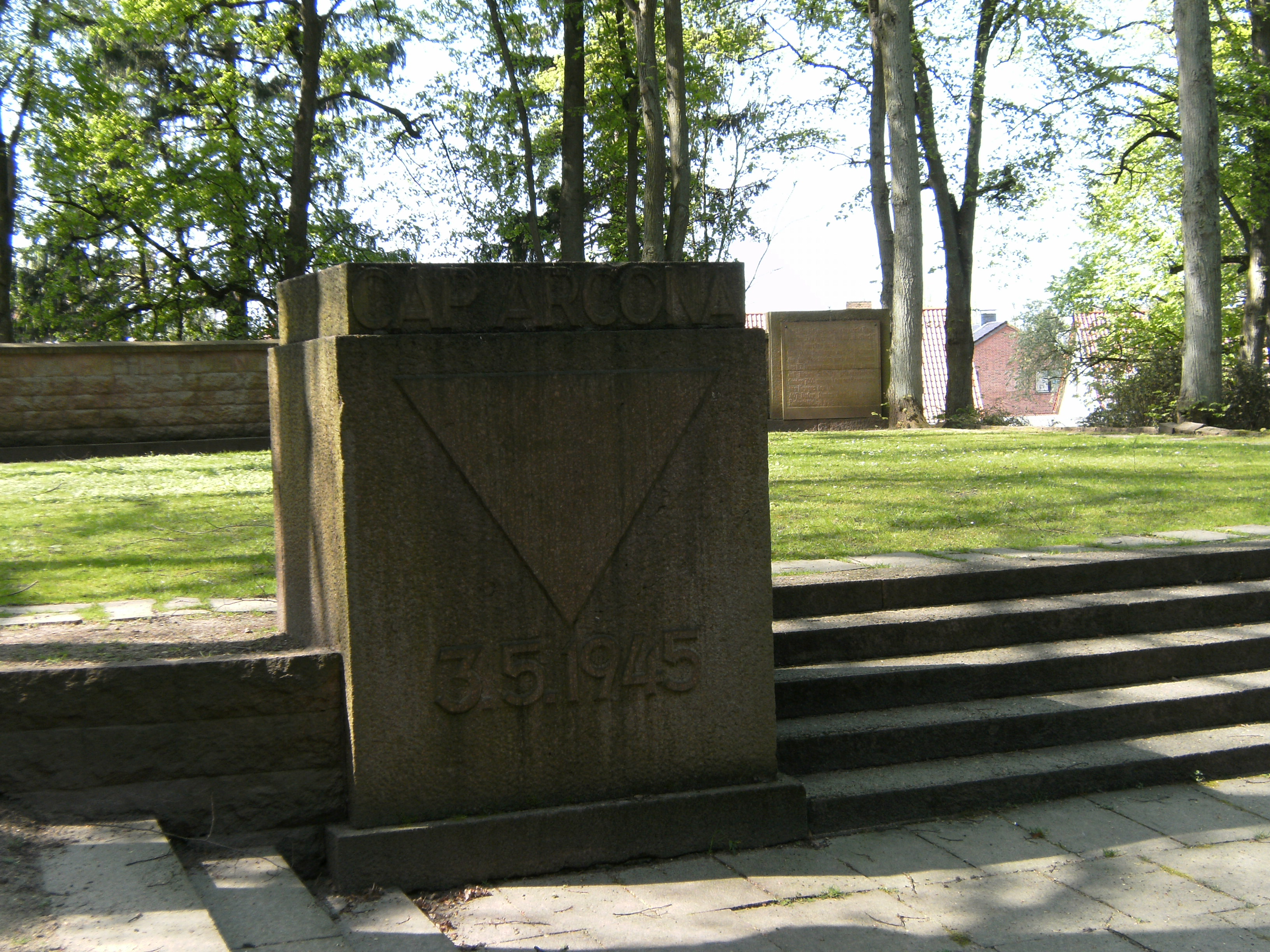
Cemetery and monument in Grevesmühlen for 407 victims of Cap Arcona

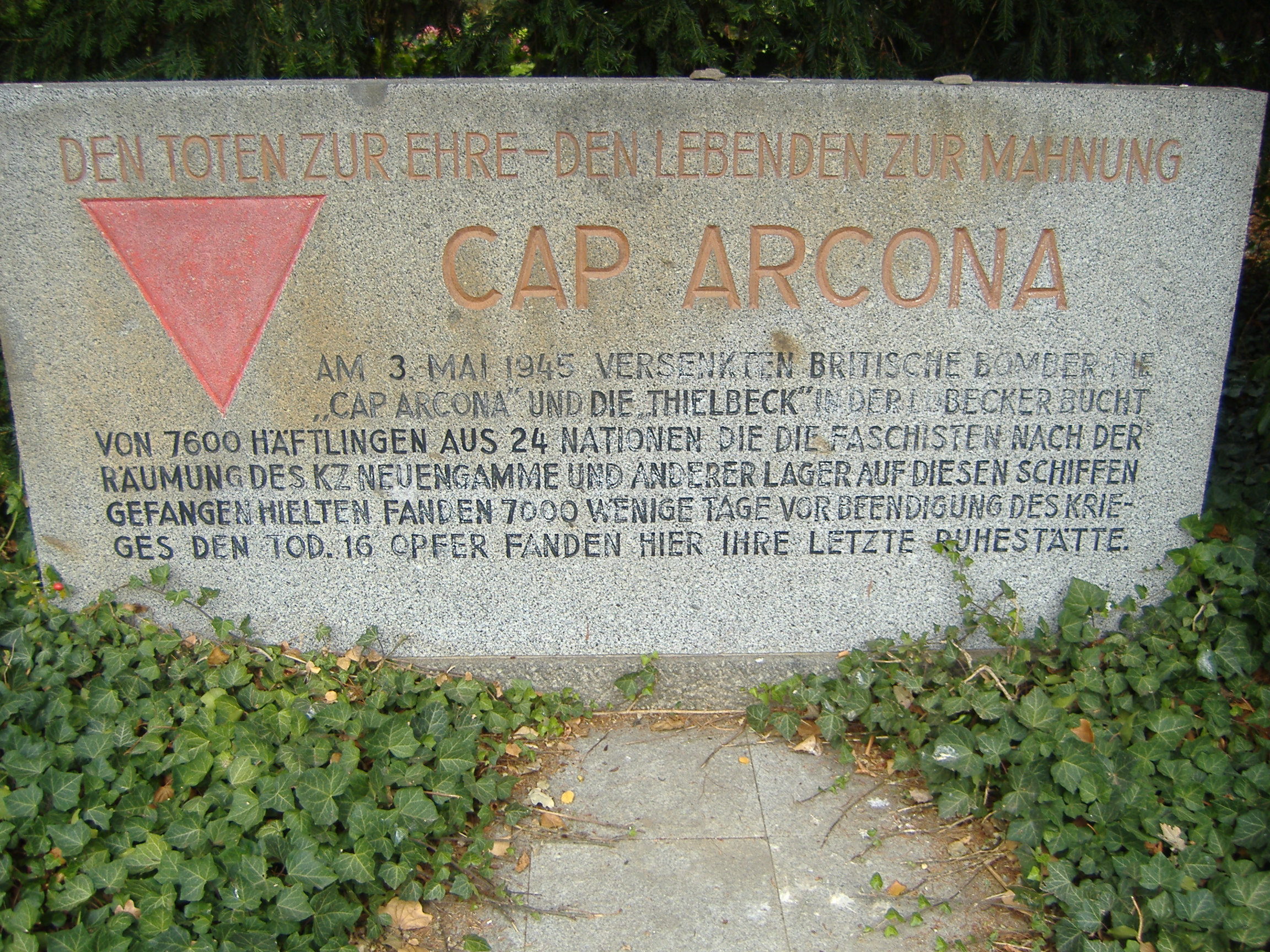
Monument to victims of Cap Arcona in Klütz
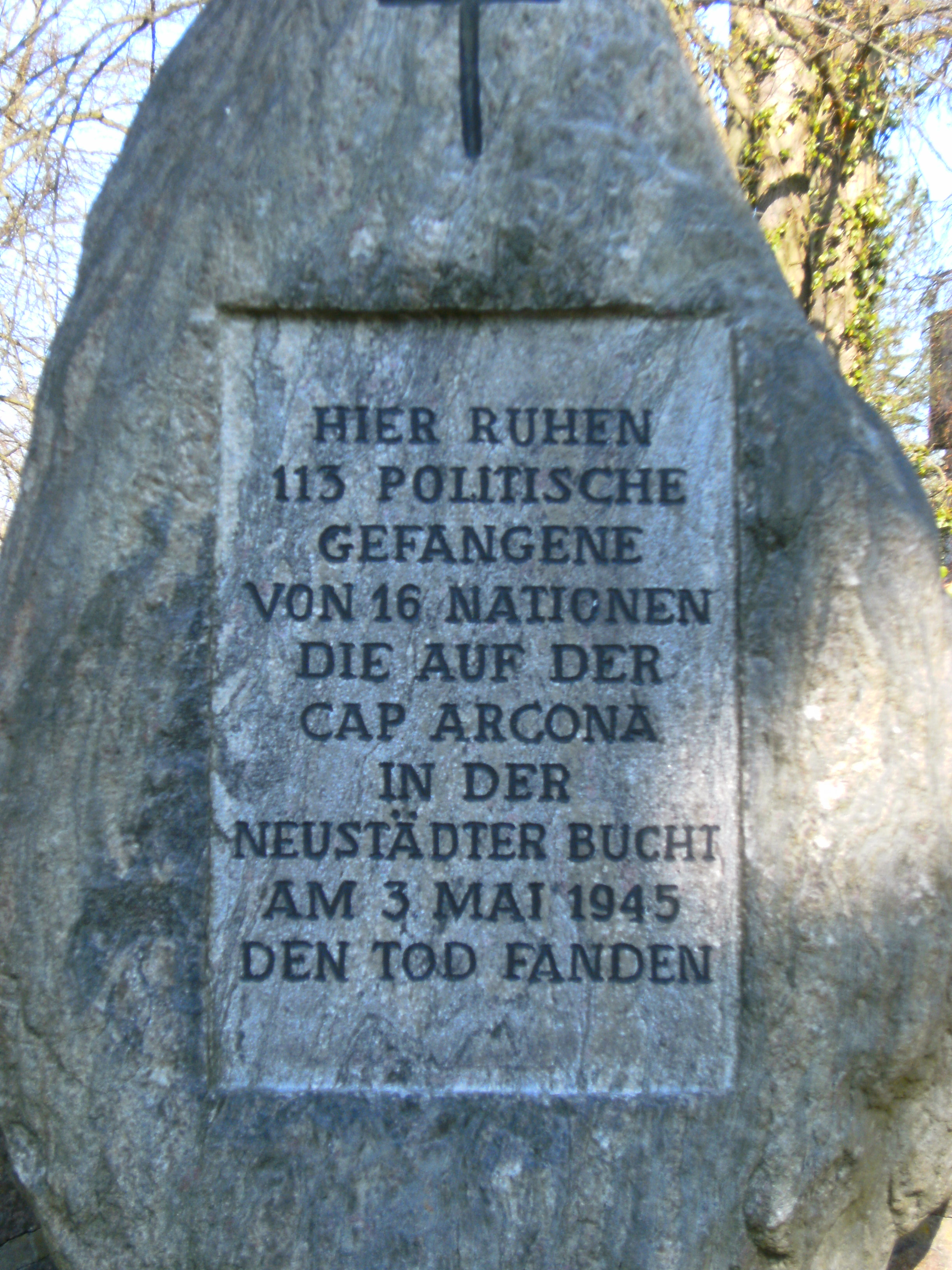
Monument in the cemetery of Niendorf in Timmendorfer Strand to 113 victims of Cap Arcona

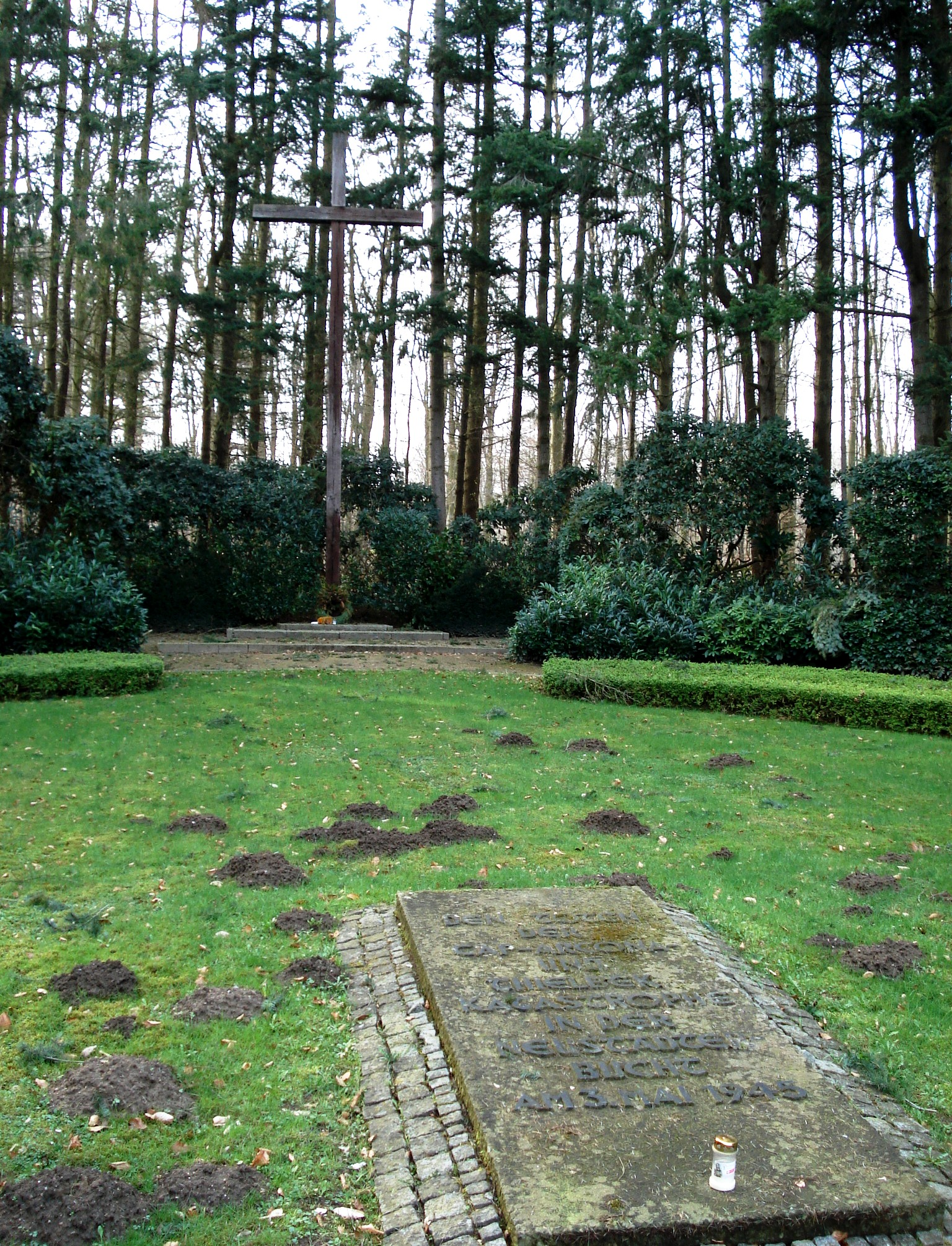
Memorial plaque in the "honour cemetery" near Haffkrug

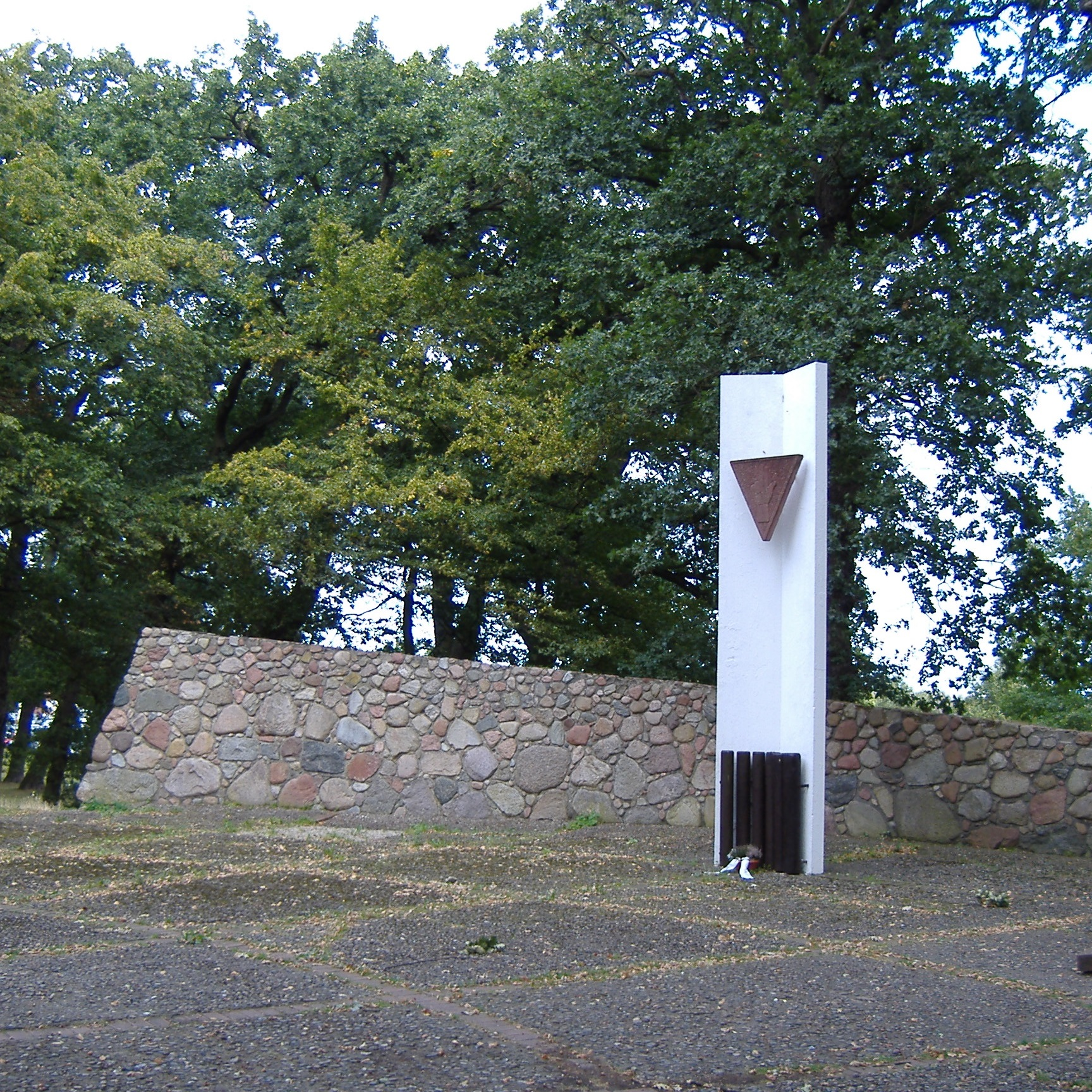
Monument to victims of Cap Arcona on Poel Island

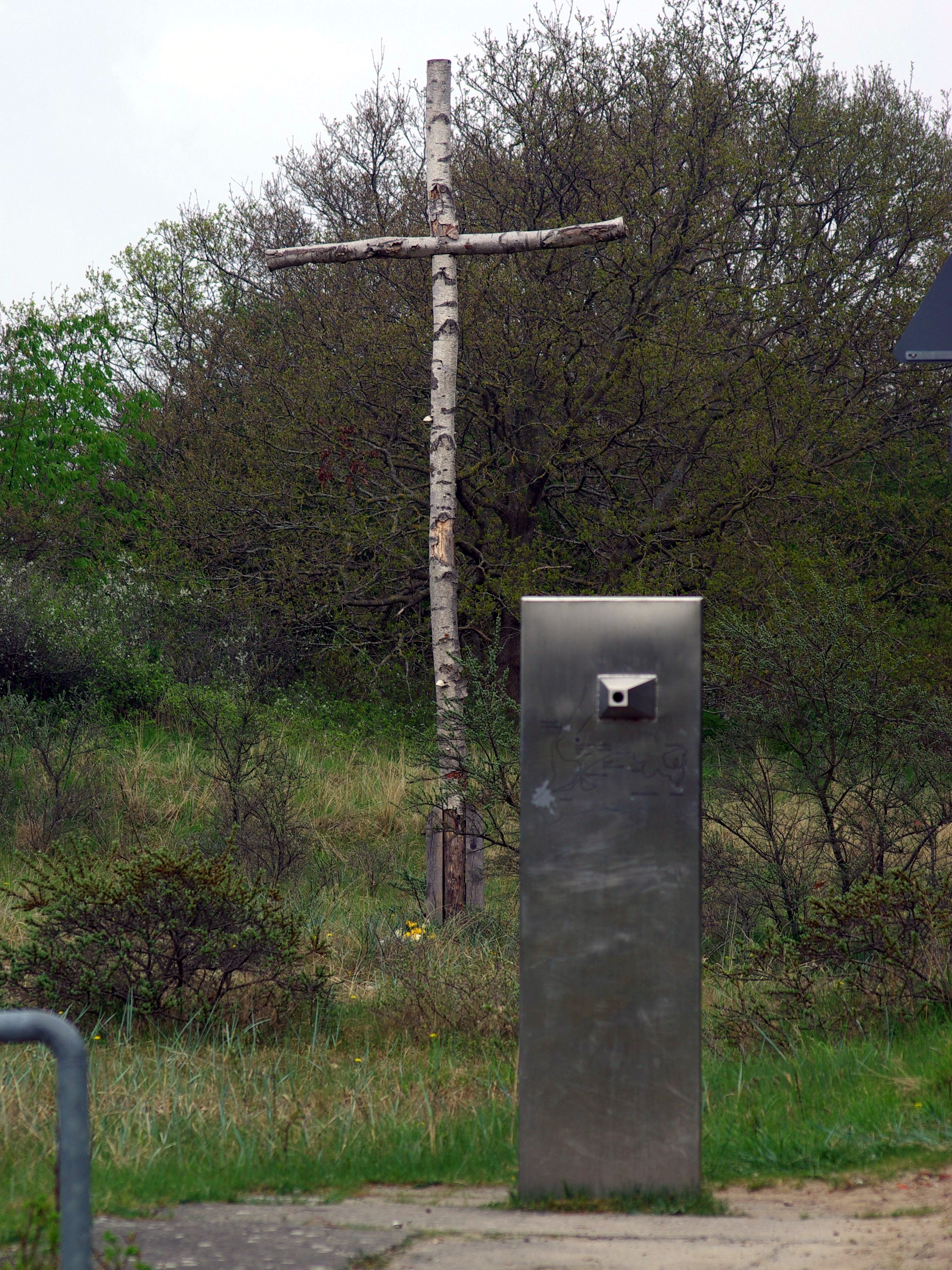
Monument to victims of Cap Arcona at Groß Schwansee near Kalkhorst

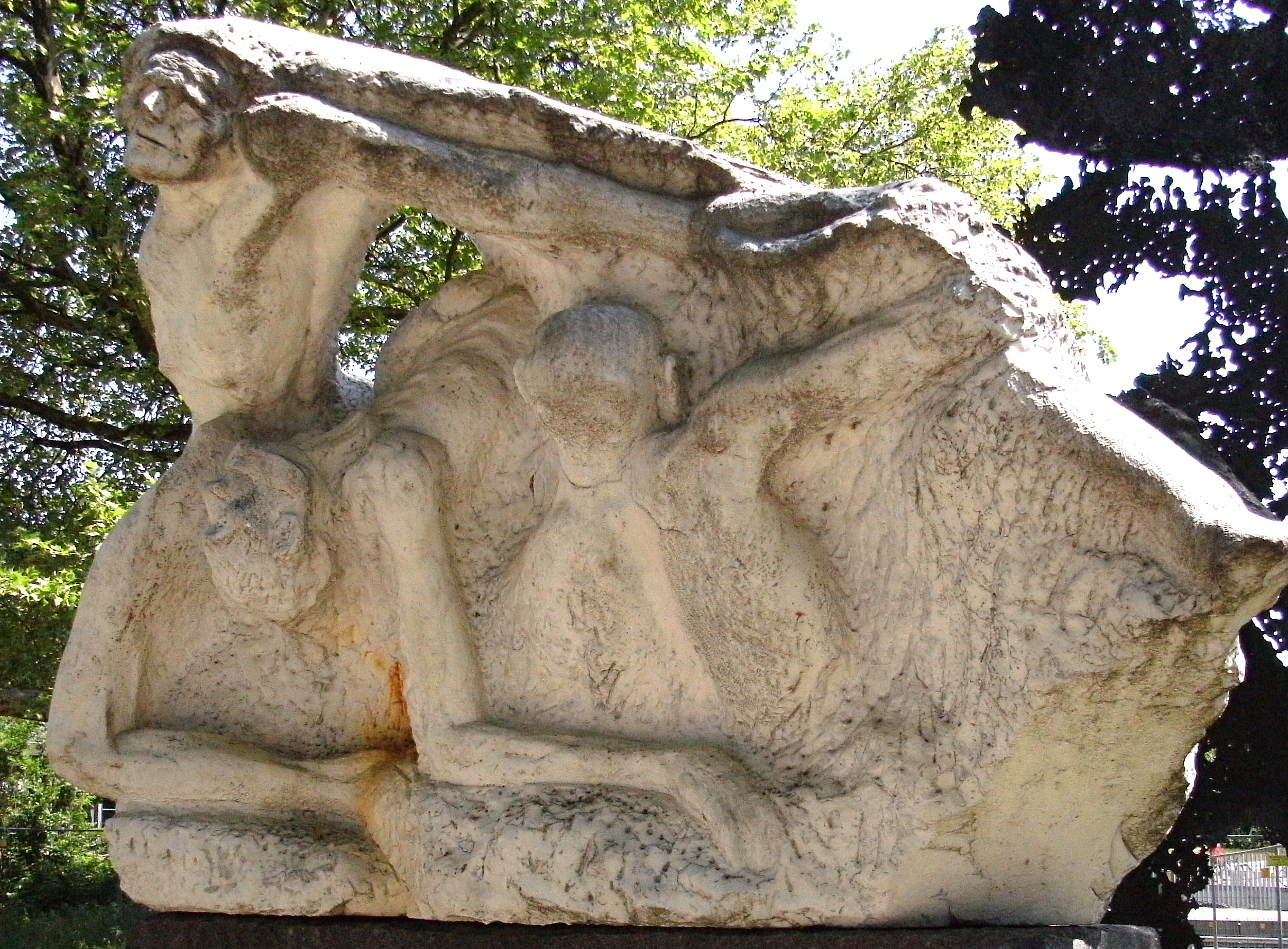
Detail of the memorial against the war (1985/86) by Alfred Hrdlicka, a counter-monument to the Memorial of the Reserve-Infanterie-Regiment Nr. 76 (1936) by Richard Kuöhl in Hamburg

== In popular culture ==
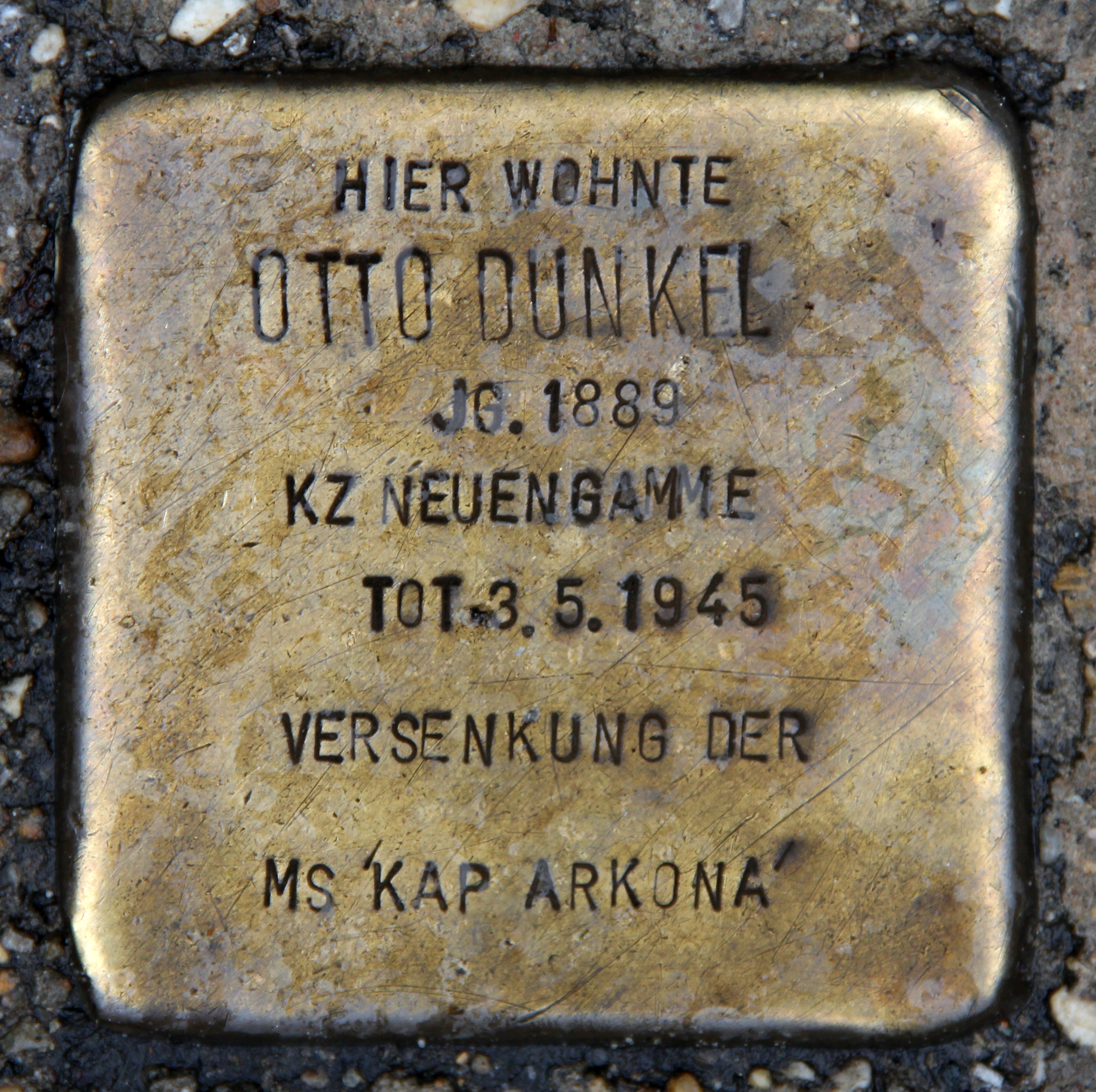
Example of "Stolperstein" (stumbling block) in Berlin-Niederschöneweide, Germany

- Typhoons' Last Storm, Lawrence Bond, 2000.
- The Cap Arcona case, Günther Klaucke, Karl Hermann, 1995.
- Der Mann von der Cap Arcona, GDR TV movie, Erwin Geschonneck's account of the sinking of Cap Arcona, 1981/82.
- De ramp met de Cap Arcona, 2011.
- Sonny Boy, Dutch film, 2011.
- Nazi Titanic: Revealed, Channel 5 Documentary, 2012.
- Mussche, Kirmen Uribe, 2012.

== See also ==
- MV Wilhelm Gustloff
- Titanic (1943 film)
- List of maritime disasters
- List of maritime disasters in World War II
- List of shipwrecks
- List of sealed archives
