= SS Thielbek (1940) =

German cargo steamship which was sunk, repaired, and renamed multiple times (1940-74)

Coordinates: 54°04′18″N 10°50′24″E

- SS Thielbek

History
- Name: Thielbek (1940–45); Reinbek (1949–61); Magdalene (1961–65); Old Warrior (1966–74)
- Operator: Knöhr and Burchard (1940–61)
- Port of registry: (Nazi Germany) Hamburg (1940–45); (West Germany) Hamburg (1949–61); Panama (1961–74)
- Builder: Lübecker Maschinenbau AG
- Yard number: 382
- Launched: 1940
- Fate: Sunk by air raid, 3 May 1945; Raised 1949; Scrapped 1974

General characteristics
- Tonnage: 2,815 GRT
- Length: 105 m (344 ft)
- Beam: 14.7 m (48 ft)
- Propulsion: 2-cylinder compound steam engine
- Speed: 11 kn (20 km/h)

Thielbek was a 2,815 GRT cargo steamship that was built in Germany in 1940, sunk in an air raid in 1945, refloated in 1949 and repaired, and was in service until 1974. Lübecker Maschinenbau Gesellschaft in Lübeck built the ship in 1940 for the Knöhr and Burchard shipping company of Hamburg. In 1961 Knöhr and Burchard sold the ship to buyers who used the name Magdalene and registered the vessel in Panama. In 1965, the ship was renamed Old Warrior and was scrapped in Yugoslavia in 1974.

Thielbek is notable for having been sunk by RAF aircraft on 3 May 1945, killing 2,750 people aboard. The ship was at anchor in the Bay of Lübeck with the passenger ships Cap Arcona and the Deutschland, which were sunk in the same air raid. At the time Cap Arcona and Thielbek were crowded with prisoners from the Neuengamme, Stutthof, and Mittelbau-Dora concentration camps.

== Background ==
On 17 April 1945. Thielbek was told to prepare for a "special operation". The next day the SS summoned Thielbek's Captain John Jacobsen and Cap Arcona's Captain Heinrich Bertram to a conference where they were ordered to embark concentration camp prisoners. Both captains refused, and Jacobsen was relieved of his command.

The order to transfer the prisoners from the camps to the prison ships came from Hamburg Gauleiter Karl Kaufmann acting on orders from Berlin. Kaufmann later claimed during a War Crimes Tribunal that the prisoners were destined for Sweden, but at the same trial Georg-Henning Graf von Bassewitz-Behr, the Higher SS and Police Leader (HSSPF) of Hamburg, said that the prisoners were to be killed on Himmler's orders.

Embarkation of prisoners began on 20 April, with the Swedish Red Cross present. The ship's water supply was insufficient for so many people and 20 to 30 prisoners died daily. The prisoners, with the exception of political prisoners, remained aboard for two or three days before being transferred to Cap Arcona by the cargo ship Athen.

== Sinking ==
Between the two attacks on Cap Arcona, nine Hawker Typhoon aircraft of No. 198 Squadron RAF stationed at Plantlünne attacked Thielbek and Deutschland, five aircraft firing rockets at Deutschland and 4 at Thielbek. Numerous cannon shells and 32 rockets were fired at Thielbek. The ship caught fire, developed a 30 degree list to starboard, and sank 20 minutes after being attacked. Of the 2,800 prisoners aboard Thielbek, only 50 survived the attack.

== Subsequent career ==
In 1949, four years after sinking, Thielbek was refloated. Human remains found aboard the ship were buried in the Cap Arcona cemetery at Neustadt in Holstein. The ship remained in Knöhr and Burchard service until 1961 when sold, renamed Magdalene, and registered under the Panamanian flag of convenience. In 1965, the ship was renamed Old Warrior and was scrapped in Split, Yugoslavia, in 1974.

== See also ==
- List of maritime disasters
- SS Cap Arcona
- Soviet hospital ship Armenia
- RMS Laconia
- SS General von Steuben
- Junyō Maru
- HMT Rohna
- Ukishima Maru
- MV Wilhelm Gustloff
- Sumner Jackson
