= SS Deutschland (1923) =

German ocean liner steamship (1923-45)

Coordinates: 54°07′30″N 10°48′15″E

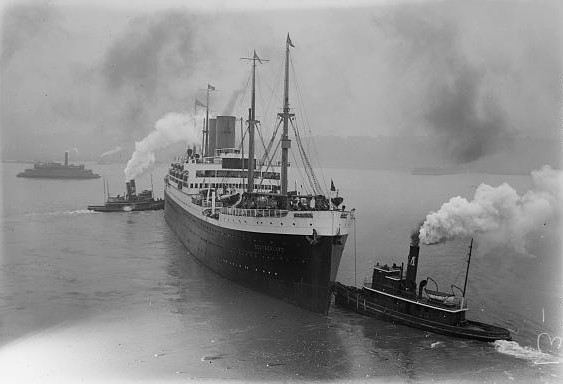
- The SS Deutschland

History

Weimar Republic
- Name: Deutschland
- Owner: Hamburg-America Line
- Port of registry: Germany
- Route: Hamburg to New York
- Ordered: 1921
- Builder: Blohm+Voss, Kommandit Ges auf Aktien, Hamburg, Germany
- Launched: 28 April 1923
- Maiden voyage: 27 March 1924
- Home port: Hamburg, Germany
- Fate: Transferred to the Kriegsmarine in 1940.
- Notes: Paintwork: black hull; red boot-topping; upper works white; funnels buff with red, white and black tops

Nazi Germany
- Name: Deutschland
- Acquired: 1940
- Fate: Capsized and sank on 3 May 1945 as a result of a British air attack.

General characteristics
- Type: Ocean liner
- Tonnage: 21,046 GRT
- Length: 196.6 m (645 ft 0 in) overall
- Beam: 22 m (72 ft 2 in)
- Depth: 12.8 m (42 ft 0 in)
- Decks: 4
- Installed power: 8 steam turbines
- Propulsion: Twin screw
- Speed: 20 knots (37 km/h; 23 mph)
- Complement: 976 passengers
- Crew: 422 officers and crew

SS Deutschland (Note: Sometimes called Deutschland IV to distinguish from others of the name) was a 21,046 gross register tons (GRT) German ocean liner of the HAPAG line. It was sunk in a British air attack on May 3, 1945.

== History ==
=== Commissioning ===
One of a group of four ships that included the Albert Ballin, Hamburg, and New York, the Deutschland was launched on 28 April 1923. She began her maiden voyage on 27 March 1924, to Southampton and then on to New York City. The turbine-powered ship had a speed of 14.5 knots (26.9 km/h; 16.7 mph); she was later re-engined with larger-geared turbines in 1929, with service speed increased to 19 knots (35 km/h; 22 mph). This gave the ship a seven-day passage across the Atlantic.

On 17 November 1933, Deutschland collided with the American cargo ship SS Munargo in New York Harbor. Munargo suffered severe damage and was beached north of Bedloe's Island, but was refloated on 18 November 1933.

In October 1938, while en route to New York with 981 persons aboard the ship suffered an explosion in her Number Two hold. After calling for assistance, the crew was able to bring the fire under control and continue on her itinerary.

=== World War II ===
In 1940, Deutschland became an accommodation ship for the German Navy at Gotenhafen. In 1945, on seven Baltic voyages as part of Operation Hannibal, she carried 70,000 refugees from the German eastern territories to the west.

=== Sinking ===
In April 1945, her conversion into a hospital ship was begun. An attempt was made to paint the vessel white, but there was only sufficient paint available to paint her funnels white, and to paint a Red Cross on one side of one of her funnels.

Between 16 and 28 April 1945, the concentration camp of Neuengamme was systematically emptied of all its remaining prisoners, other groups of concentration camp inmates and Soviet prisoners of war (POWs); with the intention that they would be relocated to a secret new camp. In the interim, they were to be concealed from the advancing British and Canadian forces; and for this purpose the Schutzstaffel assembled a prison flotilla of decommissioned ships in the Bay of Lübeck, consisting of the liners Cap Arcona and Deutschland, the freighter Thielbek, and the motor launch Athens. Since the steering motors were out of use in Thielbek and the turbines were out of use in Cap Arcona, Athens was used to transfer prisoners from Lübeck to the larger ships and between ships; they were locked below decks and in the holds, and denied food and medical attention.

During the first days of May 1945, thousands of concentration camp inmates were locked below decks and in the holds, and denied food and medical attention. All people on board the Deutschland survived the attack, though two accompanying vessels sank with great loss of life. Subsequently, on 3 May 1945, she was attacked by British Royal Air Force squadrons three times, and sank in the Bay of Lübeck off Neustadt, but everyone aboard survived. A fourth British air attack that day sank the Cap Arcona and Thielbek, with great loss of life.

In 1949, the wreck was raised and scrapped.

== See also ==
- List of maritime disasters
