= Soviet submarine S-55 =

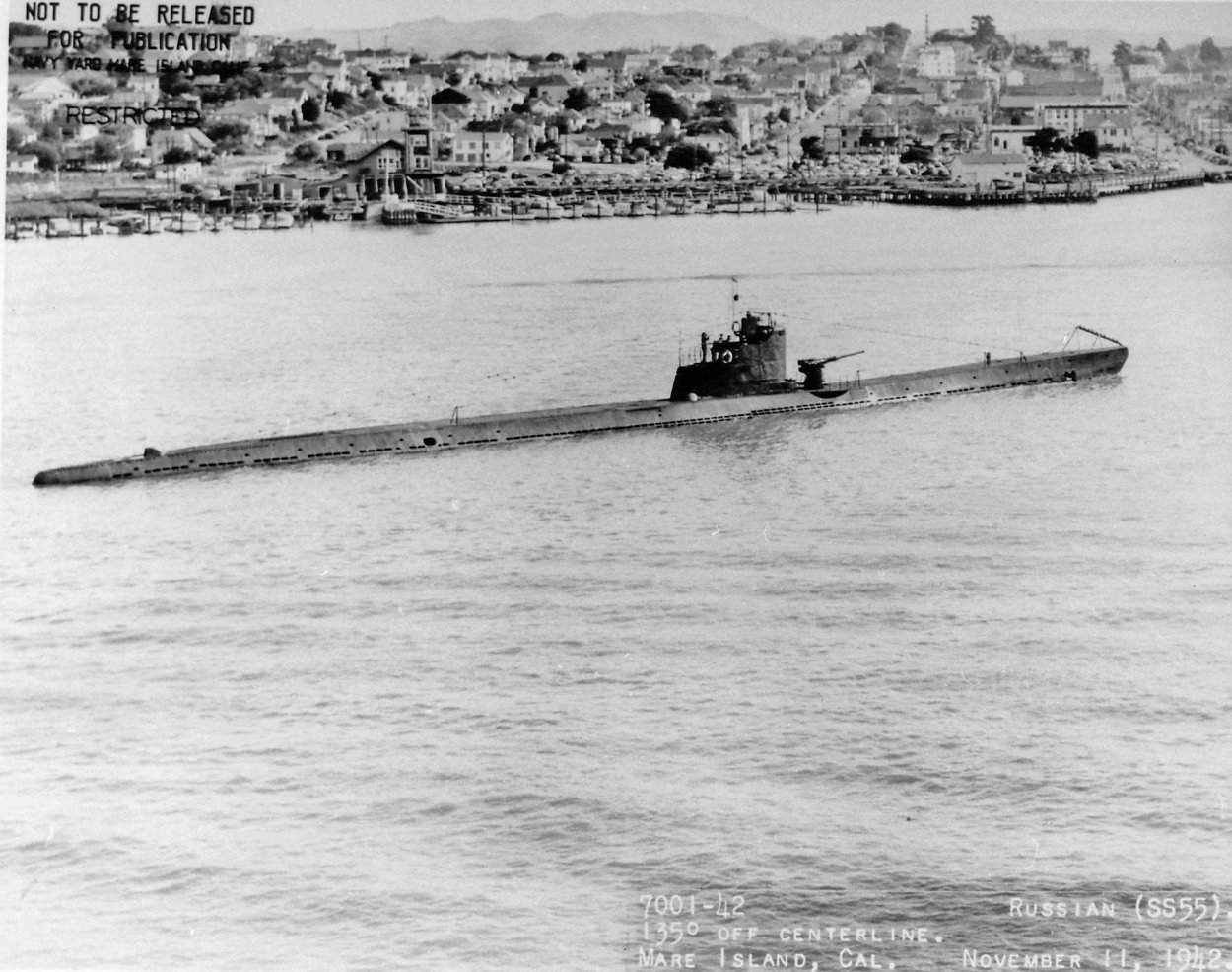
- S-55 at Mare Island Naval Shipyard, California

History

Soviet Union
- Name: S-55
- Builder: Dalzavod, Vladivostok
- Laid down: 24 November 1936
- Launched: 27 November 1939
- Commissioned: 25 July 1941
- Fate: Disappeared in December 1943, sunk by unknown cause

General characteristics
- Class & type: S-class submarine (Series IX-bis)
- Displacement: 856 t (842 long tons) surfaced; 1,090 t (1,070 long tons) submerged
- Length: 77.8 m (255 ft 3 in)
- Beam: 6.4 m (21 ft 0 in)
- Draft: 4 m (13 ft 1 in)
- Propulsion: 2 × diesel engines; 2 × electric motors; 2 × shafts
- Speed: 18.85 knots (34.91 km/h) surfaced; 8.8 knots (16.3 km/h) submerged
- Range: 9,500 nmi (17,600 km)
- Test depth: 80 m (260 ft)
- Complement: 45
- Armament: 6 × torpedo tubes; 2 × deck guns

Service record
- Part of: Pacific Fleet 1st Submarine Brigade; 25 July 1941 – January 1943; Northern Fleet Submarine Brigade; January – December 1943
- Commanders: Kapitan tretego ranga Lev M. Sushkin; 25 July 1941 – December 1943
- Operations: 1st patrol: 28 March – 3 April 1943; 2nd patrol: 22 April – 30 April 1943; 3rd patrol: 30 September – 16 October 1943; 4th patrol: 4 December – December 1943
- Victories: 2 merchant ships sunk (6,089 GRT)

S-55 (Russian: С-55) was an S-class submarine of the Soviet Navy during World War II. At the start of the conflict it was part of the Pacific Fleet in Vladivostok, and it was sent to the Northern Fleet in late 1942, arriving at the Polyarny naval base in early 1943. During the war the submarine carried out four patrols and sank two transport ships before disappearing in December 1943.

== Design ==
The Srednyaya or S-class submarine (Russian: Средняя, lit. 'medium'), also called the Stalinets class (Russian: Сталинец, lit. 'follower of Stalin'), was an ocean-going diesel electric attack submarine. Its pressure hull had seven compartments, and the Series IX-bis submarine's displacement was 856 tonnes (842 long tons) while on the surface and 1,090 tonnes (1,070 long tons) while submerged. It had a length of 77.8 m (255 ft 3 in), a beam of 6.4 metres (21 ft 0 in), and a draft of 4 metres (13 ft 1 in). It had two diesel engines to power it on the surface and two electric motors for when it was submerged, providing 4,000 shaft horsepower (3,000 kW) and 1,100 shaft horsepower (820 kW), respectively, to the two propeller shafts. This gave it a speed of 18.85 knots (34.91 km/h) on the surface and 8.8 knots (16.3 km/h) while underwater, and the submarine had a range of 9,500 nautical miles (17,600 km). Its test depth was 80 metres (260 ft), and as armament it had six 530 mm (21 in) torpedo tubes, one 100 mm (3.9 in) deck gun, and one 45 mm (1.8 in) gun.

S-55 was part of the Series IX-bis, which was a modification of the original three boats of the S-class, the Series IX. The main difference between them was the replacement of German components used in Series IX with Soviet equivalents that could be manufactured domestically.

== Commissioning ==
S-55 was laid down in Leningrad on 24 November 1936 before being delivered by rail to Dalzavod in Vladivostok in 1938, where it was launched on 27 November 1939 and commissioned on 25 July 1941, under the command of Captain 3rd rank Lev M. Sushkin. He remained the captain of S-55 for the rest its career. The boat became part of the 3rd Submarine Squadron of the Pacific Fleet 1st Submarine Brigade.

== Service history ==
On 9 September 1942, S-55 and several other Pacific Fleet submarines were ordered by the Navy Commander-in-Chief, Admiral Nikolai Kuznetsov, to join the Northern Fleet in Polyarny by traveling through the Panama Canal. S-55 left Vladivostok on 5 October 1942 and arrived at Petropavlovsk-Kamchatsky on 16 October, before continuing towards the Aleutian Islands. S-55 arrived at the U.S. naval base in Dutch Harbor, Alaska on the 20th. It and three other boats (S-51, S-54, and S-56) left Dutch Harbor on 28 October with four U.S. Navy destroyers, traveling along the West Coast to California, where they arrived at the Mare Island Naval Shipyard near San Francisco. S-55 stayed there from 5 November until later that month, when the group departed for the Panama Canal, and stopped at the Coco Solo U.S. naval base on the Atlantic coast of Panama. There the submarines received supplies before S-55 and S-54 left together on 3 December for Halifax, Canada, where they spent some time before continuing on the 25th for Britain. In January 1943 they arrived in Rosyth, where S-55 was put in a dry dock and had new electric batteries installed. While this was going on the crew of the submarine stayed on board the cruiser HMS Liverpool.

S-55 left Rosyth together with S-56 in February 1943 and they reached Polyarny on 8 March. After arriving at Polyarny, S-55 became part of the 2nd Submarine Squadron of the Northern Fleet Submarine Brigade and received repairs for several days. It carried out its first mission on 24 March 1943 when it departed from the base to help another submarine that hit a mine, M-174. The damaged vessel was able to make it to back to the base on its own power, and they returned on the following day.

S-55 began its first war patrol on 28 March 1943, going to a position in the Barents Sea off Vardø Municipality. S-55 launched a torpedo at another submarine the next day but it missed its target. Shortly after that, S-55 attacked a convoy of several transport ships, and it fired four torpedoes, though none of them made a hit. During the engagement and on its way back to base the submarine was damaged. It returned to Polyarny on 3 April. The boat went on its second patrol starting on the 22nd of the same month near Nordkapp Municipality. It made an attack on another German convoy in the evening of 29 April, and one of its torpedoes sank the transport Sturzsee (708 tons). After this it was pursued by German warships that dropped depth charges. S-55 took significant damage from explosions that happened close by, but was able to return to Polyarny on 30 April.

From May to September 1943 the submarine underwent repairs, and on 1 July it was transferred to the 5th Squadron of the Submarine Brigade. S-55 began its next patrol on 30 September 1943 off Sværholtklubben. During the patrol, on 12 October, the submarine attacked another convoy and sank the merchant ship Ammerland (5,381 tons). After this, S-55 survived a depth charge attack and returned to base on 16 October.

S-55 left for the Tanafjord area on its fourth patrol on 4 December 1943. It reported arriving at its designated patrol area that evening, and that was the last communication received from the submarine. S-55 was ordered to return to base on 12 December but made no response. What happened to S-55 is unknown, but German records indicate that a convoy in that area was attacked on 8 December 1943 by a submarine. It is speculated that it could have been destroyed by German submarine chasers or hit a naval mine. S-55 was presumed lost at sea with its entire crew of 52 men, and the Soviet Navy struck S-55 from the naval list on 18 January 1944. As of 2024 the location of its wreck and its exact fate is unknown.

=== Summary ===
Ships sunk by S-55
Date	Ship	Flag	Tonnage	Notes
29 April 1943	Sturzsee	Germany	708 GRT	torpedo
12 October 1943	Ammerland	Germany	5,381 GRT	torpedo
Total:			6,089 GRT	

== Bibliography ==
- Budzbon, Przemysław (1980). "Soviet Union". In Chesneau, Roger (ed.). Conway's All the World's Fighting Ships 1922–1946. Conway Maritime Press. pp. 318–346. ISBN 0-85177-146-7.
- Budzbon, Przemysław; Radziemski, Jan & Twardowski, Marek (2022). Warships of the Soviet Fleets 1939–1945. Vol. I: Major Combatants. Naval Institute Press. ISBN 978-1-68247-877-6.
- Polmar, Norman & Noot, Jurrien (1991). Submarines of the Russian and Soviet Navies, 1718–1990. Naval Institute Press. ISBN 0-87021-570-1.
- Rohwer, Jürgen (2005). Chronology of the War at Sea 1939–1945: The Naval History of World War Two (Third Revised ed.). Naval Institute Press. ISBN 1-59114-119-2.
- Yakubov, Vladimir; Worth, Richard (2008). Raising the Red Banner: A Pictorial History of Stalin's Fleet 1920–1945. Spellmount. ISBN 978-1-86227-450-1.
