= Grigory Shchedrin =

Grigoriy Ivanovich Shchedrin
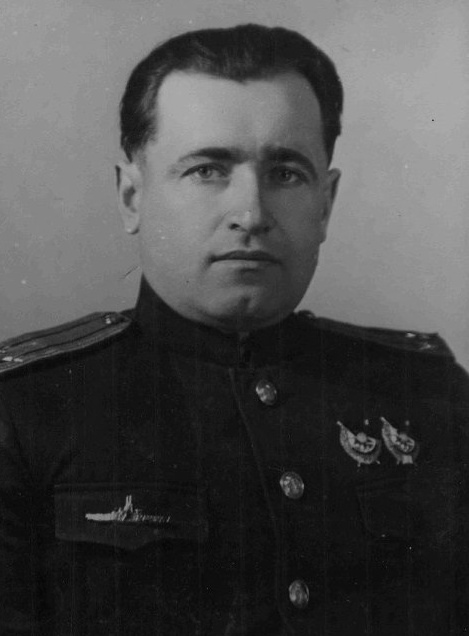
- Born: December 1, 1912; Tuapse, Russian Empire
- Died: January 7, 1995 (aged 82) Moscow
- Allegiance: Soviet Union
- Branch: Soviet Navy
- Service years: 1934-1973
- Rank: Vice Admiral
- Conflicts: World War II
- Awards: Hero of the Soviet Union; Order of Lenin; Order of the Red Banner (4); Order of Nakhimov; Order of the Patriotic War; Order of the Red Star; Order of the Red Banner of Labour

Grigoriy Ivanovich Shchedrin Russian: Григо́рий Ива́нович Щедри́н (1912–1995) was a Soviet Navy submarine commander and admiral. He was a Hero of the Soviet Union

Shchedrin was born in Tuapse and joined the merchant navy as a fourteen-year-old. He continued his education at a marine college and graduated as a navigator in 1932.

Shchedrin joined the navy's submarine service in 1934. He commanded boats M-5 and Shch-110 and won first prize in the Soviet Pacific Fleet in 1939 to 1941. In 1941 he was given command of the new Soviet S-class submarine S-56.

In 1942 Shchedrin led a flotilla of six submarines from the Pacific fleet to join the Red Banner Northern Fleet across the Pacific and Atlantic Oceans via the Panama Canal. This squadron reached Polyarnyy in March 1943. The S-56 carried out 8 war patrols sinking two transports and two warships. Shchedrin was awarded the Hero of the Soviet Union on 5 November 1944.

Shchedrin was chief of staff of the Baltic Fleet's 2nd submarine squadron from 1946–1950. In 1950-53 he was base commander at Świnoujście, Poland. In 1954 he graduated from the general staff academy with the gold medal and was promoted to vice admiral. He commanded the Kamchatka Flotilla of the Pacific Fleet until 1959 when he joined Navy staff. He was editor of the navy's magazine Morskoy Sbornik (Морской сборник) between 1969 and 1973.

Shchedrin retired in 1973 and died in Moscow in 1995.

== Honours and awards ==
- Hero of the Soviet Union
- Order of Lenin
- Order of the Red Banner, four times
- Order of Nakhimov, 2nd class
- Order of the Patriotic War, 1st class
- Order of the Red Banner of Labour
- Order of the Red Star
- Medal "For the Victory over Germany in the Great Patriotic War 1941–1945"
