= Soviet submarine S-2 =

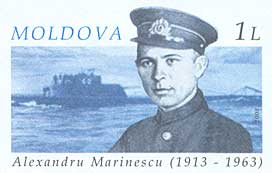
- S-2 (as seen at the hull) and famous commander of S-13 on a Moldovan stamp

History

Soviet Union
- Name: S-2
- Launched: 7 November 1935
- Commissioned: 23 September 1936
- Fate: Mined in Sea of Åland, 2 January 1940

General characteristics
- Class & type: S-class submarine (Series IX)
- Displacement: 840 t (830 long tons) surfaced; 1,070 t (1,050 long tons) submerged
- Length: 77.8 m (255 ft 3 in)
- Beam: 6.4 m (21 ft 0 in)
- Draft: 4 m (13 ft 1 in)
- Propulsion: 2 × diesel engines; 2 × electric motors; 2 × shafts
- Speed: 19.5 knots (36.1 km/h) surfaced; 9 knots (17 km/h) submerged
- Range: 9,500 nmi (17,600 km)
- Test depth: 80 m (260 ft)
- Complement: 46
- Armament: 6 × torpedo tubes; 2 × deck guns

S-2 was the second S-class submarine of the Soviet Navy. In early 1940, it entered Swedish territorial waters in the Sea of Åland where it hit a Swedish naval mine, and sank on January 2, 1940, with the loss of all 50 crew members.

== Design ==
The Srednyaya or S-class submarine (Russian: Средняя, lit. 'medium'), also called the Stalinets class (Russian: Сталинец, lit. 'follower of Stalin'), was an ocean-going diesel electric attack submarine. Its pressure hull had seven compartments, and the Series IX submarine's displacement was 840 tonnes (830 long tons) while on the surface and 1,070 tonnes (1,050 long tons) while submerged. It had a length of 77.8 m (255 ft 3 in), a beam of 6.4 metres (21 ft 0 in), and a draft of 4 metres (13 ft 1 in). It had two diesel engines to power it on the surface and two electric motors for when it was submerged, providing 4,000 shaft horsepower (3,000 kW) and 1,100 shaft horsepower (820 kW), respectively, to the two propeller shafts. This gave it a speed of 19.5 knots (36.1 km/h) on the surface and 9 knots (17 km/h) while underwater, and the submarine had a range of 9,500 nautical miles (17,600 km). Its test depth was 80 metres (260 ft), and as armament it had six 530 mm (21 in) torpedo tubes, one 100 mm (3.9 in) deck gun, and one 45 mm (1.8 in) gun.

S-2 was one of three Series IX boats, along with S-1 and S-3. The original design was made by German engineers at NV Ingenieurskantoor voor Scheepsbouw, the Dutch subsidiary of AG Weser, and later boats were modified by the Soviets to take into account the manufacturing capabilities available in the Soviet Union. After examining the German prototype submarine E-1 in 1932 and 1933, Soviet engineers decided to purchase its design for the Soviet Navy with some changes, increasing its size, range, and armament. E-1 became the basis for the first three S-class submarines, the Series IX boats, which were built in Leningrad using some German components.

== Wreck discovery ==
A search for the submarine wreck was begun in April 1999 by a team of divers from Sweden and Åland. According to the Military Archives of Sweden, the submarine hit the mine in Swedish territorial waters, but the Finnish archives specify the sinking occurred on Finnish territorial waters. The uncertainty of position necessitated a prolonged search. The diving team finally discovered the wreck inside Swedish territorial waters. One member of the diving team, Ingvald Eckerman, is a grandson of J. A. Eckerman who, as the lighthouse-keeper of the lighthouse at Märket, witnessed the submarine sinking in 1940.

The wreck was emptied of munitions during the summer of 2012.

== Bibliography ==
- Budzbon, Przemysław (1980). "Soviet Union". In Chesneau, Roger (ed.). Conway's All the World's Fighting Ships 1922–1946. Conway Maritime Press. pp. 318–346. ISBN 0-85177-146-7.
- Budzbon, Przemysław; Radziemski, Jan & Twardowski, Marek (2022). Warships of the Soviet Fleets 1939–1945. Vol. I: Major Combatants. Naval Institute Press. ISBN 978-1-68247-877-6.
- Polmar, Norman & Noot, Jurrien (1991). Submarines of the Russian and Soviet Navies, 1718–1990. Naval Institute Press. ISBN 0-87021-570-1.
- Rohwer, Jürgen (2005). Chronology of the War at Sea 1939–1945: The Naval History of World War Two (Third Revised ed.). Naval Institute Press. ISBN 1-59114-119-2.
- Yakubov, Vladimir & Worth, Richard (2008). Raising the Red Banner: A Pictorial History of Stalin's Fleet 1920–1945. Spellmount. ISBN 978-1-86227-450-1.
