= Soviet submarine S-1 =

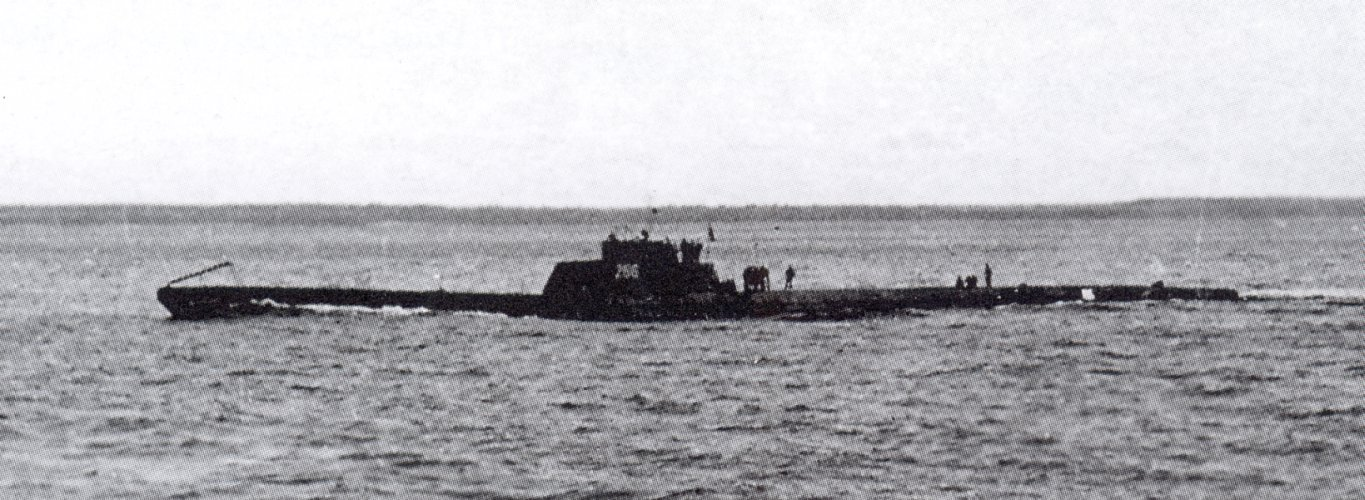
- S-1 during sea trials in 1936

History

Soviet Union
- Name: S-1, previously N-1
- Builder: Baltic Shipyard, Leningrad
- Yard number: 266
- Laid down: 25 December 1934
- Launched: 8 August 1935
- Commissioned: 11 September 1936
- Fate: Scuttled in Liepāja on 23 June 1941, raised by Germans and used for tests before being sunk on 7 August 1943.

General characteristics
- Class & type: S-class submarine (Series IX)
- Displacement: 840 t (830 long tons) surfaced; 1,070 t (1,050 long tons) submerged
- Length: 77.8 m (255 ft 3 in)
- Beam: 6.4 m (21 ft 0 in)
- Draft: 4 m (13 ft 1 in)
- Propulsion: 2 × diesel engines; 2 × electric motors; 2 × shafts
- Speed: 19.5 knots (36.1 km/h) surfaced; 9 knots (17 km/h) submerged
- Range: 9,500 nmi (17,600 km)
- Test depth: 80 m (260 ft)
- Complement: 46
- Armament: 6 × torpedo tubes; 2 × deck guns

Service record
- Part of: Baltic Fleet 1st Submarine Brigade
- Commanders: D. M. Kosmin; 11 September 1936 – 4 July 1937; A. E. Oryol; 4 July 1937 – 9 February 1938; A. V. Tripolsky; 23 March 1938 – 28 February 1940; I. T. Morskoi; 28 February 1940 – 23 June 1941
- Operations: 1st war patrol: 3–12 December 1939; 2nd war patrol: 22 December 1939 – 20 January 1940; Blockade of Riga: 9–22 June 1940
- Victories: 1 merchant ship sunk (3,324 GRT)

S-1 (Russian: С-1) was the lead ship of the S-class submarines of the Soviet Navy. It participated in the Winter War and the Soviet annexation of the Baltic states in 1940 before undergoing repairs and being scuttled by its crew in a shipyard at the start of Operation Barbarossa.

S-1 was among the first three S-class submarines that were built on the basis of the German-designed submarine E-1, the blueprints of which was sold to the Soviets in 1933. Soviet engineers, working together with the German designers, examined E-1 and made modifications to its design based on their requirements. S-1 was built in Leningrad and included German components.

The submarine carried out two patrols during the Winter War against Finland and was credited with sinking one transport, for a total of 3,324 gross register tons (GRT), and possibly shot down one Finnish aircraft. On its way back from its second patrol, S-1 was attacked by aircraft and also sustained damage to its hull while having to maneuver through ice in the Baltic Sea. For their actions, the entire crew was awarded the Order of the Red Banner and the captain of S-1 at the time, Alexander Tripolsky, became a Hero of the Soviet Union. It later took part in the naval blockade of Riga when the Soviet Union occupied the Baltic states.

S-1 was undergoing repairs at a shipyard in Liepāja at the start of the Soviet–German War and was scuttled by its crew. The Germans later raised the submarine, since it was still intact, and used it for weapons testing by the Kriegsmarine before it was destroyed in August 1943.

== Design ==
The Srednyaya or S-class submarine (Russian: Средняя, lit. 'medium'), also called the Stalinets class (Russian: Сталинец, lit. 'follower of Stalin'), was an ocean-going diesel electric attack submarine. Its pressure hull had seven compartments, and the Series IX submarine's displacement was 840 tonnes (830 long tons) while on the surface and 1,070 tonnes (1,050 long tons) while submerged. It had a length of 77.8 m (255 ft 3 in), a beam of 6.4 metres (21 ft 0 in), and a draft of 4 metres (13 ft 1 in). It had two diesel engines to power it on the surface and two electric motors for when it was submerged, providing 4,000 shaft horsepower (3,000 kW) and 1,100 shaft horsepower (820 kW), respectively, to the two propeller shafts. This gave it a speed of 19.5 knots (36.1 km/h) on the surface and 9 knots (17 km/h) while underwater, and the submarine had a range of 9,500 nautical miles (17,600 km). Its test depth was 80 metres (260 ft), and as armament it had six 530 mm (21 in) torpedo tubes, one 100 mm (3.9 in) deck gun, and one 45 mm (1.8 in) gun.

S-1 was one of three Series IX boats, along with S-2 and S-3. The original design was made by German engineers at NV Ingenieurskantoor voor Scheepsbouw, the Dutch subsidiary of AG Weser, and later boats were modified by the Soviets to take into account the manufacturing capabilities available in the Soviet Union. After examining the German prototype submarine E-1 in 1932 and 1933, Soviet engineers decided to purchase its design for the Soviet Navy with some changes, increasing its size, range, and armament. E-1 became the basis for the first three S-class submarines, the Series IX boats, which were built in Leningrad using some German components.

== Commissioning ==
S-1 was originally called N-1 (yard number 266) and was laid down on 25 December 1934 in Leningrad. The boat was launched on 8 August 1935 and carried out its first voyage to Krondstadt in December 1935. There was a proposal to name the boat Voroshilovets (Russian: Ворошиловец, lit. 'follower of Voroshilov'), though it was not accepted. The submarine was commissioned on 11 September 1936, with Captain 3rd rank Dmitry M. Kosmin in command. On 23 September N-1 was assigned to the 13th Submarine Squadron of the 1st Submarine Brigade in the Red Banner Baltic Fleet. N-1 was renamed S-1 on 20 October 1937.

== Service history ==
=== Winter War ===
When the Winter War started with Finland in November 1939, S-1 was stationed in Tallinn with the 13th Submarine Squadron, and was commanded by Captain-lieutenant Alexander Tripolsky. On the first day of the war S-1 was located at the entrance to the Gulf of Finland. When the submarine received the signal "Torch" that signified the start of a war with Finland, it was not understood by its commander because he did not have the document explaining the meaning of signals. On 2 December 1939 S-1 was called back to its base in Tallinn. On the evening of the 3rd, it departed on its first war patrol, in the waters near Rauma on the Gulf of Bothnia. This patrol was mostly uneventful except for the sinking of one transport on 10 December 1939, the German steamer Bolheim. S-1 fired torpedoes at the transport, but they missed, so the submarine surfaced and used its deck gun to sink the vessel. S-1 returned to Tallinn on 12 December.

S-1 left on its second patrol on 22 December 1939 to a position north of the Åland Islands. It ran aground near the island of Märket on the 24th, in the strait of South Kvarken, and was almost rammed by either a Swedish or Finnish vessel. But the submarine managed to move at the last moment and get away. During the patrol S-1 only encountered one convoy and was not able to catch up to them. It began returning to Tallinn on 16 January 1940. On its way back the boat had to maneuver in between pieces of ice and sometimes below the ice. At one point, S-1 was attacked by two Finnish aircraft, and according to the crew they shot down one of them using one of their deck guns. S-1 reached ice-free water on 19 January and returned to Tallinn on the following day. The submarine sustained significant damage from the ice, including to its hull. For this patrol the entire crew of S-1 was awarded the Order of the Red Banner on 7 February 1940 and Captain-lieutenant Tripolsky became a Hero of the Soviet Union. He was made the commander of the 13th Submarine Squadron later that month, and Captain 3rd rank Ivan T. Morskoi was made the new commanding officer of S-1.

=== World War II ===
In the next few months S-1 was involved in training exercises, before participating in the blockade of Riga in June 1940 when the Soviet Union annexed Latvia and the Baltic states. Afterwards S-1 underwent repairs in Libava (Liepāja), and was reassigned to the 1st Submarine Squadron of the Baltic Fleet. S-1 was in the shipyard being repaired when Operation Barbarossa began on 22 June 1941, and on the 23rd the submarine was scuttled by its crew to prevent its capture by the Germans. The crew then left the city on another submarine, S-3. The Soviet Navy struck S-1 from the naval list on 27 July 1941.

But S-1 was still mostly intact despite being scuttled. It was raised by the Germans and taken to Kiel to be used for weapons testing by the Kriegsmarine, though sources indicate that it was never commissioned into their fleet. S-1 was sunk during one of these tests on 7 August 1943.

=== Summary ===
Ships sunk by S-1
Date	Ship	Flag	Tonnage	Notes
10 December 1939	Bolheim	(Nazi Germany)	3,324 GRT	Deck gun
Total:			3,324 GRT	

== Bibliography ==
- Budzbon, Przemysław (1980). "Soviet Union". In Chesneau, Roger (ed.). Conway's All the World's Fighting Ships 1922–1946. Conway Maritime Press. pp. 318–346. ISBN 0-85177-146-7.
- Budzbon, Przemysław; Radziemski, Jan & Twardowski, Marek (2022). Warships of the Soviet Fleets 1939–1945. Vol. I: Major Combatants. Naval Institute Press. ISBN 978-1-68247-877-6.
- Polmar, Norman & Noot, Jurrien (1991). Submarines of the Russian and Soviet Navies, 1718–1990. Naval Institute Press. ISBN 0-87021-570-1.
- Rohwer, Jürgen (2005). Chronology of the War at Sea 1939–1945: The Naval History of World War Two (Third Revised ed.). Naval Institute Press. ISBN 1-59114-119-2.
- Yakubov, Vladimir & Worth, Richard (2008). Raising the Red Banner: A Pictorial History of Stalin's Fleet. Spellmount. ISBN 978-1-86227-450-1.
