= Soviet submarine S-3 =

- S-class submarine

History

Soviet Union
- Name: S-3, previously N-3
- Builder: Baltic Shipyard, Leningrad
- Yard number: 268
- Laid down: 25 April 1934
- Launched: 30 April 1936
- Commissioned: 13 July 1938
- Stricken: 27 July 1941
- Fate: Sunk on 24 June 1941 near the Latvian coast

General characteristics
- Class & type: S-class submarine (Series IX)
- Displacement: 840 t (830 long tons) surfaced; 1,070 t (1,050 long tons) submerged
- Length: 77.8 m (255 ft 3 in)
- Beam: 6.4 m (21 ft 0 in)
- Draft: 4 m (13 ft 1 in)
- Propulsion: 2 × diesel engines; 2 × electric motors; 2 × shafts
- Speed: 19.5 knots (36.1 km/h) surfaced; 9 knots (17 km/h) submerged
- Range: 9,500 nmi (17,600 km)
- Test depth: 80 m (260 ft)
- Complement: 46
- Armament: 6 × torpedo tubes; 2 × deck guns

Service record
- Part of: Baltic Fleet 1st Submarine Brigade
- Commanders: K. I. Malofeyev; 23 March 1938 – 10 February 1939; V. F. Kulbakin; 10 February 1939 – 4 March 1939; K. I. Malofeyev; 4 March 1939 – 9 May 1941; N. A. Kostromichev; 9 May – 24 June 1941
- Operations: First war patrol: 29 November – 8 December 1939; Second war patrol: 13–22 December 1939; Blockade of Riga: 9–22 June 1940; Escape from Liepāja: 23–24 June 1941
- Victories: None

S-3 was the third boat of the S-class submarines of the Soviet Navy. The submarine took part in the Winter War and the Soviet annexation of the Baltic states before being sunk in the first days of Operation Barbarossa.

S-3 was among the first three S-class submarines that were built on the basis of the German-designed submarine E-1, the blueprints of which were sold to the Soviets in 1933. Soviet engineers, working together with the German designers, examined E-1 and made modifications to its design based on their requirements. S-3 was built in Leningrad and included German components. The submarine carried out two patrols in the Baltic Sea during the Winter War with Finland without sinking any ships, and was part of the naval blockade of Riga when the Soviet Union annexed Latvia in 1940. When Operation Barbarossa began in June 1941, S-3 left the port of Liepāja in Soviet Latvia as the German Army reached the city. But it was attacked by German fast boats along the way and was eventually sunk by a depth charge, on 24 June 1941. Some survivors were picked out of the water and taken prisoner by the Germans.

== Design ==
The Srednyaya or S-class submarine (Russian: Средняя, lit. 'medium'), also called the Stalinets class (Russian: Сталинец, lit. 'follower of Stalin'), was an ocean-going diesel electric attack submarine. Its pressure hull had seven compartments, and the Series IX submarine's displacement was 840 tonnes (830 long tons) while on the surface and 1,070 tonnes (1,050 long tons) while submerged. It had a length of 77.8 m (255 ft 3 in), a beam of 6.4 metres (21 ft 0 in), and a draft of 4 metres (13 ft 1 in). It had two diesel engines to power it on the surface and two electric motors for when it was submerged, providing 4,000 shaft horsepower (3,000 kW) and 1,100 shaft horsepower (820 kW), respectively, to the two propeller shafts. This gave it a speed of 19.5 knots (36.1 km/h) on the surface and 9 knots (17 km/h) while underwater, and the submarine had a range of 9,500 nautical miles (17,600 km). Its test depth was 80 metres (260 ft), and as armament it had six 530 mm (21 in) torpedo tubes, one 100 mm (3.9 in) deck gun, and one 45 mm (1.8 in) gun.

S-3 was one of three Series IX boats, along with S-1 and S-2. The original design was made by German engineers at NV Ingenieurskantoor voor Scheepsbouw, the Dutch subsidiary of AG Weser, and later boats were modified by the Soviets to take into account the manufacturing capabilities available in the Soviet Union. After examining the German prototype submarine E-1 in 1932 and 1933, Soviet engineers decided to purchase its design for the Soviet Navy with some changes, increasing its size, range, and armament. E-1 became the basis for the first three S-class submarines, the Series IX boats, which were built in Leningrad using some German components.

== Commissioning ==
S-3 was originally called N-3 (yard number 268) and was laid down on 25 April 1935 in Leningrad. The submarine was launched on 30 April 1936 and there was a proposal to name the boat Kalininets (Russian: Калининец, lit. 'follower of Kalinin'), though it was not accepted. But on 20 October 1937 its designation was changed to S-3. The submarine was commissioned on 13 July 1938 and assigned to the Red Banner Baltic Fleet, with Captain-lieutenant Kuzma I. Malofeyev in command. S-3 became part of the 13th Submarine Squadron of the Baltic Fleet's 1st Submarine Brigade.

== Service history ==
=== First patrol ===
On 29 November 1939 S-3 left on its first war patrol, still commanded by Captain-lieutenant Malofeyev, and on the next day it received a signal that announced the start of the war with Finland. The submarine took a position at the south entrance of the Kalmar Strait and monitored the area for German transports. S-3 noticed several but they were in Swedish waters, which it was ordered not to enter. A large wave hit the submarine and caused some damage on 8 December 1939, and it returned to base later that day.

=== Second patrol ===
S-3 began its second patrol on 13 December, taking a position to the southwest of the Aland Islands. Near the start of the patrol the submarine encountered a transport convoy, but all of them were German and so the commander decided to let them go. On 17 December, the German merchant ship Gilhausen was found by S-3 in the waters that were being blockaded and was stopped to be inspected, then was let go. Later that day the submarine also tried to stop the ship Pinnau, but when it fired on the transport none of the shells met their target, and eventually a warship showed up in the area, causing S-3 to dive and leave the area. After observing several more transports and other enemy activity, S-3 returned to its base on 22 December 1939.

=== World War II ===
For the rest of December 1939 until early January 1940 the submarine underwent repairs. It spent most of the first half of 1940 in training exercises. When the Soviet Union annexed the Baltic states in June 1940, S-3 was part of the naval blockade of Riga from 9 to 22 June.

On 9 May 1941, Captain-lieutenant Nikolai A. Kostromichev became the commanding officer of S-3, replacing Malofeyev. When Operation Barbarossa began on 22 June 1941, the boat was being repaired in the shipyard at Libava (Liepāja), though it was capable of traveling on the surface. In defiance of orders to scuttle the submarine, Kostromichev took S-3 and tried to escape from the city as the German Army approached, along with the crew of the submarine S-1 (which had been scuttled at the shipyard) and some yard workers. In total there were about 100 people on S-3 when it departed from Libava on 23 June 1941. The submarine traveled towards Riga along the Latvian coast at a speed of five knots. On 24 June, it was intercepted by the German fast attack craft S-35 and S-60 of the 3rd S-boat Flotilla. In a fight between them that lasted over an hour, the submarine and the S-boats fired at each other with their deck guns, before the boat S-60 dropped a depth charge near S-3 that caused it to sink. At least nine survivors (sources differ on the exact number) from S-3 were picked up from the water by German ships and became prisoners of war. The body of the captain of S-3 washed up on the shore of the Estonian island of Saaremaa, where it was buried.

S-3 was struck from the Soviet Navy list on 27 July 1941.

== Bibliography ==
- Budzbon, Przemysław (1980). "Soviet Union". In Chesneau, Roger (ed.). Conway's All the World's Fighting Ships 1922–1946. Conway Maritime Press. pp. 318–346. ISBN 0-85177-146-7.
- Budzbon, Przemysław; Radziemski, Jan & Twardowski, Marek (2022). Warships of the Soviet Fleets 1939–1945. Vol. I: Major Combatants. Naval Institute Press. ISBN 978-1-68247-877-6.
- Polmar, Norman & Noot, Jurrien (1991). Submarines of the Russian and Soviet Navies, 1718–1990. Naval Institute Press. ISBN 0-87021-570-1.
- Rohwer, Jürgen (2005). Chronology of the War at Sea 1939–1945: The Naval History of World War Two (Third Revised ed.). Naval Institute Press. ISBN 1-59114-119-2.
- Yakubov, Vladimir; Worth, Richard (2008). Raising the Red Banner: A Pictorial History of Stalin's Fleet 1920–1945. Chalford, Stroud: Spellmount. ISBN 978-1-86227-450-1.
