= Vladimir Sidorov =

Soviet naval officer

Vladimir Vasilyevich Sidorov
- Born: 11 June 1924; Kiev, Ukrainian SSR, Soviet Union
- Died: 2 January 2000 (aged 75) Moscow, Russia
- Buried: Troyekurovskoye Cemetery
- Allegiance: Soviet Union
- Branch: Soviet Navy
- Service years: 1942-1991
- Rank: Admiral
- Commands: Kamchatka Flotilla; Baltic Fleet; Pacific Fleet
- Conflicts: Soviet–Japanese War
- Awards: Order of the October Revolution; Order of the Patriotic War First Class; Order of the Red Banner of Labour; Order of the Red Star (twice); Order "For Service to the Homeland in the Armed Forces of the USSR" Third Class; Medal "For Battle Merit"

Vladimir Vasilyevich Sidorov (Russian: Владимир Васильевич Сидоров; 11 June 1924 – 2 January 2000) was an officer of the Soviet Navy. He reached the rank of admiral, and served as commander of the Kamchatka Flotilla between 1971 and 1972, the Baltic Fleet between 1978 and 1981, and the Pacific Fleet from 1981 until 1986.

== Biography ==
Sidorov was born on 11 June 1924 in Kiev, in what was then the Ukrainian Soviet Socialist Republic, in the Soviet Union. He enrolled as a cadet in the Pacific Higher Naval School in 1942, seeing action in the Soviet–Japanese War in 1945, and graduating in 1946. On graduating he was assigned to the Baltic Fleet, where he served as assistant commander of the minesweeper TShch-478, and from 1949 as commander of the minesweeper TShch-457. In June 1950, he was appointed a senior officer of the staff of the 105th Defence Brigade, and then from May 1951, commander of the 35th Detachment of the brigade's 10th Minesweeper Division. In November 1951, he became assistant commander of the minelayer Marti, holding the position until December 1953, when he enrolled in the Higher Special Officer Classes.

On graduating from the courses in 1954, Sidorov was appointed executive officer of the Kotlin-class destroyer Skrytny, and then from December 1957, as commander of her sister ship Svetly. In 1962, he became chief of staff of the 35th Destroyer Brigade, completing the Naval Academy's course by correspondence in 1963, and being then appointed commander of the Baltic Fleet's 64th Defence Brigade. Sidorov was transferred to the Northern Fleet in 1967, commanding its 23rd Anti-Submarine Division, and being promoted to rear-admiral on 19 February 1968. He was again transferred to a new fleet in 1971, taking command of the Pacific Fleet's Kamchatka Flotilla, with a promotion to vice-admiral on 6 May 1972. He was appointed chief of staff of the Pacific Fleet in December 1972, but returned to the Baltic Fleet as its first deputy commander on 25 July 1975, holding this post until 7 June 1978, when he was appointed commander of the fleet. He was promoted to admiral on 21 April 1979.

On 7 February 1981, most of the Pacific Fleet's senior officers, including its commander, Admiral Emil Spiridonov, were killed in a plane crash. Sidorov was appointed the new fleet commander on 12 February 1981. He held the post for the next five years, overseeing the introduction of new ships and technologies to the fleet, and the conducting of voyages into the Pacific and Indian Oceans. The roles and capabilities of naval aviation and naval infantry were also developed. In 1983 he was in charge of Soviet salvage operations after the shootdown of Korean Air Lines Flight 007 into the Pacific. In December 1986, he was appointed Deputy Commander-in-Chief of the Navy for Logistics, and Chief of Naval Logistics. He held this position until his retirement on 20 March 1991.

Sidorov had been a member of the Communist Party of the Soviet Union since 1949. He was a candidate member of the Central Committee of the Communist Party of the Soviet Union between 1981 and 1991, and a deputy of the Supreme Soviet of the Soviet Union for its tenth and eleventh convocations. Following the dissolution of the Soviet Union in 1991, Sidorov was part of efforts to encourage arms exports to boost the Russian economy. In June 1992 he visited Taiwan with Rear-Admiral Anatoly Shtyrov and representatives from Russian defence industries, meeting with the Taiwanese premier and top military officials, including the Minister of National Defence, and the Chief of the General Staff.

Sidorov died in Moscow on 2 January 2000, and was buried in the city's Troyekurovskoye Cemetery.

== Honours and awards ==
Over his career Sidorov received the Order of the October Revolution, the Order of the Red Banner of Labour, the Order of the Patriotic War first class, two Orders of the Red Star, and the Order "For Service to the Homeland in the Armed Forces of the USSR" third class, as well as various medals.
