= Kamchatka Flotilla =

- Камчатская флотилия Kamchatskaya flotiliya
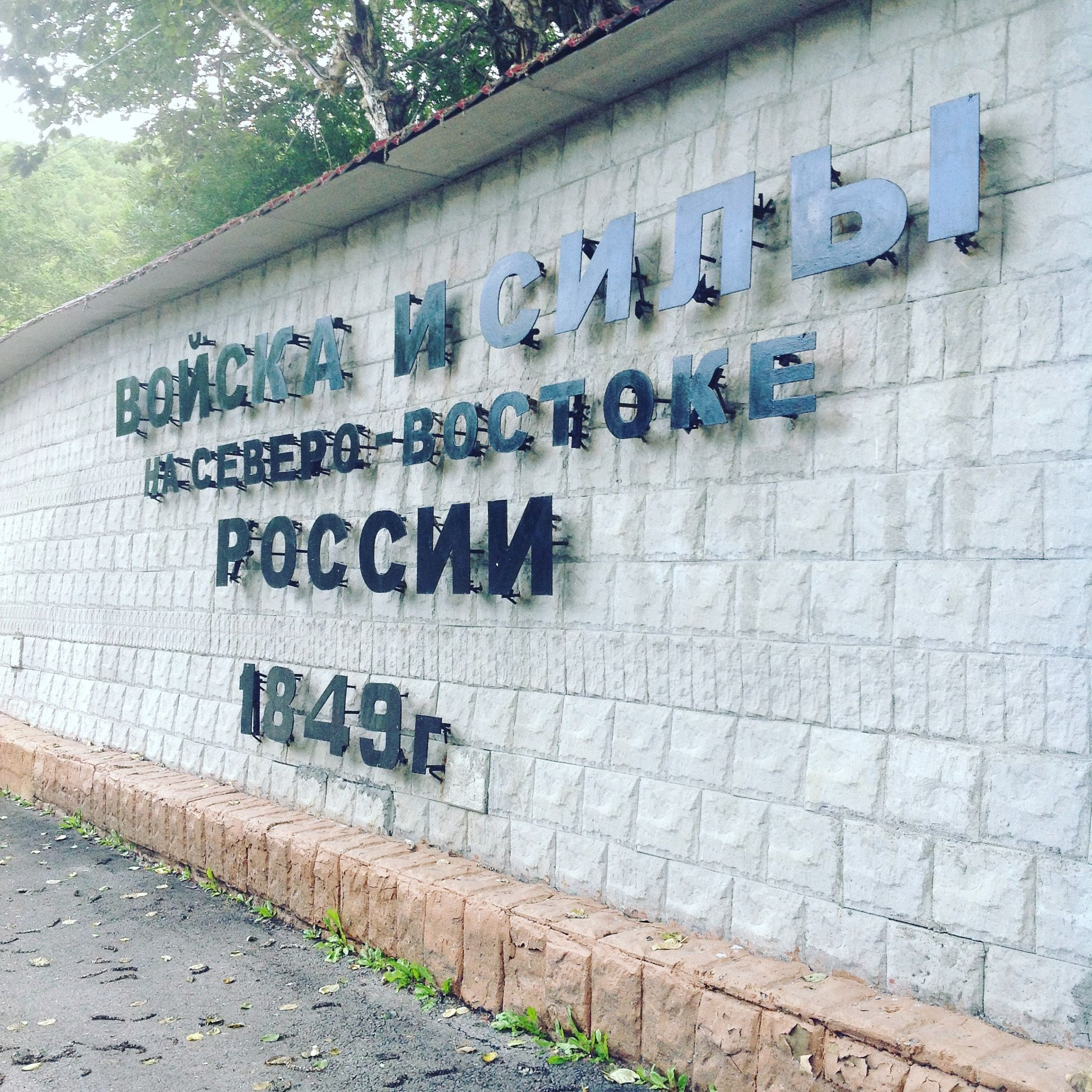
- Troops and Forces of the North-East headquarters sign, Petropavlovsk-Kamchatskiy, 2007
- Active: 1945–present
- Country: Soviet Union; Russia
- Branch: Soviet Navy; Russian Navy
- Garrison/HQ: Petropavlovsk-Kamchatsky
- Battle honours: Order of the Red Banner

Commanders
- Current commander: Vice-Admiral Aleksandr Yuldashev
- Notable commanders: Grigori Shchedrin

The Kamchatka Military Flotilla (Russian: Камчатская флотилия, romanized: Kamchatskaya flotiliya) is a flotilla of the Russian Navy. On December 14, 1849, in accordance with the Decree of Emperor Nicholas I, the Okhotsk military flotilla was transferred to Petropavlovsk-Kamchatsky in Kamchatka. Thus December 14 became marked as the celebratory "Day" of the flotilla/NEGTF.

The Kamchatka Military Flotilla was formed on December 1, 1945 by order of the People's Commissar of the Navy.

The Kamchatka Flotilla of diverse forces was reorganized during the 1960s; on 15 October 1979 the Kamchatka Flotilla was formed (or reformed). In March 1998 the Northeastern Group of Troops and Forces was created from the Kamchatka Flotilla. It was based on the Kamchatka Peninsula and had responsibility for a coastal zone of the Pacific Ocean. On April 30, 1975, the flotilla was awarded the Order of the Red Banner.

The Kamchatka Flotilla's forces in 1988 included the 173rd Anti-Submarine Warfare Brigade (Ilicheva Bay, Petropavlovsk-Kamchatka); 114th Coastal Defence Brigade; 182nd Submarine Brigade (Krasheninnikova Bay, Kamchatka Oblast); and the 104th independent Hydrographic Ship Battalion at Petropavlovsk-Kamchatka.

Until 1 June 2002, the 22nd Motor Rifle Division of the Far East Military District was located on the peninsula. It then became the 40th independent Motorised Rifle Brigade. In September 2007 it became the 40th Independent (twice Red Banner) Krasnodar-Harbin twice Red Banner Naval Infantry Brigade. This situation lasted until March, 2009 when it became the 3rd Naval Infantry Regiment, and later the 40th Naval Infantry Brigade.

== Order of battle ==
It includes:

Ships and Vessels

- 114th Coastal Defence Brigade (Petropavlovsk-Kamchatsky);
- 117th Coastal Defence Division (Petropavlovsk-Kamchatsky);
- 66th Separate Missile Ship Division (Acha Bay);
- 10th Submarine Division (Vilyuchinsk);
- 25th Submarine Division (Tarja Bay);
- 32nd Auxiliary Unit (Zavoiko Peninsula);

Naval Infantry and Coastal Defence

40th Separate Naval Infantry Brigade (Petropavlovsk-Kamchatsky);

Coastal Defense units

520th Separate Missile Brigade (Sakhalin and The Kuril Islands);

- Eight surface-to-surface missile divizions (battalions), three on Sakhalin, two on Iturup Island, and three elsewhere

Aviation and Air Defence units

- 865th Separate Fighter Regiment (Elizovo Airport, transferred to Troops and Forces of the North-East (OKVS) July 1, 1998);
- 317th Separate Aviation Regiment (Elizovo, status needs to be confirmed)
- 175th Helicopter Anti-ship Squadron (Elizovo, status needs to be confirmed);
- 216th Electronic Warfare Regiment (Ozyorny);
- 1532nd Air Defence Regiment (Petropavlovsk-Kamchatsky)

== Command ==
=== Commanders of the Flotilla ===
- 1945-1946 - Rear Admiral I. I. Baykov
- 1946-1948 - Rear Admiral N. I. Vinogradov
- 1951-1954 - Rear Admiral L. N. Panteleyev
- 1954-1959 - Rear Admiral G. I. Shchedrin
- 1966-1971 - Rear Admiral B. E. Yamkovoi
- 1971-1973 - Rear Admiral V. V. Sidorov
- 1973-1978 - Rear Admiral I. M. Kapitanets
- 1978-1980 - Vice-Admiral N. G. Klitniy
- 1980-1983 - Vice Admiral G. A. Khvatov
- 1983-1986 - Vice-Admiral D. M. Komarov
- 1986-1989 - Vice Admiral G. N. Gurinov
- 1989-1993 - Vice-Admiral Y. I. Shumarin
- 1993-1995 - Vice-Admiral V. T. Kharnikov
- 1995-1998 - Vice-Admiral V. F. Dorogin

=== Commander of the Northeastern Group of Troops and Forces ===
- 1998-2000 - Vice-Admiral V. F. Dorogin
- 2000-2001 - Vice-Admiral K. S. Sidenko
- 2002-2006 - Vice-Admiral V. F. Gavrikov
- 2006-2009 - Rear Admiral A. V. Vitko
- 2009-2012 - Rear Admiral K. G. Maklov
- 2012-2014 - Rear Admiral V. N. Liina
- 2014-2018 - Rear Admiral S. V. Lipilin
- Since 2018 - Vice Admiral A. Yu. Yuldashev

=== Chiefs of Staff of the Flotilla ===
- 1948-1949 - Captain 1st Rank S.А. Kanapadze
- 1951-1957 - Rear Admiral M.G. Tomsk
- 1957-1963 - Rear Admiral A.B. Teishersky
- 1963-1968 - Rear Admiral Yu.S. Russin
- 1972-1976 - Rear Admiral N.G. Klitny
- 1984-1986 - Rear Admiral G.N. Gurinov
- 1986-1989 - Rear Admiral Yu.I. Shumanin
- 1989-1994 - Rear Admiral M.G. Kulak
- 1994-1995 - Rear Admiral V.F. Dorogin
- 1995-1998 - Rear Admiral M.L. Abramov

=== First Deputy Flotilla Commander ===
- 1976-1979 - Rear Admiral A.I. Skvortsov
- 1979-1982 - Rear Admiral N.G. Logky
- 1987-1991 - Rear Admiral N.D. Zakorin
- 1991-1994 - Rear Admiral V.F. Dorogin
- 1994-1998 - Rear Admiral M.G. Kulak

== Notes ==
=== Works cited ===
- Holm, Michael (n.d.). "Red Banner Pacific Fleet". www.ww2.dk.
