= El Liberal (Bilbao) =

Former Spanish newspaper

El Liberal was a Spanish liberal newspaper published in Bilbao between 1901 and 1937. Originally a local edition of the Madrid-based El Liberal, it was later bought up by its editor, Indalecio Prieto. In 1913 the circulation of the paper was 17,000 copies. The paper was sold to the Basque industrialist Horacio Echevarrieta in 1916.
