= El Liberal =

Spanish newspaper

El Liberal was a Spanish liberal newspaper published in Madrid between 1879 and 1936. It was one of the leading papers of Spain under the Restoration.

Between 1890 and 1906, El Liberal was edited by Miguel Moya (1856–1920), a leading Spanish journalist who would go on to preside the holding company and to found the Asociación de la Prensa de Madrid, which he would also preside from 1895 to 1920.

In 1901, its holding group, Sociedad Editorial de España, also known as "Grupo El Liberal" or the "Trust", decided to publish specific editions for Barcelona, Sevilla y Bilbao. The Bilbao edition, particularly, would become especially prominent as a Republican paper, and would shortly afterwards be bought up by its editor, Indalecio Prieto, who would go on to become a leading figure in Spanish politics, both as minister in successive governments of the Second Spanish Republic and as president of Spain's Socialist party (PSOE), from 1935 to 1948.

In 1913, El Liberal was the fourth best-selling newspaper in Madrid with a circulation of 115,000 copies. The same year its Bilbao edition had a circulation of 17,000 copies.

== See also ==
- La Libertad (Spain)
