= 1947 Cádiz explosion =

1947 explosion in Cádiz, Spain

Coordinates: 36.5239°N 6.2828°W

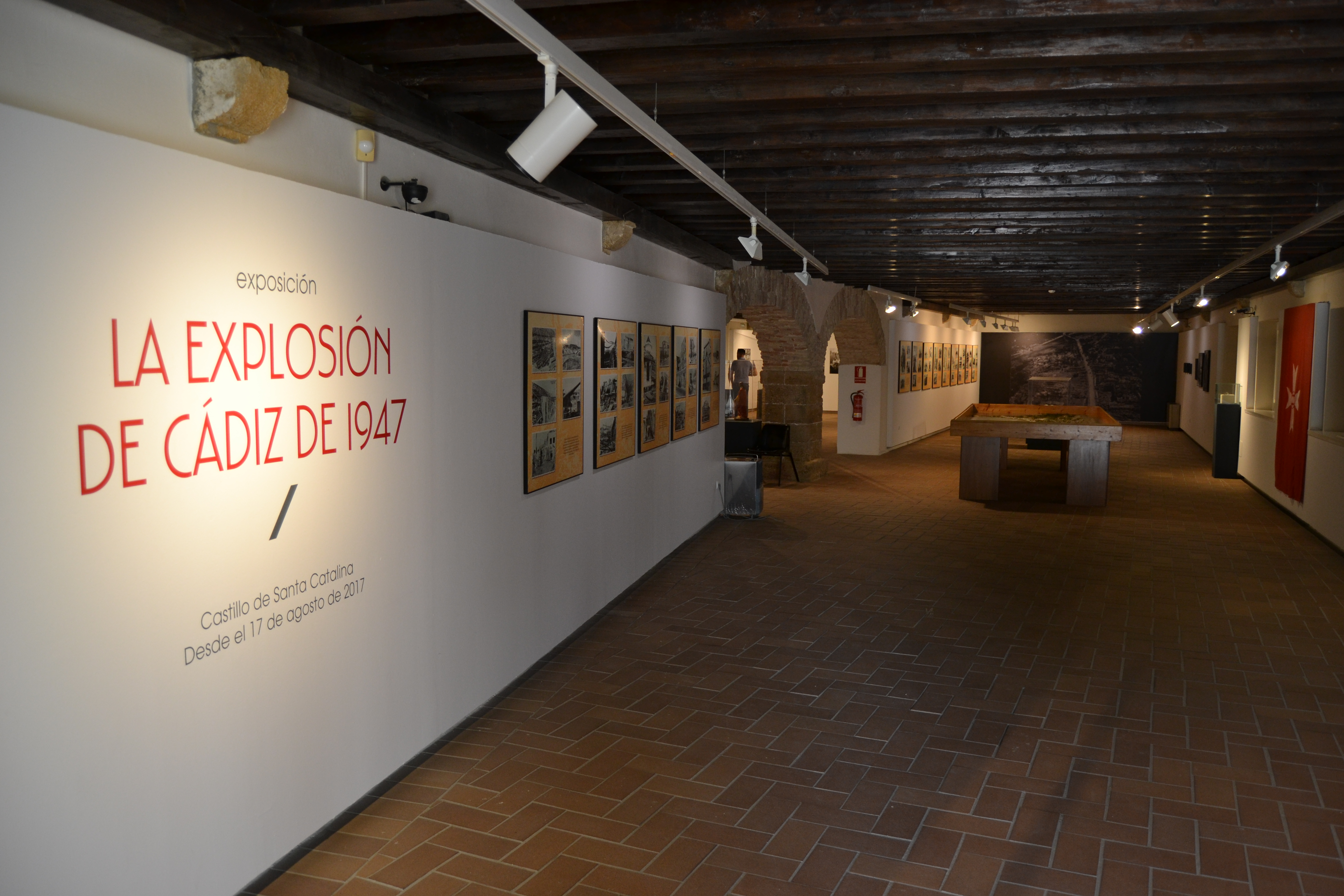
Exhibition about the explosion in Cádiz, 2017

The Cádiz explosion was a military accident which occurred at 9:45 pm, on 18 August 1947 at a storage depot in the Base de Defensas Submarinas (Submarine Defence Base) in Cádiz, Spain, when some 1,737 sea mines, torpedoes and depth charges (of a total of 2,228 distributed in two depots), containing 200 tonnes of TNT and amatol, exploded for unknown reasons.

Official figures given at the time were 150 dead, a figure that has since been reduced to 147, and 5,000 injured, but other sources refer to much higher figures given the extension of the explosion and the populated districts and types of buildings destroyed.

As well as the actual military facilities destroyed, the populated districts of San Severiano and San José were seriously damaged. Among the buildings totally wrecked there were the Asilo de Ancianos (old age peoples' home), the Casa Cuna orphanage (41 deaths), a nearby factory (100 workers killed), the Madre De Dios Hospital (no figures given). The Echevarrieta shipyard, right next to the storage depot, and which employed 2,500 workers, only lost 27 men because there were fewer workers on the nightshift. This shipyard had signed a lucrative contract in the mid-1920s to supply the German Navy with German-designed torpedoes and had also built a U-Boat for testing and training.

The explosion also destroyed the Punic or Phoenician necropolis, whose excavation works had featured in National Geographic in 1924.

== Different versions ==
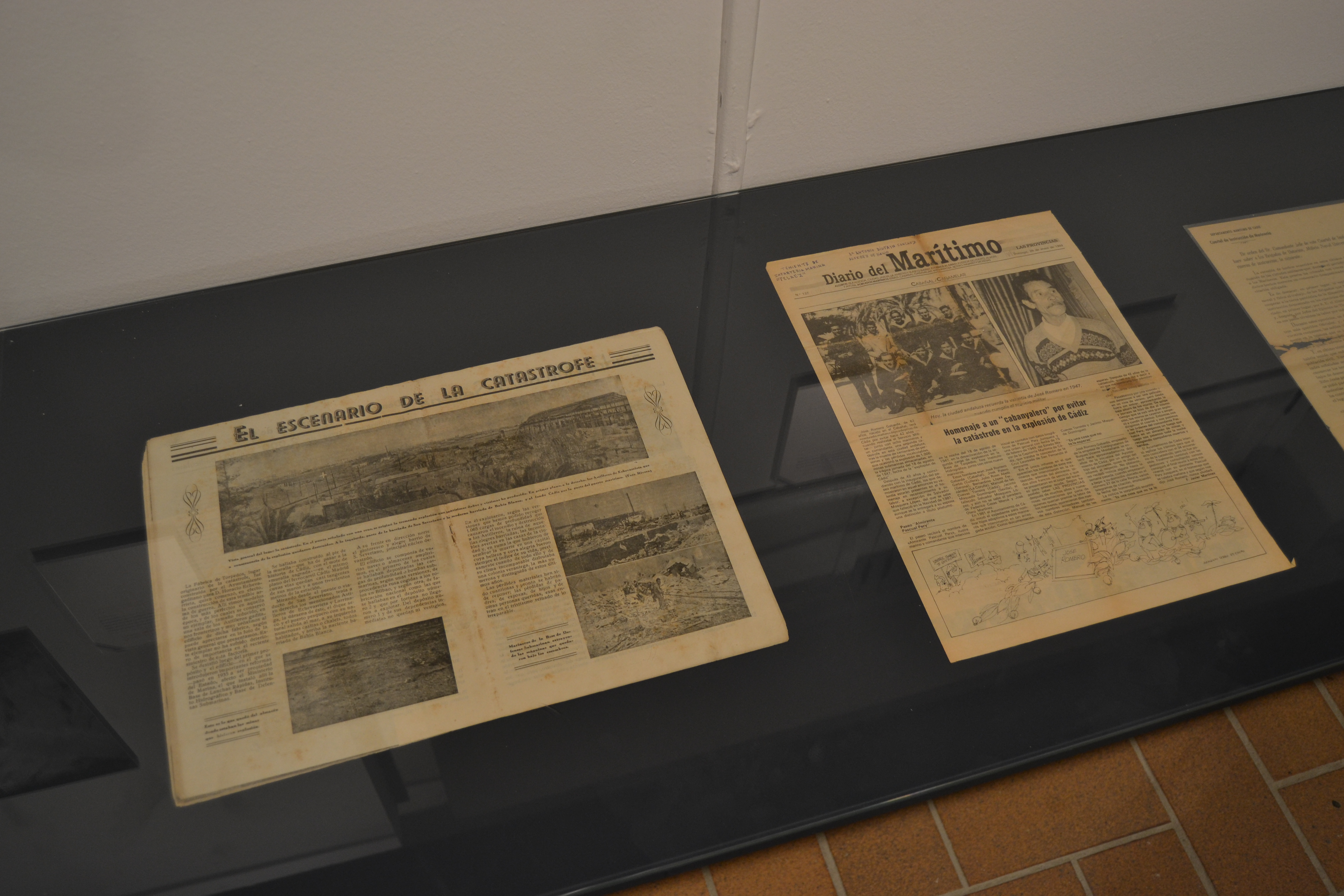
Newspapers of the following days

No official technical explanation was made public. The findings of the secret military inquest were never published and all the relevant documentation was later destroyed in a fire at the naval archive centre. There was much talk of sabotage, and this theory was supported by several factors, including the increased activity of the Spanish Maquis around this time, that several witnesses had seen a small boat leaving the site in the dark, and that the Spanish secret service had received information that something was about to happen in Cádiz, together with the fact that Franco did not visit the city until several months after the explosion.

On 26 August, the front page of La Vanguardia carried a statement from Radio Nacional de España officially accusing the BBC of an "ongoing campaign of defamation against the Régimen and the Spanish nation". The press release ended with, “One has only to contrast this deceitful behaviour of the BBC, and its hatred of Spain and its Régimen, a falsehood which we have had occasion to demonstrate as such, with the clean and moral history of Spanish radio which has never yet been shown to have erred or been mistaken in any of its news items.”

The press release stated that the "mines that caused the explosion were from the 'Reds' and Russian-made, and that they were less stable than Spanish mines precisely for that reason".

More recent investigations have revealed that the munitions had been brought to Cádiz in 1943 as part of Franco's strategy to mine the Spanish coast from Huelva to Málaga with 16,000 mines to prevent the Allies entering Spain following Operation Torch, the November 1942 Allied victory in North Africa. The plan was abandoned following the Allied invasion of Italy in September 1943.

== Aftermath ==
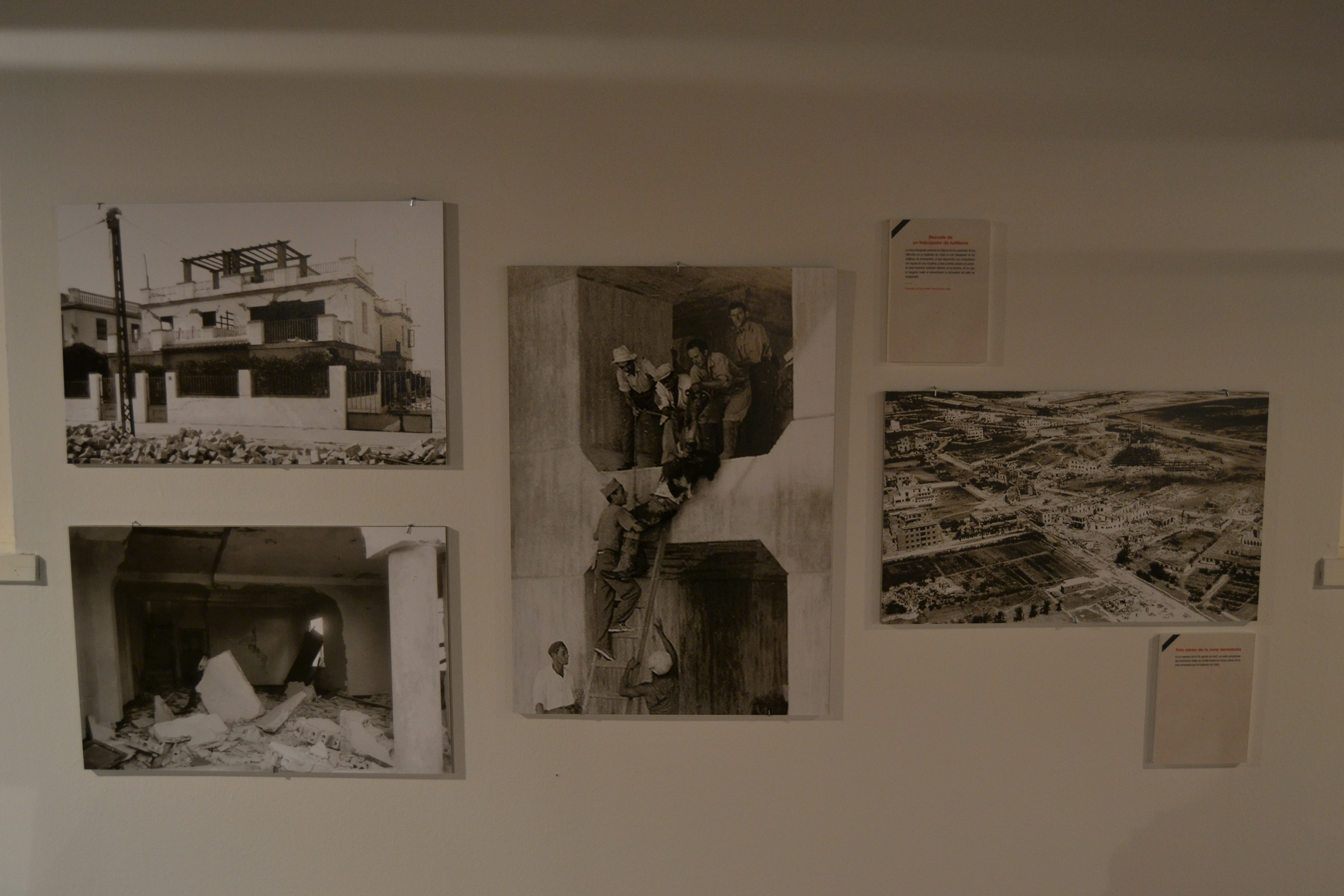
Photographs of the disaster

At the time of the explosion, Cádiz had a population of about 100,000, with the shipyard employing almost 2,500. It was the largest single employer in the city, and its destruction meant that many families no longer had any income. The shipyards were not opened again until they were nationalised in 1952, and it took until 1956 for steady work to be available there.

The situation was so dire that, among other initiatives, the following year the Francoist Regime decided to permit the return of the Carnival for which the city had been famous before Franco prohibited it after the Civil War. Rather than allow the use of the term "carnival", the Regime organised the "Fiestas Típicas Gaditanas", and allowed the population to compose their famous coplas, albeit under strict censorship.

== See also ==
- List of the largest artificial non-nuclear explosions
