= Horacio Echevarrieta =

Spanish industrialist (1870–1963)

Horacio Echevarrieta Maruri
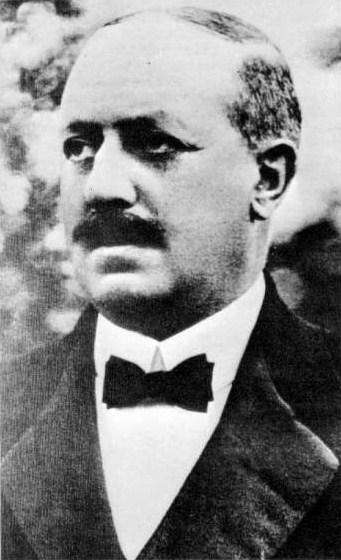
- Born: 15 September 1870; Bilbao, Spain
- Died: 20 May 1963 (aged 92); Barakaldo, Spain
- Occupations: Businessman, banker, politician

Horacio Echevarrieta Maruri (15 September 1870 – 20 May 1963) was a Spanish businessman, banker, industrialist, patron of the arts, politician and diplomatic mediator. In 1927, he founded Iberia Líneas Aéreas de España, S. A. Operadora, now known as Iberia.

== Biography ==
Born in Bilbao, the son of a mine owner, Cosme Echevarrieta, he expanded his father's activities and set up businesses in many fields, such as the merchant marine, shipbuilding and real estate. He was one of the shareholders of The Niágara Spanish Aerocar Co., Limited, which inaugurated the Spanish Aerocar at Niagara Falls, Ontario in 1916.

A diputado for the Radical Republicano from 1914 to 1917, in 1916 he bought the liberal paper El Liberal.

After being placed under house arrest for his involvement in the 1917 general strike, he stepped down from his post of president of the Chamber of Commerce, gave up his seat in parliament, which was taken over by his political and business ally, Indalecio Prieto, as well as from the leadership of the republicanism that he had inherited from his father.

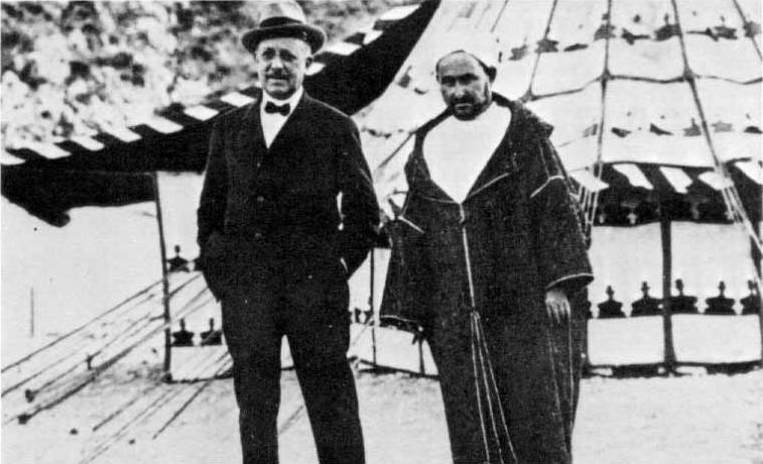
Horacio Echevarrieta and Abd el-Krim

Following Spain's catastrophic defeat at the Battle of Annual in 1921, when 10,000–12,000 Spanish troops died, he acted as a mediator between the Spanish government and Abd el-Krim in freeing the 300 Spanish soldiers captured, for which, as a Republican, he is said to have turned down King Alfonso XIII's offer of a title.

At his Malaga estate, he played host to visitors like King Alfonso XIII, General Miguel Primo de Rivera and the German naval officer and spymaster Wilhelm Canaris, head of the Abwehr, the German military intelligence service (from 1935 to 1944).

== Echevarrieta y Larrinaga shipyard ==
He had extensive dealings with Canaris and in 1925 signed a lucrative contract with Walter Lohmann to supply the German Reichsmarine with German-designed torpedoes and had also built a U-Boat for testing and training. As Echevarrieta became bankrupt, Lohmann supplied the monies for the contract from German Naval Command.

The German–designed prototype of the Type IA submarine, was built under the designation of submarino E-1. To recoup the costs of building the submarine, German Naval Command sold it to Turkey, which designated it as Gür.

Following the catastrophic Cádiz Explosion on 18 August 1947, which also completely destroyed Echevarrieta's adjoining shipyard, the company, the largest single employer in the city, employing 2,500 workers, was basically without work until it was nationalised in 1952, although it wouldn't be until 1956 that steady work would again be available there.
