= Soviet submarine S-56 =

Coordinates: 43.11342°N 131.891221°E

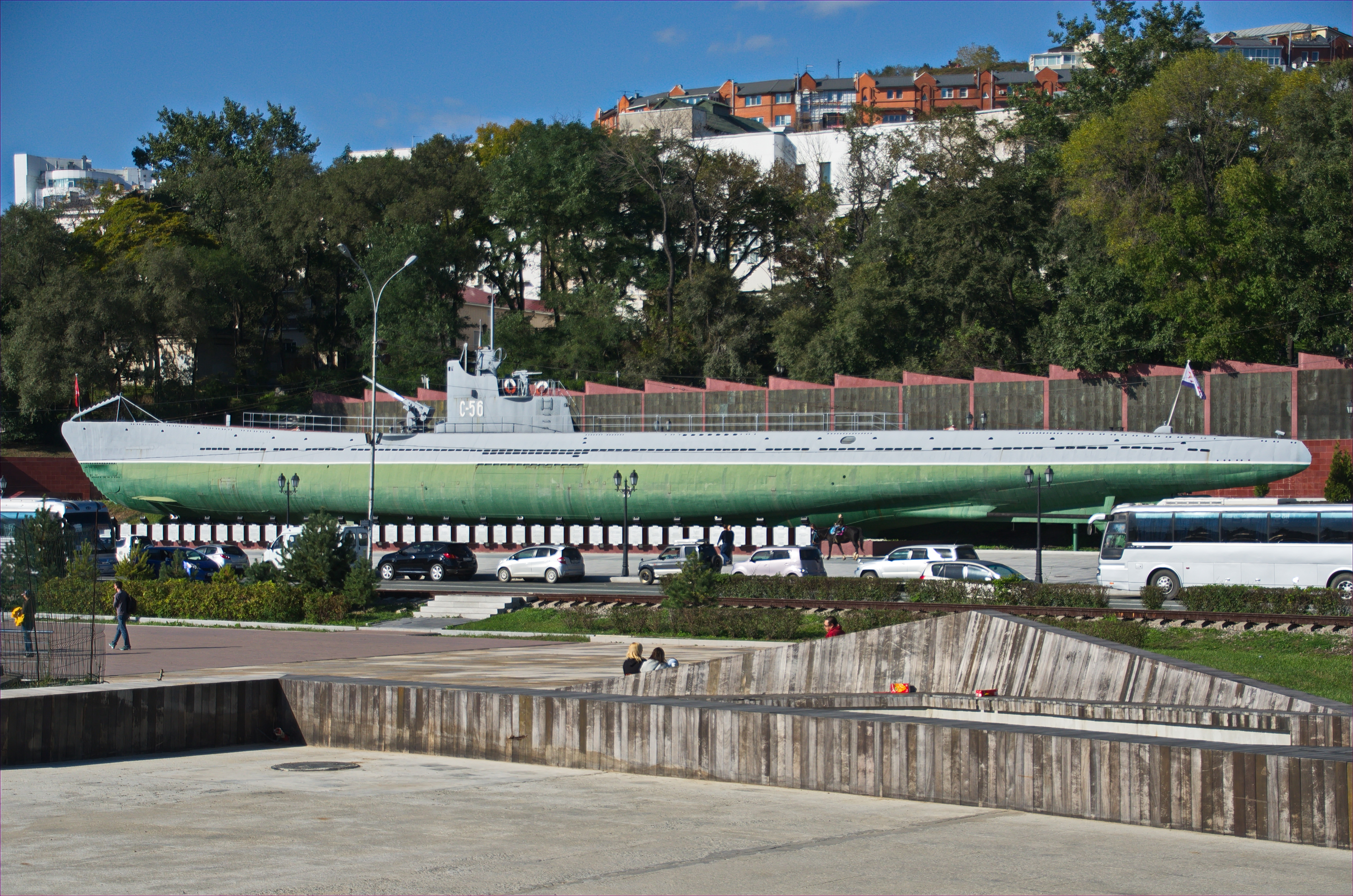
- S-56 on display in Vladivostok

History

Soviet Union
- Name: S-56
- Builder: Dalzavod, Vladivostok
- Laid down: 24 November 1936
- Launched: 25 December 1939
- Commissioned: 20 October 1941
- Decommissioned: 14 March 1955
- Fate: Stricken on 9 May 1975 and became a museum ship in Vladivostok

General characteristics
- Class & type: S-class submarine (Series IX-bis)
- Displacement: 856 t (842 long tons) surfaced; 1,090 t (1,070 long tons) submerged
- Length: 77.8 m (255 ft 3 in)
- Beam: 6.4 m (21 ft 0 in)
- Draft: 4 m (13 ft 1 in)
- Propulsion: 2 × diesel engines; 2 × electric motors; 2 × shafts
- Speed: 18.85 knots (34.91 km/h) surfaced; 8.8 knots (16.3 km/h) submerged
- Range: 9,500 nmi (17,600 km)
- Test depth: 80 m (260 ft)
- Complement: 45
- Armament: 6 × torpedo tubes; 2 × deck guns

Service record (World War II)
- Commanders: Kapitan vtorogo ranga G. I. Shchedrin; 1941–1946
- Victories: 4 merchant ships sunk (7,191 GRT)

S-56 was an S-class submarine of the Soviet Navy during and after World War II. She was laid down by shipyard #194 in Leningrad on 24 November 1936, shipped in sections by rail to Vladivostok where it was reassembled by Dalzavod. She was launched on 25 December 1939 and commissioned on 20 October 1941 in the Pacific Fleet. During World War II, the submarine was under the command of Captain Grigory Shchedrin and was moved from the Pacific Fleet to the Northern Fleet across the Pacific and Atlantic Oceans via the Panama Canal. After decommissioning, the submarine was turned into a museum ship.

== Design ==
The Srednyaya or S-class submarine (Russian: Средняя, lit. 'medium'), also called Stalinets class (Russian: Сталинец, lit. 'follower of Stalin'), was an ocean-going diesel electric attack submarine. Its pressure hull had seven compartments, and the Series IX-bis submarine's displacement was 856 tonnes (842 long tons) while on the surface and 1,090 tonnes (1,070 long tons) while submerged. It had a length of 77.8 m (255 ft 3 in), a beam of 6.4 metres (21 ft 0 in), and a draft of 4 metres (13 ft 1 in). It had two diesel engines to power it on the surface and two electric motors for when it was submerged, providing 4,000 shaft horsepower (3,000 kW) and 1,100 shaft horsepower (820 kW), respectively, to the two propeller shafts. This gave it a speed of 18.85 knots (34.91 km/h) on the surface and 8.8 knots (16.3 km/h) while underwater, and the submarine had a range of 9,500 nautical miles (17,600 km). Its test depth was 80 metres (260 ft), and as armament it had six 530 mm (21 in) torpedo tubes, one 100 mm (3.9 in) deck gun, and one 45 mm (1.8 in) gun.

S-56 was part of the Series IX-bis, which was a modification of the original three boats of the S-class, the Series IX. The main difference between them was the replacement of German components used in Series IX with Soviet equivalents that could be manufactured domestically.

== Commissioning ==
S-56 was laid down in Leningrad on 24 November 1936 before being shipped by rail to Vladivostok, where it was launched on 25 December 1939. The submarine was commissioned on 20 October 1941 with Grigory Shchedrin in command.

== Service history ==
The submarine was awarded the Order of the Red Banner and the Guards badge for its service.

Ships sunk by S-56
Date	Ship	Flag	Tonnage	Notes
17 May 1943	Eurostadt	(Nazi Germany)	1,118 GRT	tanker (torpedo)
17 July 1943	M-346	(Nazi Germany)	551 GRT	minesweeper (torpedo)
19 July 1943	NKi-09/Alane	(Nazi Germany)	466 GRT	patrol vessel (torpedo)
31 January 1944	Heinrich Schulte	(Nazi Germany)	5,056 GRT	freighter (torpedo)
Total:			7,191 GRT	

During the attack against Eurostadt, another torpedo hit and damaged the German freighter Wartheland (3,676 GRT) but the ship was saved because the torpedo was a dud.

== Bibliography ==
- Budzbon, Przemysław (1980). "Soviet Union". In Chesneau, Roger (ed.). Conway's All the World's Fighting Ships 1922–1946. Conway Maritime Press. pp. 318–346. ISBN 0-85177-146-7.
- Budzbon, Przemysław; Radziemski, Jan & Twardowski, Marek (2022). Warships of the Soviet Fleets 1939–1945. Vol. I: Major Combatants. Naval Institute Press. ISBN 978-1-68247-877-6.
- Polmar, Norman & Noot, Jurrien (1991). Submarines of the Russian and Soviet Navies, 1718–1990. Naval Institute Press. ISBN 0-87021-570-1.
- Rohwer, Jürgen (2005). Chronology of the War at Sea 1939–1945: The Naval History of World War Two (Third Revised ed.). Naval Institute Press. ISBN 1-59114-119-2.
- Yakubov, Vladimir; Worth, Richard (2008). Raising the Red Banner: A Pictorial History of Stalin's Fleet 1920–1945. Spellmount. ISBN 978-1-86227-450-1.
