= Sværholtklubben =

Bird cliff in Norway

Sværholtklubben (Norwegian); Spierta (Northern Sami)
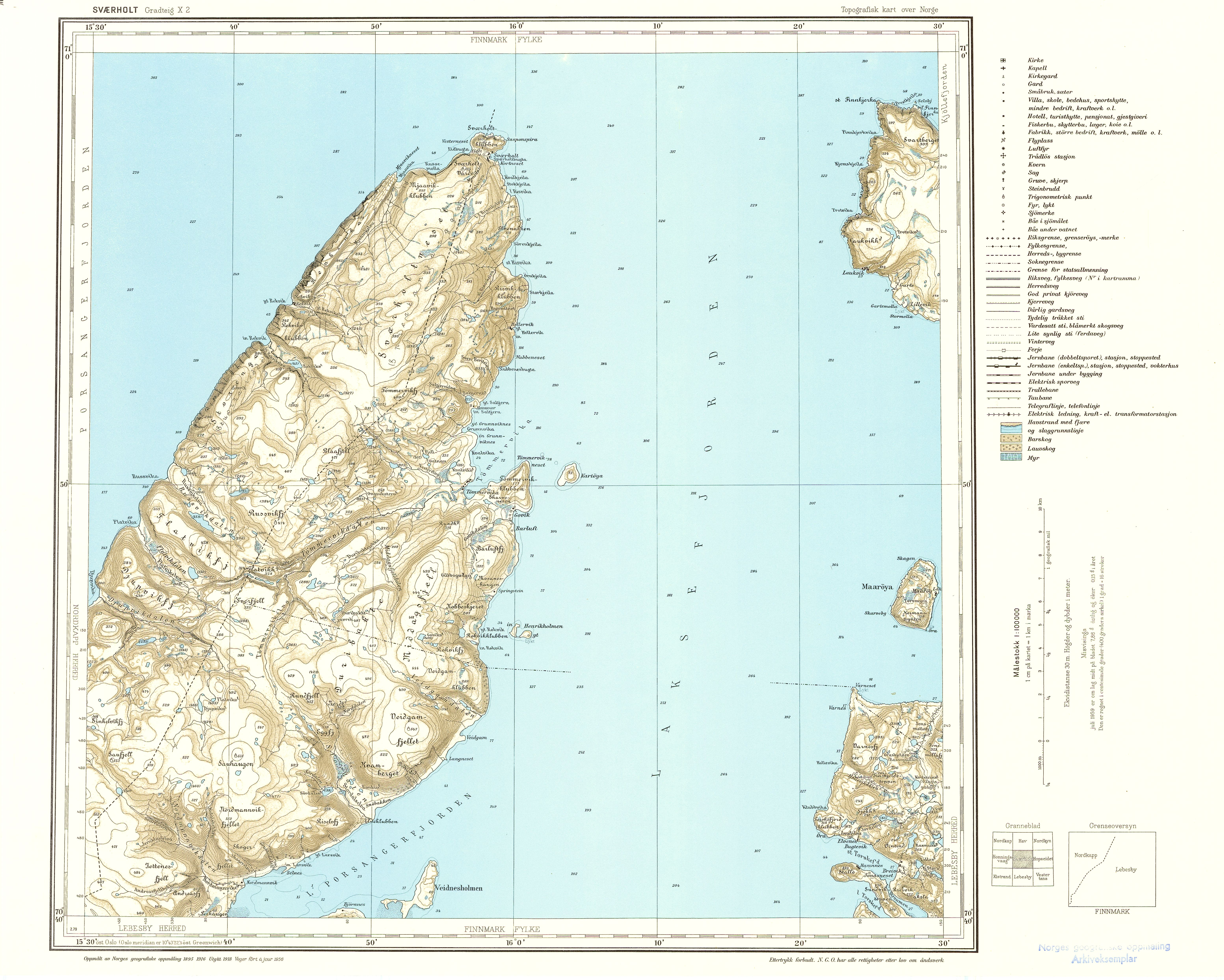
- 1956 topographic map of Sværholt

Highest point
- Elevation: 170 m (560 ft)
- Prominence: 145 m (476 ft)
- Isolation: 1.174 km (0.729 mi)
- Coordinates: 70°58′02″N 26°40′48″E

Geography
- Location of the mountain
- Location: Finnmark, Norway

Sværholtklubben (Norwegian) or Spierta (Northern Sami) is a mountain and bird cliff located at the tip of the Sværholt peninsula, situated between Porsangerfjorden and Laksefjorden in Nordkapp Municipality and Lebesby Municipality in Finnmark county, Norway. Rising approximately 170 metres (560 ft) high, Sværholtklubben has steep and precipitous sides.

== Etymology ==
The name Sværholtklubben derives from the nearby abandoned village of Sværholt, positioned just south of the mountain.

== History ==
During World War II, Sværholtklubben served as a strategic defense location for the Germans. In May 1942, they established the Heeres Küsten Batterie Svaerholtklubben 1/971, which included six 14.5 centimetres (5.7 in) guns capable of firing at targets up to 19 kilometres (12 mi) away. These heavy defense facilities played a crucial role during the wartime period.

== Avian Life ==
It hosts one of the largest breeding colonies of kittiwakes in the entire Finnmark region. The cliff's slanted shale layers create a series of ledges that ascend into the mountainside, providing an ideal nesting environment for tens of thousands of birds. Among the avian species found here are razorbills, guillemots, and white-tailed eagles. Due to its large amount of avian life and ecological importance, the bird cliff and the surrounding marine area were designated as the Sværholtklubben Nature Reserve in 1983.
