= TCG Gür (1936) =

Submarine

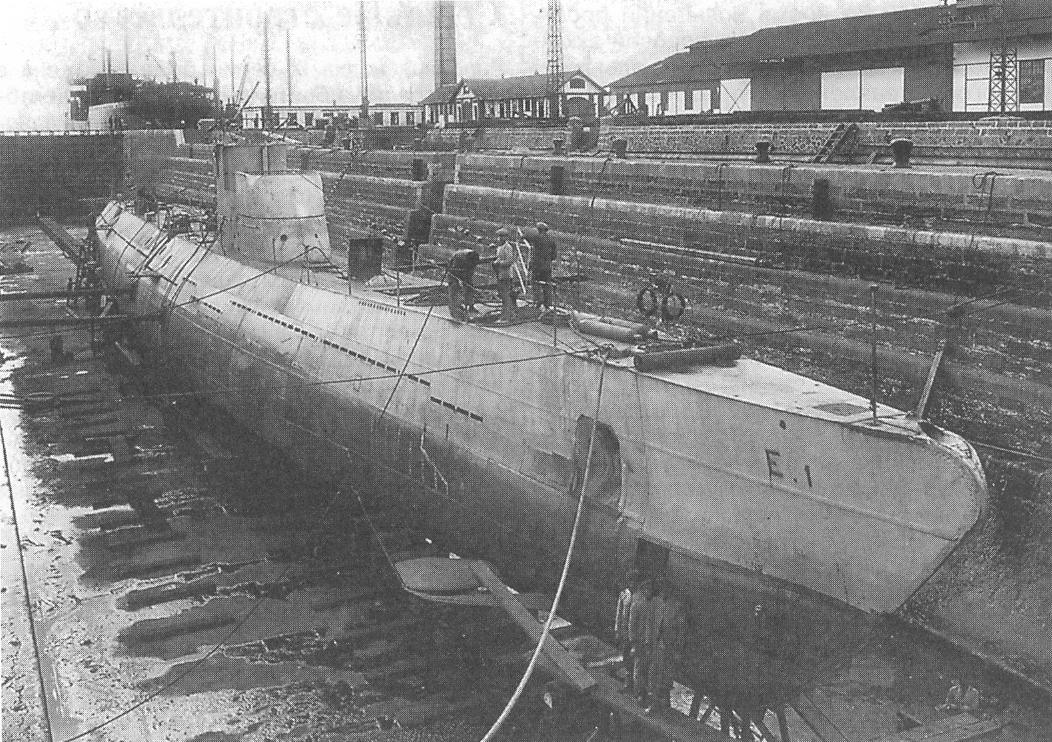
- As the Spanish submarino E-1 at the shipyard in Cádiz

Class overview
- Name: E-1, TCG Gür
- Builders: Astilleros Echevarrieta y Larrinaga, Cádiz (Spain)
- Operators: Turkish Navy
- Completed: 1

General characteristics
- Type: Diesel attack submarine
- Displacement: 650 tonnes (640 long tons)
- Length: 72.38 m (237 ft 6 in)
- Beam: 6.2 m (20 ft 4 in)
- Draught: 3.48 m (11 ft 5 in)

TCG Gür was a German-designed submarine built in 1929–30 by the Echevarrieta y Larrinaga Shipyard in Cádiz, Spain, and bought by the Turkish Navy in 1935 where it served until 1947. During its development and tests in Spain, it was designated Submarino E-1, but actually it was a prototype (lead ship) of the German Type IA submarine.

== Development and design ==
The Netherlands-based NV Ingenieurskantoor voor Scheepsbouw (IvS), a subsidiary of Deutsche Schiff- und Maschinenbau AG-AG Weser, started developing in the 1920s a submarine for Germany, circumventing the Treaty of Versailles ban on submarines. The Spanish government, during General Primo de Rivera's dictatorship showed interest for such a submarine for the Spanish Navy. Several German naval officers (including Wilhelm Canaris) visited Spain and struck a deal with a Spanish businessman, Horacio Echevarrieta. A single submarine was built in 1929–1930, it was launched on 22 October 1930, and was tested at sea early in 1931, under the manufacturer's designation of E-1, since no navy had yet commissioned the ship.

The government of the Second Spanish Republic showed a clear preference for American submarine designs. Designers and builders then went to offer the design and the boat for sale to return their cost. Echevarrieta's imprisonment for his connection with the October 1934 Revolution made the Spanish Navy lose any interest in the submarine, which was finally sold to the Turkish Navy in 1935.

Soviet engineers participated in the sea trials of E-1 and, as a result, three submarines of the improved E-2 class were built in the Soviet Union as the Soviet S class.

== Operational history ==
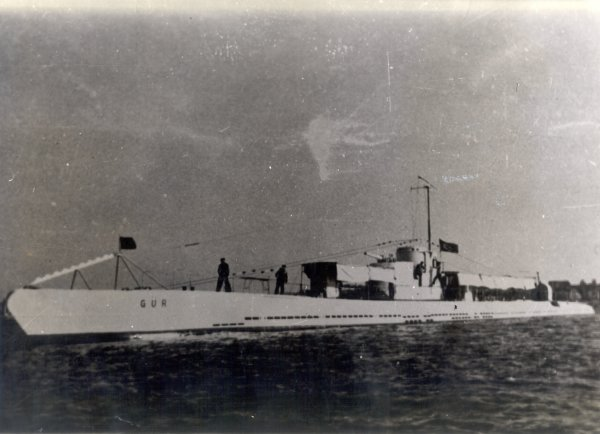
Gür in 1936

It was commissioned by the Turkish Navy on 29 December 1936 and served until 1947.

== Bibliography ==
- van Dijk, Anthony (1986). "The Fijenoord-built Submarines for Turkey". Warship International. XXIII (4): 335–339. ISSN 0043-0374.
