= Soviet Baltic Sea campaign in 1945 =

Soviet naval Baltic Sea campaign in 1945
- Part of the Baltic Sea campaign of the Eastern Front of World War II
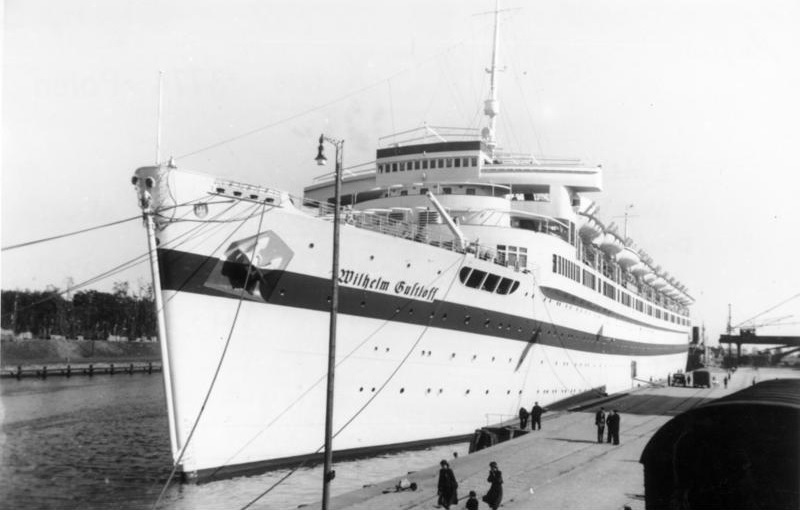
- Wilhelm Gustloff was the most notable victim of the campaign.
Date	January – 9 May 1945
Location	Baltic Sea
Result	Soviet victory

Belligerents
Germany	Soviet Union

Strength
escort units S-boots	20 submarines motor torpedo boats

Casualties and losses
2 destroyers damaged 1 submarine sunk 2 torpedo boats sunk 2 patrol vessels sunk 1-2 landing crafts sunk 1 auxiliary minesweeper sunk 3 large transports sunk 7-8 merchants sunk 1 tanker sunk 1 icebreaker sunk 1 tug sunk	1 submarine sunk 3 motor torpedo boats sunk
- 1 Swedish fishing boat sunk

The Soviet naval Baltic Sea campaign in 1945 was launched by the Soviet Navy to harass enemy shipping and naval military assets of Nazi Germany on the Eastern Front during World War II. Both submarines and surface units of the Soviet Navy were employed. The campaign scored successes during Operation Hannibal.

== Background ==
When Finland joined sides with the Allies in September 1944, the Soviet Navy could successfully avoid the German mine barrages at the entry of Gulf of Finland and quickly resumed submarine operations during the second part of the year. At the beginning of 1945 the Soviet Navy dispatched once again submarines alongside motor torpedo boats for coastal attacks but avoided the use destroyers and major warship. Twenty Soviet submarines were engaged into the offensive, performing more patrols compared to 1944 and displaying an increased aggressive behavior: cooperations with reconnaissance aircraft was sometimes performed.

== Submarine Engagements ==
On the night between 6 and 7 January, Soviet submarine S-4 was lost, likely rammed and sunk by German torpedo boat T-3 in Danzig Bay. It would be the only Soviet submarine loss of this campaign.

On 12 January, Soviet submarine K-51 shelled and sunk the neutral Swedish fishing boat Ib (15 tons).

On 16 January, Soviet submarine ShCh-307 torpedoed and sunk Henrietta Schulze (1923 GRT) south-west of Libau.

On 28 January, Soviet submarine K-51 torpedoed and sunk Danish merchant Viborg (2028 GRT) south of Bornholm.

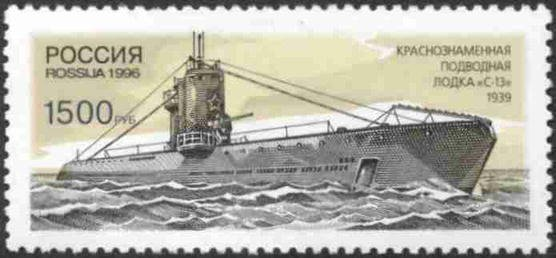
S-13 portrayed on a Russian stamp, issued in 1996

On 30 January, Soviet submarine S-13 under command of captain Alexander Marinesko torpedoed and sunk the large German liner Wilhelm Gustloff (25484 GRT) employed as transport ship for Operation Hannibal. The ship went down with up 9400 human losses, including both civilians and military personnel.

On 4 February, Soviet submarine ShCh-318 torpedoed and sunk German tanker Hiddensee (643 GRT) south-west of Libau.

On 10 February, Soviet submarine S-13 under command of captain Alexander Marinesko accomplished another significant success, torpedoing and sinking the large German liner General von Steuben (14660 GRT), like Gustloff also employed as transport ship for Operation Hannibal. The ship went down with up 3600 human losses, mostly wounded military personnel.

On 23 February, Soviet submarine ShCh-309 torpedoed and sunk German merchant Gottingen (6267 GRT) south-west of Libau.

On 17 March, Soviet submarine K-53 torpedoed and sunk German merchant Margarethe Cords (1912 GRT) off the Stolpebank.

On 23 March, Soviet submarine L-21 torpedoed and sunk the German patrol vessel V-2022 E.Colzmann off Kolberg.

On 24 March, Soviet submarine L-21 torpedoed and sunk the German tug Erni (105 GRT) off Kolberg.

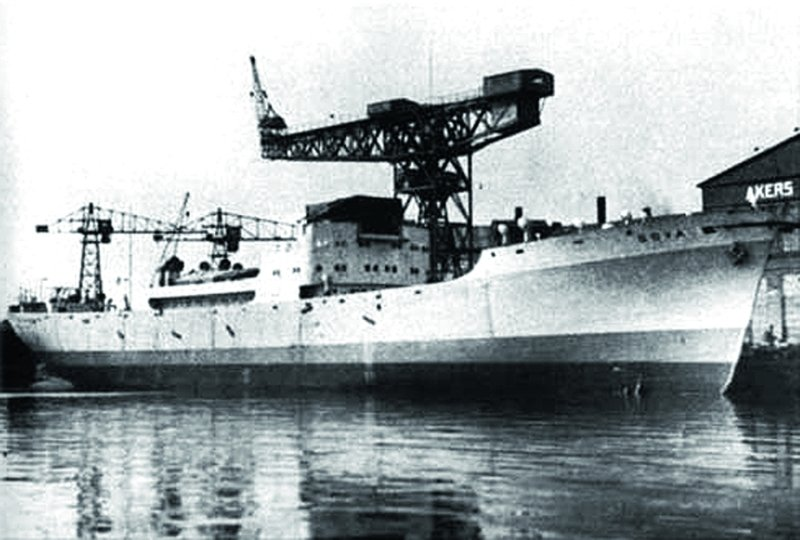
Goya in Akers shipyard in Oslo, shortly before completion

On 10 April, Soviet submarine ShCh-310 torpedoed and sunk the German merchant Ilmenau (1201 GRT) west of Liepāja.

On 11 April, Soviet submarine K-56 shelled and sunk the neutral Swedish fishing vessel Ramona (57 GRT) south of Utklippan.

On 17 April, Soviet submarine L-3 torpedoed and sunk the German troop transport Goya (5230 GRT) employed for Operation Hannibal. The ship went down with up 7000 human losses, including both military personnel and refugees.

== Motor torpedo boats engagements ==
On 18 February, German merchant Tolina(1923 GRT) was sunk either by Soviet motor torpedo boat TK-158 or aircraft.

On 18 March, during a clash between Soviet motor torpedo boats and German S-boots, the Soviet unit TK-66 was lost.

On 27 March, a subsequent clash between Soviet motor torpedo boats (D-3 class) and German S-boots caused the further loss of Soviet units TK-166 and TK-196 and other units damaged.

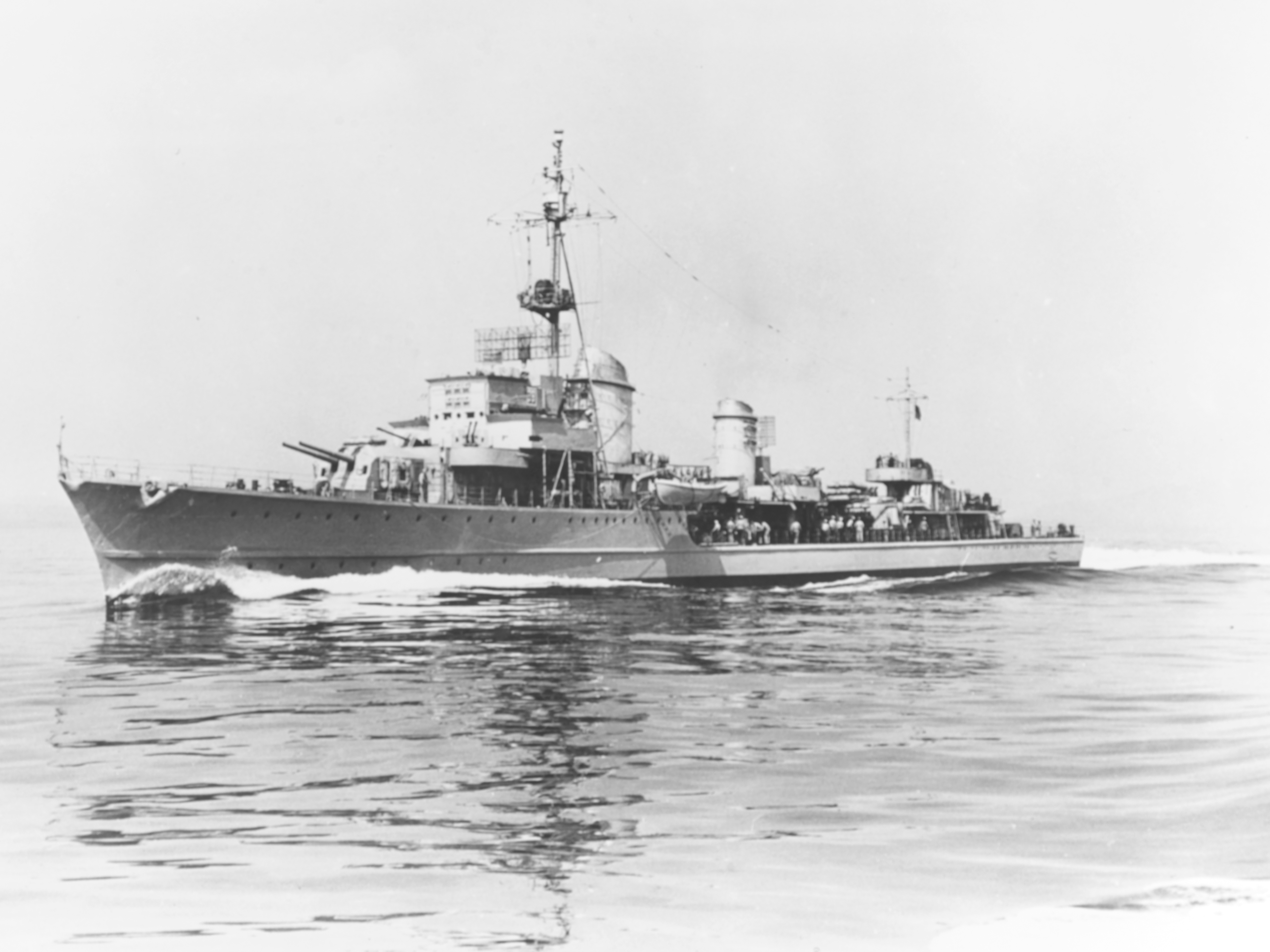
Z39 underway after the war. Sister ship of Z-34

On the night of 15/16 April, German destroyer Z-34 was attacked and torpedoed by Soviet motor torpedo boats in the bay of Danzig: the attack was performed by TK-131 and TK-141.

The ship received temporary repairs and with the surrender of Germany was transferred to the United States Navy that deemed the ship unworth of further repair and scuttled her.

On 25 April, German merchant Emili Sauber (2475 GTR) was torpedoed and sunk by Soviet motor torpedo boat TK-133.

On 26 April, German landing craft F-248 was torpedoed by Soviet motor torpedo boats TK-131 and TK-135 or sunk by aircraft.

On 6 May, German landing craft PiLB-43/I was torpedoed and sunk by Soviet motor torpedo boat.

== Minelaying operations ==
All the three Soviet minelaying submarines left to the Baltic Sea Fleet were employed for their intended purpose like the previous campaign.

On 26 January, Soviet submarine L-3 laid a first field off Ventspils: the only success scored was the sinking of German merchant Henry Lutgens (1141 GRT) on 29 January. A second field was laid on 2 February off Libau: the only success scored was the German icebreaker Pollux (4191 GRT) heavily damaged and beached on 2 February. A third field was laid on 23 March, scoring the following hits:

- On the same day, German auxiliary minesweeper M-3138 sunk.
- On 30 March, German merchant Jersbek (2804 GRT) sunk. Possible victory.

Between 8 and 13 March, Soviet submarine L-21 laid mines off Hela peninsula. The field scored victories over German warships:

- On 14 March, the German torpedo boat T-3 sunk.
- On 14 March, the German torpedo boat T-5 sunk (alongside T-3).
- On 15 March, the German submarine U-367 sunk.
- On 10 April, the German destroyer Z-43 is mined and damaged. The ship received emergency repairs and resumed operations.

On 30 March, Soviet submarine Lembit laid a field of mines off Wladyslawowo: the only known loss of this field occurred on 25 April with the sinking of German patrol vessel Vs-343

== Outcome ==
Fuel shortage restricted the number of German escort available for protecting ships and convoy and explain the Soviet success and the loss of a single Soviet submarine in action: while the campaign is not evaluated as a decisive victory (13 transports sunk, for 63000 GRT), submarine obtained some notable sinking. The sinking of Wilhelm Gustloff, General von Steuben and Goya was a demonstration of the deadly potential of submarine warfare. It is important to stress how despite being often erroneously described as noncombatant units, the ships actually possessed defensive anti-aircraft weapons and also carried military personnel (in addition to refugees).

== See also ==
- Baltic Sea campaigns (1939–45)
- Soviet submarine Baltic Sea campaign in 1941
- Soviet submarine Baltic Sea campaign in 1942
- Soviet submarine Baltic Sea campaign in 1943
- Soviet submarine Baltic Sea campaign in 1944
