= Soviet Baltic Sea submarine campaign in 1944 =

Part of the Baltic Sea campaign of the Eastern Front of World War II

Soviet submarine Baltic Sea campaign in 1944
- Part of the Baltic Sea campaign of the Eastern Front of World War II
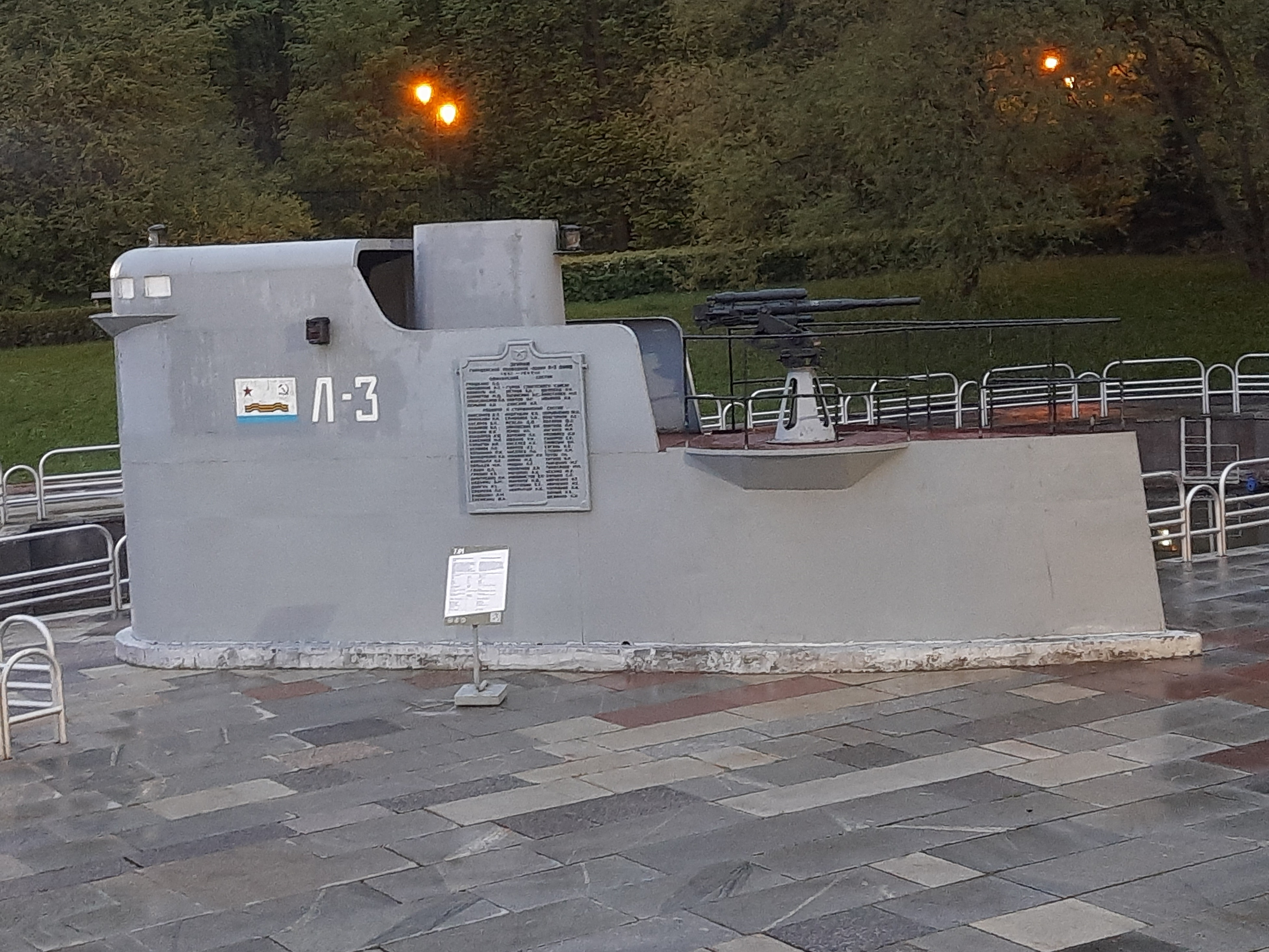
- preserved conning tower of L-3
Date	October – December 1944
Location	Baltic Sea
Result	Soviet victory

Belligerents
Germany	Soviet Union

Strength
Escort units	15 submarines

Casualties and losses
1 fleet torpedo boat sunk 2 minesweepers sunk 1 patrol boat damaged 9–10 merchants sunk 1 tanker sunk 1 transport sunk 1 dredger sunk 1 tug likely sunk 1 training-ship damaged 4 fishing vessel sunk and 1 damaged	None
- 1 Swedish passenger-ship sunk

The Soviet submarine Baltic Sea campaign in 1944 was launched by the Soviet Navy to harass enemy shipping and naval military assets of Nazi Germany on the Eastern Front during World War II.

== Background ==
After the failed offensive of the previous year, Soviets restrained for a further campaign until Finland signed the Moscow Armistice on 9 September 1944, ceasing war with Soviet Union and starting hostilities with Germany (Lapland War). This move, enabled the Soviet Navy to avoid the mine field barrages in the Gulf of Finland that caused heavy losses in 1942 and prevented success in 1943. Submarines ShCh-310, ShCh-318 and ShCh-407 were the first to operate in open Baltic from Finnish harbors and navigating out of the dangerous zones with aid of Finnish naval officers, they were soon followed by other 12 submarines. On 8 September (before the actual offensive), Soviet submarine M-96 sunk by mine in the Narva Bay. It was the only Soviet submarine loss in 1944.

== Engagements ==
On 6 October, Soviet submarine ShCh-407 torpedoed and sunk German merchant Nordstern (1127 GRT) west of Klaipeda. The ship was carrying about 450 Estonian refugees from Saaremaa; the most commonly cited death toll is 531.

On 8 October, Soviet submarine ShCh-310 torpedoed and sunk the German dredger Bagger 3 (400 GRT) and shortly later torpedoed and sunk the German transport ship Ro-24(4499 GRT), west of Ventspils.

On 9 October, Soviet submarine S-13 damaged with gunfire the German fishing vessel Siegfried (563 GRT) north of Danzig Bay.

On 12 October, Soviet submarine S-4 torpedoed and sunk German fishing vessel Taunus (218 GRT) off the Stolpebank.

On 13 October, Soviet submarine S-4 torpedoed and sunk German tanker Terra (1533 GRT) north-east of Leba. On the same day, Soviet submarine Lembit torpedoed and sunk the German merchant Hilma Lau (2414 GRT) north-east of Bornholm.

On 15 October, Soviet submarine Lembit torpedoed and sunk the German auxiliary minesweeper M-3619 Crabeels.

On 10 November, Soviet submarine ShCh-309 torpedoed and sunk German merchant Carl Cords (903 GRT) north-west of Ventspils.

On 21 November, Soviet submarine L-21 after having laid a field of mines, attacked and sunk with torpedo the neutral Swedish passenger-ship Hansa (563 GRT) north-west of Halskuk.

On 28 November, Soviet submarine K-51 sunk with gunfire the German fishing boat Sollind (260 GRT).

On 1 December, Soviet submarine K-51 sunk with gunfire the German fishing boat Saar (235 GRT).

On 4 December, Soviet submarine ShCh-407 torpedoed and sunk German merchant Seeburg (12181 GRT) inside Danzig Bay

On 7 December, Soviet submarine ShCh-309 torpedoed and sunk German merchant Nordenham (4592 GRT)north-west of Uzava.

On 26 December, Soviet submarine K-56 torpedoed and sunk German merchant Baltenland (3038 GRT) off the Polish north coast.

On 29 December, Soviet submarine K-56 torpedoed and sunk Swedish merchant Venersborg (1046 GRT) off Bornholm.

== Minelaying operations ==
Between October and December 1944, the Soviet Navy employed also the three left submarines (L-3, L-21 and Lembit) capable of minelaying operations in offensive actions, laying 77 mines.

On 11 October, Submarine L-3 laid a field of mines off Cape Arkona. These mines hit the following ships:

- On 14 November, German training ship Albert Leo Schlageter damaged
- On 20 November, German fleet torpedo boat T-34 sunk.

On 11 October, Submarine Lembit laid mines off Kolberg. These mines hit the following ships:

- On 23 October, German harbor tug Pioner-5 went missing. Most likely hit a mine of the field.
- On 24 November, German auxiliary patrol vessel V-305 Halberstadt damaged
- On 24 November, German fishing vessel Spreeufer (216 GRT) sunk.
- On 13 February 1945, German minesweeper M-421 sunk.

Another field laid on 3 December is not known to have scored successes.

On 23 November, Submarine L-21 laid a field of mines off Stolpebank. These mines hit the following ships:

- On the same day, German merchant Eichberg (1923 GRT) sunk.
- On 24 November, German merchant Elie (1837 GRT) sunk
- On 22 December, German merchant Eberhard (749 GRT) sunk. Possible victory.

== Outcome ==
Differently from the past offensives, no Soviet submarine was lost due mine or enemy action while a number of merchants and few German warships were sunk. While successful, the offensive begun too late to seriously interfere with the German naval evacuation of Revel between 18 and 23 September 1944.

== See also ==
- Baltic Sea campaigns (1939–45)
- Soviet submarine Baltic Sea campaign in 1941
- Soviet submarine Baltic Sea campaign in 1942
- Soviet submarine Baltic Sea campaign in 1943
- Soviet naval Baltic Sea campaign in 1945
