= Soviet Baltic Sea submarine campaign in 1941 =

Soviet submarine Baltic Sea campaign in 1941
- Part of the Baltic Sea campaign of the Eastern Front of World War II
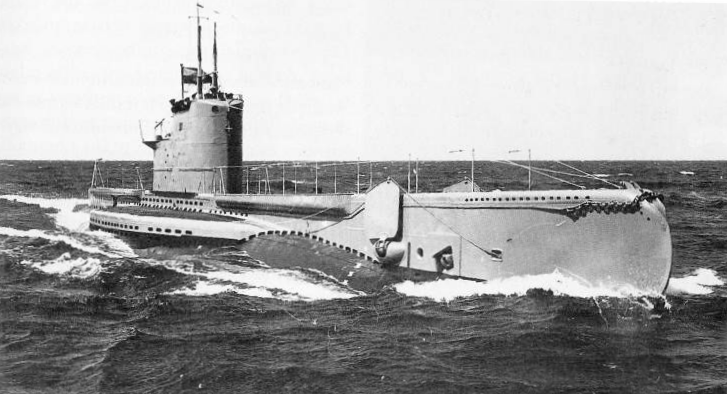
- Kalev lost during the campaign
Date	22 June 1941 – November 1941
Location	Baltic Sea
Result	Soviet failure

Belligerents
Germany	Soviet Union

Strength
5 submarines	29 submarines

Casualties and losses
1 submarine sunk 1 merchant sunk 3-7 other vessels sunk by mines, 2 damaged	16 submarines sunk

The Soviet submarine Baltic Sea campaign in 1941 was launched by the Soviet Navy at the early stage of Operation Barbarossa. The offensive was hampered by the quick German ground advance and the retreat of Soviet naval vessels from the main Baltic harbors.

At the beginning of the conflict the Soviet Navy operated a formidable force on paper, consisting of 75 submarines. However, only 35 submarines were operational: 15 of them were located in the Latvian port of Liepāja and were ordered to retreat to Tallinn due to the rapid German ground advance. During this redeployment the submarine S-3 was intercepted and sunk in surface action by German S-boats. Another 5 submarines were scuttled in the harbor, including the two former Latvian Ronis-class submarines. At the beginning of Operation Barbarossa, the German Navy at first operated only a relatively small force of vessels including five submarines; (U-140, U-142, U-144, U-145 and U-149); engaging the Soviet ones in anti-submarine hunts.

== Engagements ==
On 23 June, German submarine U-144 torpedoed and sunk Soviet submarine M-78 off Liepāja.

On 27 June, German submarine U-149 torpedoed and sunk Soviet submarine M-99 east of Dagö Island.

On 28 June, Soviet submarine S-10 was lost, most likely mined in the Irben Straits.

On 1 July, Soviet submarine M-81 was lost, mined off Vormsi, Estonia.

On 21 July, German submarine U-140 torpedoed and sunk Soviet submarine M-94.

On 2 August, Soviet submarine S-11 hit a mine and sank off Hiiumaa Island, Estonia. 3 crewmembers managed to survive, coming out from the wreck and swimming to surface (boat was at 11 metres of depth).

On 6 August, Soviet submarine S-6 went missing: wreck discovered in Swedish waters off Öland in 2012, loss due to mine.

On 10 August, Soviet submarine ShCh-307 torpedoed and sunk German submarine U-144 west of Dagö.

On or after 25 August, Soviet submarine M-103 sunk by mine off Vormsi Island, Estonia.

On mid-September, Soviet cruiser-submarine P-1 was mined and sunk off Hanko.

On 28 September, Soviet submarine ShCh-319 was possibly the boat responsible for a failed torpedo attack reported on German cruiser Leipzig off Sworbe.

On 23 September, Soviet submarine M-74 sunk by German aircraft in Kronstadt. Raised in 1942 but deemed not worth repairing.

after 29 September, Soviet submarine ShCh-319 was lost by unknown reason but most likely mined.

On 11 October, Soviet submarine ShCh-322 was likely lost due mines.

On 13 October, Soviet submarine ShCh-323 attempted to attack the German cruiser Koln, escorted by torpedo boats off Estonia, but she is spotted and the attack is broken off.

On 16 October, Soviet submarine ShCh-323 torpedoed and sunk German merchant "Baltenland" (3724 GRT) off the Swedish coast. It was the only merchant vessel directly sunk with torpedo by Soviet submarines in the Baltic during this campaign.

On 5 November, last communication from Soviet submarine ShCh-324, most likely sunk by mines near Tallinn.

On 14 or 15 November, Soviet submarine M-98 sunk by mine in the Gulf of Finland.

== Minelaying Operations ==
Apart from the early loss of submarine L-2 before she could lay the intended minefield in enemy waters, and the decommissioning of L-1 in August 1941, all the available Soviet submarines with minelaying capabilities were actively engaged. Due to the German defensive and offensive minelaying and subsequent British aerial mining, the success scored can't be confirmed.

On 27 June, Submarine L-3 laid mines off Memel. These mines hit the following ships:

- On 1 October, former Latvian merchant Kaija (1876 GRT), sunk.
- On 19 November, merchant Henny (764 GRT), sunk.
- On 22 November, Swedish tanker Uno (430 GRT), sunk. It is also possible she sunk on German defensive barrage.
- On 26 November, German merchant Engerau (1142 GRT), sunk.

Submarine L-3 laid another field on 19 July, off Brusterort, but it was unsuccessful.

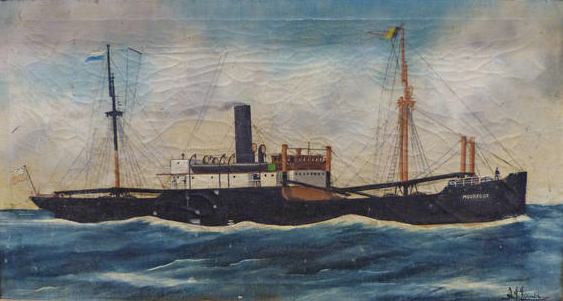
Frauenburg by A. J. Jansen

On 12 August, Submarine Kalev laid mines off Uzava, Latvia. It is possible that on this field were lost:

- On 26 September, German tender Mosel I (796 GRT), sunk.
- On 7 November, German merchant Frauenburg (2111 GRT), sunk.

On 17 August, Submarine Lembit laid mines west of Bornholm. On 1942 these mines hit the following ships:

- On 26 February 1942, Swedish ferry Starke (2459 GRT), damaged.
- On 30 May 1942, German merchant Orkan (1905 GRT), sunk. More likely aerial-dropped RAF mine.
- On 13 July 1942, German merchant Kathe O (1854 GRT), damaged.

Submarine Lembit laid another minefield on 5 November, in the Bjork Sound. Some Finnish ships were later damaged in the area, but Soviet mines were probably not responsible.

On early November, was likely lost the Soviet submarine Kalev off Hanko, due mines.

On 14 November, Soviet submarine L-2 struck three different mines before sinking off Keri island. 3 survivors. The boat was departing to lay mines in Danzig Bay.

== Outcome ==
In the end, the Soviet offensive submarine operations in 1941 failed to achieve a significant success (like other naval operations) apparently due to early poor command and organization, in addition to losses due to mines: the rapid ground advance of the Germans surprised the Soviets and further hampered naval operations with the loss of harbors.

Another problem for Soviet submarines was operating in shallow waters, making little room for depth maneuvers in addition to the risk of mines and air attack. The German ground advance forced all the Soviet vessels operating from Tallinn to retreat as part of the bloody Soviet evacuation of Tallinn, among the vessels lost there were the submarines S-5 and ShCh-301.

== See also ==
- Baltic Sea campaigns (1939–45)
- Soviet submarine Baltic Sea campaign in 1942
- Soviet submarine Baltic Sea campaign in 1943
- Soviet submarine Baltic Sea campaign in 1944
- Soviet naval Baltic Sea campaign in 1945
