= Soviet Baltic Sea submarine campaign in 1942 =

Soviet submarine Baltic Sea campaign in 1942
- Part of the Baltic Sea campaign of the Eastern Front of World War II
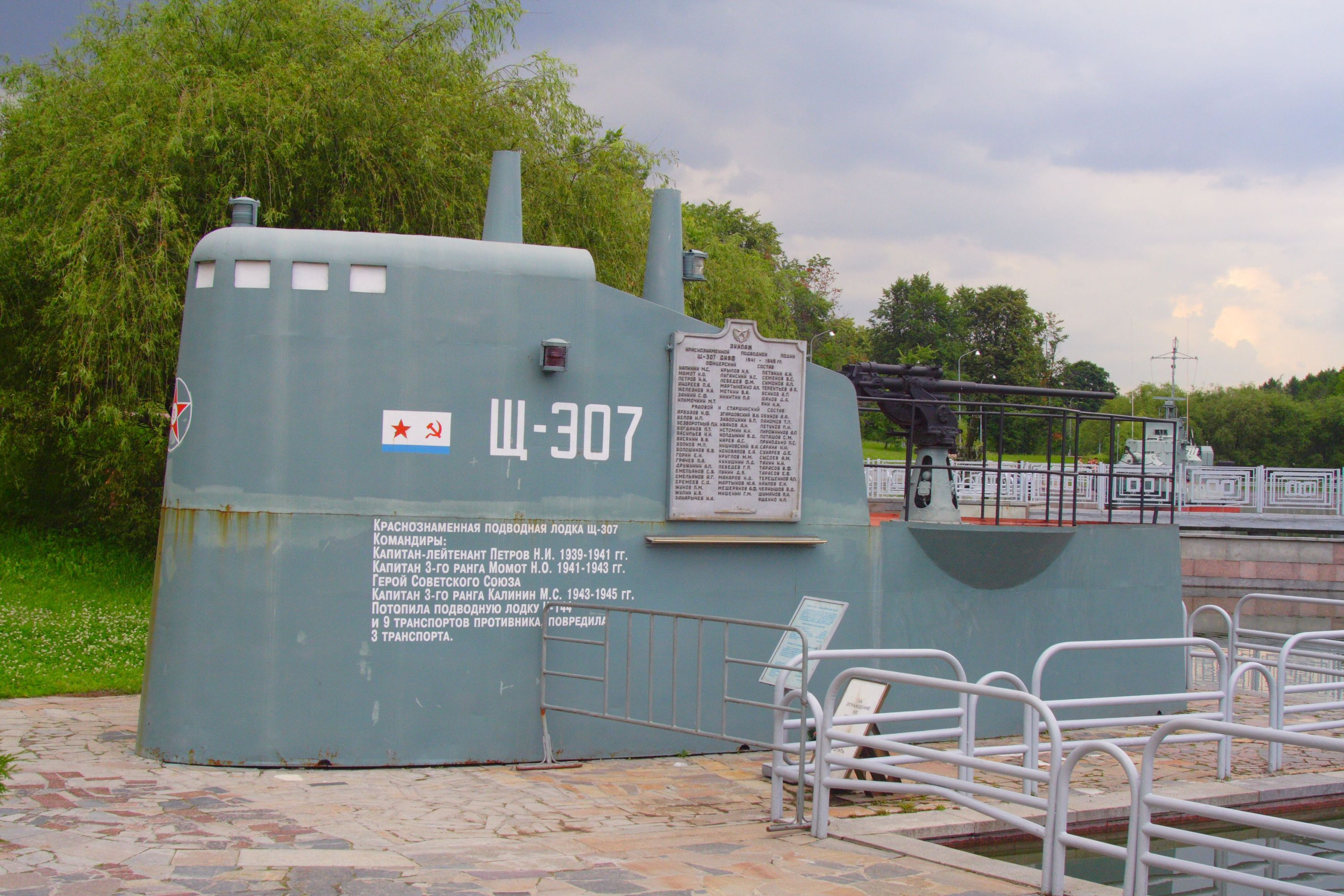
- preserved conning tower of ShCh-307
Date	1942
Location	Baltic Sea
Result	Limited Soviet success

Belligerents
Germany; Finland; Sweden (neutral)	Soviet Union

Strength
3 Finnish submarines Anti-submarine forces	30 submarines

Casualties and losses
18 merchants sunk 4-6 merchants sunk by mines	12 submarines sunk 6 submarines damaged

The Soviet Navy launched the Soviet submarine Baltic Sea campaign in 1942 to harass the strategic iron-ore traffic from neutral Sweden to Nazi Germany during World War II. The Soviet Union and the German Reich fought each other on the Eastern Front (1941–1945) during the war. The Allies also launched other operations - especially involving the Royal Navy - against the traffic.

== June and July Offensive ==
An important element for the Soviet operation was the small island of Lavansaari, located in the Gulf of Finland and able to accommodate the incoming submarines from Leningrad (under siege) as final step before the attempt to penetrate the Axis minefields. Despite neutrality during the WW2, Sweden agreed to the German request to laying extra fields of mines in Swedish waters. The first Soviet attack group consisted in 10 submarines departing from June 1942.

- ShCh-304 scored no result without breaking through Axis defenses.
- M-97 lost during a reconnaissance mission probably due mine.
- ShCh-317 sunk Finnish merchant Argo, Swedish merchant Ada Gorthon and German merchant Otto Kords. Damaged Danish merchant Orion. Sunk by Finnish minelayer Ruotsinsalmi on 14 July 1942.
- ShCh-405 probably lost due mine.
- ShCh-320 sunk German merchant Anna Karin Fritzen.
- ShCh-406 damaged German schooner Fides.
- ShCh-303 damaged German merchant Aldebaran.
- S-4 scored no success.
- S-7 sunk Swedish merchants Margareta and Lulea. Sunk German merchant Kathe and Finnish merchant Pohjanlahti. She scored the best success among Soviet submarines of the first group.

== August and September Offensive ==
The second Soviet attack group consisted in other 10 submarines, departing from August 1942.

- M-96 scored no success
- M-97 sunk by Finnish boat VMV-5 or mine. Only loss of this group.
- M-102 scored no success.
- L-3 sunk Swedish merchant Liljevalch. Laid a field of 20 mines off Sassnitz. On these mines was sunk the German merchant Franz Bohmke.
- ShCh-407 damaged by air attack and forced to return without results.
- ShCh-323 heavily damaged by mine and forced to return without results.
- Lembit heavily damaged German merchant Finland. Heavily damaged by escort and forced to return.
- ShCh-309 sunk Finnish merchant Bonden.
- ShCh-310 sunk German merchant Franz Rudolf. Damaged while returning by mine.
- S-13 sunk Finnish merchants Hera and Jussi H. Sunk Dutch merchant Anna W.

== October Offensive ==
The successes scored by Soviet submarines during the early stage of the campaign prompted a reaction in terms of deployment by Finland of their own submarines Vesihiisi, Vetehinen and Iku-Turso in anti-sub operations. The Soviet offensive in October involved the larger number of submarines (16) but suffered heavier losses with half of the units lost in action, scoring less success.

- S-9 damaged German tanker Mitteleer.
- S-12 damaged Geran tanker Sabine Howaldt and merchant Malgache.
- ShCh-308 probably lost on mines.
- D-2 sunk German merchant Jacobus Fritzen and damaged German merchant Deutschland.
- ShCh-307 sunk Finnish merchant Betty H. Despite being chased by Finnish submarines (especially Iku-Turso) managed to return home.
- ShCh-303 scored no result.
- S-7 sunk by Vesihiisi. 4 prisoners, including the commander.
- ShCh-406 sunk Swedish merchant Bengt Sture and Finnish merchant Agnes.
- L-3 laid fields of mines at Irben Sound, Libau and Utö. On these mines was lost the German merchants Hindenburg and Edith Bosselmann . In February 1943 the German merchants Tristan and Grundsee were also lost on this area, possibly sunk on old mines from the field.
- M-96 attempted twice to attack Finnish minelayer Ruotsinsalmi but failed.
- ShCh-302 sunk by mine and Finnish SB bomber.
- ShCh-304 probably lost on mines.
- ShCh-305 rammed and sunk by Finnish submarine Vetehinen
- ShCh-306 probably lost on mines.
- ShCh-311 sunk with depth charges by Finnish patrol boats VMV-13 and VMV-15
- ShCh-320 claimed as sunk by Finnish submarine Iku-Turso but most likely sunk on mines earlier according to Russian sources.

== Outcome ==
The overall number of ships sunk by Soviet submarine during this campaign has been evaluated to 18 ships totaling 37 789 tons, in addition to 10 vessels damaged and 4 vessels sunk by mines laid by submarines (in addition to another possible two sunk in 1943 on mines laid the previous year), while the Soviet forces lost 12 submarines with another 6 being damaged. Despite the heavy losses for few victories scored the Germans perceived the campaign as a threat due to the dwindling number of their transport ships and prepared stronger anti-submarine defenses for 1943. Old Soviet sources overestimated the victories scored to 51 vessels sunk (400.000 tons) All considered, the Soviet campaign was costly and managed to sink only a limited number of vessels but the operation accomplished in creating chaos in the Axis naval supply lines forcing alternate trade routes and investment in escort convoys (previously not assigned) and in greater anti-submarine defenses.

== Aftermath ==
A Soviet repetition of a similar campaign was made for 1943, but Axis forces has been strengthened: the exit from the Gulf of Finland was blocked by anti-submarine nets and Soviet submarines suffered heavy losses without penetrating this blockade.

== See also ==
- Baltic Sea campaigns (1939–45)
- Soviet submarine Baltic Sea campaign in 1941
- Soviet submarine Baltic Sea campaign in 1943
- Soviet submarine Baltic Sea campaign in 1944
- Soviet naval Baltic Sea campaign in 1945
