= Vladimir Konovalov =

Soviet rear admiral (1911–1967)

- Born: 5 December [O.S. 22 November] 1911; Nadiyne, Taurida Governorate, Russian Empire
- Died: 29 November 1967 (aged 55); Leningrad, Soviet Union
- Military career
- Allegiance: Soviet Union
- Branch: Soviet Navy
- Service years: 1932–1967
- Rank: Rear Admiral
- Commands: Soviet submarine L-3
- Conflicts: World War II
- Awards: Hero of the Soviet Union

Vladimir Konstantinovich Konovalov (Russian: Владимир Константинович Коновалов, born Vulf Kalmanovich Konovalov, 5 December 1911 – 29 November 1967) was a Soviet naval officer and submarine commander who was made a Hero of the Soviet Union in 1945. Born into a Jewish farming family, he graduated from the Frunze Naval School in 1936 and served in the Black Sea Fleet before joining the Baltic Fleet submarine L-3 in 1940. Konovalov commanded L-3 submarine from early 1943 until the end of World War II. On the night of 16–17 April 1945, the submarine sank the German transport Goya in the Bay of Danzig, killing most of the roughly 7,000 soldiers and refugees on board, one of the deadliest losses of life in maritime history.

After the war, Konovalov held command, staff and teaching posts and was promoted to rear admiral in 1966. He died in Leningrad in 1967 while serving as deputy head of a naval school for submariners.

== Early life and education ==
Konovalov was born on 5 December 1911 in the Jewish agricultural colony of Nadyozhnaya, in Yekaterinoslav Governorate of the Russian Empire, in what is now Zaporizhzhia Oblast, Ukraine. The colony had been founded in 1855 by Jewish settlers from Vilna Governorate, and the family of Arye Konoval, who later took the surname Konovalov, had lived there since 1869. He was born Vulf Kalmanovich, the son of Kalman Konovalov, and grew up in a large farming family. He probably adopted the name Vladimir Konstantinovich while at naval school.

During the Russian Civil War, raids by Nestor Makhno's forces led the family to move to Yuzovka, now Donetsk. After leaving school, Konovalov worked as a fitter at a factory. He joined the Komsomol while attending evening classes at the rabfak, or workers' faculty, of the Donetsk Mining Institute, now Donetsk National Technical University. In 1932, the Komsomol sent him to the Frunze Naval School in Leningrad, now the Saint Petersburg Naval Institute, from which he graduated in 1936.

== Pre-war service ==
After graduating, Konovalov served in the Black Sea Fleet as navigator of the Malyutka-class submarine M-51. From August 1936 to June 1938, he served in the fleet's air arm, including as a junior pilot-observer and navigator in an air squadron. He then joined the submarine D-4 Revolyutsioner, first as navigator and then as executive officer, until January 1939.

In November 1940, after completing the Higher Special Courses for Command Staff at the Kirov Submarine Training Unit, Konovalov was appointed executive officer of the minelaying submarine L-3 Frunzovets of the Baltic Fleet. The submarine was commanded by Captain 3rd Rank Pyotr Grishchenko.

== World War II ==
=== Executive officer of L-3 ===
Leninets-class submarine

Konovalov served in the war against Germany from June 1941. In his assessment of Konovalov at the end of 1941, Grishchenko wrote that his training qualified him to command a submarine but that it was desirable to keep him in his current post until the end of the war. Between the start of the war and the end of 1942, Konovalov took part in five combat patrols on L-3, which included patrol duty, covering the seaward flank of the army, laying minefields and attacking enemy shipping. On 18 August 1942, L-3 sank the Swedish steamer C.F. Liljevalch of 5,513 GRT. Ships also struck mines laid by L-3, among them the German steamer Henny (764 GRT) on 19 November 1941 and the German motor vessel Engerau (1,142 GRT) on 26 November 1941. After the 1942 campaign, his superiors judged that Konovalov had improved and recommended him for command of a submarine.

=== Commander of L-3 ===
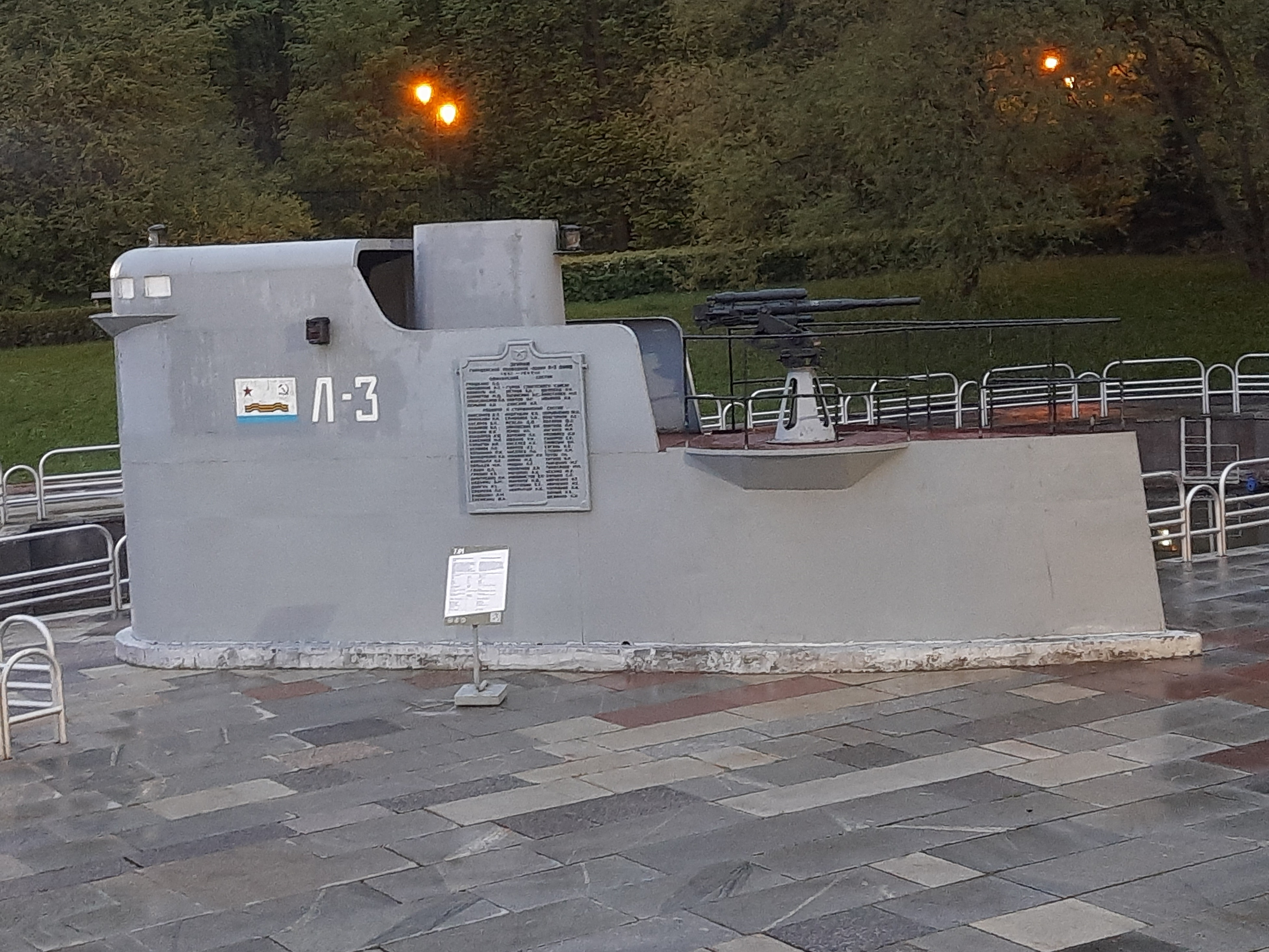
L-3 memorial

In early 1943, Konovalov succeeded Grishchenko as commander of L-3 when Grishchenko was transferred to the fleet's submarine department. In March 1943, the submarine was awarded Guards status for its actions during the 1942 campaign. Because it had been badly damaged, L-3 was judged unready for the 1943 campaign and was sent for repairs. Konovalov, then a captain lieutenant, was sent on a long assignment to the Pacific Fleet, where he trained on Leninets-class submarines, and he returned to the Baltic in October 1944. He resumed command of L-3, whose repairs had been completed in early 1944 and which had been declared fully ready for combat by October.

In early October 1944, L-3 sailed for operations in the southern Baltic. Its crew laid mines 12 nautical miles (22 km) northeast of Cape Arkona, a considerable distance from the Sassnitz–Trelleborg shipping lane that it had been ordered to mine. The mines nevertheless lay in a training area of the German Kriegsmarine. On 14 November 1944, the sail training ship Albert Leo Schlageter struck one of them and was badly damaged. On 20 November, the new torpedo boat T34 struck a mine nearby, which blew off her stern, and she capsized and sank. Fifty-five members of her crew were killed, together with two officers and 22 sailors from an artillery school. L-3's later attacks off the coast of Sweden and near Libau, now Liepāja, and Memel, now Klaipėda, were unsuccessful, which modern researchers attribute to Konovalov's overly cautious tactics.

The submarine was ordered back to base in November 1944. The brigade commander, Sergei Verkhovsky, rated the crew's performance as satisfactory overall but described Konovalov's execution of his orders as "unsatisfactory, unskilful, incorrect and overly cautious". Despite this assessment, the whole crew received orders and medals, and Konovalov was awarded the Order of the Red Banner. In his assessment for 1944, the division commander, Alexander Oryol, attributed Konovalov's lack of aggressiveness to inexperience on his first patrol as commander and concluded that he was "fully suited to the post of submarine commander".

During the 1944–1945 campaigns, L-3 made three combat patrols and laid mines on the approaches to enemy bases and along enemy shipping routes. It supported the 3rd Belorussian Front during the Samland offensive and the amphibious landing on the spit near Pillau, now Baltiysk, in East Prussia. Together with other Baltic Fleet submarines, it helped to block the area from the sea and disrupt communications between enemy supply bases.

=== Sinking of the Goya ===
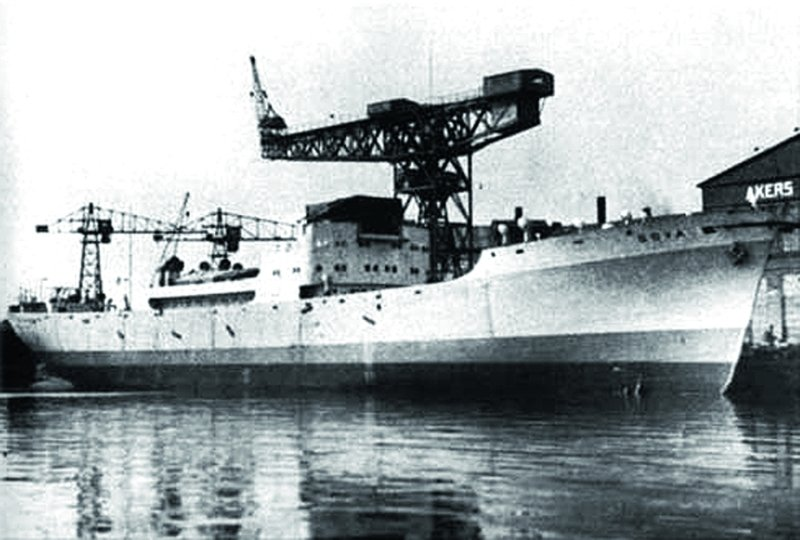
MV Goya

L-3 left on its eighth and final patrol on 23 March 1945, with orders to operate in the Bay of Danzig and block the approaches to the Hel Peninsula. On 16 April 1945, the German transport Goya (5,230 GRT) left Hel in a westbound convoy as part of Operation Hannibal, the German evacuation by sea from the eastern Baltic. The convoy also included the steamer Kronenfels and the steam tug Aegir, escorted by the minesweepers M-256 and M-328. Goya was crowded with about 7,000 people, among them soldiers, wounded servicemen and civilian refugees.

About four hours after leaving Hel, while still near the southern end of the peninsula, the convoy was attacked by Soviet bombers, and a bomb hit Goya but caused little damage. After rounding the Hel Peninsula, the convoy was sighted by L-3 several miles north of Cape Rixhöft, now Cape Rozewie. Goya was normally faster than a submarine, but engine trouble on Kronenfels forced the convoy to stop for about 20 minutes for repairs. To catch the ship, L-3 pursued it on the surface, at considerable risk, because its electric motors could not reach the required speed underwater. Shortly before midnight, Konovalov ordered a spread of four torpedoes to be fired. Two of them struck Goya, which broke in two and sank within minutes in about 76 metres (249 ft) of water. The escorting minesweepers hunted the submarine after the attack, but Konovalov evaded them.

Authors give the number of people on board as more than 6,000, 6,700, about 7,000 or 7,200, and the exact figure is unknown. Most estimates put the number of survivors at about 182 (176 soldiers and six civilians), of whom nine died shortly afterwards, although other accounts give 195. Together with the sinking of the Wilhelm Gustloff in the same area by the submarine S-13 under Alexander Marinesko, the loss of the Goya ranks among the deadliest maritime disasters, and some accounts consider it the deadliest in history.

On the night of 19–20 April, L-3 unsuccessfully attacked a westbound convoy. On 21 April, it fired its last torpedoes at a large convoy sailing from the Bay of Danzig to Copenhagen, again without success. On 25 April, the submarine arrived at its base in Turku, where its crew remained until the end of the war.

=== Record and Hero of the Soviet Union ===
Soviet assessments of L-3's wartime record grew over time. At the end of the war, the submarine was credited with 15 ships sunk, a figure that had risen to 28 by the late 1960s. By one Soviet-era count, L-3 ranked first among Soviet submarines, with 25 warships and transports totalling 51,918 tons sunk and four vessels damaged. Only 13 of the claimed sinkings, 10 of them by mines, can be traced in German records, and modern research credits the submarine with seven ships sunk and one damaged.

By a decree of the Presidium of the Supreme Soviet of 8 July 1945, Konovalov, then a guards captain 3rd rank, was awarded the title of Hero of the Soviet Union, with the Order of Lenin and the Gold Star medal, for his performance of combat missions and his personal courage.

== Post-war career ==
In 1950, Konovalov graduated from the Voroshilov Naval Academy, now the N. G. Kuznetsov Naval Academy. He then headed the department of naval tactics at the 2nd Baltic Higher Naval School. He later served as chief of staff and then commander of a Baltic Fleet submarine brigade, as deputy head of a department of the Directorate of Naval Educational Institutions, and as deputy chief of staff for combat control of the Northern Fleet. On 7 May 1966, he was promoted from captain 1st rank to rear admiral. He was then appointed deputy head of the Lenin Komsomol Higher Naval School of Submarine Navigation in Leningrad.

According to the historian Mark Steinberg, the school's commander, Rear Admiral Pavel Paramoshkin, regularly harassed and humiliated Konovalov out of antisemitic hostility. Steinberg writes that the conflict led to a heart attack, from which Konovalov died the following day, on 29 November 1967. He was buried in Leningrad.

== Awards and honors ==
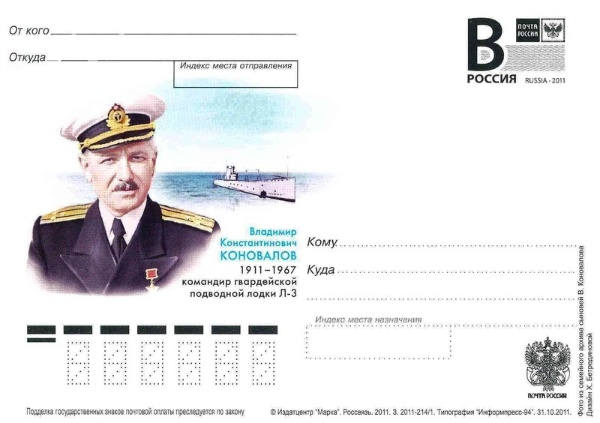
2011 Russian postal envelope featuring Konovalov

His awards include:

Hero of the Soviet Union (8 July 1945)
Order of Lenin, thrice (22 September 1942, 8 July 1945, 30 December 1956)
Order of the Red Banner, twice (22 December 1944, 26 February 1953)
Order of Ushakov, 2nd class (13 March 1945)
Order of the Patriotic War, 1st class (18 December 1942)
Order of the Red Star (6 November 1947)
Medal "For Battle Merit"
Medal "For the Defence of Leningrad" (1942)
Medal "For the Capture of Königsberg" (1945)
Medal "For the Victory over Germany in the Great Patriotic War 1941–1945" (1945)

- jubilee medals

On 22 June 2018, a portrait of Konovalov was added to the Gallery of Heroes at the Donetsk Museum of Local History. The conning tower of L-3 stands as a monument on Poklonnaya Hill in Moscow, with a memorial plaque listing the names of all its crew members.

In the book and subsequent film The Hunt for Red October, the fictional Soviet Alfa class nuclear-powered attack submarine is named the V.K. Konovalov.
