= Soviet Baltic Sea submarine campaign in 1943 =

World War II Soviet naval campaign

Soviet submarine Baltic Sea campaign in 1943
- Part of the Baltic Sea campaign of the Eastern Front of World War II
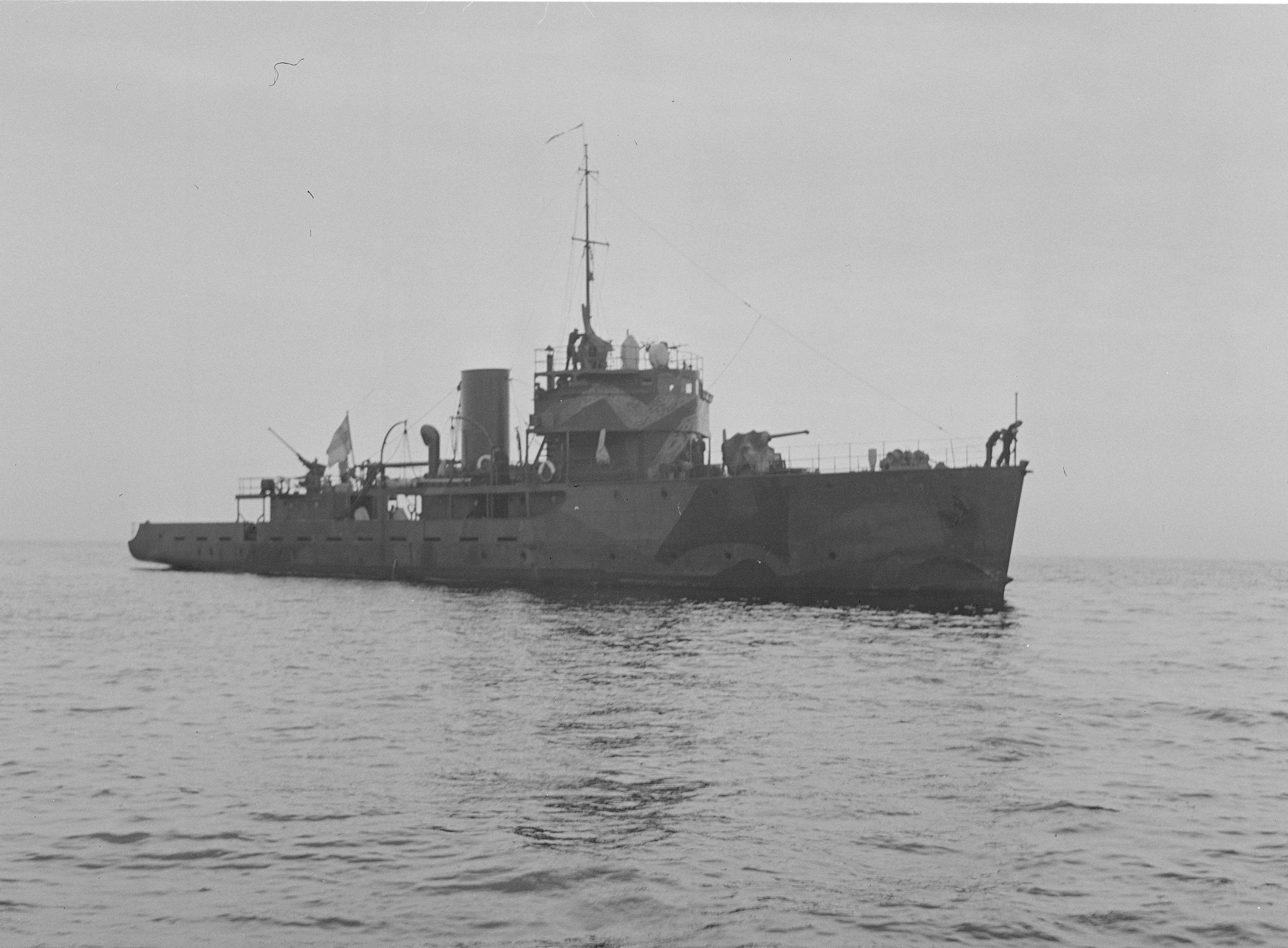
- Ruotsinsalmi, part of the anti-submarine defense
Date	April – August 1943
Location	Gulf of Finland
Result	Axis victory

Belligerents
Germany; Finland	Soviet Union

Strength
2 minelayers Anti-submarine boats	5 submarines

Casualties and losses
None (Riilahti sunk as aftermath)	4 submarines lost

The Soviet submarine Baltic Sea campaign in 1943 was launched by the Soviet Navy to harass the strategic iron ore traffic from neutral Sweden to Nazi Germany on the Eastern Front during the WWII. Other operations were launched by Allies, especially by the Royal Navy. The offensive was a repetition of the previous campaign in 1942 but resulted in a failed outcome.

== Background ==
The previous Soviet submarine offensive in 1942 resulted in heavy losses for the Soviets but achieved in sinking some ships and caused delays for the concerned Germans. This was achieved despite the presence of over 13,000 defensive mines. Preparations were made in the winter of 1942 to prevent the intrusion of Soviet submarines in the open Baltic for the coming year. A decisive element of the Axis blockade was laying a double anti-submarine net, named "Walrus", across the Gulf of Finland from Porkkala (Finland) to Naissaar (Estonia). Additionally, the German Navy laid another 7,293 new mines while Finland laid another 1,965 mines to bolster the existing ones.

== Offensive ==
At the beginning of the year the Soviets could engage in offensive four Stalinets-class submarines, nine Shchuka class and three Malyutka class. ShCh-323 was the first vessel to attempt passing the blockade but was sunk by mines on 30 April 1943 (five survivors). ShCh-303 failed to pass the nets and returned to Lavansaari after encounters with German vessels. ShCh-408 was detected and sunk by Finnish minelayer Ruotsinsalmi with depth charges, while ShCh-406 suffered the same fate by Finnish minelayer Riilahti and German small boats.

After the failures of the Shchuka-class, the Soviets attempted to breakthrough with the more powerful S-9 and S-12: both of them never returned and were lost to mines in August 1943, marking an end of the Soviets' attempt to penetrate the blockade.

== Aftermath ==
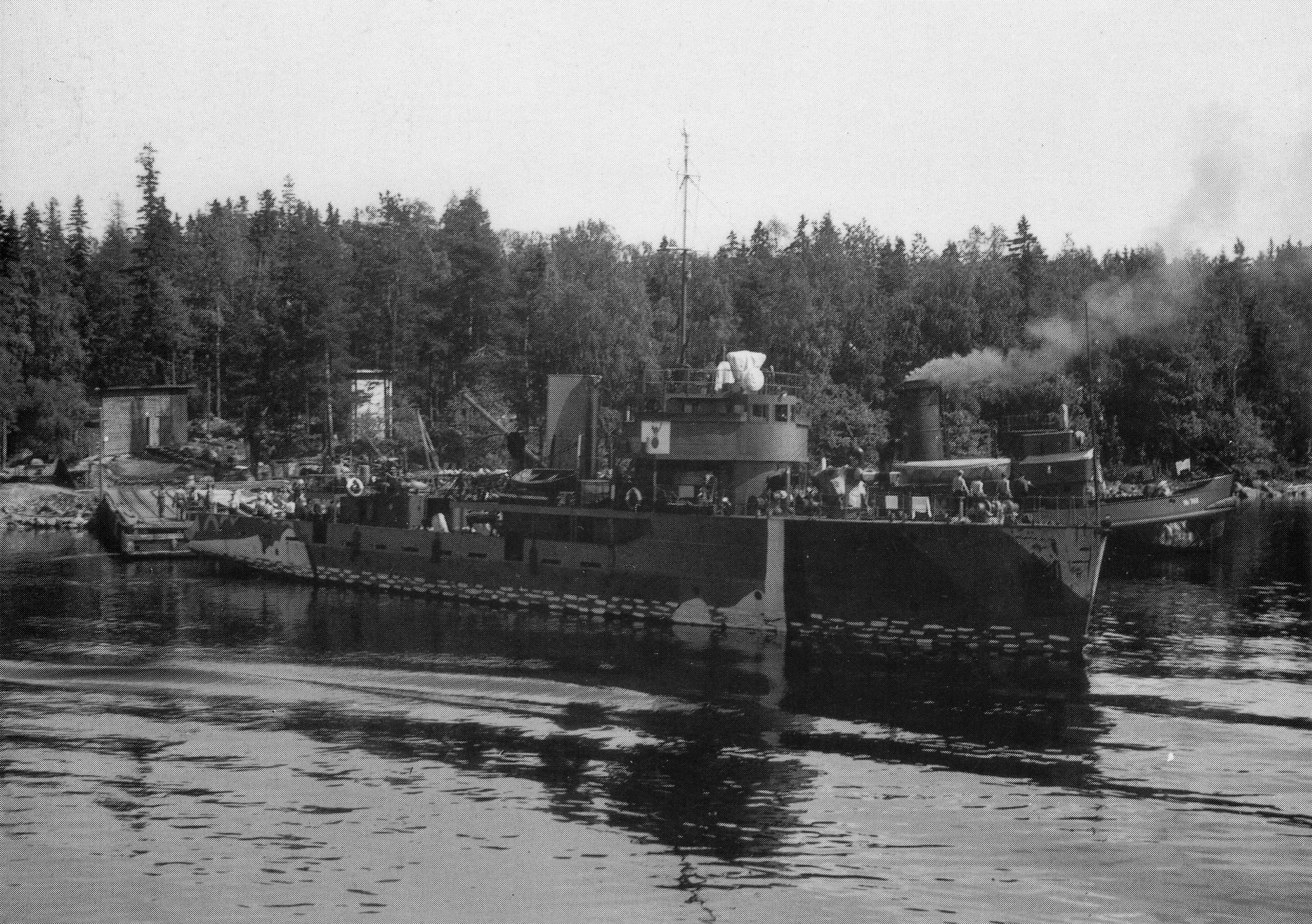
Finnish minelayer Riilahti

The Finnish minelayers Ruotsinsalmi and Riilahti has been actively engaged in the campaign, sinking one submarine each. On 23 August 1943, during another anti-submarine patrol, Riilahti was sunk by soviet motor torpedo boat TK-93.

== Outcome ==
No Soviet attempt to break the Axis blockade achieved success: no ship was sunk by Soviet submarines in the Baltic Sea during 1943, making the outcome of the offensive a decisive Axis success.

== See also ==
- Baltic Sea campaigns (1939–45)
- Soviet submarine Baltic Sea campaign in 1941
- Soviet submarine Baltic Sea campaign in 1942
- Soviet submarine Baltic Sea campaign in 1944
- Soviet naval Baltic Sea campaign in 1945
