= Soviet submarine S-7 =

Soviet submarine

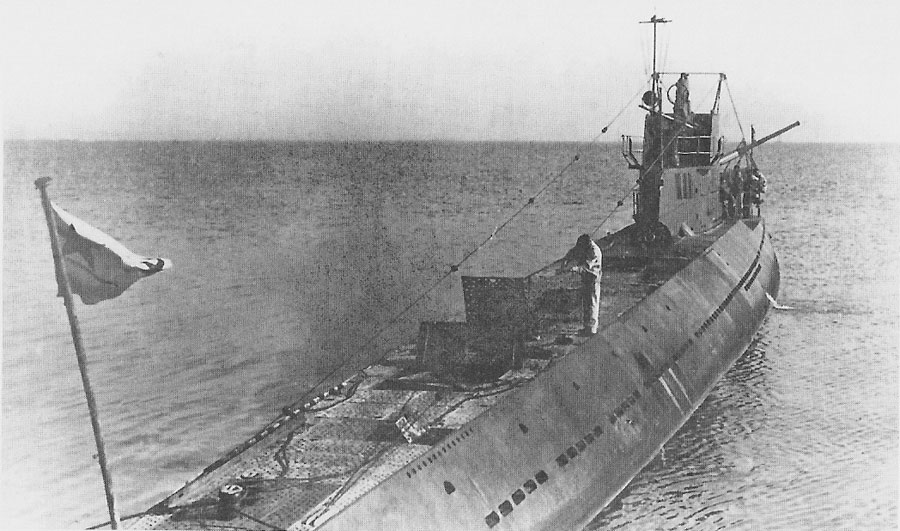
- S-7 in Baltic Sea, circa 1941

History

Soviet Union
- Name: S-7
- Builder: Krasnoye Sormovo, Gorkiy
- Laid down: 14 December 1936
- Launched: 5 April 1937
- Commissioned: 30 June 1940
- Fate: Sunk on 21 October 1942

General characteristics
- Class & type: S-class submarine (Series IX-bis)
- Displacement: 856 t (842 long tons) surfaced; 1,090 t (1,070 long tons) submerged
- Length: 77.8 m (255 ft 3 in)
- Beam: 6.4 m (21 ft 0 in)
- Draft: 4 m (13 ft 1 in)
- Propulsion: 2 × diesel engines; 2 × electric motors; 2 × shafts
- Speed: 18.85 knots (34.91 km/h) surfaced; 8.8 knots (16.3 km/h) submerged
- Range: 9,500 nmi (17,600 km)
- Test depth: 80 m (260 ft)
- Complement: 45
- Armament: 6 × torpedo tubes; 2 × deck guns

S-7 was an S-class submarine (Series IX-bis) of the Soviet Navy. Her keel was laid down by Krasnoye Sormovo in Gorkiy on 14 December 1936. She was launched on 5 April 1937 and commissioned on 30 June 1940 in the Baltic Fleet. During World War II, the submarine was under the command of Captain Sergei Prokofievich Lisin and took part in the Soviet submarine Baltic Sea campaign in 1942. S-7 scored victories, but was sunk in action.

== Design ==
The Srednyaya or S-class submarine (Russian: Средняя, lit. 'medium'), also called the Stalinets class (Russian: Сталинец, lit. 'follower of Stalin'), was an ocean-going diesel electric attack submarine. Its pressure hull had seven compartments, and the Series IX-bis submarine's displacement was 856 tonnes (842 long tons) while on the surface and 1,090 tonnes (1,070 long tons) while submerged. It had a length of 77.8 m (255 ft 3 in), a beam of 6.4 metres (21 ft 0 in), and a draft of 4 metres (13 ft 1 in). It had two diesel engines to power it on the surface and two electric motors for when it was submerged, providing 4,000 shaft horsepower (3,000 kW) and 1,100 shaft horsepower (820 kW), respectively, to the two propeller shafts. This gave it a speed of 18.85 knots (34.91 km/h) on the surface and 8.8 knots (16.3 km/h) while underwater, and the submarine had a range of 9,500 nautical miles (17,600 km). Its test depth was 80 metres (260 ft), and as armament it had six 530 mm (21 in) torpedo tubes, one 100 mm (3.9 in) deck gun, and one 45 mm (1.8 in) gun.

S-7 was part of the Series IX-bis, which was a modification of the original three boats of the S-class, the Series IX. The main difference between them was the replacement of German components used in Series IX with Soviet equivalents that could be manufactured domestically.

== Service history ==
The submarine made all her victories in the summer of 1942, having some success against the German-Swedish iron ore shipping lines (the main target of the 1942 Soviet submarine campaign).

Ships sunk by S-7
| Date | Ship | Flag | Tonnage | Notes |
|---|---|---|---|---|
| 9 July 1942 | Margareta | (Sweden) | 1,272 GRT | freighter (torpedo) |
| 11 July 1942 | Lulea | (Sweden) | 5,611 GRT | freighter (torpedo) |
| 30 July 1942 | Kathe | (Nazi Germany) | 1,599 GRT | freighter (torpedo) |
| 5 August 1942 | Pohjanlahti | (Finland) | 682 GRT | freighter (deck gun) |
| Total: | | | 9,164 GRT | |

On 27 July 1942 S-7 also attacked the German merchant Ellen Larsen (1,938 GRT): the torpedoes missed and S-7 opened fire with her gun. As result the merchant was driven ashore.

== Loss ==
While attempting a new campaign (after the successful summer one), S-7 was attacked, torpedoed and sunk by the Vesihiisi.

Four crewmembers were saved and captured, including the commander Lisin. Commander Lisin was believed killed in action and was awarded post-mortem the distinction, Hero of the Soviet Union. Once Finland signed an armistice with the Allies in 1944, Lisin was freed and was sent by the Soviets to an NKVD special camp. However accusations against him were dropped (he kept the title of Hero) and became a military instructor at an officer school.

== Discovery of wreck ==
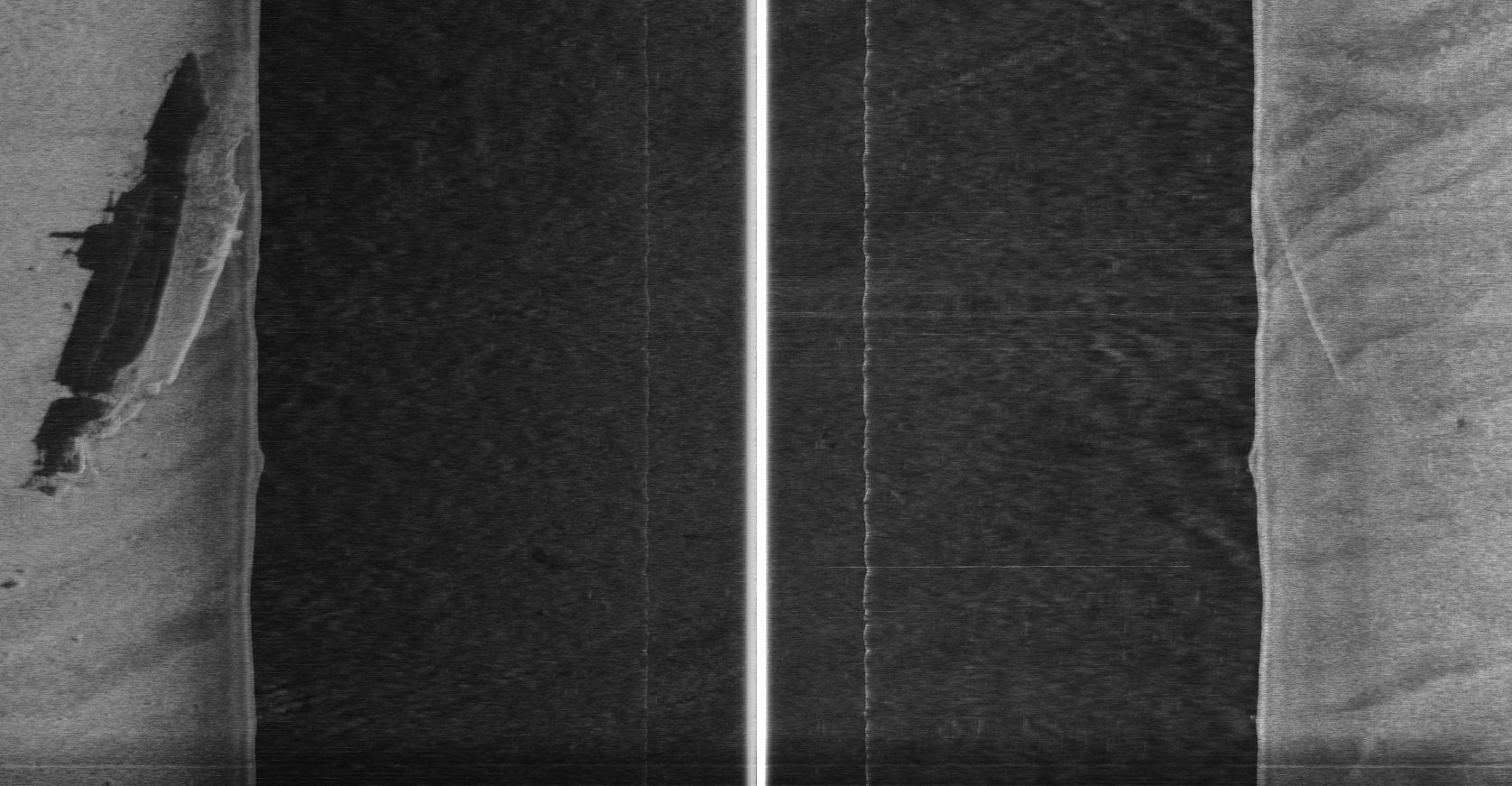
Side-scan sonar 200 kHz 2 m × 65 m (6.6 ft × 213.3 ft) of the wreck, by Björn Rosenlöf in the Swerdish-Åland search team.

In July 1998, the wreck of S-7 was found. The official data of war archives alleges that S-7 was torpedoed in Finnish waters, but the submarine was found in Swedish territorial waters – east of Söderarm in Stockholm's northern archipelago.

== Bibliography ==
- Budzbon, Przemysław (1980). "Soviet Union". In Chesneau, Roger (ed.). Conway's All the World's Fighting Ships 1922–1946. Conway Maritime Press. pp. 318–346. ISBN 0-85177-146-7.
- Budzbon, Przemysław; Radziemski, Jan & Twardowski, Marek (2022). Warships of the Soviet Fleets 1939–1945. Vol. I: Major Combatants. Naval Institute Press. ISBN 978-1-68247-877-6.
- Polmar, Norman & Noot, Jurrien (1991). Submarines of the Russian and Soviet Navies, 1718–1990. Naval Institute Press. ISBN 0-87021-570-1.
- Rohwer, Jürgen (2005). Chronology of the War at Sea 1939–1945: The Naval History of World War Two (Third Revised ed.). Naval Institute Press. ISBN 1-59114-119-2.
- Yakubov, Vladimir; Worth, Richard (2008). Raising the Red Banner: A Pictorial History of Stalin's Fleet 1920–1945. Spellmount. ISBN 978-1-86227-450-1.
