= Leninets-class submarine =

Soviet WW2-era submarine class

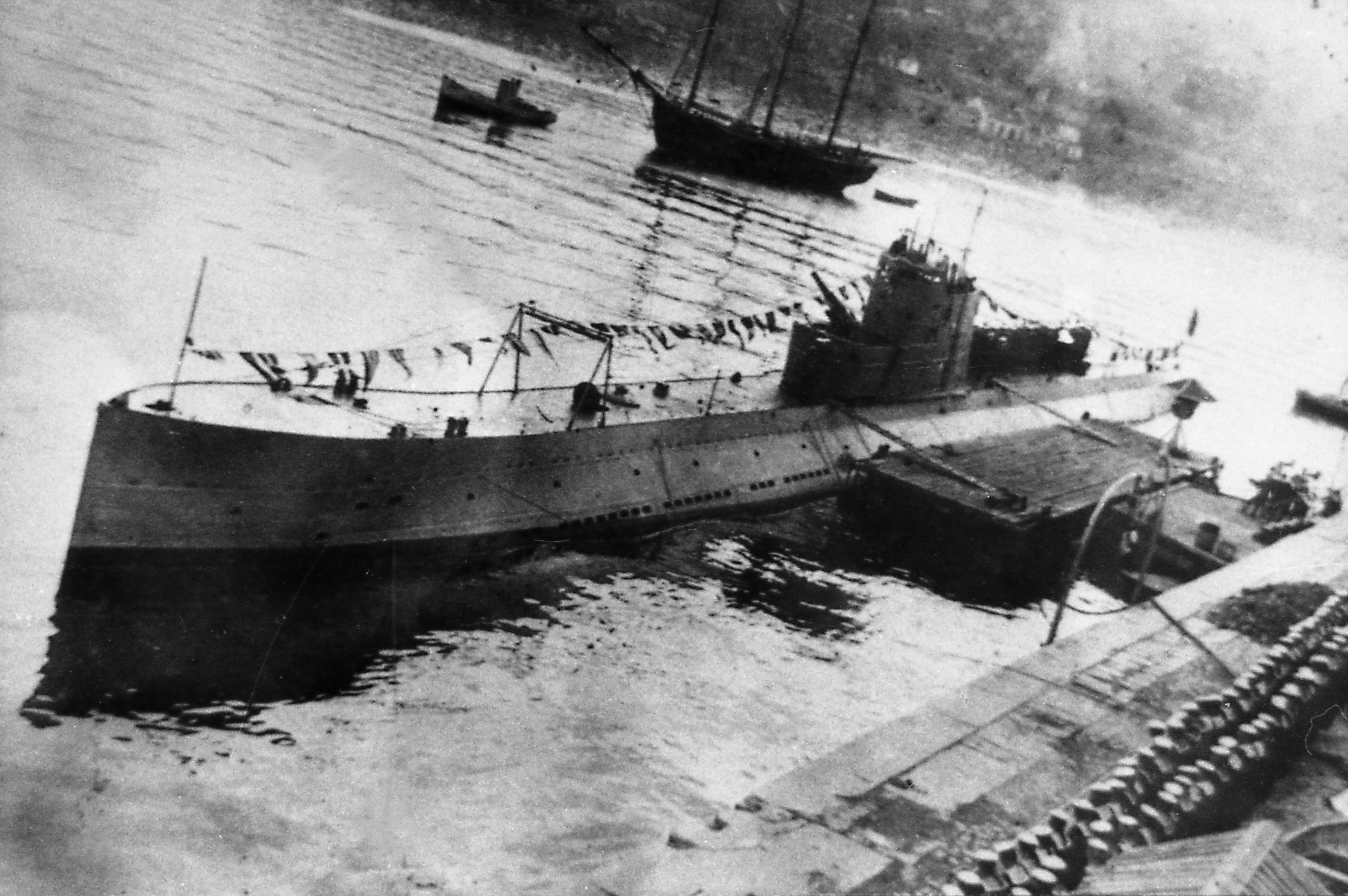
- Submarine L-4 Garibaldets

Class overview
- Preceded by: Dekabrist class
- Succeeded by: Shchuka class
- Built: 1931–1941
- In commission: 1931–1971
- Completed: 25
- Lost: 4
- Preserved: 1 (partially)

General characteristics
- Displacement: Group 1+2: 1,051 tons surfaced; 1,327 tons submerged; Group 3+4: 1,123 tons surfaced; 1,416 tons submerged
- Length: Group 1+2: 81 m (265 ft 9 in); Group 3+4: 83.3 m (273 ft 4 in)
- Beam: Group 1+2: 6.6 m (21 ft 8 in); Group 3+4: 7 m (23 ft 0 in)
- Draft: All Groups: 4.08 m (13 ft 5 in)
- Propulsion: Diesel-electric, 2 shafts; Group 1+2: 2,200 hp (1,600 kW) diesels; 1,450 hp (1,080 kW) electric motors; Group 3+4: 4,200 hp (3,100 kW) diesels; 2,400 hp (1,800 kW) electric motors
- Speed: Group 1+2: 14 knots (26 km/h) surfaced; 9 knots (17 km/h) submerged; Group 3+4: 18 knots (33 km/h) surfaced; 10 knots (19 km/h) submerged
- Complement: 53
- Armament: 1 × 100 mm gun; 1 × 45 mm gun; 6 × 21-inch (533 mm) bow torpedo tubes; 12 × torpedoes; 20 × mines; 2 stern mounted torpedo tubes added in Groups 3 and 4

The Leninets or L class were the second class of submarines to be built for the Soviet Navy. Twenty-five were built in four groups between 1931 and 1941. They were minelaying submarines and were based on the British L-class submarine, HMS L55, which was sunk during the British intervention in the Russian Civil War. Some experience from the previous Dekabrist-class submarines was also utilised. The boats were of the saddle tank type and mines were carried in two stern galleries as pioneered on the pre-war Russian submarine Krab (1912). These boats were considered successful by the Soviets. Groups 3 and 4 had more powerful engines and a higher top speed.

== Ships ==
=== Group 1 ===
Series II. (Group 1)

Six ships were built (L-1 to L-6), all launched in 1931. Three were assigned to the Baltic Fleet and three to the Black Sea Fleet, including Soviet submarine L-3.

Number	Name	Meaning	Fleet	Launched	Fate
L-1	Leninets (Ленинец)	Follower of Lenin	Baltic	28 February 1931	Sunk by German artillery October 1941, salvaged 1944, scrapped 1949
L-2	Stalinets (Сталинец)	Follower of Stalin	Baltic	21 May 1931	Sunk 14 November 1941 by mine off Keri Island
L-3	Frunzenets (Фрунзенец)	Follower of Frunze	Baltic	8 August 1931	Renamed B-3 in 1949; decommissioned 15 February 1971, conning tower preserved as a memorial
L-4	Garibaldets (Гарибальдиец)	Follower of Garibaldi	Black Sea	31 August 1931	Renamed B-34 in 1949; decommissioned 2 November 1954 and scrapped on 17 February 1956
L-5	Chartist (Чартист)	An adherent of Chartism	Black Sea	5 June 1932	Decommissioned 25 December 1955 and scrapped in 1956
L-6	Carbonari (Карбонарий)	Carbonari	Black Sea	3 November 1932	Sunk with depth charges near Sevastopol on 18 April 1944 by the German submarine chaser UJ-104

=== Group 2 ===
Series XI. (Group 2)

Six ships were built (L-7 to L-12) and launched between 1935 and 1936. All were built for the Pacific Fleet by plant 202 "Dalzavod" Vladivostok and plant 199 Komsomolsk-na-Amure.

Number	Name	Meaning	Fleet	Launched	Fate
L-7	Voroshilovets	Follower of Kliment Voroshilov	Pacific	15 May 1935	Stricken 1958 and later scrapped
L-8	Dzerzhinets	Follower of Dzerzhinsky	Pacific	10 September 1935	Decommissioned 1959, served as a training vessel until 1970; dismantled in 1973; conning tower preserved as a memorial to L-19
L-9	Kirovets	Follower of Kirov	Pacific	25 August 1935	Renamed L-19 in 1945 in honor of the sunken L-19, renamed B-19 in 1949; stricken in 1958 and later scrapped
L-10	Menzhinets	Follower of Menzhinski	Pacific	18 December 1936	Renamed B-10 in 1949, decommissioned in 1959; served as floating charging station ZAS-18 (later PZS-20), stricken in 1967 and scrapped
L-11	Sverdlovets	Follower of Sverdlov	Pacific	4 December 1936	Renamed B-11 in 1949; decommissioned and stricken in 1959 and later scrapped; conning tower preserved as a memorial to L-16
L-12	Molotovets	Follower of Molotov	Pacific	7 November 1936	Renamed B-12 in 1949, decommissioned in 1959; stricken in 1983; hull entombed in a stone pier in Magadan in 1986

=== Group 3 ===
Series XIII. (Group 3)

Seven ships were built (L-13 to L-19) and launched from 1937 to 1938. All were assigned to the Pacific Fleet. Considered a new project, the hull was based on the Srednyaya class. They carried 18 mines.

Ship	Fleet	Launched	Fate
L-13	Pacific	2 August 1936	Renamed B-13 in 1949, decommissioned 1956; stricken in 1958
L-14	Pacific	20 December 1936	Renamed B-14 in 1949, decommissioned 1956, stricken in 1984 and scrapped
L-15	Pacific	26 December 1936	Transferred to the Northern Fleet via the Panama Canal in late 1942; stricken in 1958 and scrapped
L-16	Pacific	9 July 1937	Torpedoed by Japanese submarine I-25 on 11 October 1942 near the coast of Oregon while being transferred to the Soviet Northern Fleet
L-17	Pacific	5 November 1937	Renamed B-17 in 1949, decommissioned 1959; served as training ship UTS-84 into the 2000s
L-18	Pacific	12 May 1938	Renamed B-18 in 1949, decommissioned 1958; served as training ship UTS-85 into the 2000s
L-19	Pacific	25 May 1938	Lost on or after 24 August 1945 to unknown cause; probably mined in or off the Le Pérouse Strait

=== Group 4 ===
Series XIII-38. (Group 4)

6 ships were built (L-20 to L-25) and launched from 1940 to 1941. 3 were assigned to the Baltic Fleet and 3 to the Black Sea Fleet. This group added stern torpedo tubes and new, more powerful diesel engines.

Ship	Fleet	Launched	Fate
L-20	Baltic	14 April 1940	Renamed B-20 in 1949, decommissioned 1956; sank on 10 October 1957 in Chernaya Bay during nuclear testing
L-21	Baltic	17 July 1940	Renamed B-21 in 1949, stricken 1955 and scrapped in 1958
L-22	Baltic	23 September 1939	Transferred to Northern Fleet 1941; renamed B-22 in 1949, decommissioned 1955; participated in nuclear testing in 1957–1958; stricken in 1959 and scrapped
L-23	Black Sea	29 April 1940	Missing after 1 January 1944; likely sunk 17 January 1944 off Cape Tarchakut by German sub-chaser UJ106
L-24	Black Sea	17 December 1940	Sunk between 15 and 29 December 1942 off Cape Shabla by a mine of the Romanian flanking barrage S-15, laid by the Romanian minelayers Amiral Murgescu, Regele Carol I and Dacia; wreck found in 1991
L-25	Black Sea	26 February 1941	Never finished; sunk while being towed from Tuapse to Sevastopol on 18 December 1944

== Sources ==
- Budzbon, Przemysław (1980). "Soviet Union". In Chesneau, Roger (ed.). Conway's All the World's Fighting Ships 1922–1946. Conway Maritime Press. pp. 318–346. ISBN 0-85177-146-7.
- Budzbon, Przemysław & Radziemski, Jan (2020). "The Beginnings of Soviet Naval Power". In Jordan, John (ed.). Warship 2020. Osprey. pp. 82–101. ISBN 978-1-4728-4071-4.
- Budzbon, Przemysław; Radziemski, Jan & Twardowski, Marek (2022). Warships of the Soviet Fleets 1939–1945. Vol. I: Major Combatants. Naval Institute Press. ISBN 978-1-68247-877-6.
- Polmar, Norman & Noot, Jurrien (1991). Submarines of the Russian and Soviet Navies, 1718–1990. Naval Institute Press. ISBN 0-87021-570-1.
- Rohwer, Jürgen & Monakov, Mikhail S. (2001). Stalin's Ocean-Going Fleet: Soviet Naval Strategy and Shipbuilding Programs 1935–1953. Frank Cass. ISBN 0-7146-4895-7.
- Yakubov, Vladimir & Worth, Richard (2008). Raising the Red Banner: A Pictorial History of Stalin's Fleet. Spellmount. ISBN 978-1-86227-450-1.
