= Soviet submarine Shch-307 =

1934 Shchuka-class submarine

Coordinates: 55.7261339°N 37.4978201°E

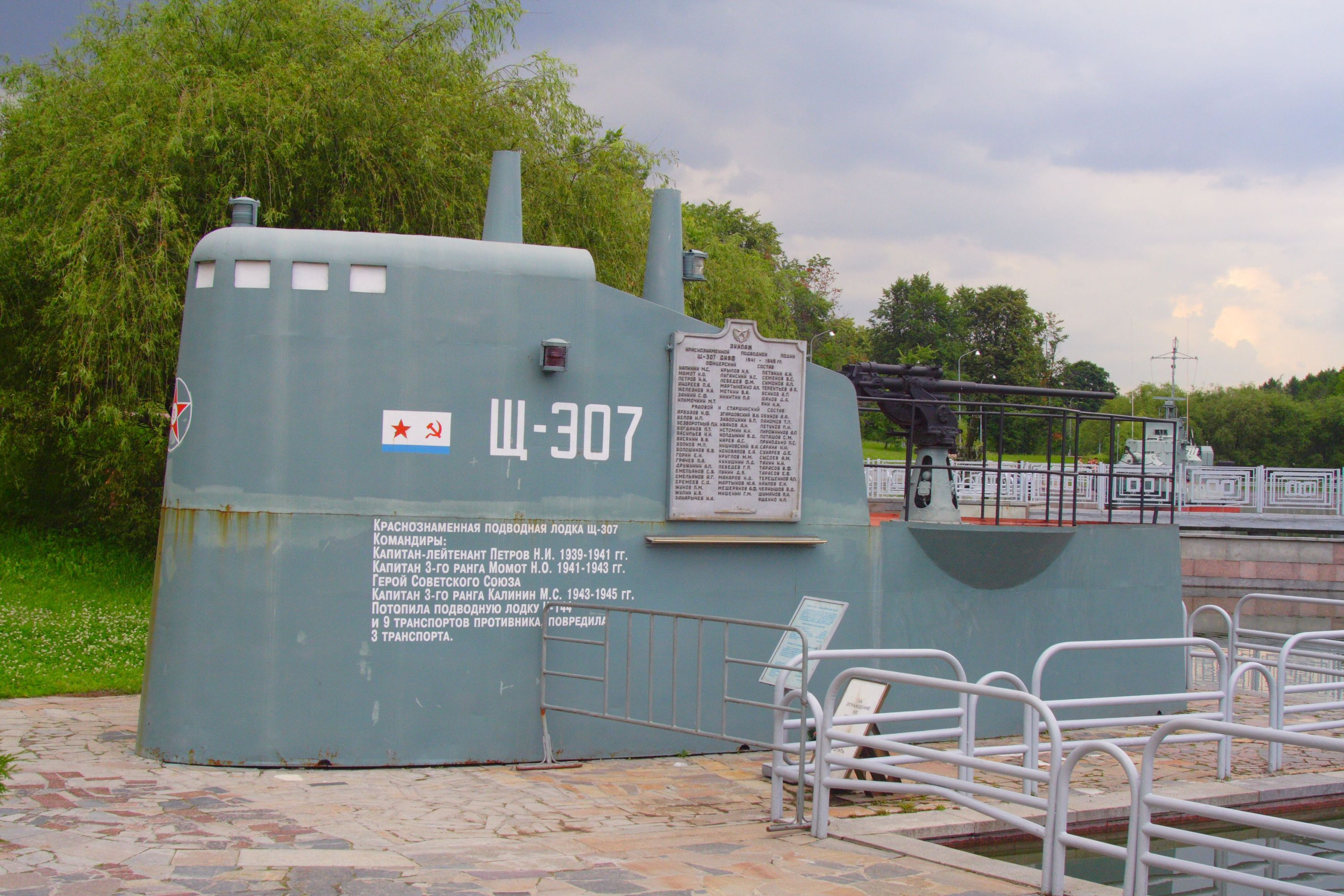
- Shch-307's conning tower

History

Soviet Union
- Name: Shch-307
- Ordered: mid-1933
- Builder: Baltic Works, Leningrad
- Laid down: 6 November 1933
- Launched: 1 August 1934
- Commissioned: 4 August 1935
- Decommissioned: 23 April 1948
- Renamed: From Treska, 15 September 1934; PZS-5, 1949
- Stricken: 8 April 1957
- Status: Scrapped after 8 April 1957, Conning tower preserved as memorial in Moscow

General characteristics
- Class & type: Series V-bis-2 Shchuka-class submarine
- Displacement: 591 t (582 long tons) (surfaced); 708 t (697 long tons) (submerged)
- Length: 58.75 m (192 ft 9 in)
- Beam: 6.20 m (20 ft 4 in)
- Draught: 4.22 m (13 ft 10 in) (mean)
- Installed power: 1,010 kW (1,370 PS) (diesel); 590 kW (800 PS) (electric)
- Propulsion: 2-shaft diesel electric; 2 diesel engines; 2 electric motors
- Speed: 13.5 knots (25.0 km/h; 15.5 mph) (surfaced); 8 knots (15 km/h; 9.2 mph) (submerged)
- Range: 5,100 nmi (9,400 km; 5,900 mi) at 8.35 knots (15.46 km/h; 9.61 mph); 104 nmi (193 km; 120 mi) at 2.74 knots (5.07 km/h; 3.15 mph) (submerged)
- Test depth: 75 m (246 ft)
- Complement: 39
- Armament: 4 × bow 533 mm (21 in) torpedo tubes; 2 × stern 533 mm (21 in) torpedo tubes; 2 × 45 mm (1.8 in) deck guns

Shch-307 (Russian: Щ-307) was a Series V-bis-2 Shchuka-class submarine built for the Soviet Navy during the 1930s with the name of Treska. Renamed Shch-307 while under construction in 1934, she was completed the following year. The boat was assigned to the Baltic Fleet and participated in the defense of the Soviet Union after the Axis powers invaded in June 1941 (Operation Barbarossa). The ship played a minor role during the evacuation of Tallinn, Estonia, in August. Shch-307 made only four war patrols during the war, but sank a German submarine in 1941. After the war, the boat was decommissioned in 1948, renamed PZS-5 and converted into a floating charging station the following year. She was stricken from the navy list in 1957 and subsequently scrapped, although her conning tower was preserved as a memorial.

== Background and description ==
The Series V-bis-2 Shchuka-class submarines were improved versions of the Series V-bis boats placed into production because Soviet shipyards were having difficulties integrating new German technology. The boats displaced 591 metric tons (582 long tons) surfaced and 708 t (697 long tons) submerged. They had an overall length of 58.75 meters (193 ft), a beam of 6.2 meters (20 ft 4 in), and a mean draft of 4.22 meters (14 ft). The boats had a diving depth of 75 m (246 ft). Their crew numbered 39 officers and crewmen.

For surface running, the Series V-bis-2 boats were powered by a pair of 38V-8 diesel engines, one per propeller shaft. The engines produced a total of 1,370 metric horsepower (1,008 kW), enough to give them a speed of 13.5 knots (25.0 km/h; 15.5 mph) due to better streamlining of the hull. When submerged each shaft was driven by a 400-metric-horsepower (294 kW) PGV8 electric motor for 8 knots (15 km/h; 9.2 mph). The boats had a surface endurance of 5,100 nautical miles (9,400 km; 5,900 mi) at 8.35 knots (15.46 km/h; 9.61 mph); and 104 nmi (193 km; 120 mi) at 2.74 knots (5.07 km/h; 3.15 mph) submerged.

The Series V-bis-2 boats were armed with six 533-millimeter (21 in) torpedo tubes. Four of these were in the bow and the others were in the stern. They carried four reloads for the bow tubes. The submarines were also equipped with a pair of 45-millimeter (2 in) 21-K deck guns fore and aft on the conning tower.

== Construction and career ==
Shch-307 was laid down by the Baltic Works in Leningrad on 6 November 1933 with the name of Treska. She was launched on 1 August 1934 and renamed Shch-307 on 15 September. The submarine was commissioned on 4 August 1935 into the Baltic Fleet. The boat was refitted in 1938–1939 and played no part in the 1939–1940 Winter War with Finland because she was conducting post-refit training. The submarine played a small role during Operation Barbarossa. During the Baltic Sea campaign, Shch-307 sank the German submarine U-144 off Dagö Island (now Hiiumaa, Estonia) on 10 August. She evacuated from Tallinn to Kronstadt on 28–30 August.

The boat penetrated the Axis mine barrage defending the exit from the Gulf of Finland in September 1942 and sank a small merchant ship in the Åland Sea during her second war patrol in October. She made her next patrol in October 1944, after Estonia had been re-occupied and the Axis minefields cleared. While patrolling in the vicinity of Vindava, Latvia, Shch-307 made six unsuccessful attacks on Axis shipping. During her next patrol in January 1945, the submarine missed a German patrol boat, but sank a small steamship.

After the war, she was disarmed on 23 April 1948 and turned into a floating charging station renamed PZS-5 in 1949. The boat was stricken on 8 April 1957 and subsequently broken up; her conning tower was preserved as a memorial in Liepāja, Latvia. When that country became independent, the conning tower was moved to Moscow in 1994.

== Claims ==
Ships sunk by Shch-307
Date	Ship	Flag	Tonnage	Notes
10 August 1941	U-144	(Nazi Germany)	314 GRT	submarine (torpedo)
26 October 1942	Betty H.	(Finland)	2,478 GRT	freighter (torpedo)
16 January 1945	Henrietta Schultze	(Nazi Germany)	1,923 GRT	freighter (torpedo)
Total:			4,715 GRT	

== Bibliography ==
- Budzbon, Przemysław; Radziemski, Jan & Twardowski, Marek (2022). Warships of the Soviet Fleets 1939–1945. Vol. I: Major Combatants. Annapolis, Maryland: Naval Institute Press. ISBN 978-1-68247-877-6.
- Polmar, Norman & Noot, Jurrien (1991). Submarines of the Russian and Soviet Navies, 1718–1990. Annapolis, Maryland: Naval Institute Press. ISBN 0-87021-570-1.
- Rohwer, Jürgen (2005). Chronology of the War at Sea 1939–1945: The Naval History of World War Two (Third Revised ed.). Annapolis, Maryland: Naval Institute Press. ISBN 1-59114-119-2.
