= MV Goya =

German military transport ship; sank 1945, killing thousands

Coordinates: 55°12′02″N 18°18′36″E

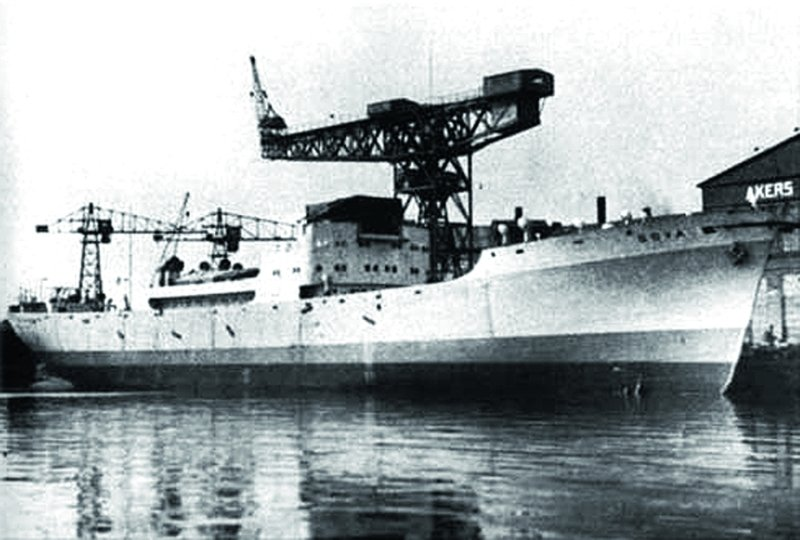
- Goya in the Akers shipyard in Oslo, Norway, 1940

History

Norway
- Name: Goya
- Owner: Johan Ludwig Mowinckel Rederi
- Builder: Akers Mekaniske Verksted, Oslo
- Yard number: 479
- Laid down: 1939
- Launched: 4 April 1940
- Fate: Seized by Germany during invasion of Norway

Germany
- Name: Goya
- Operator: Kriegsmarine
- Acquired: 1940
- Fate: Sunk, 16 April 1945

General characteristics
- Class & type: Freighter
- Tonnage: 5,230 GRT
- Length: 146 m (479 ft 0 in)
- Beam: 17.4 m (57 ft 1 in)
- Installed power: Burmeister & Wain 7,600 hp (5,700 kW)
- Speed: 18 knots (33 km/h; 21 mph)

MV Goya was a Norwegian freighter used as a troop transport by Germany and sunk with a massive loss of life near the end of World War II. Completed in 1940 for the Johan Ludwig Mowinckel Rederi company, the ship was named after Spanish artist Francisco Goya. Following Germany's invasion of Norway that year, she was seized by the Kriegsmarine and pressed into service as a troop transport. Near the end of the war, Goya took part in Operation Hannibal, the evacuation of German military and civilian personnel from remaining pockets held by the Germans along the Baltic Sea. Loaded with thousands of refugees, the ship was sunk on 16 April 1945 by the Soviet submarine L-3. Most of the crew and passengers died in the sinking. The sinking of Goya was one of the biggest single-incident maritime losses of life of the war, and one of the largest such losses in history, with just 183 survivors out of roughly 6,700 passengers and crew.

== Early service ==
Goya was originally built as a freighter by the Akers Mekaniske Verksted shipyard in Oslo, Norway, in 1940. The ship was 146 metres (479 ft 0 in) long and 17.4 metres (57 ft 1 in) wide, had a capacity of 5,230 gross register tons (GRT), and a top speed of 18 knots (33 km/h; 21 mph). Following the German occupation of Norway, the ship was seized by Germany and in 1942 refitted as an auxiliary transport vessel for German U-boats. In 1943, Goya was turned into a depot ship (tender), providing support to smaller vessels, but the following year was moved to Memel (present-day Klaipėda, Lithuania), where she was used as a target ship for torpedo practice by the 24th U-boat Flotilla.

In 1945, during Operation Hannibal, Goya was used as an evacuation ship, moving people west from the eastern and southern Baltic. Her commanding officer was Captain Plünnecke. Goya was marked as a hospital ship and carried over 1,000 hospital beds for very seriously wounded and immobile soldiers.

== Sinking ==
On 16 April 1945, Goya was sailing from Hel, around the Hel Peninsula and across the Baltic Sea to Kiel in western Germany. Besides Goya, the convoy included two smaller vessels (Kronenfels and steam tug Aegir), and two minesweeper convoy escorts, M-256 and M-328. Goya was just one of over 1,000 ships commissioned to participate in the Operation Hannibal evacuations organised by Kriegsmarine Commander-in-Chief Karl Dönitz. The ship (meant to accommodate 850 crew members), was crowded with over 7,000 evacuees, military personnel, and wounded soldiers.

Four hours after leaving the port of Hel, and while close to the southern tip of the Hel Peninsula, the convoy was attacked by Soviet bombers. During the air raids, a bomb they dropped hit Goya (causing minimal damage). After rounding the Hel Peninsula, and leaving Gdansk Bay, several miles north of Cape Rixhöft (Cape Rozewie), the convoy was sighted by Soviet minelayer submarine L-3, which also carried torpedoes. While Goya normally was faster than submarines, the convoy was slowed by engine problems on the Kronenfels, which in turn necessitated a 20-minute stop for repairs. At (exactly) four minutes before midnight (local time), L-3 Captain Vladimir Konovalov gave the order to fire a spread of four torpedoes. Two of these hit Goya; one struck amidships, the second exploded in the stern, sending an immense plume of fire and smoke into the sky. The impact of the torpedoes was so great that the ship's masts collapsed (onto refugees sleeping on the top deck). Within moments, the ship broke in two, with fire consuming its upper portions. Shortly after midnight (and less than four minutes after torpedo impact) Goya sank, drowning thousands in their beds.

=== Casualties ===
Goya, a freighter not equipped with the safety features of a passenger ship, sank to a depth of approximately 76 metres (249 ft). Given the speed of the sinking, most passengers went down with her or died of hypothermia in the cold waters of the Baltic Sea.

The exact death toll is difficult to estimate. Authors cite the total number of passengers as "over 6,000", 6,700, or 7,200, although the exact number might never be known; evacuated military personnel and civilians fleeing German enclaves in East Prussia and occupied Poland boarded ships in chaotic circumstances and often occupied all available space aboard. In any event, the death toll exceeded 6,000 and most likely reached 7,000, making the sinking one of the worst maritime disasters in history, exceeded only by the January 1945 sinking of Wilhelm Gustloff.

The exact number of survivors is also a matter of dispute; most estimates place it at approximately 182 people saved (176 soldiers and 6 civilians), of whom nine died shortly afterwards. However, other figures are also cited, notably 172 and 183, but also some as low as 98 and as high as 334.

== Discovery of wreck ==
The position of the wreck had long been known to Polish fishermen but was not identified and referred to as "Wreck No. 88" on Polish Navy maps. On 26 August 2002, the wreck was discovered by Polish technical divers Grzegorz Dominik, Michał Porada, and Marek Jagodziński, who also salvaged the ship's compass.

Exactly 58 years after the sinking of Goya, the wreck was located on 16 April 2003 by an international expedition under the direction of Ulrich Restemeyer, aided by 3D-sonar scanning. The position records of Goya's accompanying ships were found to be incorrect, probably made during a hasty escape. During the rediscovery, another, smaller, ship was seen on the surface above the wreck and initially thought to carry fishermen. But when Restemeyer's ship, Fritz Reuter, approached, the other vessel, seemingly carrying divers, left.

The wreck lies at a depth of 76 metres (249 ft) below the surface of the Baltic Sea and is in remarkably good condition, though covered with nets. The wreck is littered with human remains. Survivors have laid wreaths at the surface to show their condolences for the 6,000 people who lost their lives here. Shortly after the discovery, the wreck was officially declared a war grave by the Polish Maritime Office in Gdynia. In 2006, the decision was published in an official government gazette of the Pomeranian Voivodeship, making it illegal to dive within 500 metres of the wreck.

== See also ==
- Cap Arcona
- General von Steuben
- List by death toll of ships sunk by submarines
- Armenia
- Iosif Stalin

== Sources ==
- (in English) Yitzhak Arad (2010). In the Shadow of the Red Banner: Soviet Jews in the War Against Nazi Germany. Gefen Publishing House Ltd. ISBN 978-965-229-487-6.
- (in English) Heinz Chinnow (1 February 2004). Pomerania: 1945 Echoes of the Past. iUniverse. ISBN 978-0-595-30624-4.
- (in Polish) "Zarządzenie porządkowe Nr 9 dyrektora Urzędu Morskiego w Gdyni w sprawie zakazu nurkowania na wrakach statków-mogił wojennych" (PDF). Dziennik Urzędowy Województwa Pomorskiego. 62. Gdańsk: Wojewoda Pomorski: 4243. 2006. ISSN 1508-4779.
- (in Russian) Mark Steinberg (2005). Евреи в войнах тысячелетий [Jews in 1000 years of warfare]. Moscow-Jerusalem: Gesharim. p. 587. ISBN 5-93273-154-0.
- (in English) Spencer Tucker (30 November 2011). "Sinking of Wilhelm Gustloff, General von Steuben and Goya". World War II at Sea: An Encyclopedia. ABC-CLIO. pp. 800–801. ISBN 978-1-59884-457-3.
- (in Polish) Krzysztof Wnorowski; Marek Jagodziński (2014). "Goya". Baltic Sea Wrecks.

=== Further reading ===
- Fritz Brustat-Naval: Unternehmen Rettung, Koehlers Verlagsgesellschaft, Hamburg, 2001, ISBN 3-7822-0829-3.
- Ernst Fredmann: Sie kamen übers Meer - Die größte Rettungsaktion der Geschichte, Pfälzische Verlagsges, ISBN 3-88527-040-4.
- Heinz Schön: Ostsee '45, Motorbuch Verlag Stuttgart, 1995, ISBN 3-87943-856-0.
- Williams, David, Wartime Disasters at Sea. Near Yeovil: Patrick Stephens Limited, 1997.
