= SS Hansa (1899) =

Swedish passenger ship sunk in 1944

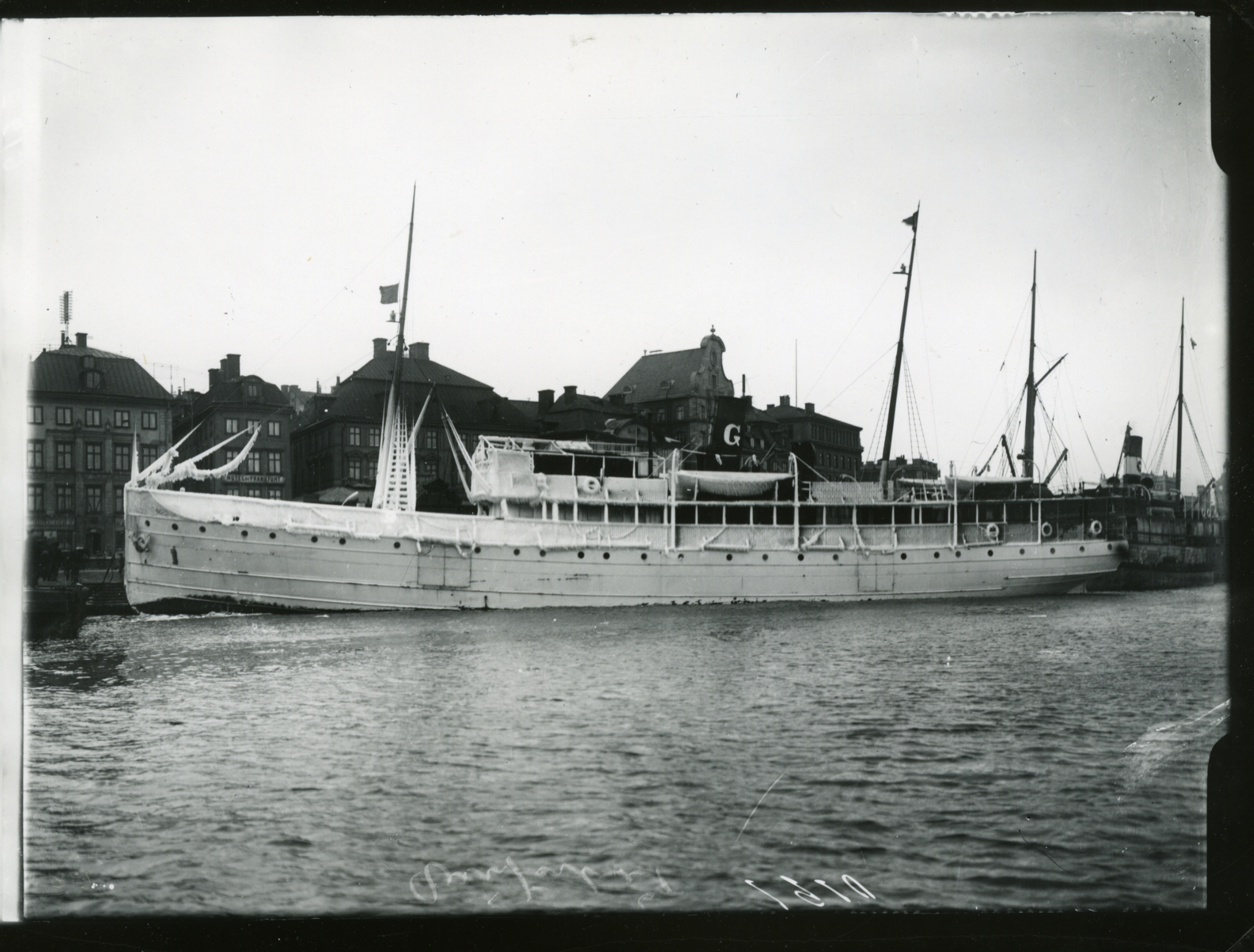

History

Sweden
- Name: SS Hansa
- Operator: Ångfartygs AB Gotland, of Visby.
- Port of registry: Sweden
- Builder: William Lindbergs Verkstads- och Varfs AB, Stockholm
- Yard number: 233
- Launched: 16 September 1899
- Fate: Sunk by Soviet submarine L21 on 24 November 1944

General characteristics
- Tonnage: 563 tons
- Length: 47.9 m
- Beam: 7.8 m
- Draught: 3.9 m
- Capacity: 63
- Crew: 23

The Hansa was a Swedish passenger ship, in use on the route between the Swedish mainland and Visby. She was torpedoed and sunk by a Soviet submarine in 1944, during World War II.

== History and sinking ==
The Hansa was a passenger steamship built in Stockholm in 1899 for Ångfartygs AB Gotland, of Visby. She was built along luxury yacht lines and had dining room for 40 guests. In addition to sailing between the Swedish mainland and Visby, she also called at a number of other ports in the Baltic such as Danzig, Tallinn and Riga during the 1930s.

At 05.57 on 24 November 1944, the Hansa was torpedoed by the Soviet submarine L21 . The Hansa was sailing between Nynäshamn and Visby, and had clearly illuminated side markings in the Swedish colours, designating it a neutral ship, and was torpedoed in Swedish territorial waters. The Soviet submarine had followed the Hansa for more than two hours before firing three topedoes. One of these caused a large explosion, and the ship sank within a few minutes; 84 people died and two survived, including Swedish Army captain Arne Mohlin. The two survivors were rescued by the Swedish minesweepers Landsort and Arholma. Investigations after the war pointed to the Soviet submarine L-21 and its captain Sergey Mogilevskiy as being responsible for the sinking. In 1992, information uncovered in Russian archives confirmed the Hansa was sunk by the L-21.

The wreck of SS Hansa lies 44 km (27 mi) north of Visby at a depth of 100 m (330 ft). It was found in 1988.

== Commemoration ==
A memorial plaque in Visby Cathedral commemorates the sinking of the ship and the loss of innocent lives. The ship's bell of the Hansa is also preserved in the cathedral.
