= Soviet submarine L-21 =

Soviet L-class submarine

History

Soviet Union
- Name: L-21
- Laid down: 15 June 1938
- Launched: 14 July 1940
- Commissioned: 31 August 1943
- Decommissioned: 29 December 1955
- Fate: Scrapped.

General characteristics
- Class & type: Leninets-class
- Displacement: 1,108 tons surfaced; 1,400 tons submerged
- Length: 85.3 m (279 ft 10 in)
- Beam: 7 m (23 ft 0 in)
- Draft: 4.05 m (13 ft 3 in)
- Propulsion: Diesel-electric; 2 × diesels; 2 × electric motors; 2 shafts
- Speed: 18 knots (33 km/h) surfaced; 9 knots (17 km/h) submerged
- Range: 10,000 nmi (19,000 km) at 10 kn (19 km/h) surfaced; 150 nmi (280 km) at 2.5 kn (4.6 km/h) submerged
- Test depth: 80
- Complement: 56
- Armament: 1 × 100 mm (3.9 in) L/68 gun; 1 × 45 mm (1.8 in) gun; 8 × 533 mm (21 in) torpedo tubes (6 bow, 2 ext aft); 18 × torpedoes; 20 × mines

Service record
- Part of: Baltic Fleet

The World War II Soviet submarine L-21 belonged to the L-class or Leninets class of minelayer submarines. She was part of the last series (Group 4) of her class, having some improvements including more torpedo tubes. The commander during the war was Sergey S. Mogilevskiy.

== Service history ==
Before completion, L-21 was sunk by German aircraft in Leningrad on 24 May 1942. L-21 was later raised, completed and commissioned, making both torpedo attacks and mine-laying. Among her victims was the Hansa, a neutral Swedish passenger ship travering from Nynäshamn to Visby. 84 innocent people were killed in the attack, which is commemorated by a memorial plaque in Visby Cathedral on Gotland, where the ship's bell is also preserved. L-21 also managed to sink a number of German warships, including two torpedo boats and a submarine.

Ships sunk by L-21
| Date | Ship | Flag | Tonnage | Notes |
|---|---|---|---|---|
| 23 November 1944 | Eichberg | (Nazi Germany) | 1,923 GRT | freighter (mine) |
| 24 November 1944 | Elie | (Nazi Germany) | 1,837 GRT | freighter (mine) |
| 24 November 1944 | Hansa | (Sweden) | 563 GRT | passenger ship (torpedo) |
| 22 December 1944 | Eberhard | (Nazi Germany) | 749 GRT | freighter (mine) (possibly) |
| 14 March 1945 | T3 | (Nazi Germany) | 839 t displacement | torpedo boat (mine) |
| 14 March 1945 | T5 | (Nazi Germany) | 839 t displacement | torpedo boat (mine) |
| 16 March 1945 | U-367 | (Nazi Germany) | 769 t displacement (surfaced) | submarine (mine) |
| 23 March 1945 | V 2022/E Colzmann | (Nazi Germany) | 581 GRT | patrol boat (torpedo) |
| 24 March 1945 | Erni | (Nazi Germany) | 105 GRT | tug (torpedo) |
| Total: | | | 8,205 GRT | |

One of her mines heavily damaged the German destroyer Z43.
