= Soviet submarine L-3 =

1931 Leninets-class submarine

Coordinates: 55.7271360°N 37.4989882°E

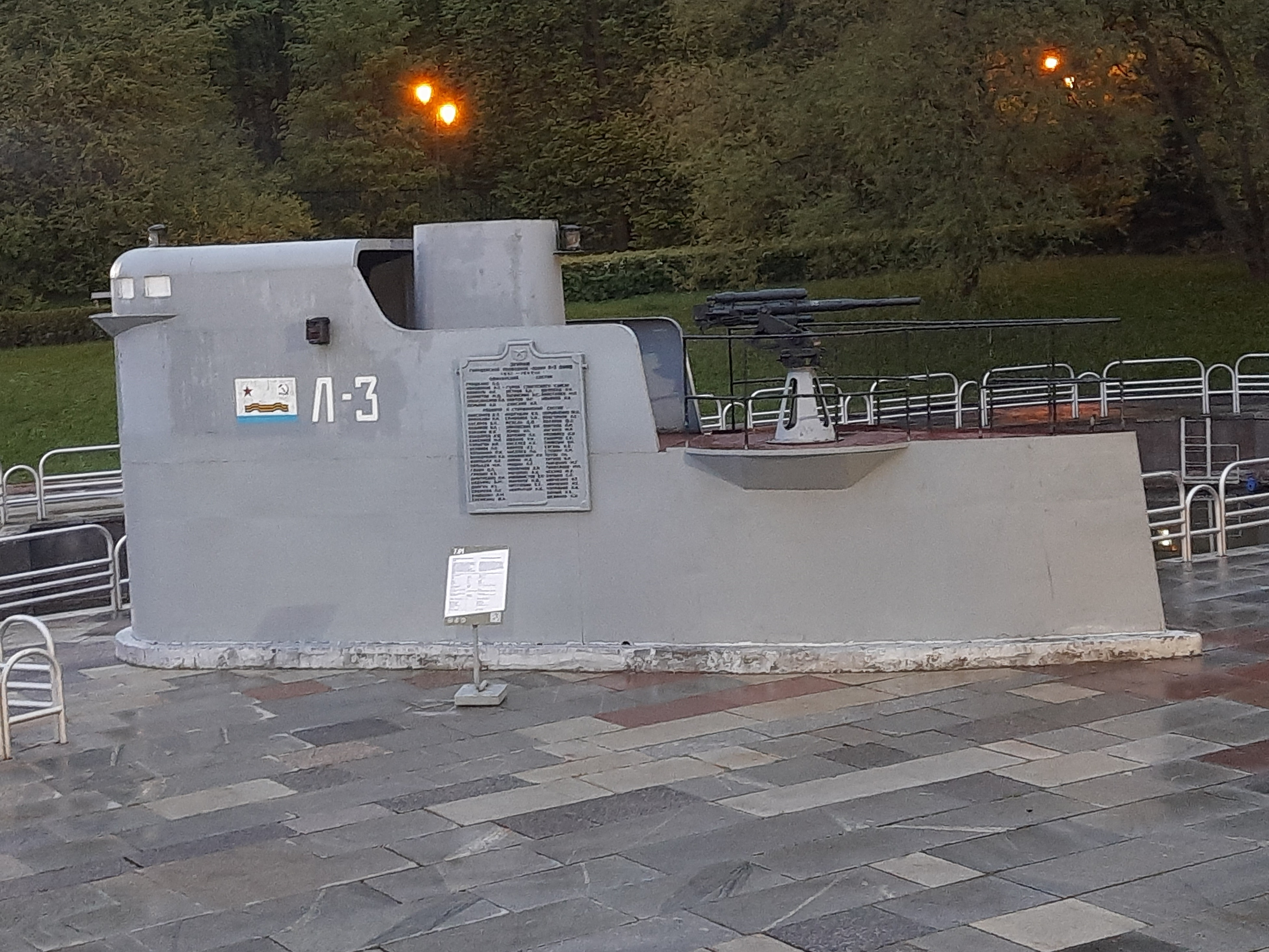
- L-3 memorial

History

USSR Ensign
- Name: L-3
- Builder: Baltic Works, Leningrad
- Launched: 8 August 1931
- Completed: 5 November 1933
- Commissioned: 9 November 1933
- Decommissioned: 15 February 1971
- Renamed: From Frunzenets (Фрунзенец), 15 September 1934; To B-3, 1949; STZh-25, 1956; UTS-26, 1956
- Stricken: 15 February 1971
- Fate: Scrapped after 15 February 1971, with conning tower preserved as a memorial

General characteristics (as built)
- Class & type: Leninets-class submarine minelayer
- Displacement: 1,051 t (1,034 long tons) (surfaced); 1,327 t (1,306 long tons) (submerged)
- Length: 79 m (259 ft 2 in) (o/a)
- Beam: 7.3 m (23 ft 11 in)
- Draft: 4.1 m (13 ft 5 in) (mean)
- Installed power: 2,200 PS (1,600 kW) (diesels); 1,300 PS (960 kW) (electric)
- Propulsion: 2 shafts; diesel-electric; 2 × diesel engines; 2 × electric motors
- Speed: 14 knots (26 km/h; 16 mph) (surfaced); 10 knots (19 km/h; 12 mph) (submerged)
- Range: 6,000 nmi (11,000 km; 6,900 mi) at 10 knots (19 km/h; 12 mph) (surfaced); 135 nmi (250 km; 155 mi) at 2.5 knots (4.6 km/h; 2.9 mph) (submerged)
- Test depth: 75 m (246 ft)
- Complement: 54
- Armament: 6 × bow 533 mm (21 in) torpedo tubes; 20 × mines; 1 × 100 mm (3.9 in) deck gun

L-3 was one of six Series II double-hulled Leninets or L-class minelayer submarines built for the Soviet Navy during the early 1930s. L-3 had initially been named Bolshevik and had been renamed Frunzovets while under construction in 1931. Commissioned in 1933 into the Baltic Fleet, she was renamed L-3 when the navy decided to use alphanumeric names for submarines in 1934.

== Design and description ==
The Soviet Navy decided in the early 1920s that it wanted both patrol and minelaying submarines, with the latter derived from the former. Construction of the minelayers was postponed until the submarine design bureaus had time to learn the lessons from building the Dekabrist-class patrol submarines and the British submarine HMS L55 which had been salvaged in 1928. The boats displaced 1,070 metric tons (1,050 long tons) surfaced and 1,140 t (1,120 long tons) submerged. They had an overall length of 79.93 meters (262 ft), a beam of 7.3 meters (23 ft 11 in), and a mean draft of 4.3 meters (14 ft). The boats had a diving depth of 75 m (246 ft). Their crew numbered 53 officers and crewmen.

For surface running, the Leninets-class boats were powered by a pair of 42-BM-6 diesel engines, one per propeller shaft. The engines produced a total of 2,200 metric horsepower (1,618 kW), enough to give them a speed of 14 knots (26 km/h; 16 mph). When submerged each shaft was driven by a PG 84 650-metric-horsepower (478 kW) electric motor for 10 knots (19 km/h; 12 mph). The boats had a surface endurance of 6,000 nautical miles (11,000 km; 6,900 mi) at 10 knots (19 km/h; 12 mph) and 135 nmi (250 km; 155 mi) at 2.5 knots (4.6 km/h; 2.9 mph) submerged. For submerged cruising the Leninets class were equipped with a pair of 30 PS (22 kW) electric motors. As completed the boats had problems with stability, excessive diving times (up to three minutes), noisy auxiliary machinery, and poor-quality batteries. These produced excessive amounts of explosive hydrogen gas which could lead to fires. By the end of 1934 the battery compartments had been rendered gas-tight and the ventilation had been improved.

They were armed with six 533-millimeter (21 in) torpedo tubes in the bow, each with one reload. A pair of horizontal tubes for a total of 20 PLT-10 mines ran inside the pressure hull to the extreme stern where they would be ejected after the tubes had been flooded. The mines could be laid down to a depth of 150 m (490 ft) while the boats cruised at a speed of 8 knots (15 km/h; 9.2 mph) and depths of 4–12 m (13–39 ft). They were also initially equipped with a 100-millimeter (3.9 in) B-2 deck gun mounted on the front of the conning tower, although this was replaced by a B-34 gun of the same size and moved to a position forward of the conning tower. At some point during the 1930s, a 45 mm (1.8 in) 21-K anti-aircraft (AA) gun was added on the rear of the conning tower.

== Construction and career ==
L-3 was laid down on 6 September 1929 by the Baltic Works in Leningrad with the name Bolshevik and was launched on 8 July 1931. She was renamed Frunzovets on 21 November and completed on 5 November 1933. The ship was commissioned into the Baltic Fleet four days later and renamed L-3 on 15 September 1934.

After the dismantling of the submarine, part of it was used as the monument in Liepāja, though the monument was relocated to Moscow in 1994.

== Claims ==
Ships sunk by L-3
| Date | Ship | Flag | Tonnage | Notes |
|---|---|---|---|---|
| 1 October 1941 | Kaija | (Latvia) | 1876 GRT | freighter (mine) |
| 19 November 1941 | Henny | (Nazi Germany) | 764 GRT | freighter (mine) |
| 22 November 1941 | Uno | (Sweden) | 430 GRT | tanker (mine-unconfirmed) |
| 26 November 1941 | Engerau | (Nazi Germany) | 1142 GRT | freighter (mine) |
| 18 August 1942 | C.F. Liljevalch | (Sweden) | 5492 GRT | freighter (torpedo) |
| 25 August 1942 | Franz Bohmke | (Nazi Germany) | 210 GRT | freighter (mine) |
| 17 November 1942 | Hindenburg | (Nazi Germany) | 7880 GRT | freighter (mine) |
| 9 December 1942 | Edith Bosselmann | (Nazi Germany) | 952 GRT | freighter (mine) |
| 5 February 1943 | Tristan | (Nazi Germany) | 1765 GRT | freighter (mine – probably) |
| 5 February 1943 | Grundsee | (Nazi Germany) | 866 GRT | freighter (mine – probably) |
| 30 March 1943 | U-416 | (Nazi Germany) | 769 GRT | submarine (mine – later recovered) |
| 20 November 1944 | T-34 | (Nazi Germany) | 1294 GRT | large torpedo boat (mine) |
| 29 January 1945 | Henry Lutgens | (Nazi Germany) | 1141 GRT | merchant (mine) |
| 23 March 1945 | M-3138 | (Nazi Germany) | 112 GRT | auxiliary minesweeper (mine) |
| 30 March 1945 | Jersbek | (Nazi Germany) | 2804 GRT | merchant (mine – possibly) |
| 17 April 1945 | Goya | (Nazi Germany) | 5230 GRT | transport ship (torpedo) |
| Total: | | | 32,730 GRT | |

== Bibliography ==
- Budzbon, Przemysław; Radziemski, Jan & Twardowski, Marek (2022). Warships of the Soviet Fleets 1939–1945. Vol. I: Major Combatants. Annapolis, Maryland: Naval Institute Press. ISBN 978-1-68247-877-6.
- Polmar, Norman & Noot, Jurrien (1991). Submarines of the Russian and Soviet Navies, 1718–1990. Annapolis, Maryland: Naval Institute Press. ISBN 0-87021-570-1.
- Rohwer, Jürgen (2005). Chronology of the War at Sea 1939–1945: The Naval History of World War Two (Third Revised ed.). Annapolis, Maryland: Naval Institute Press. ISBN 1-59114-119-2.
