= German torpedo boat T13 =

German torpedo boat

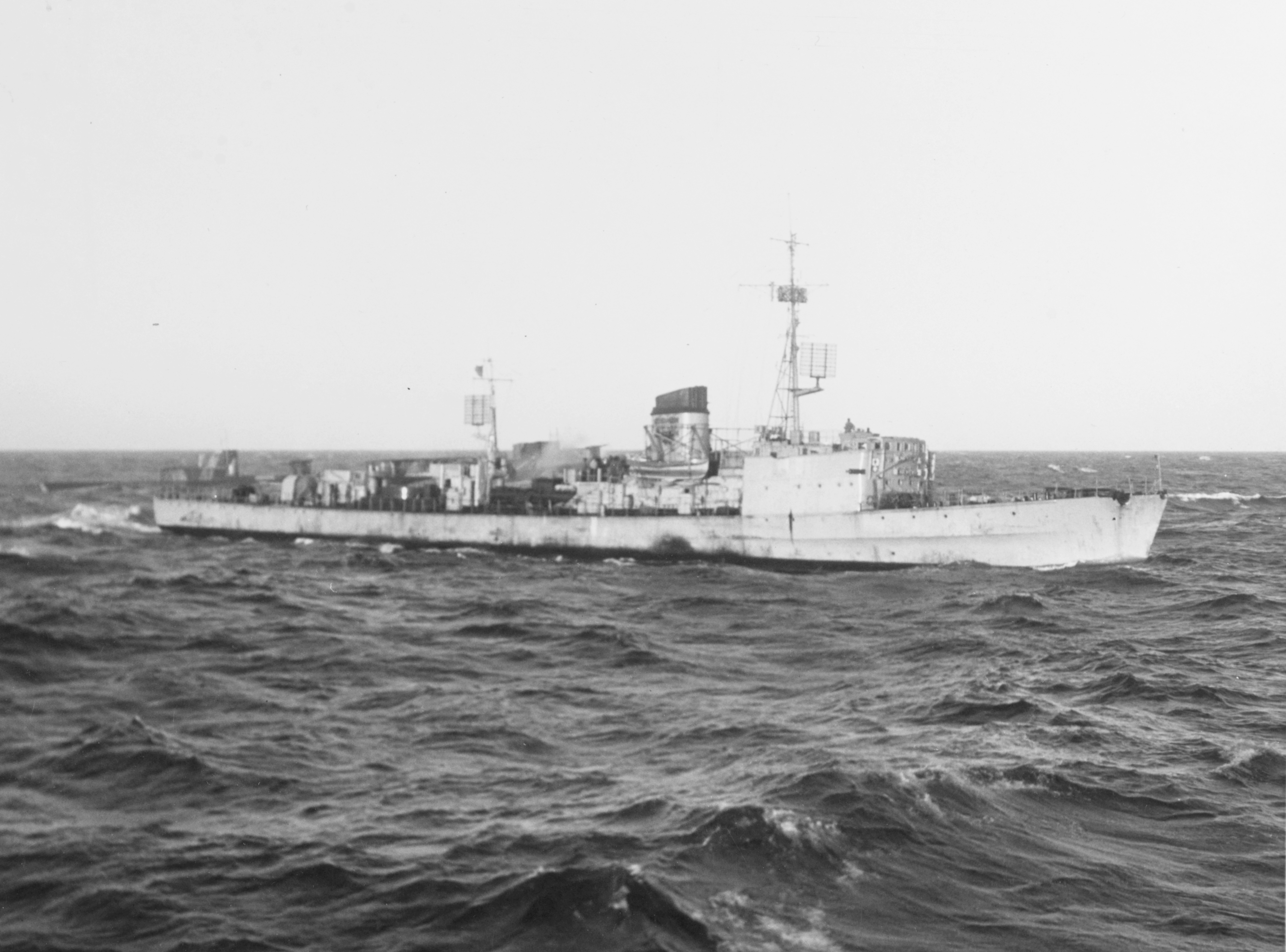
- Sister ship T21 at sea, 2 July 1946, en route to be scuttled with her load of poison gas

History

Nazi Germany
- Name: T13
- Ordered: 18 September 1937
- Builder: Schichau, Elbing, East Prussia
- Yard number: 1401
- Laid down: 26 September 1938
- Launched: 15 June 1939
- Completed: 31 May 1941
- Fate: Sunk by aircraft, 10 April 1945

General characteristics (as built)
- Class & type: Type 37 torpedo boat
- Displacement: 888 t (874 long tons) (standard); 1,139 t (1,121 long tons) (deep load)
- Length: 85.2 m (279 ft 6 in) o/a
- Beam: 8.87 m (29 ft 1 in)
- Draft: 2.8 m (9 ft 2 in)
- Installed power: 4 × water-tube boilers; 31,000 shp (23,000 kW)
- Propulsion: 2 × shafts; 2 × geared steam turbine sets
- Speed: 35 knots (65 km/h; 40 mph)
- Range: 1,600 nmi (3,000 km; 1,800 mi) at 19 knots (35 km/h; 22 mph)
- Complement: 119
- Armament: 1 × single 10.5 cm (4.1 in) gun; 1 × single 3.7 cm (1.5 in) AA gun; 2 × single 2 cm (0.8 in) AA guns; 2 × triple 533 mm (21 in) torpedo tubes; 30–60 mines

The German torpedo boat T13 was the lead ship of her class of nine torpedo boats built for the Kriegsmarine (German Navy) during the late 1930s. Completed in mid-1941, the boat was assigned convoy escort work in the Baltic Sea before she was transferred to Occupied France in early 1942. T13 helped to escort a pair of battleships and a heavy cruiser through the English Channel back to Germany in February in the Channel Dash and then returned to France in July after receiving a refit. There the boat laid minefields and escorted Axis blockade runners through the Bay of Biscay into the Atlantic Ocean. In mid-1943, she was assigned to the Torpedo School where she remained until mid-1944. T13 returned to the Baltic where she screened German ships as they bombarded Soviet positions for the rest of the year. The boat was then assigned convoy escort duties in the Skagerrak around the beginning of 1945. During one such mission in April, T13 was sunk by Royal Air Force (RAF) bombers.

== Design and description ==
The Type 37 torpedo boat was a slightly improved version of the preceding Type 35 with better range. The boats had an overall length of 85.2 meters (279 ft 6 in) and were 82 meters (269 ft 0 in) long at the waterline. The ships had a beam of 8.87 meters (29 ft 1 in), and a mean draft of 2.8 meters (9 ft 2 in) at deep load and displaced 888 metric tons (874 long tons) at standard load and 1,139 metric tons (1,121 long tons) at deep load. Their crew numbered 119 officers and sailors. Their pair of geared steam turbine sets, each driving one propeller, were designed to produce 31,000 shaft horsepower (23,000 kW) using steam from four high-pressure water-tube boilers which would propel the boats at 35 knots (65 km/h; 40 mph). They carried enough fuel oil to give them a range of 1,600 nautical miles (3,000 km; 1,800 mi) at 19 knots (35 km/h; 22 mph).

As built, the Type 37 class mounted a single 10.5 cm (4.1 in) SK C/32 (Note: In Kriegsmarine gun nomenclature, SK stands for Schiffskanone (ship's gun), C/32 stands for Constructionjahr (construction year) 1932.) gun on the stern. Anti-aircraft defense was provided by a single 3.7 cm (1.5 in) SK C/30 anti-aircraft gun superfiring over the 10.5 cm gun and a pair of 2 cm (0.8 in) C/30 guns on the bridge wings. They carried six above-water 533 mm (21 in) torpedo tubes in two triple mounts amidships and could also carry 30 mines (or 60 if the weather was good).

=== Modifications ===
Early-war modifications for the Type 37s were limited to the conversion of the foremast into a tripod mast, installation of a FuM 28 (Note: German: Funkmess-Ortung (Radio-direction finder, active ranging)) radar with fixed antennas angled 45° to each side and a 2 cm gun superfiring over the main gun. T13 received an additional 3.7 cm gun on her forecastle after November 1941. Boats participating in the Channel Dash in February 1942 were ordered to have their aft torpedo tube mount replaced by a quadruple 2 cm gun mount, but it is not certain if this was actually done. During a refit in May–July, T13 had her single mount in the superfiring position replaced by the quadruple mount. In September 1944 installation of a single 3.7 cm gun was ordered in all surviving boats, either the Flak M42 or the Flak M43, in lieu of the aft torpedo tubes, but it is also uncertain if this was done. Some boats did receive additional 4 cm (1.6 in) Bofors guns. Some received twin 2 cm gun mounts that replaced the single mounts in the bridge wings. Before the end of the war, all of the surviving boats probably had at least two 3.7 cm or 4 cm guns aboard.

== Construction and career ==
T13 was ordered on 18 September 1937 from Schichau, laid down at their Elbing, East Prussia, shipyard on 26 September 1938 as yard number 1401, launched on 15 June 1939 and completed on 31 May 1941; construction was delayed by shortages of skilled labor and of raw materials. She was working up until October when she was transferred to the Baltic for convoy escort duties. The boat was transferred to France in early 1942. On the morning of 12 February, the 2nd Torpedo Boat Flotilla (with T2, T4, T5, T11, T12) and the 3rd Torpedo Boat Flotilla (with T13 and her sisters T15, T16, and T17) rendezvoused with the battleships Gneisenau and Scharnhorst and the heavy cruiser Prinz Eugen to escort them through the Channel to Germany in the Channel Dash. T13 then began a refit in Rotterdam, the Netherlands, that lasted until July when she returned to France. On 20–22 July the 3rd Torpedo Boat Flotilla, consisting of T13, her sister T14 and the torpedo boats T4 and T10 laid two minefields in the Channel. The flotilla, now with T13, T10 and T14, laid another minefield in the Channel on 1–2 August. The same three boats escorted the replenishment oiler Ermland as she made an unsuccessful attempt to break out into the Atlantic through the Bay of Biscay on 8–11 August. In September–October, T13 and her sisters T14, T18, T19 and T21 were some of the escorts for German blockade runners sailing from ports in the Bay of Biscay en route to Japan.

The boat returned to Germany in March 1943 and began a refit in Hamburg that lasted until August when she was transferred to the Torpedo School. T13 returned to active duty in mid-1944 and returned to the Baltic. Rejoining the 3rd Torpedo Boat Flotilla, T13 and her sisters T18 and T20 sortied into the Archipelago Sea as a show of force on 12–13 September after the Prime Minister of Finland, Antti Hackzell, broke off diplomatic relations with Germany and ordered German forces to leave Finland on 2 September. On the return voyage, T18 was sunk by Soviet aircraft. On 23 September, T13, T17, T19 and T20 escorted the last evacuation convoy from Tallinn, Estonia, to Germany. During 10–12 and 13–15 October, the 3rd Torpedo Boat Flotilla, with T13, T16, T20 and T21, screened the heavy cruisers Lützow and Prinz Eugen as they bombarded advancing Soviet troops near Memel. T13, T19 and T21 escorted Lützow as she bombarded Soviet positions at Memel and Sworbe, on the Estonian island of Saaremaa, on 23–24 October. Screened by the 2nd and 3rd Torpedo Boat Flotillas (T13, T5, T9, T12, T16, T19 and T21) Prinz Eugen and the heavy cruiser Admiral Scheer shelled Soviet positions during the evacuation of Sworbe, between 20 and 24 November. Afterwards, the 3rd Flotilla was transferred to the Skagerrak for convoy escort duties. On the night of 9/10 April 1945, T13 and the escort ship F7 were escorting the transport ship SS Hansa I when RAF Handley Page Halifax heavy bombers attacked the small convoy off Læsø Island and sank T13 and the transport in the early morning of 10 April.
