= German torpedo boat T19 =

German torpedo boat

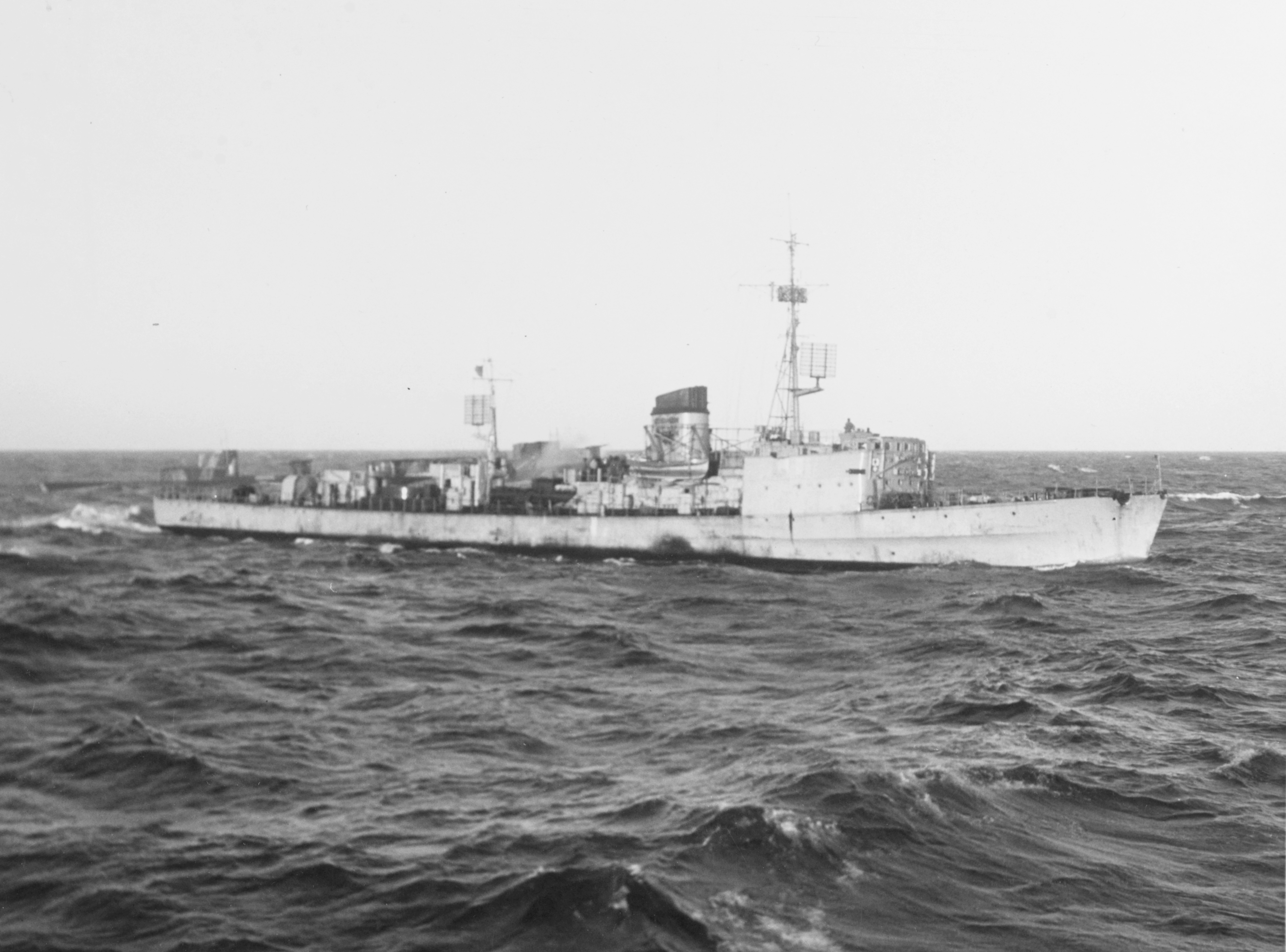
- Sister ship T21 at sea, 2 July 1946, en route to be scuttled with her load of poison gas

History

Nazi Germany
- Name: T19
- Ordered: 5 October 1938
- Builder: Schichau, Elbing, East Prussia
- Yard number: 1446
- Laid down: 23 September 1939
- Launched: 20 July 1940
- Completed: 18 December 1941
- Fate: Transferred to the United States as war reparations, sold to Denmark, 1947, but never used, scrapped, 1950–1951

General characteristics (as built)
- Class & type: Type 37 torpedo boat
- Displacement: 888 t (874 long tons) (standard); 1,139 t (1,121 long tons) (deep load)
- Length: 85.2 m (279 ft 6 in) o/a
- Beam: 8.87 m (29 ft 1 in)
- Draft: 2.8 m (9 ft 2 in)
- Installed power: 4 × water-tube boilers; 31,000 shp (23,000 kW)
- Propulsion: 2 × shafts; 2 × geared steam turbine sets
- Speed: 35 knots (65 km/h; 40 mph)
- Range: 1,600 nmi (3,000 km; 1,800 mi) at 19 knots (35 km/h; 22 mph)
- Complement: 119
- Armament: 1 × single 10.5 cm (4.1 in) gun; 1 × single 3.7 cm (1.5 in) AA gun; 2 × single 2 cm (0.8 in) AA guns; 2 × triple 533 mm (21 in) torpedo tubes; 30–60 mines

The German torpedo boat T19 was one of nine Type 37 torpedo boats built for the Kriegsmarine (German Navy) during World War II. Completed in late 1941, she served as a training ship in the Torpedo School until mid-1942 when she was transferred to France. There she laid minefields in the English Channel and escorted Axis blockade runners and U-boats through the Bay of Biscay into the Atlantic Ocean. T19 returned to Germany in late 1943 and became a training ship again for the Torpedo School. She returned to active duty a year later and supported German forces operating in the Baltic Sea. The boat was then assigned escort duties in the Skagerrak around the beginning of 1945, which included covering minelaying missions. In May T19 helped to evacuate troops and refugees from advancing Soviet forces. The boat was allocated to the United States after the war, but she was sold to Denmark a few years later. Unused by the Royal Danish Navy, T4 was scrapped in 1951–1952.

== Design and description ==
The Type 37 torpedo boat was a slightly improved version of the preceding Type 35 with better range. The boats had an overall length of 85.2 meters (279 ft 6 in) and were 82 meters (269 ft) long at the waterline. The ships had a beam of 8.87 meters (29 ft 1 in), and a mean draft of 2.8 meters (9 ft 2 in) at deep load. They displaced 888 metric tons (874 long tons) at standard load and 1,139 metric tons (1,121 long tons) at deep load. Their crew numbered 119 officers and sailors. Their pair of geared steam turbine sets, each driving one propeller shaft, were designed to produce 31,000 shaft horsepower (23,000 kW) using steam from four high-pressure water-tube boilers which was intended to give the boats a maximum speed of 35 knots (65 km/h; 40 mph). They carried enough fuel oil to give them a range of 1,600 nautical miles (3,000 km; 1,800 mi) at 19 knots (35 km/h; 22 mph).

As built, the Type 37s mounted a single 10.5 cm (4.1 in) SK C/32 gun on the stern. Anti-aircraft defense was provided by a single 3.7 cm (1.5 in) SK C/30 anti-aircraft gun superfiring over the 10.5 cm gun and a pair of 2 cm (0.8 in) C/30 guns on the bridge wings. They carried six above-water 533 mm (21 in) torpedo tubes in two triple mounts amidships and could also carry 30 mines (or 60 if the weather was good).

=== Modifications ===
Early-war modifications were limited to the conversion of the foremast into a tripod mast, installation of a FuM 28 (Note: German: Funkmess-Ortung (Radio-direction finder, active ranging)) radar with fixed antennas angled 45° to each side. Quadruple 2 cm gun mounts began slowly replacing the 3.7 cm gun beginning in May 1942 as the ships were refitted. In September, installation of a single 3.7 cm gun was ordered, either the Flak M42 or the Flak M43, in lieu of the aft torpedo tubes, in all surviving boats, but it is also uncertain if this was done. Another 3.7 cm mount had been fitted on the searchlight platform amidships in T19 by 1944. By war's end, T19 was armed with a mix of three 40-millimeter (1.6 in) Bofors or 3.7 cm guns, two quadruple 2 cm mounts and a pair of 2 cm twin-gun mounts on the bridge wings.

== Construction and career ==
T19 was ordered on 5 October 1938 from Schichau, laid down at their Elbing, East Prussia, shipyard on 23 September 1939 as yard number 1446, launched on 20 July 1940 and commissioned on 18 December 1941; construction was delayed by shortages of skilled labor and of raw materials. She was either working up or assigned to the Torpedo School until September 1942 when she was transferred to France. T19 and her sisters T13, T14, T18 and T21 were some of the escorts for Axis blockade runners sailing from ports in the Bay of Biscay en route to Japan in September and October. On 13–14 October T19, T14 and the torpedo boats T4 and T10, made an unsuccessful attempt to escort the commerce raider Komet through the Channel. They were intercepted by a British force of five escort destroyers and eight motor torpedo boats (MTBs) that sank the raider and severely damaged T10. T19, on the other hand, was struck by stray machine-gun fire from Komet that wounded several men. In June–August 1943, T19 returned to the Bay of Biscay to help escort U-boats through the Bay. Now assigned to the 5th Torpedo Boat Flotilla, the boat helped to lay two minefields in the English Channel on 3–5 September together with the torpedo boats Kondor, Möwe, T25 and T27. The flotilla (Greif, Kondor, T19, T26 and T27) laid another minefield in the Channel on 29–30 September.

T19 returned to Germany in October and began a refit in Bremen that lasted until February 1944 when she was reassigned to the Torpedo School. The boat returned to active duty in June and escorted the last evacuation convoy from Tallinn, Estonia, to Germany on 23 September with T13, T17, and T20. T19, T13 and T21 screened the heavy cruiser Lützow as she bombarded Soviet positions at Memel and Sworbe, on the Estonian island of Saaremaa, on 23–24 October. Escorted by the 2nd and 3rd Torpedo Boat Flotillas (T19, T5, T9, T12, T13, T16 and T21) the heavy cruisers Prinz Eugen and Admiral Scheer shelled Soviet positions during the evacuation of Sworbe, between 20 and 24 November. Afterwards, the 3rd Flotilla, including T19, was transferred to the Skagerrak for convoy escort duties. The boat helped to escort a minelaying mission in the North Sea on 13–14 January 1945. Together with T17 and T20, T19 escorted another minelaying mission there on 17–18 March. On 5 May, she helped to ferry 45,000 refugees from East Prussia to Copenhagen, Denmark, and returned to transport 20,000 more to Glücksburg, Germany, on the 9th. The boat was allocated to the Americans when the Allies divided the surviving ships of the Kriegsmarine amongst themselves in late 1945. The United States Navy had no interest in her and she was sold to Denmark in 1947 for $5,000. Intended for use as a flotilla leader for MTBs, she was never commissioned and was scrapped in 1950–1951.
