= German torpedo boat T18 =

German World War II torpedo boat

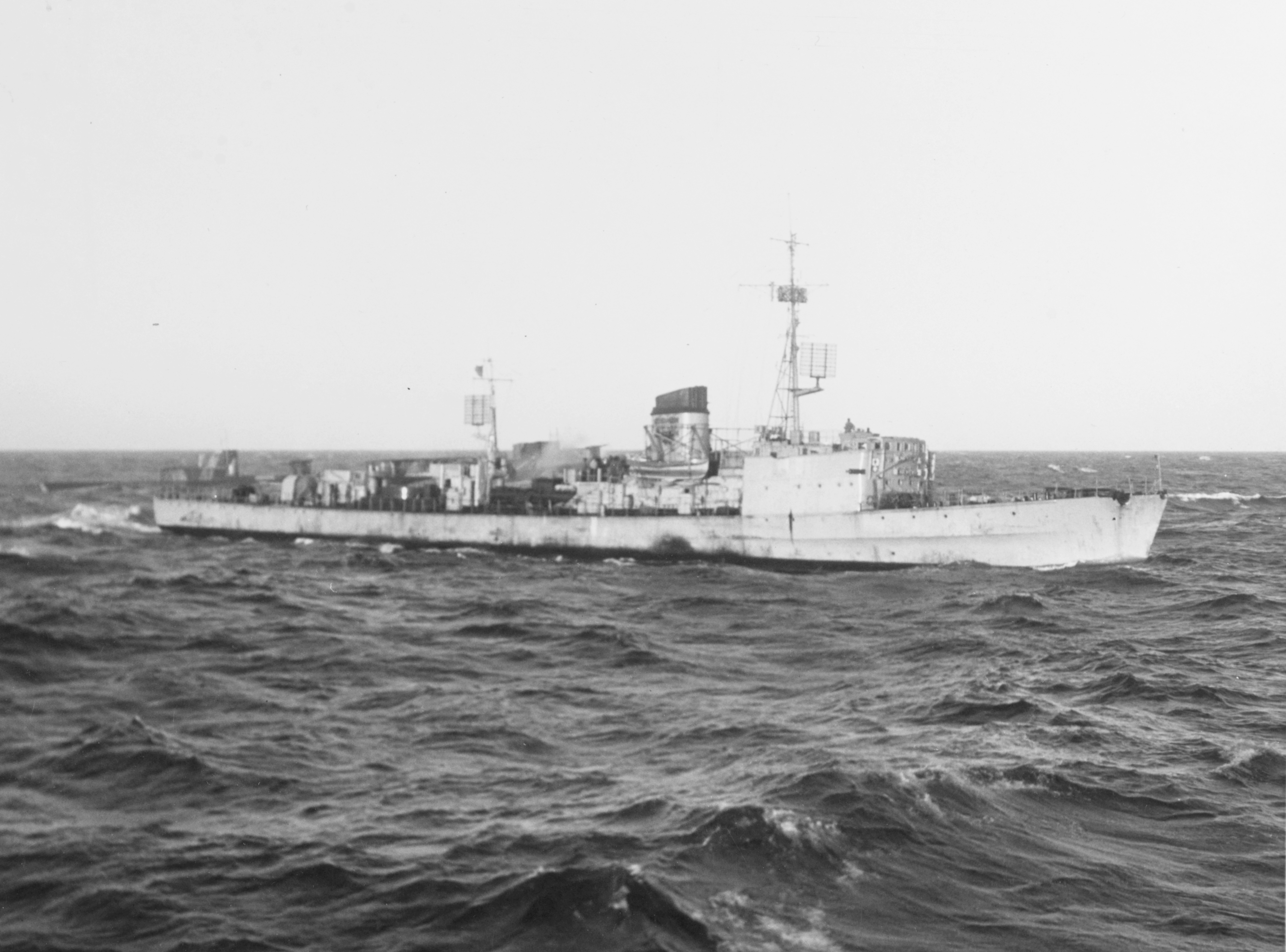
- Sister ship T21 at sea, 2 July 1946, en route to be scuttled with her load of poison gas

History

Nazi Germany
- Name: T18
- Ordered: 18 September 1937
- Builder: Schichau, Elbing, East Prussia
- Yard number: 1406
- Laid down: 27 July 1939
- Launched: 1 June 1940
- Completed: 22 November 1941
- Fate: Sunk by aircraft, 13 September 1944

General characteristics (as built)
- Class & type: Type 37 torpedo boat
- Displacement: 888 t (874 long tons) (standard); 1,139 t (1,121 long tons) (deep load)
- Length: 85.2 m (279 ft 6 in) o/a
- Beam: 8.82 m (28 ft 11 in)
- Draft: 2.8 m (9 ft 2 in)
- Installed power: 4 × water-tube boilers; 31,000 shp (23,000 kW)
- Propulsion: 2 × shafts; 2 × geared steam turbine sets
- Speed: 35 knots (65 km/h; 40 mph)
- Range: 1,600 nmi (3,000 km; 1,800 mi) at 19 knots (35 km/h; 22 mph)
- Complement: 119
- Armament: 1 × single 10.5 cm (4.1 in) gun; 1 × single 3.7 cm (1.5 in) AA gun; 2 × single 2 cm (0.8 in) AA guns; 2 × triple 533 mm (21 in) torpedo tubes; 30–60 mines

The German torpedo boat T18 was one of nine Type 37 torpedo boats built for the Kriegsmarine (German Navy) during World War II. Completed in mid-1941, she was later assigned to the Baltic Sea for convoy escort duties. The boat briefly became a training ship in 1942 before she was transferred to France where she laid minefields and escorted Axis blockade runners and U-boats through the Bay of Biscay into the Atlantic Ocean. T18 returned to Germany in mid-1943 and became a training ship again for the Torpedo School and U-boat Flotillas. The boat returned to active duty in mid-1944 and assigned to the Baltic where she was sunk by Soviet aircraft in September.

== Design and description ==
The Type 37 torpedo boat was a slightly improved version of the preceding Type 35 with better range. The boats had an overall length of 85.2 meters (279 ft 6 in) and were 82 meters (269 ft) long at the waterline. The ships had a beam of 8.87 meters (29 ft 1 in), and a mean draft of 2.8 meters (9 ft 2 in) at deep load. They displaced 888 metric tons (874 long tons) at standard load and 1,139 metric tons (1,121 long tons) at deep load. Their crew numbered 119 officers and sailors. Their pair of geared steam turbine sets, each driving one propeller shaft, were designed to produce 31,000 shaft horsepower (23,000 kW) using steam from four high-pressure water-tube boilers which was intended to give the boats a maximum speed of 35 knots (65 km/h; 40 mph). They carried enough fuel oil to give them a range of 1,600 nautical miles (3,000 km; 1,800 mi) at 19 knots (35 km/h; 22 mph).

As built, the Type 37s mounted a single 10.5 cm (4.1 in) SK C/32 gun on the stern. Anti-aircraft defense was provided by a single 3.7 cm (1.5 in) SK C/30 anti-aircraft (AA) gun superfiring over the 10.5 cm gun and a pair of 2 cm (0.8 in) C/30 guns on the bridge wings. They carried six above-water 533 mm (21 in) torpedo tubes in two triple mounts amidships and could also carry 30 mines (or 60 if the weather was good).

=== Modifications ===
Early-war modifications were limited to the conversion of the foremast into a tripod mast, installation of a FuM 28 (Note: German: Funkmess-Ortung (Radio-direction finder, active ranging)) radar with fixed antennas angled 45° to each side. T18 received an additional 3.7 cm AA gun on her forecastle after November 1941. Quadruple 2 cm gun mounts began slowly replacing the 3.7 cm gun beginning in May 1942 as the ships were refitted. By 1944, another quadruple mount had been fitted on the searchlight platform amidships in T18 and she received a 4 cm (1.6 in) Bofors AA gun before her loss in September. It is uncertain if the boat received twin 2 cm gun mounts that replaced the single mounts in the bridge wings before then.

== Construction and career ==
T18 was ordered on 18 September 1937 from Schichau, laid down at their Elbing, East Prussia, shipyard on 27 July 1939 as yard number 1406, launched on 1 June 1940 and commissioned on 22 November 1941; construction was delayed by shortages of skilled labor and of raw materials. After working up, the boat began convoy escort duties in the Baltic. She was assigned to the Torpedo School as a training ship from May to September 1942 and was then transferred to France. There she joined her sisters T13, T14, T19 and T21 as escorts for German blockade runners sailing from ports in the Bay of Biscay en route to Japan. Although escorted by T18 and the torpedo boats Falke, T2, T12 and T23, the Italian blockade runner Himalaya failed in her attempt to break out through the Bay of Biscay to the Far East when she was spotted by British aircraft in late March 1943. On 5–8 May, the 2nd Torpedo Boat Flotilla with T18 and the torpedo boats T2, T5 and T22 laid three minefields in the Channel. The following month the boats returned to the Bay of Biscay to help escort U-boats through the Bay. T18, T2 and T5 arrived back in Germany on 1 July and the former was briefly reassigned to the Torpedo School before she became a training ship for U-boat flotillas in September–November. T18 was refitted at Schichau from December 1943 to May 1944 was then assigned to support German operations in the Baltic. Reassigned to the 3rd Torpedo Boat Flotilla, T18 and her sisters T13 and T20 sortied into the Archipelago Sea as a show of force on 12–13 September after the Prime Minister of Finland, Antti Hackzell, broke off diplomatic relations with Germany and ordered German forces to leave Finland on 2 September. On the return voyage, T18 was sunk by Soviet aircraft.
