= German torpedo boat T14 =

German torpedo boat

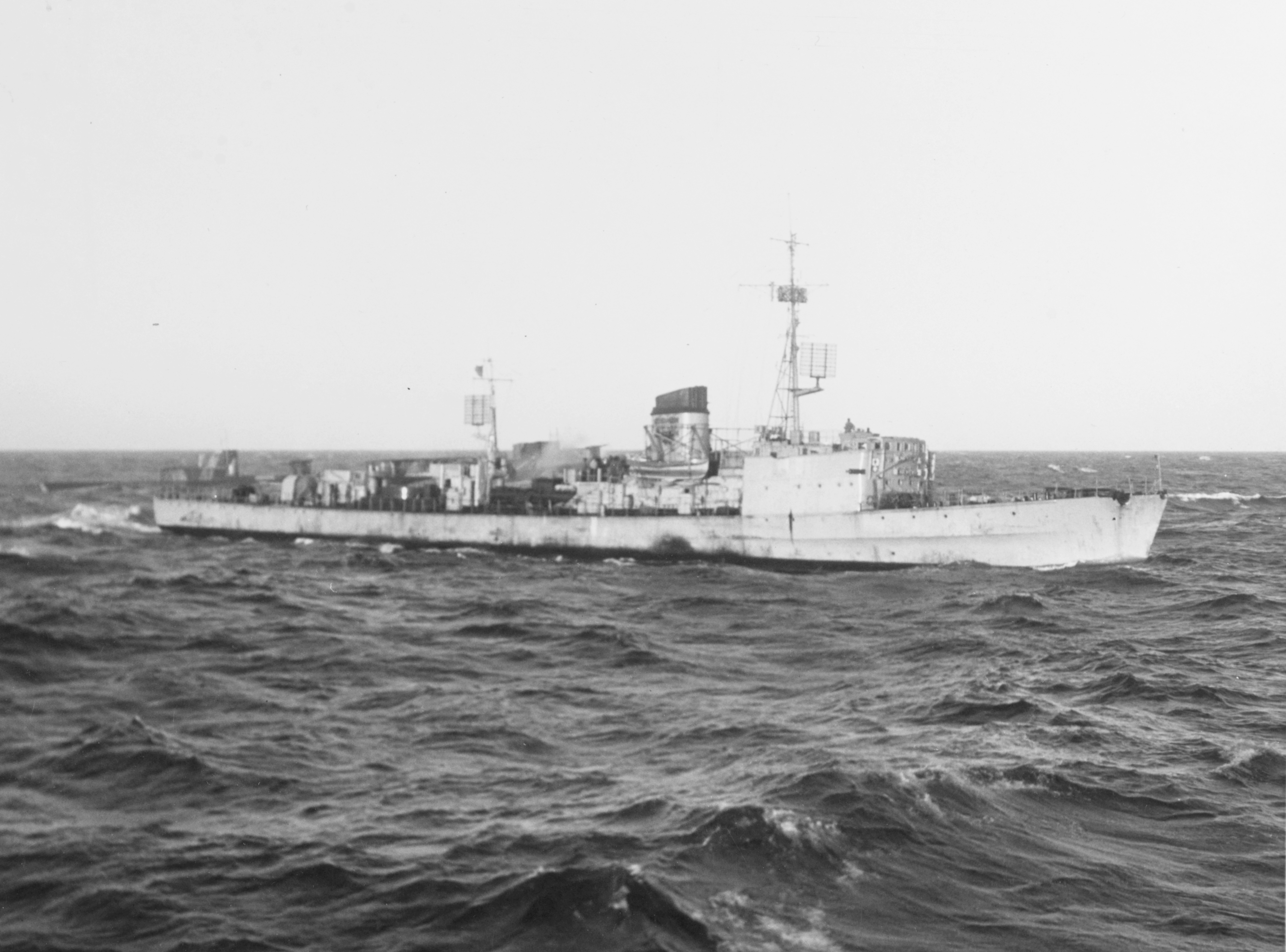
- Sister ship T21 at sea, 2 July 1946, en route to be scuttled with her load of poison gas

History

Nazi Germany
- Name: T14
- Ordered: 18 September 1937
- Builder: Schichau, Elbing, East Prussia
- Yard number: 1402
- Laid down: 5 November 1938
- Launched: 20 July 1939
- Completed: 14 June 1941
- Fate: Scrapped, 1951

General characteristics (as built)
- Class & type: Type 37 torpedo boat
- Displacement: 888 t (874 long tons) (standard); 1,139 t (1,121 long tons) (deep load)
- Length: 85.2 m (279 ft 6 in) o/a
- Beam: 8.87 m (29 ft 1 in)
- Draft: 2.8 m (9 ft 2 in)
- Installed power: 4 × water-tube boilers; 31,000 shp (23,000 kW)
- Propulsion: 2 × shafts; 2 × geared steam turbine sets
- Speed: 35 knots (65 km/h; 40 mph)
- Range: 1,600 nmi (3,000 km; 1,800 mi) at 19 knots (35 km/h; 22 mph)
- Complement: 119
- Armament: 1 × single 10.5 cm (4.1 in) gun; 1 × single 3.7 cm (1.5 in) AA gun; 2 × single 2 cm (0.8 in) AA guns; 2 × triple 533 mm (21 in) torpedo tubes; 30–60 mines

The German torpedo boat T14 was one of nine Type 37 torpedo boats built for the Kriegsmarine (German Navy) during World War II. Completed in mid-1941, she helped escort several commerce raiders passing through the English Channel in 1941 and 1942 in addition to blockade runners through the Bay of Biscay into the Atlantic. The boat remained in France until November 1943, during which time she laid several minefields, and was then assigned to the Torpedo School before beginning a lengthy refit in 1944. T14 was assigned to convoy escort duties in the Skagerrak around the beginning of 1945 and survived the war. The boat was allocated to the United States after the war, but she was transferred to France in 1947 and renamed Dompaire. Unused by the French Navy, the boat was stricken from the Navy List in 1951 and subsequently scrapped.

== Design and description ==
The Type 37 torpedo boat was a slightly improved version of the preceding Type 35 with better range. The boats had an overall length of 85.2 meters (279 ft 6 in) and were 82 meters (269 ft 0 in) long at the waterline. The ships had a beam of 8.87 meters (29 ft 1 in), a mean draft of 2.8 meters (9 ft 2 in) at deep load and displaced 888 metric tons (874 long tons) at standard load and 1,139 metric tons (1,121 long tons) at deep load. Their crew numbered 119 officers and sailors. Their pair of geared steam turbine sets, each driving one propeller, were designed to produce 31,000 shaft horsepower (23,000 kW) using steam from four high-pressure water-tube boilers which would propel the boats at 35 knots (65 km/h; 40 mph). They carried enough fuel oil to give them a range of 1,600 nautical miles (3,000 km; 1,800 mi) at 19 knots (35 km/h; 22 mph).

As built, the Type 37 class mounted a single 10.5 cm (4.1 in) SK C/32 gun on the stern. Anti-aircraft defense was provided by a single 3.7 cm (1.5 in) SK C/30 anti-aircraft gun superfiring over the 10.5 cm gun and a pair of 2 cm (0.8 in) C/30 guns on the bridge wings. They carried six above-water 533 mm (21 in) torpedo tubes in two triple mounts and could also carry 30 mines (or 60 if the weather was good).

=== Modifications ===
Early-war modifications of the Type 37s were limited to the conversion of the foremast into a tripod mast, installation of a FuM 28 (Note: German: Funkmess-Ortung (Radio-direction finder, active ranging)) radar with fixed antennas angled 45° to each side and a 2 cm gun superfiring over the main gun. Boats participating in the Channel Dash in February 1942 were ordered to have their aft torpedo tube mount replaced by a quadruple 2 cm gun mount, but it is not certain if this was actually done. T14 had this mount installed in the superfiring position in June during a refit. In September 1944, installation of a single 3.7 cm gun was ordered in all surviving boats, either the Flak M42 or the Flak M43, in lieu of the aft torpedo tubes, but it is also uncertain if this was done. Some received twin 2 cm gun mounts that replaced the single mounts in the bridge wings. By the end of the war, T14 had lost her aft torpedo tubes and was equipped with one 3.7 cm gun on her forecastle, another amidships and a quadruple 2 cm mount and four twin 2 cm mounts. The boat was also equipped with twenty-one 8.6-centimeter (3.4 in) RAG anti-aircraft rocket launchers.

== Construction and career ==
T14 was ordered on 18 September 1937 from Schichau, laid down at their Elbing, East Prussia, shipyard on 5 November 1938 as yard number 1402, launched on 20 July 1939 and commissioned on 14 June 1941; construction was delayed by shortages of skilled labor and of raw materials. Working up until December, she was briefly transferred to the west. On 3 December T14 and the torpedo boats T4 and T7 rendezvoused with the commerce raider Thor and the torpedo boats T2 and T12 in the Schillig Roads. Later that day, they began to escort Thor through the English Channel. Delayed by heavy fog, the ships did not reach Brest, France, until the 15th, while Thor continued onwards into the Atlantic. T14 returned to Germany and had a brief refit in April–May 1942 before going back to France. On 20–22 July the 3rd Torpedo Boat Flotilla, consisting of T14, her sister T13, T4 and T10, laid two minefields in the Channel. The flotilla, now with T14, T10 and T13, laid another minefield in the Channel on 1–2 August. The same three boats escorted the replenishment oiler Ermland as she made an unsuccessful attempt to breakout into the Atlantic through the Bay of Biscay on 8–11 August. In September–October, T14, T13, and their sisters T18, T19 and T21, were some of the escorts for German blockade runners sailing from ports in the Bay of Biscay en route to Japan. The flotilla, now consisting of T14, her sister T19, and T4 and T10, made an unsuccessful attempt to escort the commerce raider Komet through the Channel on 13–14 October. They were intercepted by a British force of five escort destroyers and eight motor torpedo boats that sank the raider and severely damaged T10. T14, on the other hand, was struck by stray machine-gun fire from Komet that killed the flotilla commander and wounded several men.

In November 1943, the boat returned to Germany and was briefly assigned to the Torpedo School before she began a lengthy refit in February 1944 that lasted until 2 November. T14 was assigned to the 3rd Torpedo Boat Flotilla by the end of the year even though she still working up. Around that time the flotilla was assigned to escort convoys through the Skagerrak. The boat was allocated to the Americans when the Allies divided the surviving ships of the Kriegsmarine amongst themselves in late 1945. The United States Navy had no interest in her and she was transferred to France in September 1947. T14 was renamed Dompaire when she arrived at Cherbourg on 24 October. She was immediately placed in reserve until she was stricken on 8 October 1951 and subsequently scrapped.
