= German torpedo boat T16 =

German torpedo boat

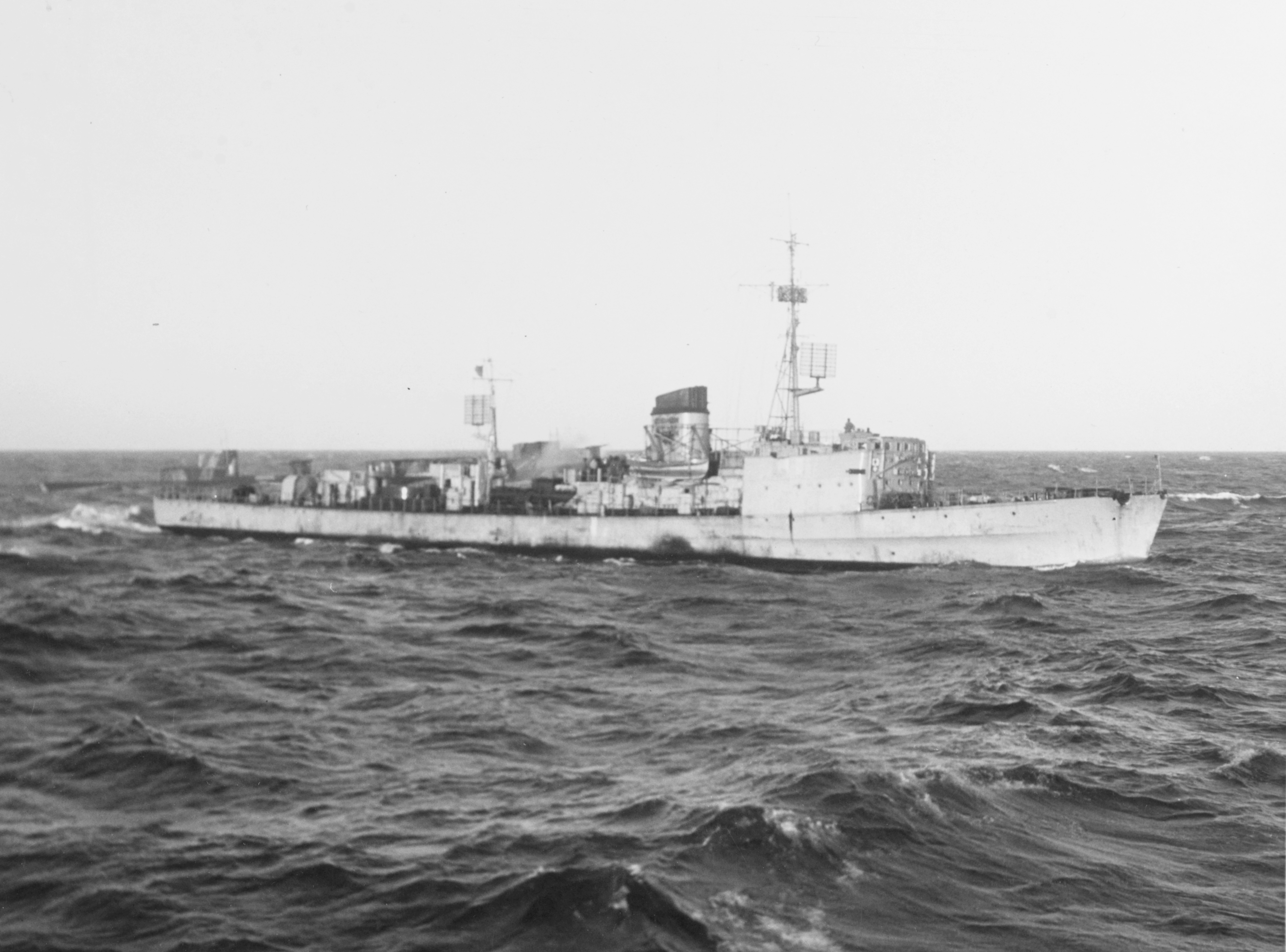
- Sister ship T21 at sea, 2 July 1946, en route to be scuttled with her load of poison gas

History

Nazi Germany
- Name: T16
- Ordered: 18 September 1937
- Builder: Schichau, Elbing, East Prussia
- Yard number: 1404
- Completed: 24 July 1941
- Fate: Crippled by bombs, 3 April 1945, scrapped, September 1946

General characteristics (as built)
- Class & type: Type 37 torpedo boat
- Displacement: 888 t (874 long tons) (standard); 1,139 t (1,121 long tons) (deep load)
- Length: 85.2 m (279 ft 6 in) o/a
- Beam: 8.87 m (29 ft 1 in)
- Draft: 2.8 m (9 ft 2 in)
- Installed power: 4 × water-tube boilers; 31,000 shp (23,000 kW)
- Propulsion: 2 × shafts; 2 × geared steam turbine sets
- Speed: 35 knots (65 km/h; 40 mph)
- Range: 1,600 nmi (3,000 km; 1,800 mi) at 19 knots (35 km/h; 22 mph)
- Complement: 119
- Armament: 1 × single 10.5 cm (4.1 in) gun; 1 × single 3.7 cm (1.5 in) AA gun; 2 × single 2 cm (0.8 in) AA guns; 2 × triple 533 mm (21 in) torpedo tubes; 30–60 mines

The German torpedo boat T16 was one of nine Type 37 torpedo boats built for the Kriegsmarine (German Navy) during World War II. Completed in mid-1941, the ship arrived in France in January 1942. She helped to escort a pair of battleships and a heavy cruiser through the English Channel back to Germany in February in the Channel Dash and then was ordered to Norway for escort work. T16 returned to Germany in May to begin a lengthy refit and briefly returned to Norway in May 1943 before going back to Germany. She was assigned to a U-boat Flotilla as a training ship in September. The ship was damaged by a mine in February 1944 and completed her repairs in August. T16 was then assigned to the Baltic Sea where she screened German ships as they bombarded Soviet positions for the rest of the year. The torpedo boat was assigned convoy escort duties in the Skagerrak around the beginning of 1945. During one such mission in April, T16 was badly damaged by British bombers and was deemed a constructive total loss. The ship was scrapped in Denmark beginning in September 1946.

== Design and description ==
The Type 37 torpedo boat was a slightly improved version of the preceding Type 35 with better range. The boats had an overall length of 85.2 meters (279 ft 6 in) and were 82 meters (269 ft 0 in) long at the waterline. The ships had a beam of 8.87 meters (29 ft 1 in), and a mean draft of 2.8 meters (9 ft 2 in) at deep load and displaced 888 metric tons (874 long tons) at standard load and 1,139 metric tons (1,121 long tons) at deep load. Their crew numbered 119 officers and sailors. Their pair of geared steam turbine sets, each driving one propeller, were designed to produce 31,000 shaft horsepower (23,000 kW) using steam from four high-pressure water-tube boilers which would propel the boats at 35 knots (65 km/h; 40 mph). They carried enough fuel oil to give them a range of 1,600 nautical miles (3,000 km; 1,800 mi) at 19 knots (35 km/h; 22 mph).

As built, the Type 37 class mounted a single 10.5 cm (4.1 in) SK C/32 gun on the stern. Anti-aircraft defense was provided by a single 3.7 cm (1.5 in) SK C/30 anti-aircraft gun superfiring over the 10.5 cm gun and a pair of 2 cm (0.8 in) C/30 guns on the bridge wings. They carried six above-water 533 mm (21.0 in) torpedo tubes in two triple mounts and could also carry 30 mines (or 60 if the weather was good).

=== Modifications ===
Early-war modifications for the Type 37s were limited to the conversion of the foremast into a tripod mast, installation of a FuM 28 (Note: German: Funkmess-Ortung (Radio-direction finder, active ranging)) radar with fixed antennas angled 45° to each side and a 2 cm gun superfiring over the main gun. Boats participating in the Channel Dash in February 1942 were ordered to have their aft torpedo tube mount replaced by a quadruple 2 cm gun mount and a 3.7 cm gun added at the bow, but it is not certain if this was actually done. Quadruple mounts began slowly replacing the 3.7 cm gun beginning in May as the ships were refitted and that gun may have been repositioned to the bow. By 1944, another quadruple mount had been fitted on the searchlight platform amidships. In September, installation of a single 3.7 cm gun was ordered, either the Flak M42 or the Flak M43, in lieu of the aft torpedo tubes, in all surviving boats, but it is also uncertain if this was done. Some boats did receive additional 4 cm (1.6 in) Bofors guns. They all received twin 2 cm gun mounts that replaced the single mounts in the bridge wings. Before the end of the war, all of the surviving boats probably had at least two 3.7 cm or 4 cm guns aboard.

== Construction and career ==
T16 was ordered on 18 September 1937 from Schichau, laid down at their Elbing, East Prussia, shipyard as yard number 1404, and commissioned on 24 July 1941; construction was delayed by shortages of skilled labor and of raw materials. Working up until January 1942, she was then deployed to France. On the morning of 12 February, the 2nd Torpedo Boat Flotilla (with T2, T4, T5, T11, T12 and the 3rd Torpedo Boat Flotilla (with T16 and her sisters T13, T15, and T17) rendezvoused with the battleships Gneisenau and Scharnhorst and the heavy cruiser Prinz Eugen to escort them through the English Channel to Germany in the Channel Dash. The following month, T16, T15, and T17 were transferred to Norway where they formed part of the escort of the heavy cruiser Admiral Hipper to Trondheim on 19–21 March. In May T16 returned to Germany to begin a refit in Kiel that lasted until September. On 1–3 October, the boat conducted exercises in the Baltic Sea with Scharnhorst, the light cruisers Leipzig and Nürnberg, the destroyers Z25, Z31 and Z37, her sisters T17, T20, T21 and the torpedo boats T22, Falke and Kondor. On 7 March 1943, T16, T20, T21 and the torpedo boats Greif and Jaguar, joined the escorts for Scharnhorst in the Skagerrak, although bad weather forced them to put into Bergen, Norway.

T16 then returned to Germany for a machinery overhaul at Kiel and was either training or in a dockyard until September. That month she was assigned as a training ship to the 23rd U-boat Flotilla in the Baltic. On 21 February 1944, the boat struck a mine off Memel (modern Klaipėda, Lithuania) and was under repair at the Oderwerke shipyard in Stettin (modern Szczecin, Poland) until August. During 10–12 and 13–15 October, the 3rd Torpedo Boat Flotilla, with T16, T13, T20 and T21, screened the heavy cruisers Lützow and Prinz Eugen as they bombarded advancing Soviet troops near Memel. Covered by the 2nd and 3rd Torpedo Boat Flotillas (T16, T5, T9, T12, T13, T19 and T21), Prinz Eugen and the heavy cruiser Admiral Scheer shelled Soviet positions during the evacuation of Sworbe, on the Estonian island of Saaremaa, between 20 and 24 November. Afterwards, the 3rd Flotilla was transferred to the Skagerrak for convoy escort duties. On 3 April 1945, T16 was badly damaged by Royal Air Force Handley Page Halifax heavy bombers and put into Frederikshavn, Denmark, for repairs, but she was judged too badly damaged to be worth to repairing. The boat was towed to Aarhus, Denmark, and broken up beginning in September 1946.
