= German torpedo boat T17 =

German torpedo boat

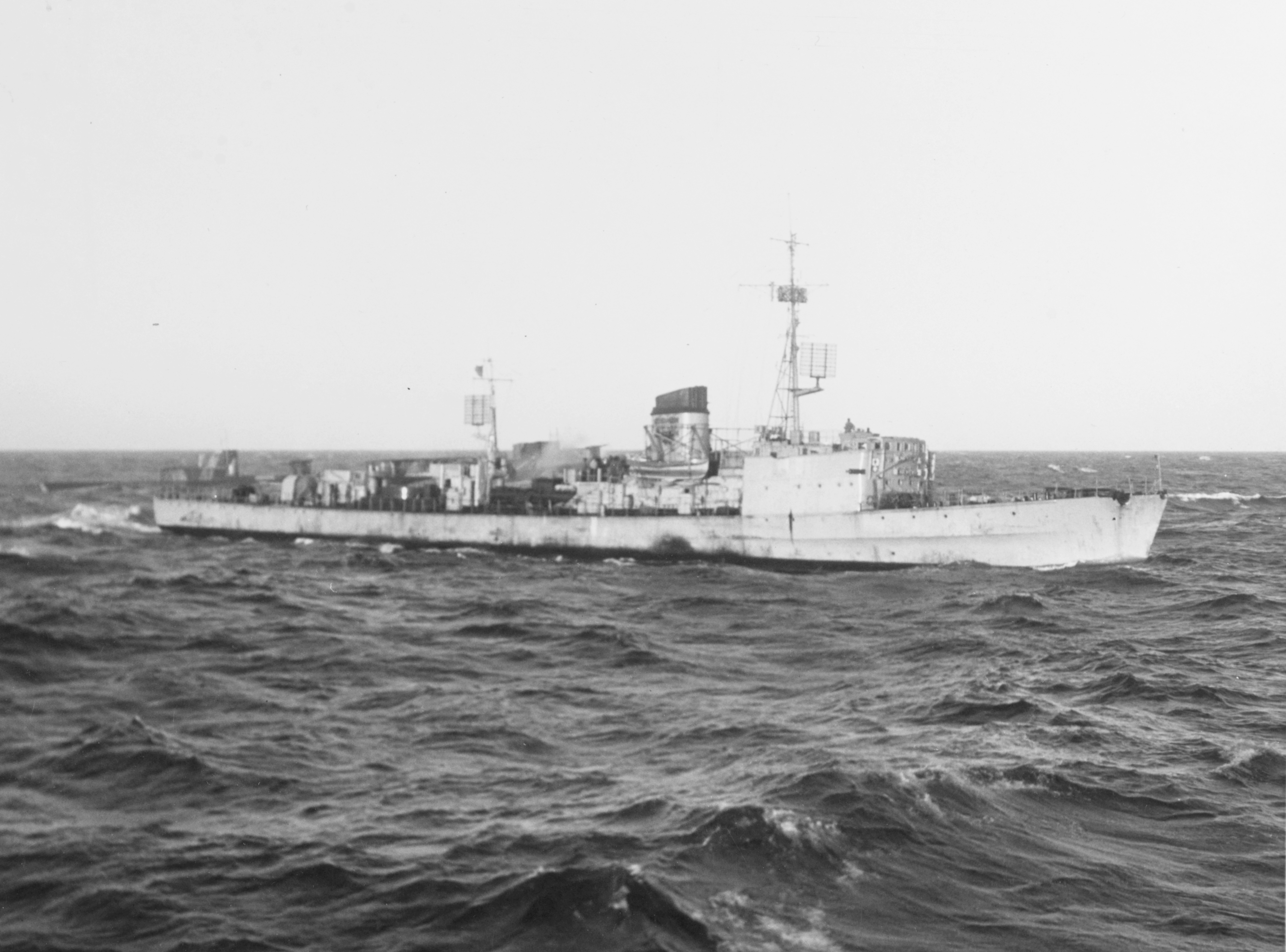
- Sister ship T21 at sea, 2 July 1946.

History

Nazi Germany
- Name: T17
- Ordered: 18 September 1937
- Builder: Schichau, Elbing, East Prussia
- Yard number: 1405
- Completed: 28 August 1941
- Fate: Transferred to the Soviet Union as war reparations, late 1945

Soviet Union
- Name: T17
- Acquired: 15 January 1946
- Renamed: Poryvisty, 13 February 1946; UTS-6, 7 September 1949
- Reclassified: Target control ship, 25 June 1949
- Stricken: 30 December 1959
- Fate: Scrapped after 30 December 1959

General characteristics (as built)
- Class & type: Type 37 torpedo boat
- Displacement: 888 t (874 long tons) (standard); 1,139 t (1,121 long tons) (deep load)
- Length: 85.2 m (279 ft 6 in) o/a
- Beam: 8.87 m (29 ft 1 in)
- Draft: 2.8 m (9 ft 2 in)
- Installed power: 4 × water-tube boilers; 31,000 shp (23,000 kW)
- Propulsion: 2 × shafts; 2 × geared steam turbine sets
- Speed: 35 knots (65 km/h; 40 mph)
- Range: 1,600 nmi (3,000 km; 1,800 mi) at 19 knots (35 km/h; 22 mph)
- Complement: 119
- Armament: 1 × single 10.5 cm (4.1 in) gun; 1 × single 3.7 cm (1.5 in) AA gun; 2 × single 2 cm (0.8 in) AA guns; 2 × triple 533 mm (21 in) torpedo tubes; 30–60 mines

The German torpedo boat T17 was one of nine Type 37 torpedo boats built for the Kriegsmarine (German Navy) during World War II. Completed in mid-1941, the ship arrived in France in December. She helped to escort a pair of battleships and a heavy cruiser through the English Channel back to Germany in February 1942 in the Channel Dash and then was ordered to Norway for escort work. The ship returned to Germany in March for a refit before redeploying back to France. T17 began another refit in Germany in early 1943 and was then assigned as a training ship for U-boat flotillas.

She returned to active duty in August 1944 and supported German forces operating in the Baltic Sea. The boat was then assigned escort duties in the Skaggerak around the beginning of 1945, which included covering minelaying missions. In May T17 helped to evacuate troops and refugees from advancing Soviet forces. The boat was allocated to the Soviet Union after the war and was renamed Poryvisty. She was assigned to the Baltic Fleet and was converted into a target control ship in 1949. Stricken from the Navy List a decade later, she was subsequently scrapped.

== Design and description ==
The Type 37 torpedo boat was a slightly improved version of the preceding Type 35 with better range. The boats had an overall length of 85.2 meters (279 ft 6 in) and were 82 meters (269 ft 0 in) long at the waterline. The ships had a beam of 8.87 meters (29 ft 1 in), and a mean draft of 2.8 meters (9 ft 2 in) at deep load and displaced 888 metric tons (874 long tons) at standard load and 1,139 metric tons (1,121 long tons) at deep load. Their crew numbered 119 officers and sailors. Their pair of geared steam turbine sets, each driving one propeller, were designed to produce 31,000 shaft horsepower (23,000 kW) using steam from four high-pressure water-tube boilers which would propel the boats at 35 knots (65 km/h; 40 mph). They carried enough fuel oil to give them a range of 1,600 nautical miles (3,000 km; 1,800 mi) at 19 knots (35 km/h; 22 mph).

As built, the Type 37 class mounted a single 10.5 cm (4.1 in) SK C/32 gun on the stern. Anti-aircraft defense was provided by a single 3.7 cm (1.5 in) SK C/30 anti-aircraft gun superfiring over the 10.5 cm gun and a pair of 2 cm (0.8 in) C/30 guns on the bridge wings. They carried six above-water 533 mm (21 in) torpedo tubes in two triple mounts and could also carry 30 mines (or 60 if the weather was good).

=== Modifications ===
Early-war modifications to the Type 37s were limited to the conversion of the foremast into a tripod mast, installation of a FuM 28 (Note: German: Funkmess-Ortung (Radio-direction finder, active ranging)) radar with fixed antennas angled 45° to each side. Boats participating in the Channel Dash in February 1942 were ordered to have their aft torpedo tube mount replaced by a quadruple 2 cm gun mount and a 3.7 cm gun added at the bow, but it is not certain if this was actually done. Quadruple mounts began slowly replacing the 3.7 cm gun beginning in May as the ships were refitted and that gun may have been repositioned to the bow. By 1944, another quadruple mount had been fitted on the searchlight platform amidships. In September, installation of a single 3.7 cm gun was ordered in all surviving boats, either the Flak M42 or the Flak M43, in lieu of the aft torpedo tubes, but it is also uncertain if this was done. Some all received twin 2 cm gun mounts that replaced the single mounts in the bridge wings. T17 had two 3.7 cm, a dozen 2 cm guns and all six torpedo tubes at war's end.

== Construction and career ==
T17 was ordered on 18 September 1937 from Schichau, laid down at their Elbing, East Prussia, shipyard as yard number 1405, launched and commissioned on 28 August 1941; construction was delayed by shortages of skilled labor and of raw materials. She was working up until October when she was transferred to the Baltic for convoy escort duties. The boat was transferred to France in early 1942. On the morning of 12 February, the 2nd Torpedo Boat Flotilla (with T2, T4, T5, T11, T12) and the 3rd Torpedo Boat Flotilla (with T17 and her sisters T13, T15, and T16) rendezvoused with the battleships Gneisenau and Scharnhorst and the heavy cruiser Prinz Eugen to escort them through the Channel to Germany in the Channel Dash. The following month, T17, T15, and T16 were transferred to Norway where they formed part of the escort of the heavy cruiser Admiral Hipper to Trondheim on 19–21 March. Later that month T17 returned to Germany to begin a refit in Kiel that lasted until September. On 1–3 October, the boat conducted exercises in the Baltic with Scharnhorst, the light cruisers Leipzig and Nürnberg, the destroyers Z25, Z31 and Z37, her sisters T16, T20, T21 and the torpedo boats T22, Falke and Kondor.

T17 returned to France later that month and then began a refit in March 1943 in Kiel that lasted until July. Two months later, she was assigned to U-boat flotillas in the Baltic as a training ship. In February 1944, the boat was transferred to the Torpedo School and began a machinery overhaul at the Oderwerke shipyard in Stettin in June. T17 was reassigned to active duty in August and escorted the last evacuation convoy from Tallinn, Estonia, to Germany on 23 September with T13, T19 and T20. T17 was transferred to the Skaggerak for escort duties around the beginning of 1945. On 16 and 17 February, she was assigned to the escort force for two cancelled minelaying operations in the North Sea. Together with T19 and T20, T17 escorted a minelaying mission in the North Sea on 17–18 March. The boat accidentally sank the German submarine U-235 with depth charges on 14 April. On 5 May, she helped to ferry 45,000 refugees from East Prussia to Copenhagen, Denmark, and returned to transport 20,000 more to Glücksburg, Germany, on the 9th.

The boat was allocated to the Soviets when the Allies divided the surviving ships of the Kriegsmarine amongst themselves in late 1945, and was included on the Soviet Navy vessel list on 5 November, assigned to the Baltic Fleet. She was handed over to a Soviet crew in Germany on 15 January 1946, who raised the naval jack of the Soviet Navy aboard her two days later. She was renamed Poryvisty on 13 February before joining the North Baltic Fleet two days later. The boat was withdrawn from combat duty on 25 June 1949 and reclassified as a target control ship, before being renamed UTS-6 on 7 September. The ship was struck on 30 December 1959 and transferred for scrapping, while her crew was disbanded on 6 February 1960.
