= Type 37 torpedo boat =

Nazi German ship class

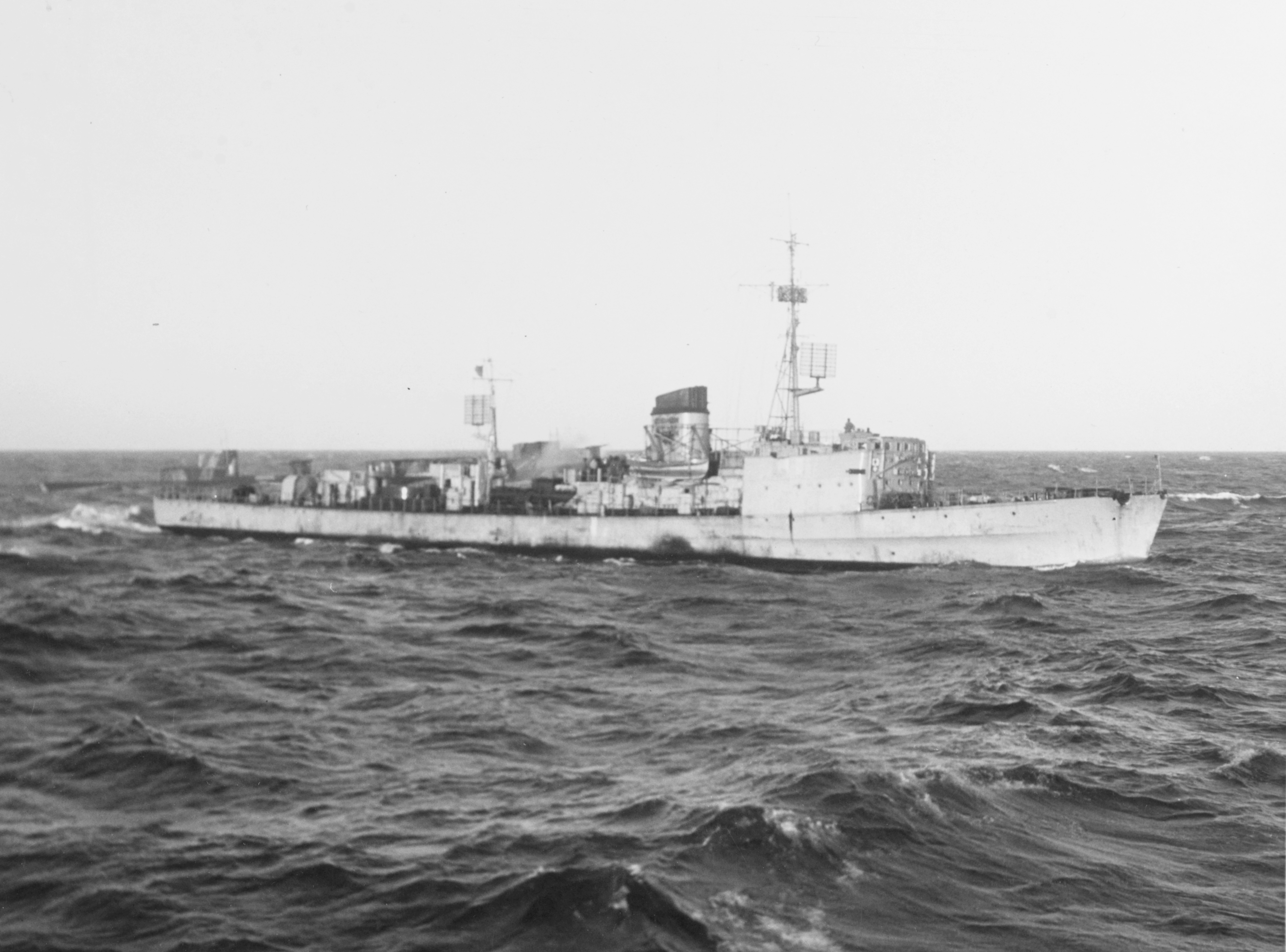
- T21 at sea, 2 July 1946, en route to be scuttled with her load of poison gas

Class overview
- Builders: Schichau-Werke
- Operators: Kriegsmarine; Soviet Navy
- Preceded by: Type 35 torpedo boat
- Succeeded by: Type 39 torpedo boat
- Built: 1938–1942
- In commission: 1941–1959
- Completed: 9
- Lost: 3
- Scrapped: 6

General characteristics (as built)
- Type: Torpedo boat
- Displacement: 888 t (874 long tons) (standard); 1,139 t (1,121 long tons) (deep load)
- Length: 85.2 m (279 ft 6 in) o/a
- Beam: 8.87 m (29 ft 1 in)
- Draft: 2.8 m (9 ft 2 in)
- Installed power: 4 × water-tube boilers; 31,000 shp (23,000 kW)
- Propulsion: 2 × shafts; 2 × geared steam turbines
- Speed: 35 knots (65 km/h; 40 mph)
- Range: 1,600 nmi (3,000 km; 1,800 mi) at 19 knots (35 km/h; 22 mph)
- Complement: 119
- Armament: 1 × single 10.5 cm (4.1 in) gun; 1 × single 3.7 cm (1.5 in) AA gun; 2 × single 2 cm (0.8 in) AA guns; 2 × triple 533 mm (21 in) torpedo tubes; 30–60 mines

The Type 37 torpedo boat was a class of nine torpedo boats built for Nazi Germany's Kriegsmarine during World War II. Completed in 1941–1942, one boat helped to escort a commerce raider passing through the English Channel into the Atlantic Ocean in late 1941, but their first major action was in early 1942 when they formed part of the escort for a pair of battleships and a heavy cruiser through the Channel back to Germany in the Channel Dash. Two pairs of boats were sent to France at different times in mid-1942 and were part of the escort during an unsuccessful attempt to pass a different commerce raider back through the Channel in October. One boat was assigned to the Torpedo School as a training ship in mid-1942 and the others followed in the next year.

Three boats were sent to Norway in early 1943 for escort duties, although one of them returned to Germany after only a couple of months. Two others were transferred back to France where they laid minefields and were unsuccessful in escorting an Italian blockade runner through the Bay of Biscay into the Atlantic. One boat was sunk by American heavy bombers in December. By the end of the year, all of the Type 37s were either refitting or serving as training ships for either the Torpedo School or U-boat flotillas. Advancing Soviet forces caused them to be recalled to active duty during 1944 to support German forces operating in the Baltic. One boat apiece was sunk in 1944 and 1945 and another was so badly damaged that it was written off as a constructive total loss and later scrapped. Five survived the war and were seized by the Allies as war reparations. Only the Soviet Union actually made use of its vessel and it was eventually used as a test ship before being scrapped in 1960.

== Design and description ==
The Type 37 torpedo boat was a slightly improved version of the preceding Type 35 with better range, although they used the same troublesome high-pressure boilers as the Type 35s. The maintenance problems with the boilers were exacerbated by the lack of access to the machinery allowed by the restricted spaces of the lightly-built and narrow hull. The naval historian Michael J. Whitley deemed "the whole concept, with the benefit of hindsight, must be considered a gross waste of men and materials, for these torpedo boats were rarely employed in their designed role."

The boats had an overall length of 85.2 meters (279 ft 6 in) and were 82 meters (269 ft 0 in) long at the waterline. They had a beam of 8.87 meters (29 ft 1 in), and a mean draft of 2.8 meters (9 ft 2 in) at deep load. The Type 37s displaced 888 metric tons (874 long tons) at standard load and 1,139 metric tons (1,121 long tons) at deep load. Their hull was divided into 11 watertight compartments and it was fitted with a double bottom that covered 75% of their length. They were considered excellent sea boats and were very maneuverable. Their crew numbered 119 officers and sailors.

The Type 37s had two sets of Wagner geared steam turbines, each driving a single three-bladed 2.45–2.6-meter (8 ft 0 in – 8 ft 6 in) propeller, using steam provided by four Wagner water-tube boilers that operated at a pressure of 70 kg/cm^{2} (6,865 kPa; 996 psi) and a temperature of 460 °C (860 °F). The turbines were designed to produce 31,000 shaft horsepower (23,000 kW) for a speed of 35 knots (65 km/h; 40 mph). The boats carried a maximum of 200 metric tons (197 long tons) of fuel oil which gave a range of 1,600 nautical miles (3,000 km; 1,800 mi) at 19 knots (35 km/h; 22 mph).

=== Armament ===
As built, the Type 37 class mounted a single 45-caliber 10.5 cm (4.1 in) SK C/32 (Note: In Kriegsmarine gun nomenclature, SK stands for Schiffskanone (ship's gun), C/32 stands for Constructionjahr (construction year) 1932.) gun on the stern. Its mount had a range of elevation from -10° to +50° and the gun fired 15.1-kilogram (33 lb) projectiles at a muzzle velocity of 785 m/s (2,580 ft/s). It had a range of 15,175 meters (16,596 yd) at an elevation of +44.4°.

Anti-aircraft defense was provided by a single 80-caliber 3.7 cm (1.5 in) SK C/30 anti-aircraft (AA) gun superfiring over the 10.5 cm gun. The hand-operated mount had a maximum elevation of 80° which gave the gun a ceiling of less than 6,800 metres (22,300 ft); horizontal range was 8,500 metres (9,300 yd) at an elevation of 35.7°. The single-shot SK C/30 fired 0.748-kilogram (1.65 lb) projectiles at a muzzle velocity of 1,000 m/s (3,300 ft/s) at a rate of 30 rounds per minute. The boats were also fitted with a pair of 65-caliber 2 cm (0.8 in) C/30 AA guns on the bridge wings. The gun had an effective rate of fire of about 120 rounds per minute. Its 0.12-kilogram (0.26 lb) projectiles were fired at a muzzle velocity of 875 m/s (2,870 ft/s) which gave it a ceiling of 3,700 meters (12,100 ft) and a maximum horizontal range of 4,800 meters (5,200 yd). Each boat carried 2,000 rounds per gun.

The boats were also equipped with six above-water 533 mm (21 in) torpedo tubes in two triple rotating mounts amidships and could also carry 30 mines (or 60 if the weather was good). They used the G7a torpedo which had a 300-kilogram (660 lb) warhead and three speed/range settings: 14,000 meters (15,000 yd) at 30 knots (56 km/h; 35 mph); 8,000 meters (8,700 yd) at 40 knots (74 km/h; 46 mph) and 6,000 meters (6,600 yd) at 44 knots (81 km/h; 51 mph).

=== Modifications ===
Early-war modifications were limited to the conversion of the foremast into a tripod mast, installation of a FuMO 28 (Note: German: Funkmess-Ortung (Radio-direction finder, active ranging.)) radar with fixed antennas angled 45° to each side and a 2 cm gun superfiring over the main gun. Boats participating in the Channel Dash in February 1942 were ordered to have their aft torpedo tube mount replaced by a quadruple 2 cm gun mount, but it is not certain if this was actually done. Confirmed deliveries of this mount began in May when they were installed in the superfiring position during refits on T13 and then on T14 in June. T13 and T17 received an additional 3.7 cm gun on their forecastle after November 1941. Another mount had been fitted on the searchlight platform amidships in T19, T18 and T21 by 1944. In September, installation of a single 3.7 cm gun was ordered, either the Flak M42 or the Flak M43, in lieu of the aft torpedo tubes, in all surviving boats, but it is also uncertain if this was done. Some boats did receive additional 4 cm (1.6 in) Bofors guns. They all received twin 2 cm gun mounts that replaced the single mounts in the bridge wings. Before the end of the war, all of the surviving boats probably had at least two 3.7 cm or 4 cm guns aboard.

== Ships ==
Construction data
Ship	Builder	Laid down	Launched	Completion	Fate
T13	Schichau, Elbing	26 September 1938	15 June 1939	31 May 1941	Sunk 10 April 1945 in Skagerrak by air attack.
T14	Schichau, Elbing	5 November 1938	20 July 1939	14 June 1941	Transferred to France as Dompaire. Stricken 8 November 1951 and scrapped.
T15	Schichau, Elbing	3 January 1939	16 September 1939	26 June 1941	Sunk 13 December 1943 at Kiel by RAF bombers.
T16	Schichau, Elbing	1 February 1939	20 November 1939	24 July 1941	Damaged beyond repair, 13 April 1945
T17	Schichau, Elbing	24 June 1939	13 March 1940	18 August 1941	Transferred to USSR post war, served as destroyer Poryvisty (Порывистый). Later (1952) East German Rosa Luxembourg; broken up 1957.
T18	Schichau, Elbing	27 July 1939	1 June 1940	22 November 1941	Sunk 17 September 1944; rocket attack by Soviet aircraft near Åland.
T19	Schichau, Elbing	23 September 1939	20 July 1940	18 December 1941	Transferred to US post war, then Denmark. Broken up 1951 without re-commissioning.
T20	Schichau, Elbing	28 November 1939	12 September 1940	5 June 1942	Transferred to France as Baccarat. Stricken 8 November 1951 and scrapped.
T21	Schichau, Elbing	27 March 1939	21 November 1940	11 July 1942	Transferred to USA post war; scuttled 16 December 1946 in Skagerrak.

== Service ==
Although several boats briefly escorted convoys in the Baltic during 1941, T14 was the first boat to see combat when she was ordered west and helped to escort the commerce raider Thor through the Channel and into the Atlantic in December. On the morning of 12 February 1942, the 3rd Torpedo Boat Flotilla (with T13, T15, T16 and T17) rendezvoused with the battleships Gneisenau and Scharnhorst and the heavy cruiser Prinz Eugen to help escort them through the Channel to Germany in the Channel Dash. The following month, T15, T16 and T17 were transferred to Norway for escort duties while T13 remained in France and was joined by T14 by July in the 3rd Torpedo Boat Flotilla when they laid several minefields in the Channel and escorted a replenishment oiler through the Bay of Biscay in an unsuccessful attempt to pass into the Atlantic. T18 and T19 were initially assigned as training ships for the Torpedo School from May to September, but then they were transferred to France. Reinforced by the two newcomers, the flotilla helped to escort German blockade runners sailing from ports in the Bay of Biscay en route to Japan in September–October. The flotilla made an unsuccessful attempt to escort Komet through the Channel in October. They were intercepted by a British force of five escort destroyers and eight motor torpedo boats that sank the raider on 14 October. T15 was assigned to the Torpedo School in August 1942 and spent the rest of the year and almost all of 1943 either undergoing a refit or serving as a training ship.

In early 1943, T16, T20 and T21 were transferred to Norway for escort duties. T16 returned in March and spent the rest of the year being overhauled or as a training ship for U-boat flotillas. The other two boats went back to Germany in October for refits before they were assigned to the Torpedo School. Around March, T13 and T17 returned to Germany for long refits and were assigned to the Torpedo School until mid-1944 upon their completion. T18 remained in France until July after having escorted the Italian blockade runner Himalaya in her failed attempt to break out through the Bay of Biscay to the Far East in late March and having laid a series of minefields in the Channel in May. In June–August, T19 was deployed in the Bay of Biscay to help escort U-boats through the Bay. Now assigned to the 5th Torpedo Boat Flotilla, she helped to lay minefields in the Channel on 3–5 and 29–30 September. T14 was the last of the boats in France before she was ordered home in November for service with the Torpedo School. T15 was sunk by American bombers in Kiel, Germany, on 13 December.

At the beginning of 1944, all of the Type 37s were either being refitted or serving as training ships for either the Torpedo School or U-boat flotillas. Beginning in May, when T21 became the first boat to be assigned to the Navy High Command Baltic (Marineoberkommando Ostsee), all the boats returned to active duty with the 3rd Torpedo Boat Flotilla there as advancing Soviet forces began to pose a significant aerial and naval threat to Axis shipping. T13, T18 and T20 sortied into the Archipelago Sea as a show of force on 12–13 September after the Prime Minister of Finland, Antti Hackzell, broke off diplomatic relations with Germany and ordered German forces to leave Finland on 2 September. On the return voyage, T18 was sunk by Soviet aircraft. On 23 September, T13, T17, T19 and T20 escorted the last evacuation convoy from Tallinn, Estonia, to Germany. During 10–12 and 13–15 October, T13, T16, T20 and T21, screened the heavy cruisers Lützow and Prinz Eugen as they bombarded advancing Soviet troops near Memel. T13, T19 and T21 escorted Lützow as she bombarded Soviet positions at Memel and Sworbe, on the Estonian island of Saaremaa, on 23–24 October. Screened by T13, T16, T19 and T21), Prinz Eugen and the heavy cruiser Admiral Scheer shelled Soviet positions during the evacuation of Sworbe, between 20 and 24 November. In December T20 began a major refit in Elbing, but the shipyard was threatened by the Soviets in February 1945 and she was towed to the Deschimag shipyard in Bremen on the 4th. Afterwards, the 3rd Flotilla was transferred to the Skagerrak to escort convoys and minelaying missions in the North Sea. On 3 April, T16 was badly damaged by British heavy bombers and was paid off as not worth repairing. On the night of 9/10 April, T13 was badly damaged by British heavy bombers and foundered early the next morning. T17 accidentally sank the German submarine U-235 with depth charges four days later. On 5 May T17 and T19 helped to ferry 45,000 refugees from East Prussia to Copenhagen, Denmark, and returned to transport 20,000 more to Glücksburg, Germany, on the 9th.

T14, T16, T17, T19, T20 and T21 survived the war, more or less. T16 was demolished by the Danes in 1946 and T21 was scuttled by the United States that same year. T14 and T20 were not originally allocated to France, but were transferred by the United States and Britain in early 1946. The French Navy did not use them and struck them from the Navy List in 1951 and they were subsequently broken up. The Danes purchased T19 from the United States, but also made not use of the boat and scrapped it in 1950–1951. The Soviet Navy was the only one to use one of the Type 37s when they put T17 into service with the Baltic Fleet in 1946 and renamed her Poryvisti. They converted the boat into a target control ship in 1949 and scrapped it in 1960.
