= German torpedo boat T21 =

German torpedo boat

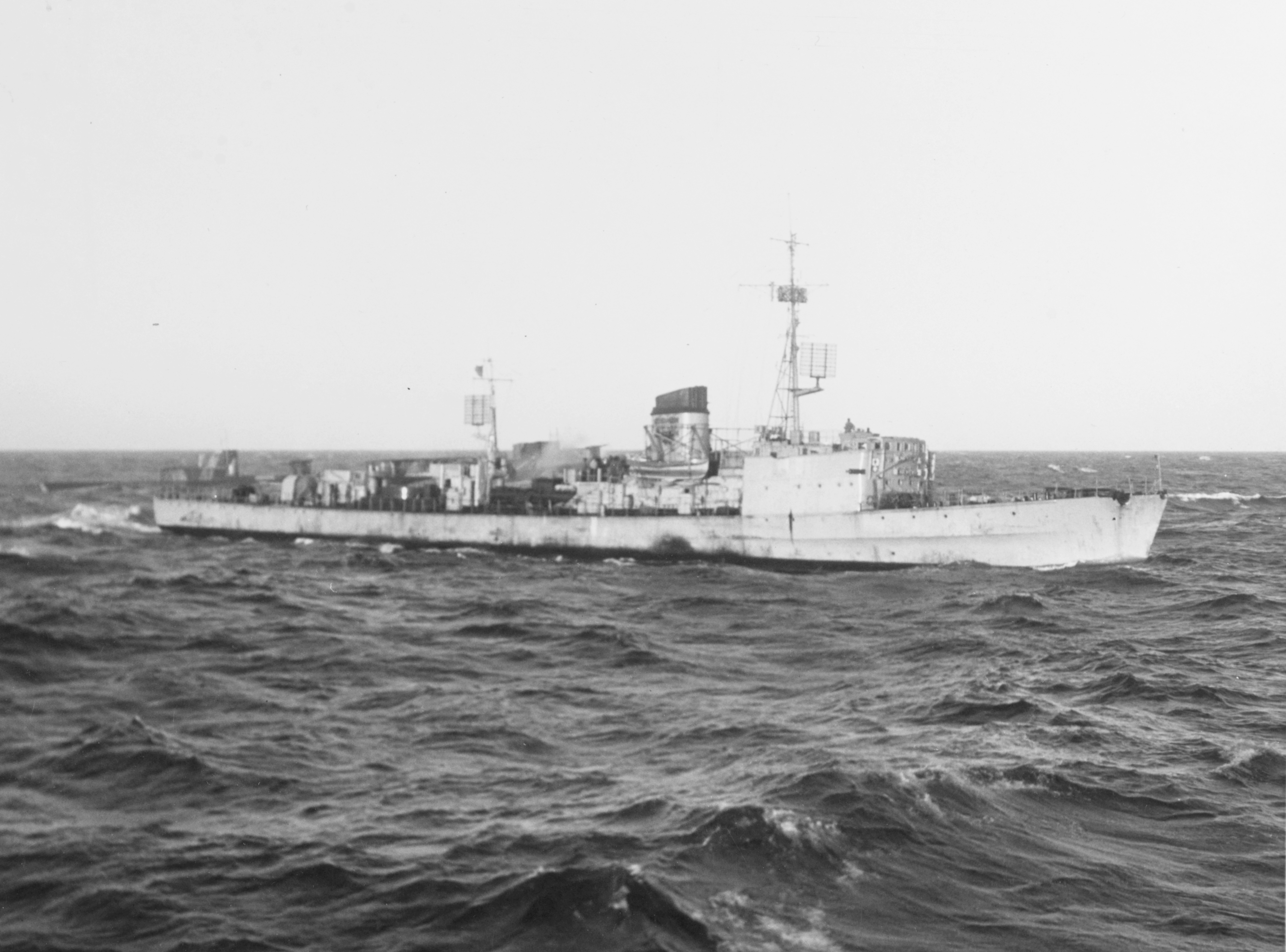
- T21 at sea, 2 July 1946, en route to be scuttled with her load of poison gas

History

Nazi Germany
- Name: T21
- Ordered: 5 October 1938
- Builder: Schichau, Elbing, East Prussia
- Yard number: 1448
- Laid down: 27 March 1939
- Launched: 2 November 1940
- Completed: 11 July 1942

General characteristics (as built)
- Class & type: Type 37 torpedo boat
- Displacement: 888 t (874 long tons) (standard); 1,139 t (1,121 long tons) (deep load)
- Length: 85.2 m (279 ft 6 in) o/a
- Beam: 8.87 m (29 ft 1 in)
- Draft: 2.8 m (9 ft 2 in)
- Installed power: 4 × water-tube boilers; 31,000 shp (23,000 kW)
- Propulsion: 2 × shafts; 2 × geared steam turbine sets
- Speed: 35 knots (65 km/h; 40 mph)
- Range: 1,600 nmi (3,000 km; 1,800 mi) at 19 knots (35 km/h; 22 mph)
- Complement: 119
- Armament: 1 × single 10.5 cm (4.1 in) gun; 1 × single 3.7 cm (1.5 in) AA gun; 2 × single 2 cm (0.8 in) AA guns; 2 × triple 533 mm (21 in) torpedo tubes; 30–60 mines

The German torpedo boat T21 was one of nine Type 37 torpedo boats built for the Kriegsmarine (German Navy) during World War II. Completed in mid-1942, she was transferred to Norway in March 1943 for escort duties. The ship returned to Germany in October and was assigned to the Torpedo School. T21 returned to active duty in May 1944 and supported German forces operating in the Baltic Sea. The boat began a major refit in December which had not been completed when the war ended in May 1945. She was allocated to the United States after the war, but was only used to dispose of gas munitions by scuttling her in deep water in 1946.

== Design and description ==
The Type 37 torpedo boat was a slightly improved version of the preceding Type 35 with better range. The boats had an overall length of 85.2 meters (279 ft 6 in) and were 82 meters (269 ft) long at the waterline. The ships had a beam of 8.87 meters (29 ft 1 in), and a mean draft of 2.8 meters (9 ft 2 in) at deep load. They displaced 888 metric tons (874 long tons) at standard load and 1,139 metric tons (1,121 long tons) at deep load. Their crew numbered 119 officers and sailors. Their pair of geared steam turbine sets, each driving one propeller shaft, were designed to produce 31,000 shaft horsepower (23,000 kW) using steam from four high-pressure water-tube boilers which was intended to give the boats a maximum speed of 35 knots (65 km/h; 40 mph). They carried enough fuel oil to give them a range of 1,600 nautical miles (3,000 km; 1,800 mi) at 19 knots (35 km/h; 22 mph).

As built, the Type 37s mounted a single 10.5 cm (4.1 in) SK C/32 gun on the stern. Anti-aircraft defense was provided by a single 3.7 cm (1.5 in) SK C/30 anti-aircraft gun superfiring over the 10.5 cm gun and a pair of 2 cm (0.8 in) C/30 guns on the bridge wings. They carried six above-water 533 mm (21 in) torpedo tubes in two triple mounts amidships and could also carry 30 mines (or 60 if the weather was good).

=== Modifications ===
Early-war modifications were limited to the conversion of the foremast into a tripod mast, installation of a FuMO 28 (Note: German: Funkmess-Ortung (Radio-direction finder, active ranging)) radar with fixed antennas angled 45° to each side. Quadruple 2 cm gun mounts began slowly replacing the 3.7 cm gun beginning in May 1942 as the ships were refitted. Another quadruple 2 cm mount had been fitted on the searchlight platform amidships in T21 by 1944. In September, installation of a single 3.7 cm gun was ordered, either the Flak M42 or the Flak M43, in lieu of the aft torpedo tubes, in all surviving boats, but it is uncertain if this was actually carried out. Some ships did receive additional 4 cm (1.6 in) Bofors guns. They all received twin 2 cm gun mounts that replaced the single mounts in the bridge wings. Before the end of the war, all of the surviving boats probably had at least two 3.7 cm or 4 cm guns aboard.

== Construction and career ==
T21 was ordered on 5 October 1938 from Schichau, laid down at their Elbing, East Prussia, shipyard on 27 March 1939 as yard number 1448, launched on 2 November 1940 and commissioned on 11 July 1942. On 1–3 October, the ship conducted exercises in the Baltic with the battleship Scharnhorst, the light cruisers Leipzig and Nürnberg, the destroyers Z25, Z31 and Z37, her sisters T13, T17, T20 and the torpedo boats T22, Falke and Kondor. On 7 March 1943, T21, T16, T20 and the torpedo boats Greif and Jaguar, joined the escorts for Scharnhorst on her voyage to the Arctic in the Skaggerak, although bad weather forced them to put into Bergen, Norway. T21 and T20 were then part of the escort force for the battleships Tirpitz and Scharnhorst and the heavy cruiser Lützow as they sailed from Narvik, Norway, to the Altafjord on 22–24 March.

The ship returned to Germany in October and was assigned to the Torpedo School until April 1944 when she returned to active duty supporting German forces in the Baltic. T21 began a refit at the Oderwerke shipyard in Stettin in August that lasted until September. During 10–15 October, the 3rd Torpedo Boat Flotilla, with T21, T16, T20 and T13, screened Lützow and the heavy cruiser Prinz Eugen as they bombarded advancing Soviet troops near Memel, Lithuania. Screened by the 2nd and 3rd Torpedo Boat Flotillas with (T5, T9, T12, T13, T16, T19 and T21), Prinz Eugen and the heavy cruiser Admiral Scheer shelled Soviet positions during the evacuation of Sworbe, on the Estonian island of Saaremaa, between 20 and 24 November. In December T21 began a major refit in Elbing, but the shipyard was threatened by advancing Soviet forces in February 1945 and she was towed to the Deschimag shipyard in Bremen on the 4th. The ship was decommissioned on 22 April. T21 was allocated to the United States when the Allies divided the surviving ships of the Kriegsmarine amongst themselves in late 1945. She was cannibalized for spare parts, loaded up with poison gas ammunition and scuttled in the Skaggerak on 10 June 1946. (Note: Sources differ on the date that she was sunk; Gröner and Gardiner and Chesneau give 16 December 1946. The date of the photograph in the infobox supports a different date entirely.)
