= German torpedo boat T20 =

German torpedo boat

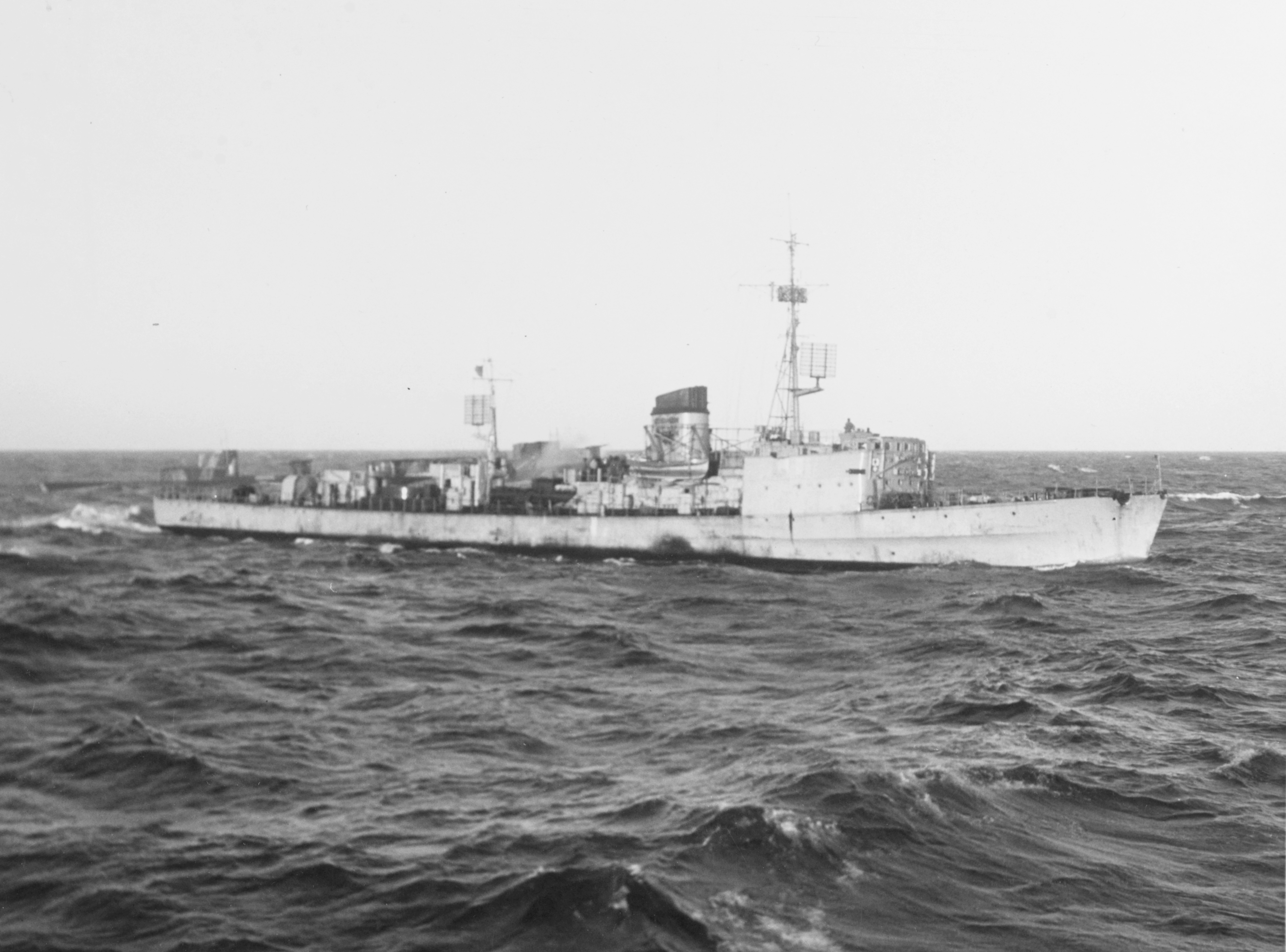
- Sister ship T21 at sea, 2 July 1946, en route to be scuttled with her load of poison gas

History

Nazi Germany
- Name: T20
- Ordered: 5 October 1938
- Builder: Schichau, Elbing, East Prussia
- Yard number: 1447
- Laid down: 28 November 1939
- Launched: 12 September 1940
- Completed: 5 June 1942
- Fate: Scrapped, 1951

General characteristics (as built)
- Class & type: Type 37 torpedo boat
- Displacement: 888 t (874 long tons) (standard); 1,139 t (1,121 long tons) (deep load)
- Length: 85.2 m (279 ft 6 in) o/a
- Beam: 8.87 m (29 ft 1 in)
- Draft: 2.8 m (9 ft 2 in)
- Installed power: 4 × water-tube boilers; 31,000 shp (23,000 kW)
- Propulsion: 2 × shafts; 2 × geared steam turbine sets
- Speed: 35 knots (65 km/h; 40 mph)
- Range: 1,600 nmi (3,000 km; 1,800 mi) at 19 knots (35 km/h; 22 mph)
- Complement: 119
- Armament: 1 × single 10.5 cm (4.1 in) gun; 1 × single 3.7 cm (1.5 in) AA gun; 2 × single 2 cm (0.8 in) AA guns; 2 × triple 533 mm (21 in) torpedo tubes; 30–60 mines

The German torpedo boat T20 was one of nine Type 37 torpedo boats built for the Kriegsmarine (German Navy) during World War II. Completed in mid-1942, she was transferred to Norway in March 1943 for escort duties. The ship returned to Germany in October and was assigned to the Torpedo School. T20 returned to active duty a year later and supported German forces operating in the Baltic Sea. She was then assigned escort duties in the Skagerrak around the beginning of 1945, which included covering minelaying missions. The ship was allocated to the British after the war, but she was transferred to France in 1946. Unused by the French Navy, she was stricken from the Navy List in 1951 and subsequently scrapped.

== Design and description ==
The Type 37 torpedo boat was a slightly improved version of the preceding Type 35 with better range. The boats had an overall length of 85.2 meters (279 ft 6 in) and were 82 meters (269 ft) long at the waterline. The ships had a beam of 8.87 meters (29 ft 1 in), and a mean draft of 2.8 meters (9 ft 2 in) at deep load. They displaced 888 metric tons (874 long tons) at standard load and 1,139 metric tons (1,121 long tons) at deep load. Their crew numbered 119 officers and sailors. Their pair of geared steam turbine sets, each driving one propeller shaft, were designed to produce 31,000 shaft horsepower (23,000 kW) using steam from four high-pressure water-tube boilers, which was intended to give the boats a maximum speed of 35 knots (65 km/h; 40 mph). They carried enough fuel oil to give them a range of 1,600 nautical miles (3,000 km; 1,800 mi) at 19 knots (35 km/h; 22 mph).

As built, the Type 37s mounted a single 10.5 cm (4.1 in) SK C/32 gun on the stern. Anti-aircraft defense was provided by a single 3.7 cm (1.5 in) SK C/30 anti-aircraft gun superfiring over the 10.5 cm gun and a pair of 2 cm (0.8 in) C/30 guns on the bridge wings. They carried six above-water 533 mm (21 in) torpedo tubes in two triple mounts amidships and could also carry 30 mines (or 60 if the weather was good).

=== Modifications ===
Early-war modifications were limited to the conversion of the foremast into a tripod mast, installation of a FuMO 28 (Note: German: Funkmess-Ortung (Radio-direction finder, active ranging)) radar with fixed antennas angled 45° to each side. Quadruple 2 cm gun mounts began slowly replacing the 3.7 cm gun beginning in May 1942, as the ships underwent refitting. In September, installation of a single 3.7 cm gun was ordered, either the Flak M42 or the Flak M43, in lieu of the aft torpedo tubes, in all surviving boats, but it is also uncertain if this was done. By war's end, T20 was armed with the 10.5 cm gun, two 3.7 cm guns, one quadruple 2 cm mount, and two pairs of 2 cm twin-gun mounts, one pair in the bridge wings and the other on platforms abaft the funnel. She still retained all of her torpedo tubes and had received twenty-one 8.6-centimeter (3.4 in) RAG anti-aircraft rocket launchers.

== Construction and career ==
T20 was ordered on 5 October 1938 from Schichau, laid down at their Elbing, East Prussia, shipyard on 28 November 1939 as yard number 1447, launched on 12 September 1940, and commissioned on 5 June 1942; construction was delayed by shortages of skilled labor and of raw materials. On 1–3 October, the ship conducted exercises in the Baltic with the battleship Scharnhorst, the light cruisers Leipzig and Nürnberg, the destroyers Z25, Z31, and Z37, her sisters T16, T17, T21, and the torpedo boats T22, Falke, and Kondor. On 7 March 1943, T20, T16, T21, and the torpedo boats Greif and Jaguar joined the escorts for Scharnhorst on her voyage to the Arctic in the Skagerrak, however bad weather forced them to put into Bergen, Norway. T20 and T21 were part of the escort force for the battleships Tirpitz and Scharnhorst and the heavy cruiser Lützow as they sailed from Narvik, Norway, to the Altafjord on 22–24 March.

The ship returned to Germany in October and was assigned to the Torpedo School until March 1944, when she began a refit that lasted until August. Reassigned to the 3rd Torpedo Boat Flotilla, T20 and her sisters T13 and T18 sortied into the Archipelago Sea as a show of force on 12–13 September after the Prime Minister of Finland, Antti Hackzell, broke off diplomatic relations with Germany and ordered German forces to leave Finland on 2 September. On the return voyage, T18 was sunk by Soviet aircraft. On 23 September, T20, T13, T17, and T19 escorted the last evacuation convoy from Tallinn, Estonia, to Germany. During 10–12 and 13–15 October, the 3rd Torpedo Boat Flotilla, with T20, T13, T16, and T21, screened Lützow and the heavy cruiser Prinz Eugen as they bombarded advancing Soviet troops near Memel. Afterwards, the 3rd Flotilla was transferred to the Skagerrak for convoy escort duties. The ship assisted in escorting a minelaying mission in the North Sea on 13–14 January 1945. Together with T17 and T19, T20 escorted another minelaying mission there on 17–18 March. The torpedo boat was allocated to the British when the Allies divided the surviving ships of the Kriegsmarine amongst themselves in late 1945. The Royal Navy had no interest in her, and she was transferred to France in February 1946, and was renamed Baccarat on 4 February. The ship was immediately placed in reserve until she was stricken on 8 October 1951 and subsequently scrapped.
