= Schichau-Werke =

German engineering works and shipyard

F. Schichau GmbH
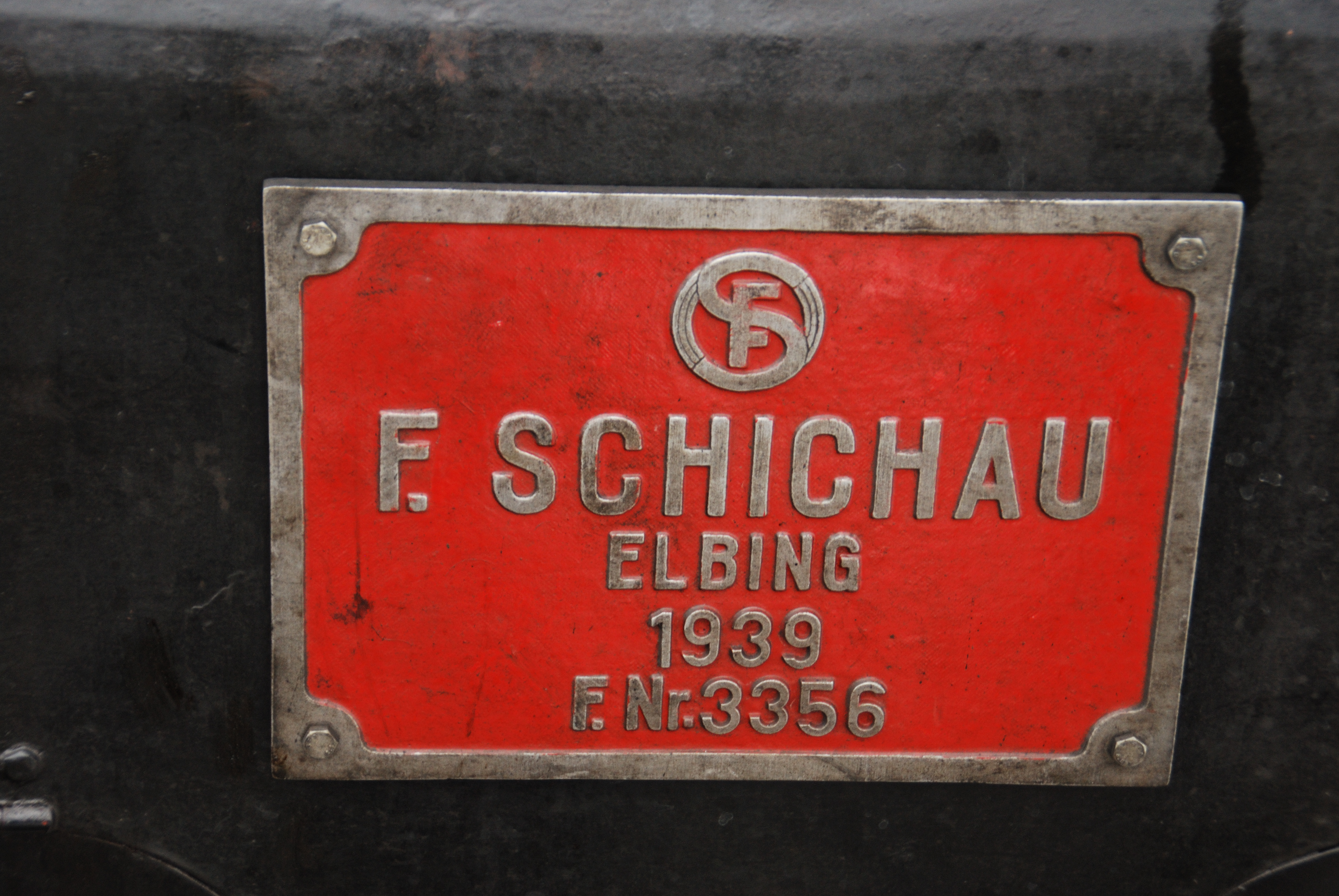
- Locomotive nameplate
- Type: GmbH
- Industry: Mechanical engineering shipbuilding Locomotive manufacturing
- Founded: 1837
- Defunct: January 1945
- Successor: Schiffbau-Gesellschaft Unterweser
- Headquarters: Elbing
- Number of employees: About 7,800 when it closed

The Schichau-Werke (F. Schichau, Maschinen- und Lokomotivfabrik, Schiffswerft und Eisengießerei GmbH) was a German engineering works and shipyard based in Elbing, Germany (now Elbląg, Poland) on the Vistula Lagoon of then-East Prussia. It also had a subsidiary shipyard in nearby Danzig (now: Gdańsk, Poland). Due to the Soviet conquest of eastern Germany, Schichau moved to Bremerhaven in March 1945, and its successors continued in business until 2009.

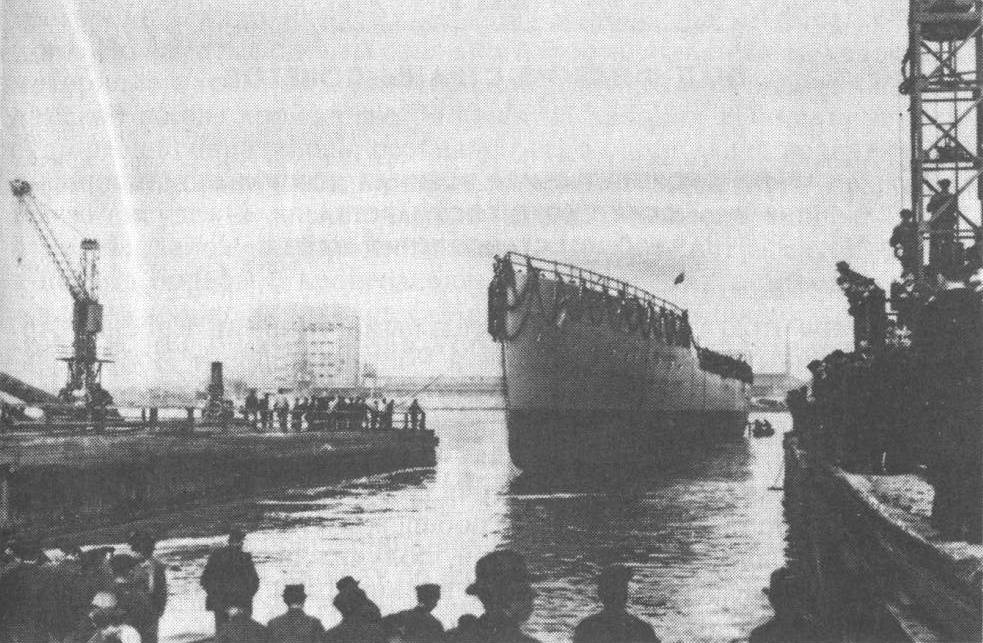
A light cruiser hull, which eventually became the SMS Pillau, is launched at Schichau, Danzig, in 1914, shortly before World War I.

== Early years ==
Ferdinand Schichau had studied engineering in Berlin, the Rheinland and Great Britain. In 1837, he founded the engineering institution, later known as F. Schichau GmbH, Maschinen- und Lokomotivfabrik (F. Schichau engineering and locomotive factory) in Elbing. It started with the production of hydraulic presses and diggers; in 1860, it began to produce locomotives for the Prussian Eastern Railway. From 1867 locomotive construction began in earnest, and three years later, the factory was connected to the railway network. In the early 20th century, the firm was one of several that built the Prussian P 8, the most numerous steam locomotive of its day.

== Shipyards ==
From 1847, Schichau produced steam engines for ships, starting with the engine for the first entirely Prussian-built steamer James Watt (built by nearby Mitzlaff shipyard). In 1854, Schichau built the shipyard at Elbing, known as the Elbinger Dampfschiffs-Reederei F. Schichau ('Elbing Steamship Shipping Company F. Schichau'). The first ship launched was the small steamer Borussia in 1855 – the first Prussian iron propeller ship. The shipyard was subsequently expanded, and in 1872 Schichau acquired Mitzlaff's yard.

From 1877 the shipyard produced ships for the Prussian Navy and export, becoming specialized in torpedo boats and later destroyers. It became a major manufacturer of torpedo boats for the Prussian Navy. The engine of S 1, which was built by Schichau in 1884 as one of Germany's first torpedo boats, is shown on display in the Deutsches Museum in Munich today.

Since the shipyard's location on the Elbing River limited the size of ships that could be constructed, in 1892 Schichau built a second shipyard in Danzig, which was capable of producing bigger warships, up to battleship size, as well as freighters and passenger ships. Both shipyards also built ships for export worldwide, especially torpedo boats. In 1889 Schichau built a small repair shipyard in Pillau (now Baltijsk, Russia) near Königsberg (now Kaliningrad, Russia). Schichau's son-in-law, Carl Heinz Ziese, worked at Schichau-Werke and continued to run the business after Schichau's death in 1896, until 1917.

In 1910, Schichau-Werke began production of Tumleren-class torpedo boats for the Royal Danish Navy.

=== Interwar years ===
When Ziese died in 1917, the management of the company passed to the husband of his only daughter, Hildegard, the Swede Carl Carlson. After his death, Hildegard Carlson ran the firm. After World War I, the shipyard was threatened with bankruptcy and in 1929 it was bought by the German government. In 1930, the company bought a small yard in Königsberg.

After the First World War, the Schichau works, together with the Union-Giesserei in Königsberg (that they later took over), was encouraged to focus on locomotive building with the aid of government subsidies known as Osthilfe ("Eastern Aid"). During the Second World War, the firm of Borsig placed several contracts with the Schichau-Werke in Elbing, that continued production until January 1945.

=== WWII years ===
During World War II, the Polish resistance conducted espionage of the Schichau shipyards in Gdańsk, Elbląg and Königsberg. In 1941–1944 F. Schichau was operator of Nobel & Lessner shipyard in German-occupied Tallinn.

== U-boat production ==
During World War II, Schichau built 94 U-boats for the Kriegsmarine (German Navy) at its Danzig shipyard. The yard in Elbing produced midget submarines of the Seehund class. In addition to the manufacture of Type VII C submarines, the shipyard in Danzig also built the revolutionary Type XXI U-boats. Up to 1944, 62 Type VII C U-boats (and two Type VII C/41s) were built, before production was switched to the Type XXI. A total of 30 submarines of this latter class were built and launched at Danzig by the end of the war, but never saw combat.

== Forced labor ==
During World War II prisoners from Poland, France, the Netherlands, Lithuania, Latvia, Germany and Hungary were transported from satellite camps of Stutthof concentration camp near Danzig to work at Schichau. The prisoners received inadequate rations: half a litre of thin soup and 250 grams of bread per day. There was no winter clothing. Many of these forced laborers died as a result of epidemics, accidents, and beatings by the guards. Bodies were burned in a crematorium but also buried in mass graves at the cemetery in Saspe (now the Zaspa district of Gdańsk).

== Locomotive production ==
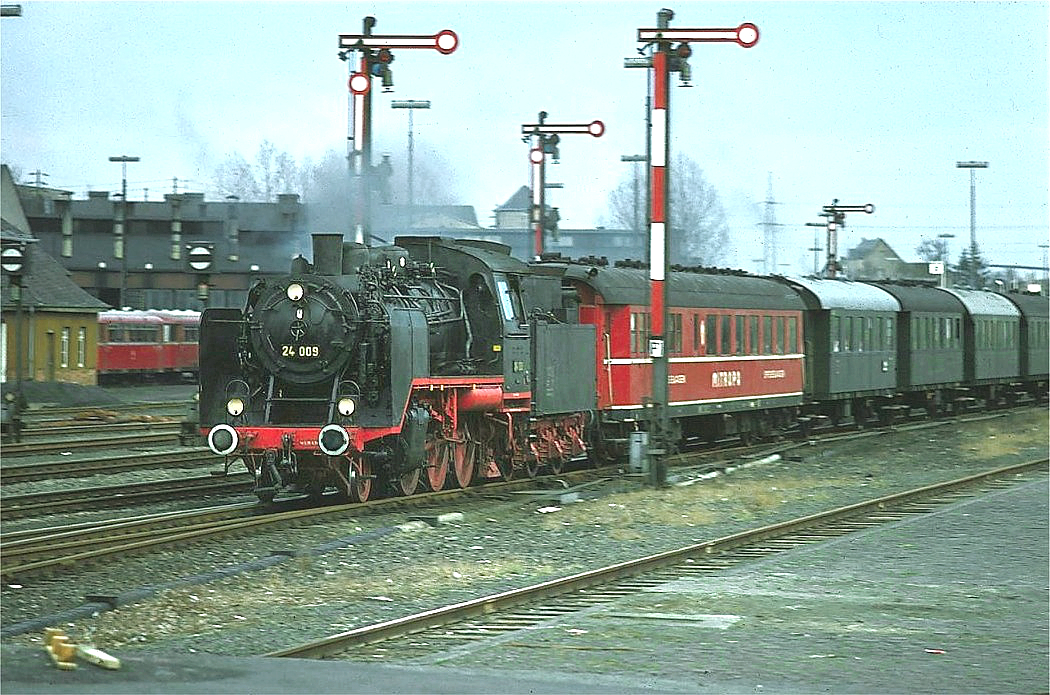
Class 24 2-6-0 locomotive from Schichau

Up to the end of the war in 1945, the Schichau-Werke had supplied about 4,300 locomotives of several classes to customers that included the Deutsche Reichsbahn and GEDOB formed from disbanded Polish State Railways. These included the DRG and DRB standard steam locomotive (Einheitsdampflokomotive) classes 23, 41, and DRB Class 52 Kriegslokomotive. as well as DRG Class 86. The Schichau-Werke also designed the Class 24 and delivered its first two orders.

After the war, the shipyards were acquired by Poland – to which the region was assigned by border changes promulgated at the Potsdam Conference. Postwar production included ships, railcars and boilers. The Schichau shipyard at Danzig was subsumed into the Lenin shipyard in 1950 and, in 1980, attracted worldwide media coverage as a result of protests led by the Solidarność trade union.

== Recent history ==
In early 1945, Schichau transferred a floating dock Flender Werke in Lübeck. In March 1945, as Soviet forces approached, Hermann Noë, the chief executive, and some employees fled Danzig with uncompleted ships to Bremerhaven. In April Noë founded there a new Schichau company. In the early postwar years, the company repaired machinery, agricultural engines, locomotives and trams. After the Western Allies lifted the ban on shipbuilding in West Germany in 1951, Schichau reopened its shipyard in Bremerhaven.

Schichau later was merged into Schichau Seebeckwerft, in Bremerhaven, which continued in business until 2009. In July 1945, the company's former Königsberg site became the Soviet (now Russian) Yantar Shipyard.

== Ships built by Schichau (selection) ==
=== Civilian ships ===
- Arayat (1931), Commonwealth of the Philippines customs inspection and enforcement cutter, sunk December 1941, refloated by Imperial Japanese Navy as patrol boat No. 105
- Banahao (1930), Commonwealth of the Philippines lighthouse tender, sunk December 1941
- Columbus (1922), then Homeric
- Üsküdar (1927), Turkish passenger ferry, sank in 1958
- Canlaon (1930), Commonwealth of the Philippines lighthouse tender, sunk December 1941

=== Naval ships ===
==== Battleships ====
- Wittelsbach-class battleship
  - SMS Wettin: Launched 6 January 1901
- Braunschweig-class battleships
  - SMS Elsass: Launched 26 May 1903
  - SMS Lothringen: Launched 27 May 1904
- Helgoland-class battleship
  - SMS Oldenburg: Launched 30 June 1910
- Kaiser-class battleship
  - SMS König Albert: Launched 27 April 1912
- Bayern-class battleship
  - SMS Baden: Launched 30 October 1915

==== Battlecruisers ====
- Derfflinger-class battlecruiser
  - SMS Lützow: Launched 29 November 1913
- Mackensen-class battlecruiser
  - SMS Graf Spee: Launched 15 September 1917

==== Submarines (U-boats) ====
- 64 Type VII submarines (1939–1944)
- 30 Type XXI submarines (1943–1945)

==== Großes Torpedoboot 1913 class Torpedo Boats ====
- S31
- S32
- S33
- S34
- S35
- S36

==== Großes Torpedoboot 1916 class Torpedo Boats ====
- SMS S113

==== Torpedoboot 1935 ====
- 6 x Torpedoboot 1935
  - T1
  - T2
  - T3
  - T4
  - T9
  - T10

==== Torpedoboot 1937 ====
- 9 x Torpedoboot 1937
  - T13
  - T14
  - T15
  - T16
  - T17
  - T18
  - T19
  - T20
  - T21

==== Flottentorpoedoboot 1939 ====
- 15 x Flottentorpedoboot 1939
  - T22
  - T23
  - T24
  - T25
  - T26
  - T27
  - T28
  - T29
  - T30
  - T31
  - T32
  - T33
  - T34
  - T35
  - T36

==== Flottentorpedoboot 1941 ====
- 15 x Flottentorpedoboot 1941 (construction started, non of them where finished before the end of the war)

==== Foreign navies ====
- Novik (Russian cruiser)
- USS Somers (torpedo boat)
- NMS Trotușul (torpedo boat)

== Schichau-built ships still afloat ==
- Stralsund (built in 1890), small railway ferry, Wolgast, Germany
- Jacob Langeberg, ex von Bötticher (built in 1902), tug and icebreaker, originally used on the Kiel Canal, today in Wormerveer, Netherlands

Sabine, formerly Berby, formerly Aegir, built Elbing 1895 yard no, 562 . Inspection vessel for Kaiserliche Canalbau-Commission 90 hp single. Today berthed in Deptford Creek, London.

== Sources ==
- Werkbahn: Schichau Werke
- Important busts in the memorial hall of the Deutsches Museum, including Ferdinand Schichau
- F.Schichau developed a steamship engine with triple-expansion
