= German torpedo boat T12 =

German torpedo boat

- Right elevation and plan of the Type 1935

History

Nazi Germany
- Name: T12
- Ordered: 29 June 1936
- Builder: DeSchiMAG, Bremen
- Yard number: 939
- Laid down: 20 August 1938
- Launched: 12 April 1939
- Completed: 3 July 1940
- Fate: Transferred to the Soviet Union as war reparations, late 1945

Soviet Union
- Name: T12
- Acquired: 5 November 1945
- Renamed: Podvizhny, 1946, Kit, 1954
- Fate: Sunk in northwestern Lake Ladoga, 1959

General characteristics (as built)
- Class & type: Type 35 torpedo boat
- Displacement: 859 long tons (873 t) (standard); 1,108 long tons (1,126 t) (deep load)
- Length: 84.3 m (276 ft 7 in) o/a
- Beam: 8.62 m (28 ft 3 in)
- Draft: 2.83 m (9 ft 3 in)
- Installed power: 4 × water-tube boilers; 31,000 shp (23,000 kW)
- Propulsion: 2 × shafts; 2 × geared steam turbines
- Speed: 35 knots (65 km/h; 40 mph)
- Range: 1,200 nmi (2,200 km; 1,400 mi) at 19 knots (35 km/h; 22 mph)
- Complement: 119
- Armament: 1 × single 10.5 cm (4.1 in) gun; 1 × single 3.7 cm (1.5 in) AA guns; 2 × single 2 cm (0.8 in) AA guns; 2 × triple 533 mm (21 in) torpedo tubes; 30–60 mines

The German torpedo boat T12 was the last of a dozen Type 35 torpedo boats built for the Kriegsmarine (German Navy) during the late 1930s. Completed in mid-1940, the boat was transferred to Norway where she escorted minelayers as they laid minefields in the North Sea. She was one of the escorts for several commerce raiders passing through the English Channel in 1941 and helped to escort a pair of battleships and a heavy cruiser through the Channel back to Germany in the Channel Dash in early 1942. T12 was assigned to the Torpedo School in late 1943 and was then transferred to the Baltic Sea in mid-1944 where she escorted heavy cruisers as they bombarded Soviet positions. The boat was allocated to the Soviet Union after the war and renamed Podvizhny (Russian: Подвижный, "Agile"), serving with the Baltic Fleet until she was seriously damaged in a boiler explosion. Renamed Kit (Russian: Кит, "Whale") in 1954 for use as a vessel in simulated nuclear testing on Lake Ladoga, the boat was scuttled in 1959.

== Design and description ==
The Type 35 was an unsuccessful attempt by the Kriegsmarine to design a fast, ocean-going torpedo boat that did not exceed the 600-long-ton (610 t) displacement limit of the London Naval Treaty for ships that counted against the national tonnage limit. The boats had an overall length of 84.3 meters (276 ft 7 in) and were 82.2 meters (269 ft 8 in) long at the waterline. After the bow was rebuilt in 1941 to improve seaworthiness, the overall length increased to 87.1 meters (285 ft 9 in). The ships had a beam of 8.62 meters (28 ft 3 in), and a mean draft of 2.83 meters (9 ft 3 in) at deep load and displaced 859 metric tons (845 long tons) at standard load and 1,108 metric tons (1,091 long tons) at deep load. Their crew numbered 119 officers and sailors. Their pair of geared steam turbine sets, each driving one propeller, were designed to produce 31,000 shaft horsepower (23,000 kW) using steam from four high-pressure water-tube boilers which would propel the boats at 35 knots (65 km/h; 40 mph). They carried enough fuel oil to give them a range of 1,200 nautical miles (2,200 km; 1,400 mi) at 19 knots (35 km/h; 22 mph).

As built, the Type 35 class mounted a single 10.5 cm (4.1 in) SK C/32 gun on the stern. Anti-aircraft defense was provided by a single 3.7 cm (1.5 in) SK C/30 anti-aircraft gun superfiring over the 10.5 cm gun and a pair of 2 cm (0.8 in) C/30 guns on the bridge wings. They carried six above-water 533 mm (21 in) torpedo tubes in two triple mounts and could also carry 30 mines (or 60 if the weather was good). Many boats exchanged the 3.7 cm gun for another 2 cm gun, depth charges and minesweeping paravanes before completion. Late-war additions were limited to the installation of radar, radar detectors and additional AA guns, usually at the expense of the aft torpedo tube mount.

== Construction and career ==
T12 was ordered on 29 June 1936 from DeSchiMAG, laid down at their Bremen shipyard on 20 August 1938 as yard number 939, launched on 12 April 1939 and commissioned on 3 July 1940. The boat was working up until September when she was transferred to Norway. T12 and the torpedo boat Falke escorted a minelaying mission from Stavanger on the night of 26/27 January 1941 and then another one the following night. The boat was refitted in Wesermünde from March to September. On 16 November, T12 and her sister ships T4 and T7, departed Copenhagen, Denmark, en route to Cherbourg, France, to meet the commerce raider Komet. The torpedo boats arrived on the 25th and Komet reached Cherbourg the following day. The ships departed that night and arrived at Le Havre the following morning, where they waited for night to fall before proceeding. The British had spotted them and they were intercepted by motor torpedo boats (MTB) on the 28th between Boulogne and Dunkirk. In a very confused night action, T12 accidentally hit T4 several times, injuring several men, but they were successful in passing Komet through the Channel and into the Atlantic. On 2 December T12 and T2 rendezvoused with the commerce raider Thor in the Schillig Roads; after they were joined by T4, T7 and the torpedo boat T14 the following day, they began to escort Thor through the Channel. Delayed by heavy fog, the ships did not reach Brest, France, until the 15th, while Thor continued onwards into the Atlantic. T12 and T7 sailed for Germany on 17 December, where the former was to begin a brief refit at Kiel.

On the morning of 12 February 1942, the 2nd and 3rd Torpedo Boat Flotillas (with T12, and her sisters T2, T4, T5, T11, T12 and the torpedo boats T13, T15, T16, and T17 respectively) rendezvoused with the battleships Gneisenau and Scharnhorst and the heavy cruiser Prinz Eugen to escort them through the Channel to Germany in the Channel Dash. After arriving in Germany, T12 and T5 were transferred to Norway for escort duties. On 6 March they briefly screened the battleship Tirpitz as she searched for the Russia-bound Convoy PQ 12. The boat was one of the escorts for the badly damaged Prinz Eugen from Trondheim to Kiel on 16–18 May (Operation Zauberflote (Magic Flute)), together with T11 and the destroyers Z25 and Z5 Paul Jacobi. She began a refit upon her arrival that lasted until August. On 15–19 August T12 was one of the escorts, together with T9 and the destroyer Z23, for the minelayer Ulm from Kiel to Narvik, Norway.

T12 was assigned to the 2nd Torpedo Boat Flotilla in France in October. Although escorted by T12, T2, Falke and the torpedo boats T18 and T23, the Italian blockade runner Himalaya failed in her attempt to break out through the Bay of Biscay to the Far East when she was spotted by British aircraft in late March 1943. T12 received a refit in Kiel in May–August and was then assigned to the Torpedo School from December through mid-1944. Rejoining the 2nd Flotilla, now consisting of T12, her sisters T3, T5, T9, and the torpedo boats T13 and T16, the flotilla screened the heavy cruiser Admiral Scheer as she shelled Soviet positions during the evacuation of Sworbe, on the island of Ösel, on the night of 23/24 November. Two months later, T12 was one of the escorts for Prinz Eugen as the latter ship supported a German counterattack against advancing Soviet forces near Cranz, East Prussia, on 29–30 January 1945.

The boat was allocated to the Soviets when the Allies divided the surviving ships of the Kriegsmarine amongst themselves in late 1945, and was included on the Soviet Navy vessel list on 5 November, assigned to the Baltic Fleet. She was handed over to a Soviet crew in Germany on 27 December, who raised the naval jack of the Soviet Navy aboard her on New Year's Day 1946. She was renamed Podvizhny on 13 February 1946 before joining the North Baltic Fleet two days later. Podvizhny served with the fleet until 1949, when two crewmen were killed and the boat seriously damaged when the main steam pipe exploded during exercises. After failed repair attempts, she was withdrawn from service on 8 April 1953, disarmed, and handed over to the central directorate of the Soviet Navy as an unpowered experimental vessel, being renamed Kit on 30 December 1954. The boat was sunk in shallow water off the islands of Heinäsenmaa and Makarinsaari in northwestern Lake Ladoga after simulated nuclear testing in early 1959 and struck on 13 March of that year. In mid-1991, the radioactively contaminated wreck was raised by a team from the Leningrad Naval Base and towed to a different location, where it was scuttled.
