= German torpedo boat Falke =

German naval vessel

Falke
- Right elevation and plan of the Type 23

History

Germany
- Name: Falke
- Namesake: Falcon
- Builder: Reichsmarinewerft Wilhelmshaven
- Yard number: 107
- Laid down: 17 November 1925
- Launched: 29 September 1926
- Commissioned: 15 July 1928
- Fate: Sunk, 15 June 1944

General characteristics (as built)
- Class & type: Type 23 torpedo boat
- Displacement: 923 long tons (938 t) (standard); 1,290 long tons (1,310 t) (deep load)
- Length: 87.7 m (287 ft 9 in) (o/a)
- Beam: 8.25 m (27 ft 1 in)
- Draft: 3.65 m (12 ft)
- Installed power: 3 × water-tube boilers; 23,000 shp (17,000 kW)
- Propulsion: 2 × shafts; 2 × geared steam turbine sets
- Speed: 32–34 knots (59–63 km/h; 37–39 mph)
- Range: 1,800 nmi (3,300 km; 2,100 mi) at 17 knots (31 km/h; 20 mph)
- Complement: 120
- Armament: 3 × single 10.5 cm (4.1 in) guns; 2 × triple 500 mm (19.7 in) torpedo tubes; 30 mines

Falke was the sixth and last Type 23 torpedo boat built for the German Navy (initially called the Reichsmarine and then renamed as the Kriegsmarine in 1935). The boat made multiple non-intervention patrols during the Spanish Civil War in the late 1930s. During World War II, she played a minor role in the Norwegian Campaign of 1940. Falke spent the next several months escorting minelayers as they laid minefields and damaged heavy ships back to Germany before she was transferred to France around September. She started laying minefields herself that month and continued to do so for the rest of the war. After a refit in early 1941, the boat was transferred to the Skaggerak where she was assigned escort duties. Falke returned to France in 1942 and was one of the escorts for the capital ships sailing from France to Germany through the English Channel in the Channel Dash. She helped to escort blockade runners, commerce raiders and submarines through the Channel and the Bay of Biscay for the next several years. The boat attacked Allied ships during the Invasion of Normandy in June 1944, but was sunk by British bombers that same month.

== Design and armament ==
Derived from the World War I-era large torpedo boat SMS H145, (Note: "SMS" stands for "Seiner Majestät Schiff" (German: His Majesty's Ship).) the Type 23 torpedo boat was slightly larger, but had a similar armament and speed. The Type 23 had an overall length of 87.7 meters (287 ft 9 in) and was 85.7 meters (281 ft 2 in) long at the waterline. The ships had a beam of 8.25 meters (27 ft 1 in), and a mean draft of 3.65 meters (12 ft). They displaced 923 long tons (938 t) at standard load and 1,290 long tons (1,310 t) at deep load. Falke was fitted with a pair of Vulcan geared steam turbine sets, each driving one propeller, that were designed to produce 23,000 shaft horsepower (17,000 kW) using steam from three water-tube boilers which would propel the ship at 33 knots (61 km/h; 38 mph). The torpedo boats carried enough fuel oil to give them an intended range of 3,600 nautical miles (6,700 km; 4,100 mi) at 17 knots (31 km/h; 20 mph), but it proved to be only 1,800 nmi (3,300 km; 2,100 mi) at that speed in service. Their crew consisted of 4 officers and 116 sailors.

As built, the Type 23s mounted three 10.5 cm (4.1 in) SK L/45 (Note: In Imperial German Navy gun nomenclature, "SK" (Schnelladekanone) denotes that the gun is quick firing, while the L/45 denotes the length of the gun. In this case, the L/45 gun is 45 caliber, meaning that the gun is 45 times as long as it is in diameter.) guns, one forward and two aft of the superstructure; the aft superfiring gun was on an open mount while the others were protected by gun shields. They carried six above-water 50 cm (19.7 in) torpedo tubes in two triple mounts and could also carry up to 30 mines. After 1931, the torpedo tubes were replaced by 533-millimeter (21 in) tubes and a pair of 2-centimeter (0.8 in) C/30 (Note: In Kriegsmarine gun nomenclature, SK stands for Schiffskanone (ship's gun), C/30 stands for Constructionjahr (construction year) 1930.) anti-aircraft guns were added. During the war a quadruple 2 cm mount was added just forward of No. 2 gun, three 2 cm guns were positioned around the aft funnel and another pair were mounted on the bridge wings, all in single mounts. Around 1944 a FuMB 4 Sumatra radar detector was installed as was radar.

== Construction and career ==
Named after the Falcon, the boat was laid down at the Reichsmarinewerft Wilhelmshaven (Navy Yard) on 17 November 1925. as yard number 106, launched on 29 September 1926 and commissioned on 15 July 1928. The boat was initially assigned to the 4th Torpedo Boat Half Flotilla. By the end of 1936 Falke was assigned to the 4th Torpedo Boat Flotilla and the boat made several deployments to Spain during the Spanish Civil War.

=== Second World War ===
Now assigned to the 5th Torpedo Boat Flotilla, Falke was used in the North Sea mining operations that began on 3 September 1939. Together with three destroyers and her sisters Albatros and Greif, Falke was tasked with anti-contraband patrols in the Kattegat and Skaggerak from 3 to 5 October that impounded four ships. Together with the torpedo boat Jaguar, Falke impounded six ships in the Skaggerak during a contraband patrol in 14–16 December. During the Norwegian Campaign, Falke and Jaguar, among other ships, briefly rendered assistance to the torpedoed heavy cruiser Lützow before continuing onwards to Kristiansand on 11 April with reinforcements. On 4–5 June Falke and Jaguar provided the anti-submarine screen from Kiel, Germany, to the Skaggerak for an unsuccessful attempt to intercept the Allied convoys evacuating Northern Norway by the battleships Gneisenau and Scharnhorst and the heavy cruiser Admiral Hipper. From 21 to 23 June, Falke was one of the escorts for the badly damaged Scharnhorst from Norway to Kiel. Now assigned to the 5th Torpedo Boat Flotilla, Falke, her sister Kondor, and the torpedo boats Jaguar, T2, T7 and T8 escorted minelayers as they laid a minefield in the southwestern North Sea on 7–8 August. The flotilla escorted other minelaying missions in the same area on 14–15 August, 31 August – 2 September and 6–7 September. Reinforced by the torpedo boat Wolf, the flotilla made an unsuccessful sortie off the Isle of Wight on 8–9 October. They made a second, more successful, sortie on 11–12 October, sinking two Free French submarine chasers and two British trawlers. The 5th Flotilla was transferred to St. Nazaire later that month and its ships laid a minefield off Dover on 3–4 December and another one in the Channel on 21–22 December.

==== 1941–1944 ====
Now based in Norway, Falke and the torpedo boat T12 escorted a minelaying mission from Stavanger on the night of 26/27 January 1941 and then another one the following night. Falke escorted another such mission on 3–4 February, together with the 1st and 2nd Torpedo Boat Flotillas. The boat was refitted in Rotterdam, Netherlands, from March to May 1941. She was transferred afterwards to the Skagerrak where she was on convoy escort duties until January 1942 when she rejoined the 5th Flotilla in the West. The flotilla joined the escort force for Scharnhorst, Gneisenau and the heavy cruiser Prinz Eugen on 12 February 1942 off Cap Gris-Nez during the Channel Dash. From 12 March to 2 April, the flotilla escorted the commerce raider Michel through the Channel despite heavy British attacks, damaging the British destroyers HMS Walpole and Fernie. The flotilla escorted the commerce raider Stier through the English Channel from 12 to 19 May. In heavy fighting on the 13th, British motor torpedo boats (MTBs) sank her sister, Seeadler, and the torpedo boat Iltis while losing one of their own boats. Falke was refitted in Wilhelmshaven from June to August and returned to France. Falke and Kondor and the torpedo boats T22 and T23 escorted the Italian blockade runner, SS Cortellazzo, from Bordeaux through the Bay of Biscay on 29–30 November.

Falke, T2, T12, T23, and the torpedo boat T18 escort another Italian blockade runner, Himalaya, but she turned back on 28 March 1943 when spotted by a British reconnaissance aircraft. Falke, Greif, Kondor, Möwe and T22 laid two minefields in the English Channel on 4–6 June. Later that month the ships returned to the Bay of Biscay to help escort U-boats through the Bay and continued to do so into early August. The flotilla was ordered to transfer from Cherbourg to Le Havre and departed on the night of 23/24 May 1944. Möwe, Greif, Falke, Kondor and Jaguar were attacked by Allied aircraft early the next day and Greif was struck by two bombs that set her forward boiler room on fire and caused her to take on water forward. With both boiler rooms subsequently flooded, she was unmaneuverable and accidentally collided with Falke. The latter was only slightly damaged, but Greif's bow was badly bent which caused problems for Möwe when she began to tow her sister. Around 06:00 Greif lost all power and sank at 06:32. At 07:43 Kondor struck a mine and had to be towed by Möwe for the remainder of the voyage.

As the Allies began landing in Normandy on 6 June, the 5th Flotilla, now consisting of Möwe, Falke, Jaguar and the newly refitted torpedo boat T28, sortied multiple times from Le Havre over the next week in attempts to sink Allied shipping. Despite the expenditure of over 50 torpedoes and large quantities of ammunition, they were generally unsuccessful, only sinking the destroyer HNoMS Svenner on 6 June. During an air raid by the Royal Air Force on the night of 14/15 June, bombs sank Falke and Jaguar and badly damaged Möwe.

== Bibliography ==
- Campbell, John (1985). Naval Weapons of World War II. Annapolis, Maryland: Naval Institute Press. ISBN 978-0-87021-459-2.
- Friedman, Norman (2011). Naval Weapons of World War One: Guns, Torpedoes, Mines and ASW Weapons of All Nations; An Illustrated Directory. Barnsley, UK: Seaforth Publishing. ISBN 978-1-84832-100-7.
- Gröner, Erich (1990). German Warships 1815–1945. Vol. 1: Major Surface Warships. Annapolis, Maryland: Naval Institute Press. ISBN 0-87021-790-9.
- Haarr, Geirr H. (2010). The Battle for Norway – April–June 1940. Barnsley, UK: Seaforth Publishing. ISBN 978-1-84832-057-4.
- Haarr, Geirr H. (2009). The German Invasion of Norway, April 1940. Annapolis, Maryland: Naval Institute Press. ISBN 978-1-59114-310-9.
- Rohwer, Jürgen (2005). Chronology of the War at Sea 1939–1945: The Naval History of World War Two (Third Revised ed.). Annapolis, Maryland: Naval Institute Press. ISBN 1-59114-119-2.
- Sieche, Erwin (1980). "Germany". In Chesneau, Roger (ed.). Conway's All the World's Fighting Ships 1922–1946. London: Conway Maritime Press. ISBN 0-85177-146-7.
- Whitley, M. J. (2000). Destroyers of World War Two: An International Encyclopedia. London: Cassell & Co. ISBN 1-85409-521-8.
- Whitley, M. J. (1991). German Destroyers of World War Two. Annapolis, Maryland: Naval Institute Press. ISBN 1-55750-302-8.
