= 3.7 cm Flak 43 =

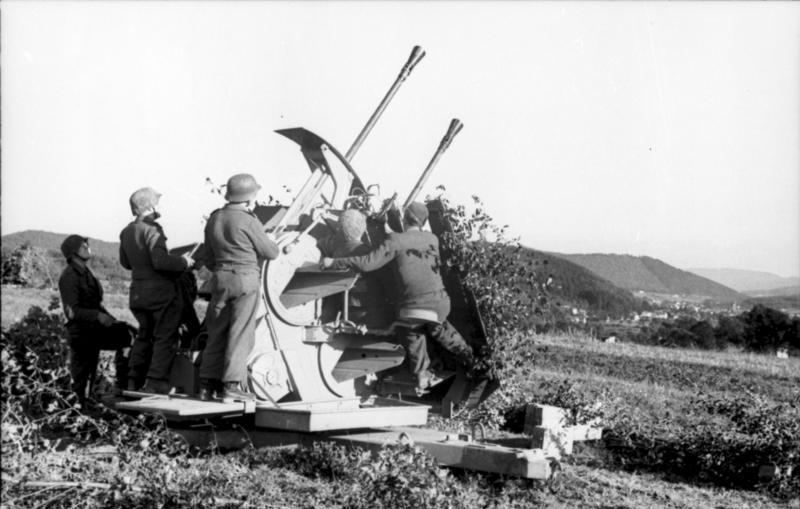
- A Flak 43 Zwilling in Northern France, mid-1944
- Type: Anti-aircraft gun
- Place of origin: Nazi Germany

Service history
- In service: 1944-1945
- Used by: Germany
- Wars: World War II

Production history
- Designer: Rheinmetall-Borsig
- Designed: 1939–1943
- Produced: 1944–1945

Specifications
- Mass: 355 kg (783 lb)
- Barrel length: 2.106 m (82.9 in) (57 calibers)
- Crew: 3–4
- Shell: 37 × 263B
- Shell weight: 635–700 g (1.4–1.5 lb)
- Caliber: 37 mm (1.5 in)
- Breech: Gas-operated
- Elevation: -10° to +90°
- Traverse: 360°
- Rate of fire: 250 rounds per minute (cyclic); 180 rounds per minute (practical)
- Muzzle velocity: 790–820 m/s (2,600–2,700 ft/s)
- Effective firing range: 6,585 m (7,201 yd) (ground targets); 4,800 m (15,700 ft) (ceiling)
- Feed system: 8-round clips

The 3.7 cm Flak 43 was a light anti-aircraft (AA) gun used by Nazi Germany during World War II. It was derived from the 3.7-centimeter (1.5 in) Flak 18/36/37 series of AA guns. It was provided with single- and twin-gun mounts, the latter being designated as the 3.7 cm Flak 43 Zwilling and was in service from 1944 to 1945. In addition to versions used by the Kriegsmarine (German Navy), it served as the main armament of the Ostwind and Möbelwagen and was proposed for use in the Flakpanzer Coelian self-propelled AA guns.

== Background and description ==
Rheinmetall-Borsig redesigned the Flak 36/37 to incorporate the gas-operated breech mechanism of the 3-centimeter (1.18 in) MK 103 and to reduce the number of man-hours required to manufacture it from 4320 to 1000. The most obvious change was the adoption of a horizontal feed system from the vertical system of the earlier guns. The feed tray was positioned inside the oversized trunnions at the gun's center of gravity so it could be reloaded without disturbing the gun's aim. These changes significantly lightened the gun and made it faster to traverse and elevate.

=== Naval use ===
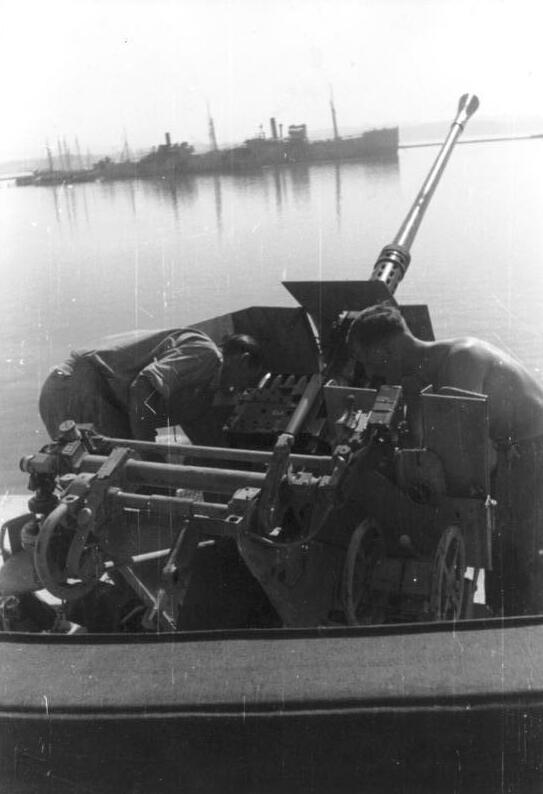
A Flak M43 on a single Flak LM 43 mount

The Kriegsmarine used a version of it on surface ships as the 3.7 cm Flak M43 in its own single- and twin-gun mounts; its Flak LM 44 mount had the guns side-by-side, unlike the Zwilling.

== Service ==
The first Flak 43s were reported in Luftwaffe service in August 1944, 431 single guns and 41 Zwilling mounts. By February 1945, these increased to 1032 single guns and 380 Zwillings.

== Bibliography ==
- Campbell, John (1985). Naval Weapons of World War II. Annapolis, Maryland: Naval Institute Press. ISBN 0-87021-459-4.
- Chamberlain, Peter & Gander, Terry (1975). Anti-Aircraft Guns. World War 2 Fact Files. New York: Arco Publishing Co. ISBN 0-668-03818-7.
- DiGiulian, Tony (2 December 2015). "Germany 3.7 cm/57 (1.5") Flak M43". NavWeaps.
- Gander, Terry & Chamberlain, Peter (1979). Weapons of the Third Reich: An Encyclopedic Survey of All Small Arms, Artillery, and Special Weapons of the German Land Forces, 1939-1945. Garden City, New York: Doubleday. ISBN 0-385-15090-3.
- Hogg, Ian V. (2013). German Artillery of World War Two. Barnsley, UK: Frontline Books. ISBN 978-1-84832-725-2.
- Skwiot, Miroslaw (2011). German Naval Guns 1939–1945. Annapolis, Maryland: Naval Institute Press. ISBN 978-1-59114-311-6.
- Williams, Tony G. (2000). Rapid Fire: The Development of Automatic Cannon, Heavy Machine Guns and Their Ammunition for Armies, Navies and Air Forces. Shrewsbury, UK: Airlife Publishing. ISBN 1-84037-122-6.
