= 10.5 cm SK C/32 naval gun =

10.5 cm SK C/32
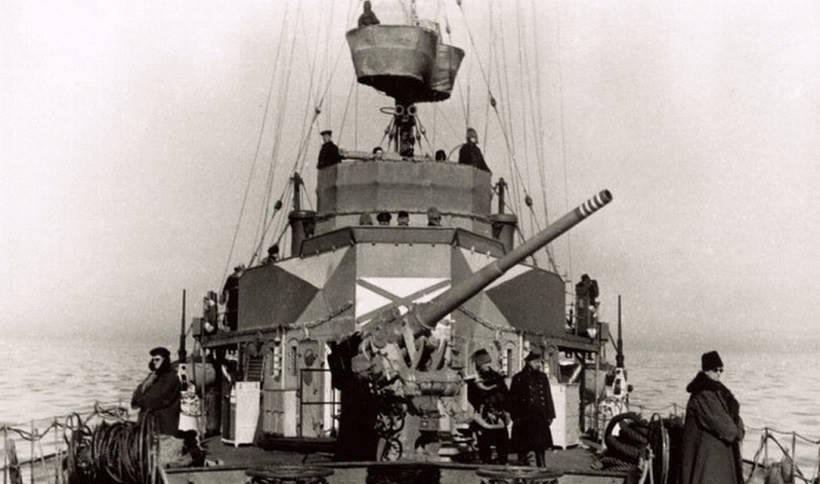
- The SK C/32 bow gun of Amiral Murgescu
- Type: Naval gun Anti-aircraft gun Coastal defence gun
- Place of origin: Nazi Germany

Service history
- In service: 1936−2002
- Used by: Nazi Germany; Romania; Norway
- Wars: World War II

Specifications
- Mass: 1,585–1,785 kilograms (3,494–3,935 lb)
- Length: 4.74–4.86 meters (15 ft 7 in – 15 ft 11 in)
- Barrel length: 4.4 meters (14 ft 5 in) (bore length)
- Shell: Fixed
- Shell weight: 15.1 kilograms (33 lb)
- Caliber: 10.5 centimeters (4.1 in)
- Elevation: Dependent on mount: MPLC/30: -9 to +80; MPLC/32: -10 to +50; MPLC/32 gE: -10 to +70; Ubts LC/32: -10 to +35; Ubts LC/36: -10 to +30
- Muzzle velocity: 785 m/s (2,580 ft/s)
- Maximum firing range: Horizontal: 15 kilometers (16,000 yd) at +44.4° Ceiling: 10,300-metre (33,800 ft) at +80°

The 10.5 cm SK C/32 (SK - Schiffskanone (ship board cannon) C - Construktionsjahr (year of design), was a widely used German naval gun on a variety of Kriegsmarine ships during World War II. Originally designed as a surface weapon, it was used in a number of other roles such as anti-aircraft and coastal defence; wet-mounts were developed for U-boats.

== Description ==
The 10.5 cm SK C/32 was a built-up gun, 45 calibers long, with a jacket and breech that weighed about 1.8 tons. The gun fired 10.5 centimeters (4.1 in) fixed ammunition, which was 1.51 m (5.0 ft) long, weighed 24.2 kg (53 lb) and had a 4.08-kilogram (9.0 lb) propellant charge. Useful life expectancy was 4,100 effective full charges (EFC) per barrel.

== Surface ships ==
The 10.5 cm SK C/32 was widely deployed on three different types of single mounts. The high-angle MPLC/30 was a modified 8.8 cm mount. The low-angle MPLC/32 was used on Type 35 torpedo boats, Type 37 torpedo boats and Type 40 minesweepers. The high-angle MPLC/32 gE was used on the cruiser Emden, the battleship Schlesien, the battleship Schleswig-Holstein, Elbing class torpedo boats, Type 35 minesweepers and Type 43 minesweepers.

Two guns formed the main armament of the Romanian multi-purpose vessel Amiral Murgescu.

== U-boats ==
The 10.5 cm SK C/32 was the standard low-angle deck gun mounted forward of the conning tower in type I, type IX and type X U-boats. The Ubts LC/32 mounting used in type I and early type IX U-boats weighed about 5 tonnes. Later type IX and type XB U-boats used the lighter Ubts LC/36 mounting with a maximum elevation of +30° . During the early war years, these guns were used to encourage surrender of independently routed merchant ships or to sink ships damaged by torpedoes.

Some of these guns were later removed from U-boats for mounting aboard type 40 minesweepers after unshielded deck guns proved impractical in action against Defensively Equipped Merchant Ships and escorted trade convoys.

One gun was mounted aboard the submarine Marsuinul of the Romanian Navy. The gun, together with her six 533 mm torpedo tubes, made her the most powerful Axis submarine in the Black Sea.

== Coastal defence ==
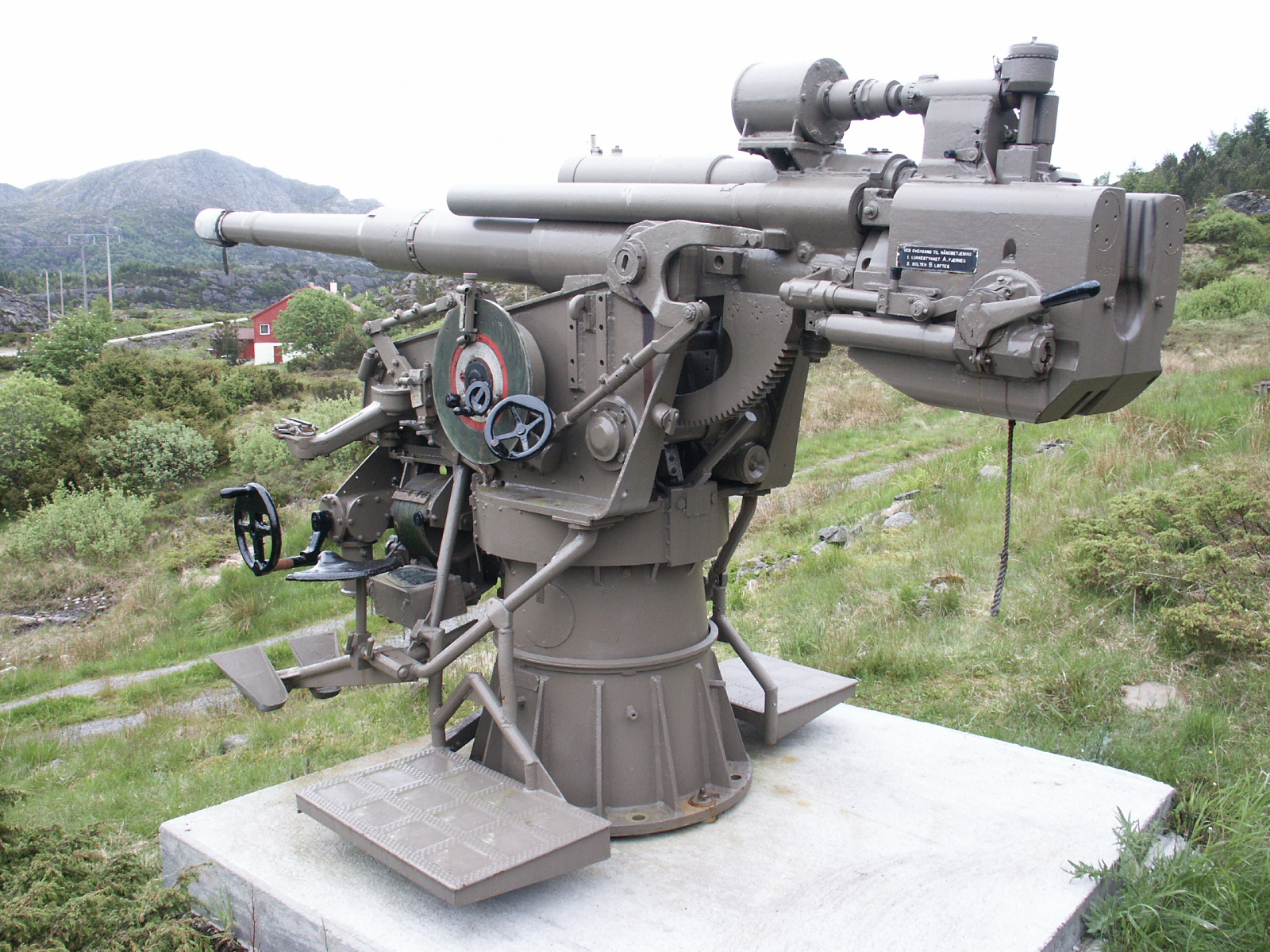
105 mm SK C/32 on display at Fjell Fortress, Norway

Norway used this gun in coastal defence batteries until 2002.

== See also ==
- List of naval guns

=== Weapons of comparable role, performance and era ===
- QF 4 inch Mk XII & Mk XXII guns : Slightly less powerful British equivalent submarine guns
