= German torpedo boat Iltis =

Type 24 torpedo boat

Iltis
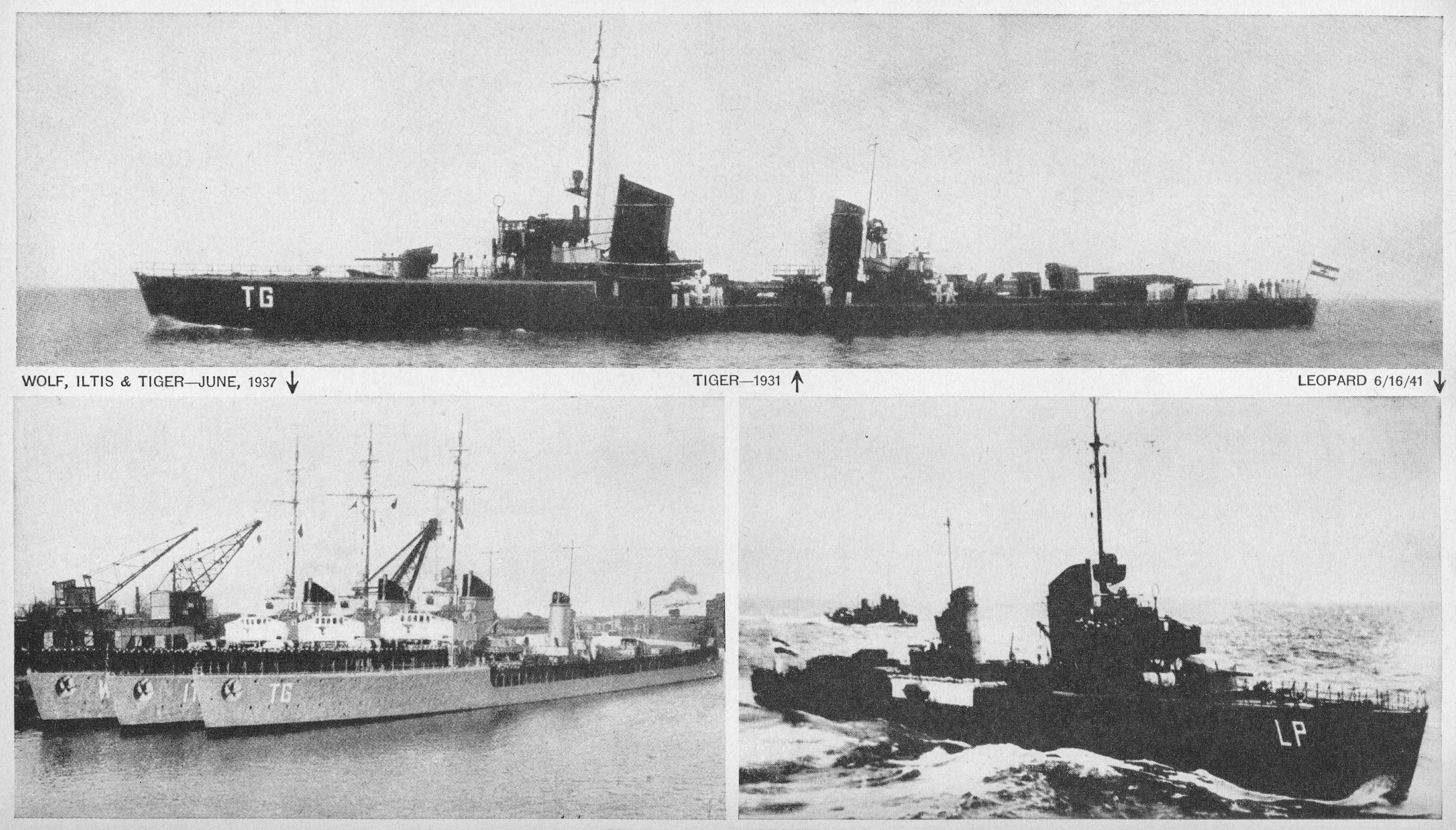
- Type 1924 (Raubtier-class) torpedo boats

History

Germany
- Name: Iltis
- Namesake: Polecat
- Builder: Reichsmarinewerft Wilhelmshaven
- Yard number: 110
- Laid down: 8 March 1927
- Launched: 12 October 1927
- Commissioned: 1 October 1928
- Fate: Sunk by MTBs during the action of 13 May 1942

General characteristics (as built)
- Class & type: Type 24 torpedo boat
- Displacement: 932 long tons (947 t) (standard); 1,319 long tons (1,340 t) (deep load)
- Length: 92.6 m (303 ft 10 in) (o/a)
- Beam: 8.65 m (28 ft 5 in)
- Draft: 3.52 m (11 ft 7 in)
- Installed power: 3 × water-tube boilers; 23,000 shp (17,000 kW)
- Propulsion: 2 × shafts; 2 × geared steam turbine sets
- Speed: 34 knots (63 km/h; 39 mph)
- Range: 1,997 nmi (3,698 km; 2,298 mi) at 17 knots (31 km/h; 20 mph)
- Complement: 129
- Armament: 3 × single 10.5 cm (4.1 in) guns; 2 × triple 500 mm (19.7 in) torpedo tubes; 30 mines

Iltis was the lead ship of her class of six torpedo boats built for the German Navy (initially called the Reichsmarine and then renamed as the Kriegsmarine in 1935) during the 1920s. The boat made multiple non-intervention patrols during the Spanish Civil War in the late 1930s. During World War II, she did not participate in the Norwegian Campaign of 1940 as she was under repair after having accidentally rammed and sunk a U-boat. Iltis spent the next couple of years escorting minelayers as they laid minefields and laying minefields herself. She also spent the latter half of 1941 escorting convoys through the Skaggerak. The boat returned to France in 1942 and was one of the escorts for the capital ships sailing from France to Germany through the English Channel in the Channel Dash. Iltis then helped to escort one commerce raider through the Channel and was sunk by British forces while escorting another blockade runner in May.

== Design and armament ==
Derived from the preceding Type 23 torpedo boat, the Type 24 was slightly larger and faster, but had a similar armament. The boats had an overall length of 92.6 meters (303 ft 10 in) and were 89 meters (292 ft) long at the waterline. They had a beam of 8.65 meters (28 ft 5 in), and a mean draft of 3.52 meters (11 ft 7 in). The Type 24s displaced 932 long tons (947 t) at standard load and 1,319 long tons (1,340 t) at deep load. Wolf's pair of Brown-Boveri geared steam turbine sets, each driving one propeller, were designed to produce 23,000 metric horsepower (17,000 kW; 23,000 shp) using steam from three water-tube boilers which would propel the ship at 34 knots (63 km/h; 39 mph). The boats carried enough fuel oil to give them a range of 1,997 nmi (3,698 km; 2,298 mi) at 17 knots (31 km/h; 20 mph). Their crew numbered 129 officers and sailors.

As built, the Type 24s mounted three 10.5 cm (4.1 in) SK C/28 (Note: In Kriegsmarine gun nomenclature, SK stands for Schiffskanone (ship's gun), C/30 stands for Constructionjahr (construction year) 1930.) guns, one forward and two aft of the superstructure, numbered one through three from bow to stern. They carried six above-water 50 cm (19.7 in) torpedo tubes in two triple mounts amidships and could also carry up to 30 mines. After 1931, the torpedo tubes were replaced by 533 mm (21 in) tubes and a pair of 2 cm (0.8 in) C/30 anti-aircraft guns were added. During the war another pair of 2 cm guns may have been added before her loss.

== Construction and career ==
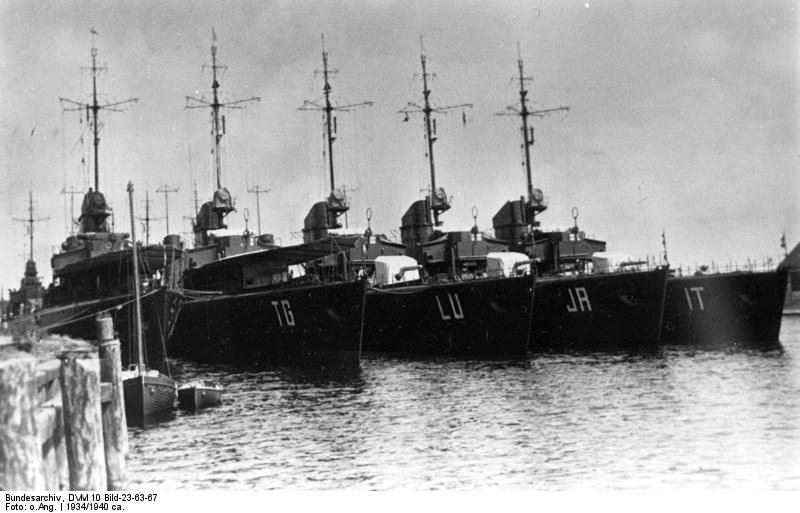
Tiger, Luchs, Jaguar and Iltis (from left to right) at anchor, 1934

Iltis (German: Polecat) was laid down at the Reichsmarinewerft Wilhelmshaven (Navy Yard) on 8 March 1927 as yard number 110, launched on 12 October 1927 and commissioned on 1 October 1928. The boat was initially assigned to the 3rd Torpedo Boat Half-Flotilla and by the end of 1936 she was assigned to the 3rd Torpedo Boat Flotilla. She made several deployments to Spain during the Spanish Civil War. Around June 1938, Iltis was transferred to the 3rd Torpedo Boat Flotilla, shortly before it was renumbered as the 6th Flotilla.

=== Second World War ===
Iltis supported the North Sea mining operations that began on 3 September 1939. On 17–19 October the ship, together with her sister ships Leopard and Wolf, and three destroyers patrolled the Skagerrak to inspect neutral shipping for contraband goods. On 13, 18 and 19 November, the 6th Flotilla and one or two light cruisers met destroyers returning from minelaying missions off the English coast. Two days later the flotilla made another contraband patrol in the Skagerrak before returning to port on the 25th. Iltis accidentally rammed and sank the submarine U-15 on 30 January 1940.

The boat began a refit in Wesermünde shortly afterwards that lasted until May. On 26 July Iltis and her sister, Luchs, sortied from Stavanger, Norway, to meet with the crippled Gneisenau en route from Trondheim to Kiel for repairs. They rendezvoused with the battleship at 12:45 and an explosion occurred aboard Luchs at 15:49. She broke in half off Jæren and sank with the loss of 102 men. The other escorts made an unsuccessful search for a submarine and rescued the few survivors. Now assigned to the 5th Torpedo Boat Flotilla, Iltis, her sister Jaguar and the torpedo boats Falke, Greif, Kondor, T2, and T3 escorted minelayers as they laid a minefield in the southwestern North Sea on 14–15 August. The flotilla escorted other minelaying missions in the same area on 31 August – 2 September and 6–7 September. Iltis and Jaguar laid a minefield off Dover on 29–30 October and then again on 2–3 December.

Iltis, the torpedo boat Seeadler and the destroyer Z4 Richard Beitzen were the escorts for a minelaying mission at the northern entrance to the Channel on 23–24 January 1941. Iltis and Jaguar laid a minefield off Eastbourne on 25–26 February and then again on 5–6 March. The pair escorted the battleships Scharnhorst and Gneisenau into Brest, France on 22 March after their North Atlantic raid. Iltis began a refit the following month at the Wilton-Fijenoord shipyard in Rotterdam, Netherlands, that lasted until June. She was transferred afterwards to the Skagerrak where she was on convoy escort duties until October. The ship was then transferred to France in January 1942, rejoining the 5th Flotilla. They joined the escort force for Scharnhorst, Gneisenau and the heavy cruiser Prinz Eugen on 12 February off Cap Gris-Nez during the Channel Dash. From 12 March to 2 April, the flotilla escorted the commerce raider Michel through the Channel despite heavy British attacks, damaging the British destroyers HMS Walpole and Fernie. The flotilla escorted the commerce raider Stier through the English Channel from 12 to 19 May. In heavy fighting on the 13th, British motor torpedo boats torpedoed Iltis, which broke in half with the loss of 115 crewmen.
