= German torpedo boat Jaguar =

1928 Type 24 torpedo boat

Jaguar
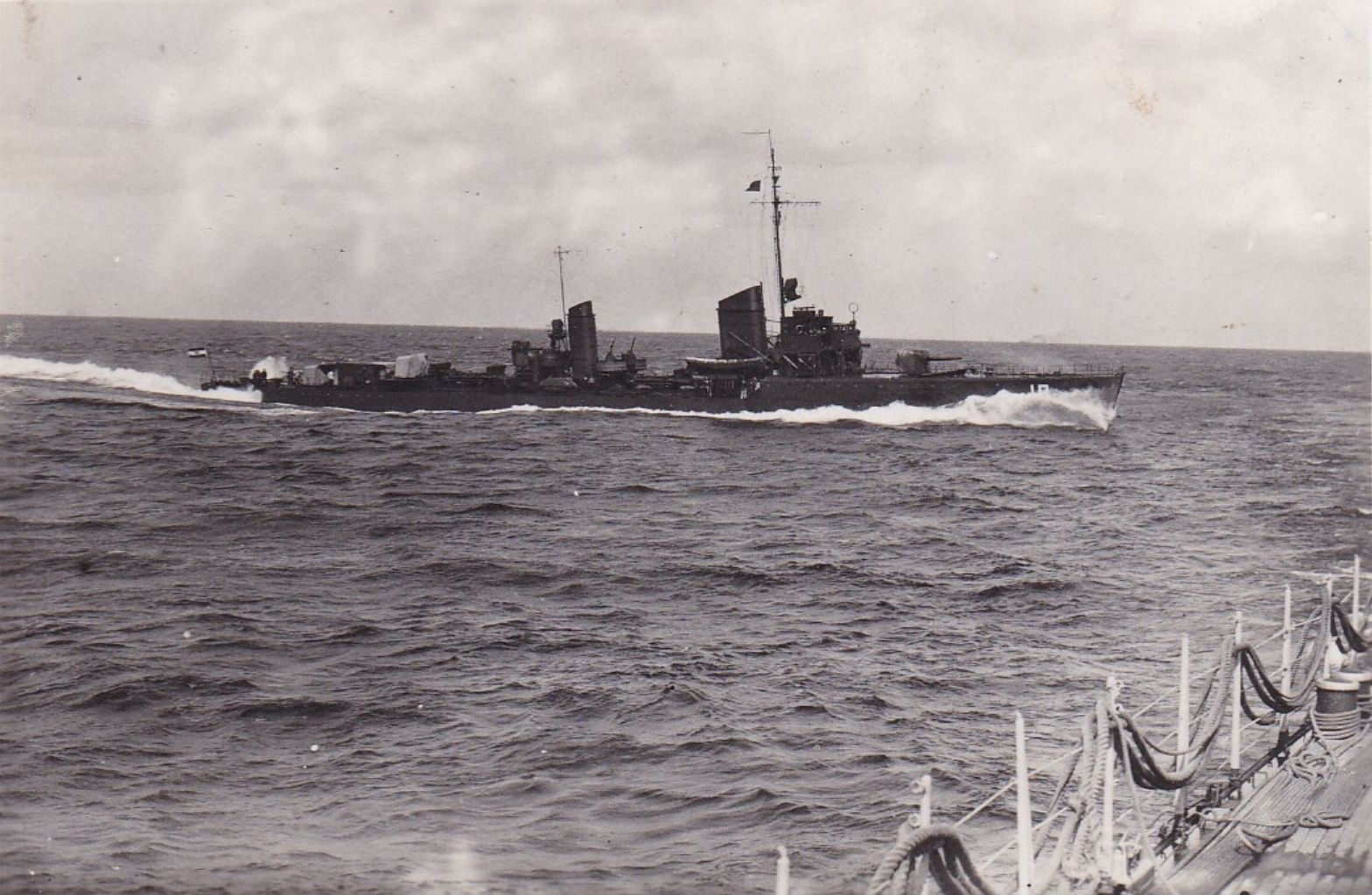
- Jaguar at sea, 1934–1935

History

Weimar Republic / Nazi Germany
- Name: Jaguar
- Namesake: Jaguar
- Builder: Reichsmarinewerft Wilhelmshaven
- Yard number: 113
- Laid down: 4 May 1927
- Launched: 15 March 1928
- Commissioned: 15 August 1929
- Fate: Bombed, 14 June 1944

General characteristics (as built)
- Class & type: Type 24 torpedo boat
- Displacement: 932 long tons (947 t) (standard); 1,319 long tons (1,340 t) (deep load)
- Length: 92.6 m (303 ft 10 in) (o/a)
- Beam: 8.65 m (28 ft 5 in)
- Draft: 3.52 m (11 ft 7 in)
- Installed power: 3 × water-tube boilers; 23,000 shp (17,000 kW)
- Propulsion: 2 × shafts; 2 × geared steam turbine sets
- Speed: 34 knots (63 km/h; 39 mph)
- Range: 1,997 nmi (3,698 km; 2,298 mi) at 17 knots (31 km/h; 20 mph)
- Complement: 129
- Armament: 3 × single 10.5 cm (4.1 in) guns; 2 × triple 500 mm (19.7 in) torpedo tubes; 30 mines

Service record
- Commanders: Karl Smidt; Klaus Scholtz; Werner Hartenstein

Jaguar was the sixth and last Type 24 torpedo boat built for the German Navy (initially called the Reichsmarine and then renamed as the Kriegsmarine in 1935) during the 1920s. The boat made multiple non-intervention patrols during the Spanish Civil War in the late 1930s. During World War II, she played a minor role in the Norwegian Campaign of 1940. Jaguar spent the next several months escorting minelayers as they laid minefields and damaged heavy ships back to Germany before she was transferred to France around September. She started laying minefields herself that month and continued to do so for the rest of the war. After a refit in early 1941, the boat was transferred to the Skaggerak where she was assigned escort duties. Jaguar returned to France in 1942 and was one of the escorts for the capital ships sailing from France to Germany through the English Channel in the Channel Dash. She helped to escort blockade runners, commerce raiders and submarines through the Channel and the Bay of Biscay, as well as Norwegian waters, for the next several years. The boat attacked Allied ships during the Invasion of Normandy in June 1944, but was sunk by British bombers that same month.

== Design and armament ==
Derived from the preceding Type 23 torpedo boat, the Type 24 was slightly larger and faster, but had a similar armament. The boats had an overall length of 92.6 meters (303 ft 10 in) and were 89 meters (292 ft) long at the waterline. They had a beam of 8.65 meters (28 ft 5 in), and a mean draft of 3.52 meters (11 ft 7 in). The Type 24s displaced 932 long tons (947 t) at standard load and 1,319 long tons (1,340 t) at deep load. A pair of Brown-Boveri geared steam turbine sets, each driving one propeller, were designed to produce 23,000 metric horsepower (17,000 kW; 23,000 shp) using steam from three water-tube boilers which would propel the ship at 34 knots (63 km/h; 39 mph). The boats carried enough fuel oil to give them a range of 1,997 nmi (3,698 km; 2,298 mi) at 17 knots (31 km/h; 20 mph). Their crew numbered 129 officers and sailors.

As built, the Type 24s mounted three 10.5 cm (4.1 in) SK C/28 (Note: In Kriegsmarine gun nomenclature, SK stands for Schiffskanone (ship's gun), C/30 stands for Constructionjahr (construction year) 1930.) guns, one forward and two aft of the superstructure, numbered one through three from bow to stern. They carried six above-water 50 cm (19.7 in) torpedo tubes in two triple mounts amidships and could also carry up to 30 mines. After 1931, the torpedo tubes were replaced by 533 mm (21 in) tubes and a pair of 2 cm (0.8 in) C/30 anti-aircraft guns were added. During the war a quadruple 2 cm mount was added just forward of No. 2 gun, three 2 cm guns were positioned around the aft funnel, another pair were mounted on the bridge wings, and a gun was added in front of the bridge, all in single mounts. Around 1944 a FuMB 4 Sumatra radar detector was installed as was radar.

== Construction and career ==
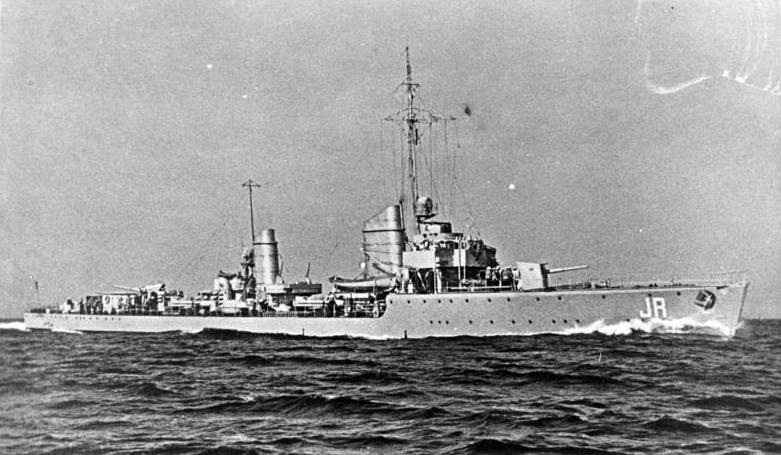
Jaguar underway, 1934

Jaguar was laid down at the Reichsmarinewerft Wilhelmshaven (Navy Yard) on 4 May 1927 as yard number 113, launched on 15 March 1928 and commissioned on 15 August 1929. The boat was initially assigned to the 3rd Torpedo Boat Half-Flotilla and by the end of 1936 she was assigned to the 3rd Torpedo Boat Flotilla. She made several deployments to Spain during the Spanish Civil War.

Together with the torpedo boat Falke, Jaguar impounded six ships in the Skaggerak during an anti-contraband patrol in 14–16 December 1939. She began a refit later that month at Wesermünde that lasted until March 1940. During the Norwegian Campaign, Jaguar and Falke, among other ships, briefly rendered assistance to the torpedoed heavy cruiser Lützow before continuing onwards to Kristiansand on 11 April with reinforcements. On 4–5 June Falke and Jaguar provided the anti-submarine screen from Kiel, Germany, to the Skaggerak for an unsuccessful attempt by the battleships Gneisenau and Scharnhorst and the heavy cruiser Admiral Hipper to intercept the Allied convoys evacuating troops from Northern Norway. From 21–23 June, Jaguar was one of the escorts for the badly damaged Scharnhorst from Norway to Kiel.

Now assigned to the 5th Torpedo Boat Flotilla, Jaguar, and the torpedo boats Kondor, Falke, T2, T7 and T8 escorted minelayers as they laid a minefield in the southwestern North Sea on 7–8 August. The flotilla escorted other minelaying missions in the same area on 14–15 August, 31 August – 2 September and 6–7 September. Reinforced by her sister ship Wolf, the flotilla made an unsuccessful sortie off the Isle of Wight on 8–9 October. Jaguar and her sister Iltis laid a minefield off Dover on 29–30 October and then again on 2–3 December.

Jaguar and Iltis laid a minefield off Eastbourne on 25–26 February and then again on 5–6 March. The pair escorted Scharnhorst and Gneisenau into Brest, France on 22 March after their North Atlantic raid. Jaguar began a refit the following month in Rotterdam, Netherlands, that lasted until May. She was transferred afterwards to the Skagerrak where she was on convoy escort duties until October. The ship rejoined the 5th Flotilla in France by February 1942. The flotilla joined the escort force for Scharnhorst, Gneisenau and the heavy cruiser Prinz Eugen on 12 February off Cap Gris-Nez during the Channel Dash. From 12 March to 2 April, the flotilla escorted the commerce raider Michel through the Channel despite heavy British attacks, damaging the British destroyers HMS Walpole and Fernie. In September and October, Jaguar was one of the escorts for German blockade runners sailing from ports in the Bay of Biscay en route to Japan.

On 11 March 1943, Jaguar and the torpedo boat Greif were among the escorts for the battleships Tirpitz and Scharnhorst as they moved from Trondheim, Norway, to Bogen Bay, and continued onward to Altafjord with Lützow and the light cruiser Nürnberg from 22 to 24 March. Jaguar, Greif, and the destroyer Z4 Richard Beitzen screened Nürnberg from Harstad to Trondheim and then to Kiel between 27 April and 3 May. On 3–7 May, Jaguar, Greif, and the torpedo boat Möwe escorted minelayers in the North Sea as they laid new minefields. In June the boats returned to the Bay of Biscay to help escort U-boats through the Bay and continued to do so into early August.

The 4th and 5th Torpedo Boat Flotillas, consisting of Jaguar, Möwe, Greif, Kondor, and the torpedo boats T27 and T29 laid minefields off Le Havre and Fécamp, France, on 21 and 22 March 1944. The flotilla was ordered to transfer from Cherbourg to Le Havre and departed on the night of 23/24 May. Jaguar, Greif, Falke, Kondor and Möwe were attacked by Allied aircraft early the next day and Greif was struck by two bombs and later sank. As the Allies began landing in Normandy on 6 June, the 5th Flotilla, now consisting of Jaguar, Falke, Möwe and T28, sortied multiple times from Le Havre over the next week in attempts to sink Allied shipping. Despite the expenditure of over 50 torpedoes and large quantities of ammunition, they were generally unsuccessful, only sinking the destroyer HNoMS Svenner on 6 June. During an air raid by heavy bombers of RAF Bomber Command on the night of 14/15 June against the harbour and the German warships there, Jaguar and Falke were sunk by bombs.
