= German torpedo boat Möwe =

1926 Type 23 torpedo boat

Möwe
- Right elevation and plan of the Type 23

History

Germany
- Name: Möwe
- Namesake: Seagull
- Builder: Reichsmarinewerft Wilhelmshaven
- Yard number: 102
- Laid down: 2 March 1925
- Launched: 24 March 1926
- Commissioned: 1 October 1926
- Fate: Sunk, 16 June 1944

General characteristics (as built)
- Class & type: Type 23 torpedo boat
- Displacement: 798 long tons (811 t) (standard); 1,213 long tons (1,232 t) (deep load)
- Length: 87.7 m (287 ft 9 in) (o/a)
- Beam: 8.25 m (27 ft 1 in)
- Draft: 3.65 m (12 ft)
- Installed power: 3 × water-tube boilers; 23,000 shp (17,000 kW)
- Propulsion: 2 × shafts; 2 × geared steam turbine sets
- Speed: 32–34 knots (59–63 km/h; 37–39 mph)
- Range: 1,800 nmi (3,300 km; 2,100 mi) at 17 knots (31 km/h; 20 mph)
- Complement: 120
- Armament: 3 × single 10.5 cm (4.1 in) guns; 2 × triple 500 mm (19.7 in) torpedo tubes; 30 mines

Möwe was the lead ship of her class of six torpedo boats built for the German Navy (initially called the Reichsmarine and then renamed as the Kriegsmarine in 1935). The boat made multiple non-intervention patrols during the Spanish Civil War in the late 1930s. During the Norwegian Campaign of 1940, she played a minor role in the attack on Oslo, the capital of Norway. Möwe was torpedoed and badly damaged by a British submarine in May and did not return to active service until 1942 when she was transferred to France. The boat helped to escort blockade runners, commerce raiders and submarines through the Bay of Biscay. She also laid numerous minefields and attacked Allied ships during the Invasion of Normandy in June 1944. Möwe was sunk by British bombers that same month.

== Design and armament ==
Derived from the World War I-era large torpedo boat SMS H145, (Note: "SMS" stands for "Seiner Majestät Schiff" (German: His Majesty's Ship).) the Type 23 torpedo boat was slightly larger, but had a similar armament and speed. The first ship to be built, Möwe was slightly smaller than her sister ships and had an overall length of 87 meters (285 ft 5 in) and was 84.7 meters (277 ft 11 in) long at the waterline because she had a round, cruiser-style, stern rather than the transom stern of her sisters. She had a beam of 8.25 meters (27 ft 1 in), and a mean draft of 3.65 meters (12 ft). The boat displaced 798 long tons (811 t) at standard load and 1,213 long tons (1,232 t) at deep load. Möwe was fitted with a pair of Blohm & Voss geared steam turbine sets, each driving one propeller, that were designed to produce 23,000 shaft horsepower (17,000 kW) using steam from three water-tube boilers which would propel the ship at 33 knots (61 km/h; 38 mph). The torpedo boats carried enough fuel oil to give them an intended range of 3,600 nautical miles (6,700 km; 4,100 mi) at 17 knots (31 km/h; 20 mph), but it proved to be only 1,800 nmi (3,300 km; 2,100 mi) at that speed in service. Their crew consisted of 4 officers and 116 sailors.

As built, the Type 23s mounted three 10.5 cm (4.1 in) SK L/45 (Note: In Imperial German Navy gun nomenclature, "SK" (Schnelladekanone) denotes that the gun is quick firing, while the L/45 denotes the length of the gun. In this case, the L/45 gun is 45 caliber, meaning that the gun is 45 times as long as it is in diameter.) guns, one forward and two aft of the superstructure; the aft superfiring gun was on an open mount while the others were protected by gun shields. They carried six above-water 50 cm (19.7 in) torpedo tubes in two triple mounts and could also carry up to 30 mines. After 1931, the torpedo tubes were replaced by 533-millimeter (21 in) tubes and a pair of 2-centimeter (0.8 in) C/30 (Note: In Kriegsmarine gun nomenclature, SK stands for Schiffskanone (ship's gun), C/30 stands for Constructionjahr (construction year) 1930.) anti-aircraft guns were added. During the war a quadruple 2 cm mount was added just forward of No. 2 gun, three 2 cm guns were positioned around the aft funnel and another pair were mounted on the bridge wings, all in single mounts. Around 1944 a FuMB 4 Sumatra radar detector was installed as was radar.

== Construction and career ==
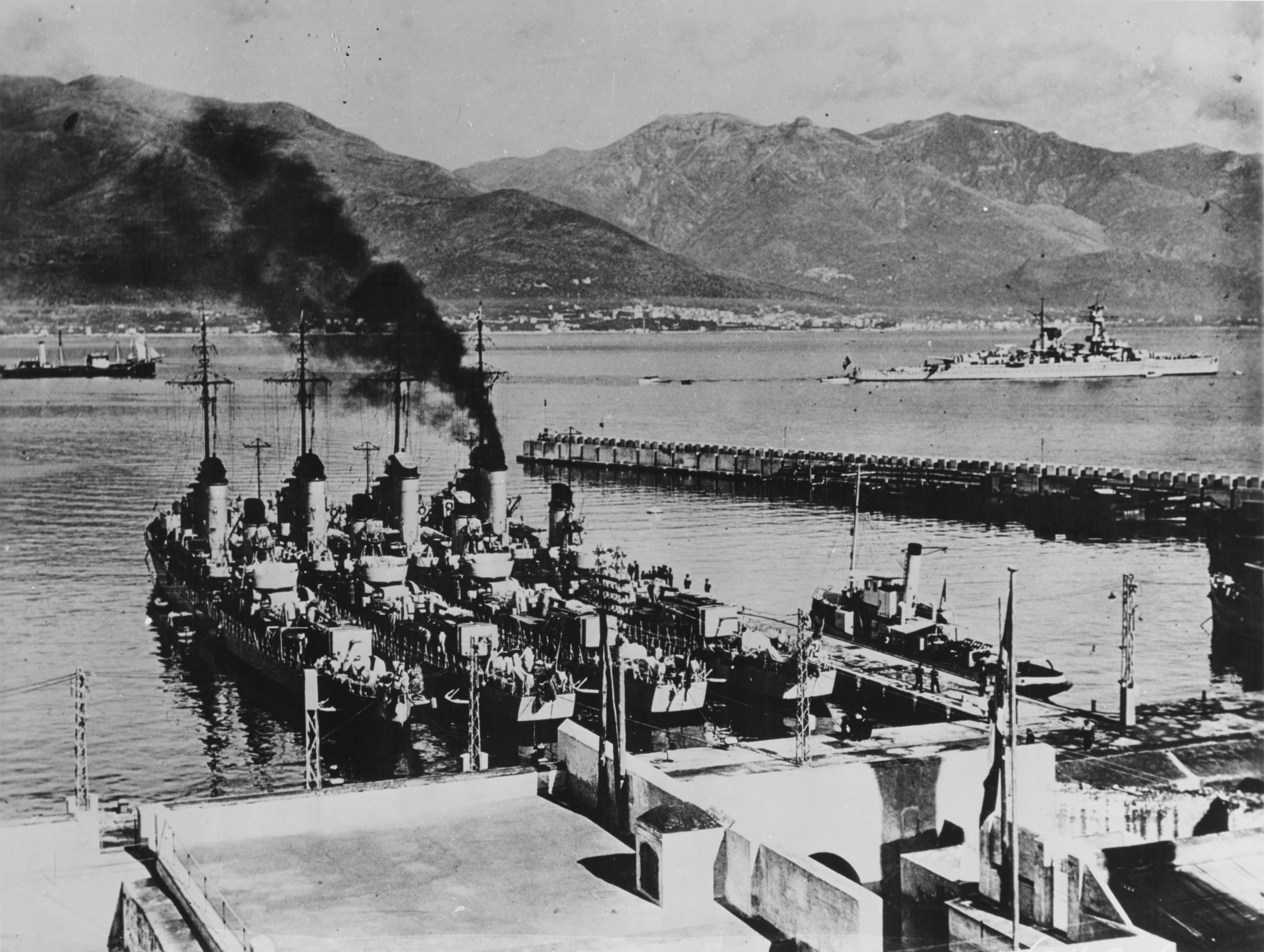
Four Type 23 boats docked in Naples, Italy, in 1938. Möwe (the leftmost boat) can be recognized by her rounded stern. The heavy cruiser Deutschland is leaving port in the right background.

Named after the seagull, the boat was laid down at the Reichsmarinewerft Wilhelmshaven (Navy Yard) on 2 March 1925 as yard number 102. She was launched on 24 March 1926 and commissioned on 1 October 1926. The boat was initially assigned to the 4th Torpedo Boat Half Flotilla. By the end of 1936 Möwe was assigned to the 4th Torpedo Boat Flotilla and the boat made several deployments to Spain during the Spanish Civil War. Around June 1938, she was transferred to the newly formed 5th Torpedo Boat Flotilla.

=== Second World War ===
Map of operations in Oslofjord on the night of 8/9 April, showing how far the Germans had progressed at various times as well as their movements

Möwe supported the North Sea mining operations that began on 3 September 1939. During the Norwegian Campaign, the boat was assigned to Group 5 under Konteradmiral Oskar Kummetz on the heavy cruiser Blücher, tasked to capture Oslo on 9 April. Möwe transported 114 men of the invasion force and was one of the cruiser's escorts through the Kattegat and into Oslofjord. During the Battle of Drøbak Sound, the boat was in the rear of the German formation as it advanced up the fjord. After the Norwegian coast defenses crippled Blücher as she attempted to pass Oscarsborg Fortress, she was ordered to unload her troops at Son. Around 17:30 Möwe and her sister Kondor supported the occupation of Kopås and Husvik batteries near Drøbak. A little over an hour later, Möwe approached the main fort under a flag of truce, and her commander, Kapitänleutnant (Lieutenant) Helmut Neuss, demanded that it surrender; the fort's commander, Oberst (Colonel) Birger Eriksen, dragged out the negotiations until a more senior officer was sent. The next day, the torpedo boat escorted the heavy cruiser Lützow through the Oslofjord until word was received that her sister Albatros had run aground and been wrecked. Möwe was ordered to replace Albatros in the outer reaches of the Oslofjord. Lützow continued on to Germany without any escort and was torpedoed by a British submarine later that night off the Danish coast. Möwe and Kondor, among other ships, arrived the following morning to render assistance.

On 18 April, Möwe and her sisters Greif and Seeadler escorted minelayers as they laid anti-submarine minefields in the Kattegat. Escorted by two destroyers, Möwe, Kondor and the torpedo boat Wolf, minelayers laid another minefield in the Skaggerak on 29–30 April. En route, the torpedo boat Leopard was sunk when she was accidentally rammed by the minelayer Preussen. The following month, she was torpedoed by the British submarine HMS Taku on 8 May. The torpedo blew her stern off and she was under repair until October. Her stern was rebuilt in the same transom style used by her sisters. Möwe was not fully operational until early 1942 and was transferred to France in May of that year. In September–October, Möwe was one of the escorts for German blockade runners sailing from ports in the Bay of Biscay en route to Japan. On 3–7 May 1943, Möwe and Greif escorted minelayers in the North Sea as they laid new minefields. From 4 to 6 June, Möwe, Greif, Kondor, her sister Falke and the torpedo boat T22 laid two minefields in the English Channel. Later that month the ships return to the Bay of Biscay to help escort U-boats through the Bay and continue to do so into early August. Möwe and Kondor helped to lay two minefields in the English Channel on 3–5 September.

The 4th and 5th Torpedo Boat Flotillas, consisting Möwe, Greif, Kondor, and the torpedo boats Jaguar, T27, and T29 laid minefields off Le Havre and Fécamp, France, on 21 and 22 March. On 17–19 April, the 5th Torpedo Boat Flotilla, including Möwe, Greif and Kondor sailed from Brest, France, to Cherbourg as distant cover for a convoy. A few days later, the flotilla laid a minefield on the night of 21/22 April. The following night the torpedo boats engaged British motor torpedo boats near Cape Barfleur and sank one of them. On the nights of 26/27 and 27/28 April, they laid 108 mines each night near Cherbourg. On 30 April and 1 May, the flotilla laid 260 mines in three minefields. Three weeks later, the flotilla was ordered to transfer from Cherbourg to Le Havre and departed on the night of 23/24 May. Möwe, Greif, Falke, Kondor and Jaguar were attacked by Allied aircraft early the next day and Greif was struck by two bombs that set her forward boiler room on fire and caused her to take on water forward. With both boiler rooms subsequently flooded, she was unmaneuverable and accidentally collided with Falke. The latter was only slightly damaged, but Greif's bow was badly bent which caused problems for Möwe when she began to tow her sister. Around 06:00 Greif lost all power and sank at 06:32. At 07:43 Kondor struck a mine and had to be towed by Möwe for the remainder of the voyage.

As the Allies began landing in Normandy on 6 June, the 5th Flotilla, now consisting of Möwe, Falke, Jaguar and the newly refitted large torpedo boat T28, sortied multiple times from Le Havre over the next week in attempts to sink Allied shipping. Despite the expenditure of over 50 torpedoes and large quantities of ammunition, they were generally unsuccessful, only sinking the destroyer HNoMS Svenner on 6 June. During an air raid by the Royal Air Force on the night of 14/15 June, bombs sank Falke and Jaguar and badly damaged Möwe. She finally sank on 16 June after some weapons and equipment had been salvaged.

== Bibliography ==
- Campbell, John (1985). Naval Weapons of World War II. Annapolis, Maryland: Naval Institute Press. ISBN 978-0-87021-459-2.
- Friedman, Norman (2011). Naval Weapons of World War One: Guns, Torpedoes, Mines and ASW Weapons of All Nations; An Illustrated Directory. Barnsley, UK: Seaforth Publishing. ISBN 978-1-84832-100-7.
- Gröner, Erich (1990). German Warships 1815–1945. Vol. 1: Major Surface Warships. Annapolis, Maryland: Naval Institute Press. ISBN 0-87021-790-9.
- Haarr, Geirr H. (2009). The German Invasion of Norway, April 1940. Annapolis, Maryland: Naval Institute Press. ISBN 978-1-59114-310-9.
- Rohwer, Jürgen (2005). Chronology of the War at Sea 1939–1945: The Naval History of World War Two (Third Revised ed.). Annapolis, Maryland: Naval Institute Press. ISBN 1-59114-119-2.
- Sieche, Erwin (1980). "Germany". In Chesneau, Roger (ed.). Conway's All the World's Fighting Ships 1922–1946. London: Conway Maritime Press. ISBN 0-85177-146-7.
- Whitley, M. J. (2000). Destroyers of World War Two: An International Encyclopedia. London: Cassell & Co. ISBN 1-85409-521-8.
- Whitley, M. J. (1991). German Destroyers of World War Two. Annapolis, Maryland: Naval Institute Press. ISBN 1-55750-302-8.
