= German torpedo boat Tiger (1928) =

Tiger
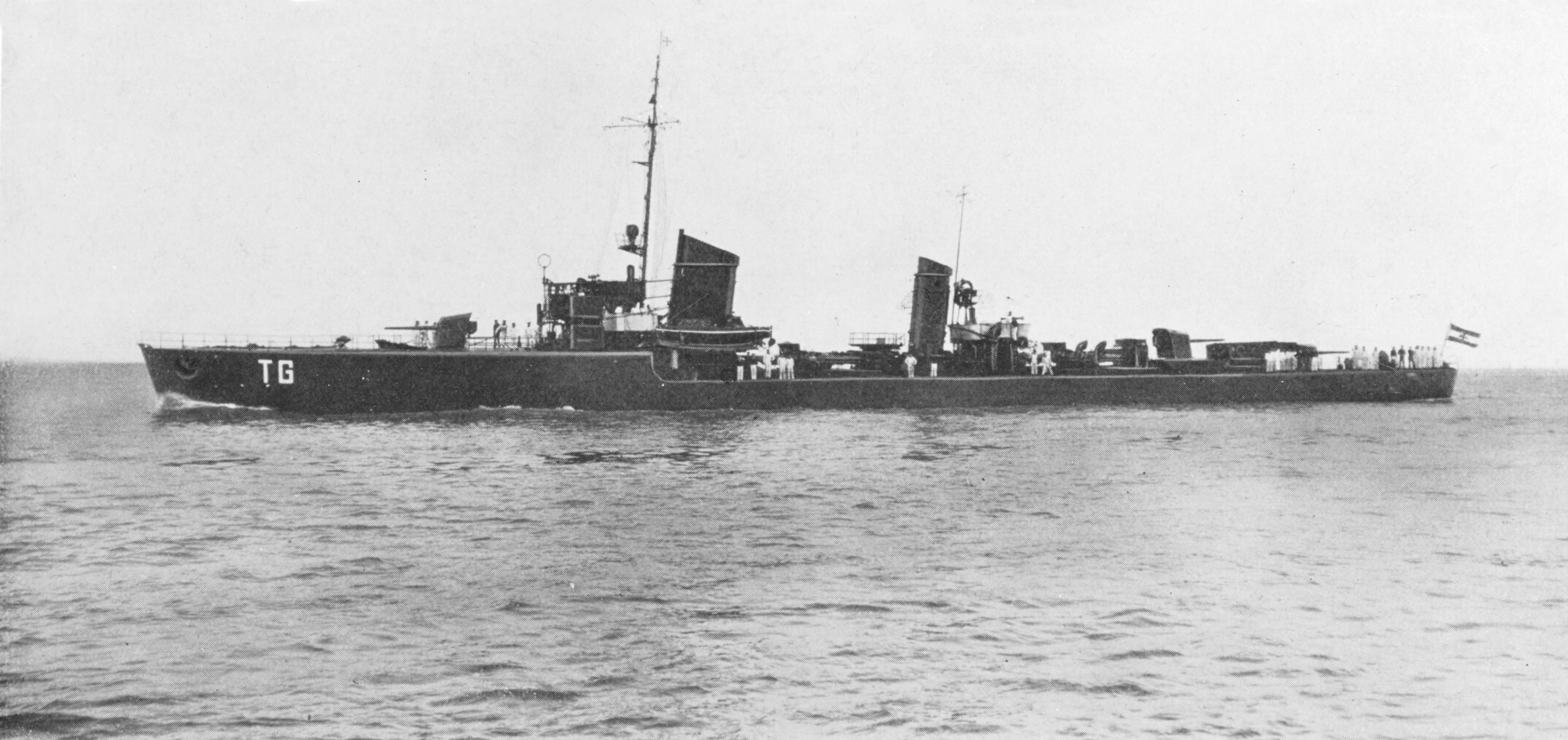
- Tiger, underway about 1930

History

Germany
- Name: Tiger
- Namesake: Tiger
- Builder: Reichsmarinewerft Wilhelmshaven
- Yard number: 112
- Laid down: 2 April 1927
- Launched: 15 March 1928
- Commissioned: 15 January 1929
- Fate: Sunk in a collision, 27 August 1939

General characteristics (as built)
- Class & type: Type 24 torpedo boat
- Displacement: 932 long tons (947 t) (standard); 1,319 long tons (1,340 t) (deep load)
- Length: 92.6 m (303 ft 10 in) (o/a)
- Beam: 8.65 m (28 ft 5 in)
- Draft: 3.52 m (11 ft 7 in)
- Installed power: 3 × water-tube boilers; 23,000 shp (17,000 kW)
- Propulsion: 2 × shafts; 2 × geared steam turbine sets
- Speed: 34 knots (63 km/h; 39 mph)
- Range: 1,997 nmi (3,698 km; 2,298 mi) at 17 knots (31 km/h; 20 mph)
- Complement: 129
- Armament: 3 × single 10.5 cm (4.1 in) guns; 2 × triple 500 mm (19.7 in) torpedo tubes; 30 mines

Tiger was the third of six Type 24 torpedo boats built for the German Navy (initially called the Reichsmarine and then renamed as the Kriegsmarine in 1935) during the 1920s. The boat made multiple non-intervention patrols during the Spanish Civil War in the late 1930s. Tiger was sunk by a German destroyer in August 1939 which accidentally rammed her during night training.

== Design and armament ==
Derived from the preceding Type 23 torpedo boat, the Type 24 was slightly larger and faster, but had a similar armament. The boats had an overall length of 92.6 meters (303 ft 10 in) and were 89 meters (292 ft) long at the waterline. They had a beam of 8.65 meters (28 ft 5 in), and a mean draft of 3.52 meters (11 ft 7 in). The Type 24s displaced 932 long tons (947 t) at standard load and 1,319 long tons (1,340 t) at deep load. Wolf's pair of Brown-Boveri geared steam turbine sets, each driving one propeller, were designed to produce 23,000 metric horsepower (17,000 kW; 23,000 shp) using steam from three water-tube boilers which would propel the ship at 34 knots (63 km/h; 39 mph). The boats carried enough fuel oil to give them a range of 1,997 nmi (3,698 km; 2,298 mi) at 17 knots (31 km/h; 20 mph). Their crew numbered 129 officers and sailors.

As built, the Type 24s mounted three 10.5 cm (4.1 in) SK C/28 (Note: In Kriegsmarine gun nomenclature, SK stands for Schiffskanone (ship's gun), C/30 stands for Constructionjahr (construction year) 1930.) guns, one forward and two aft of the superstructure, numbered one through three from bow to stern. They carried six above-water 50 cm (19.7 in) torpedo tubes in two triple mounts amidships and could also carry up to 30 mines. After 1931, the torpedo tubes were replaced by 533 mm (21 in) tubes and a pair of 2 cm (0.8 in) C/30 anti-aircraft guns were added.

== Construction and career ==
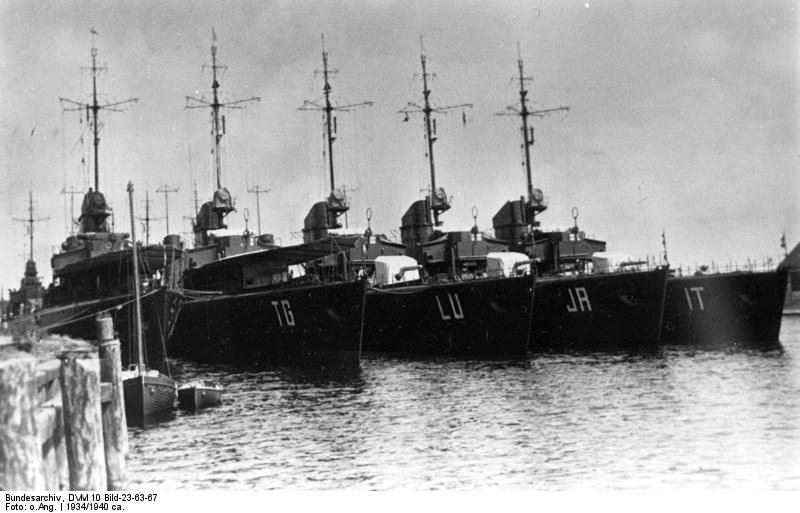
Tiger, Luchs, Jaguar and Iltis (from left to right) at anchor, 1934

Tiger was laid down at the Reichsmarinewerft Wilhelmshaven (Navy Yard) on 2 April 1927 as yard number 112, launched on 15 March 1928 and commissioned on 15 January 1929. The boat was initially assigned to the 3rd Torpedo Boat Half-Flotilla and by the end of 1936 she was assigned to the 2nd Torpedo Boat Flotilla. She made several deployments to Spain during the Spanish Civil War. Around June 1938, Tiger was transferred to the 3rd Torpedo Boat Flotilla which was renumbered the 6th Flotilla on 1 July.

Shortly before the German declaration of war on Poland on 1 September 1939, many of the Kriegsmarine's torpedo boats and destroyers were training in the Baltic Sea. At 02:34 on 27 August, the destroyer Z3 Max Schultz accidentally rammed the darkened Tiger, which sank at 03:13 with two men dead and six wounded. The survivors were rescued by the destroyer, which had her bow damaged, but suffered no casualties of her own.
