= Type 24 torpedo boat =

Class of torpedo boat

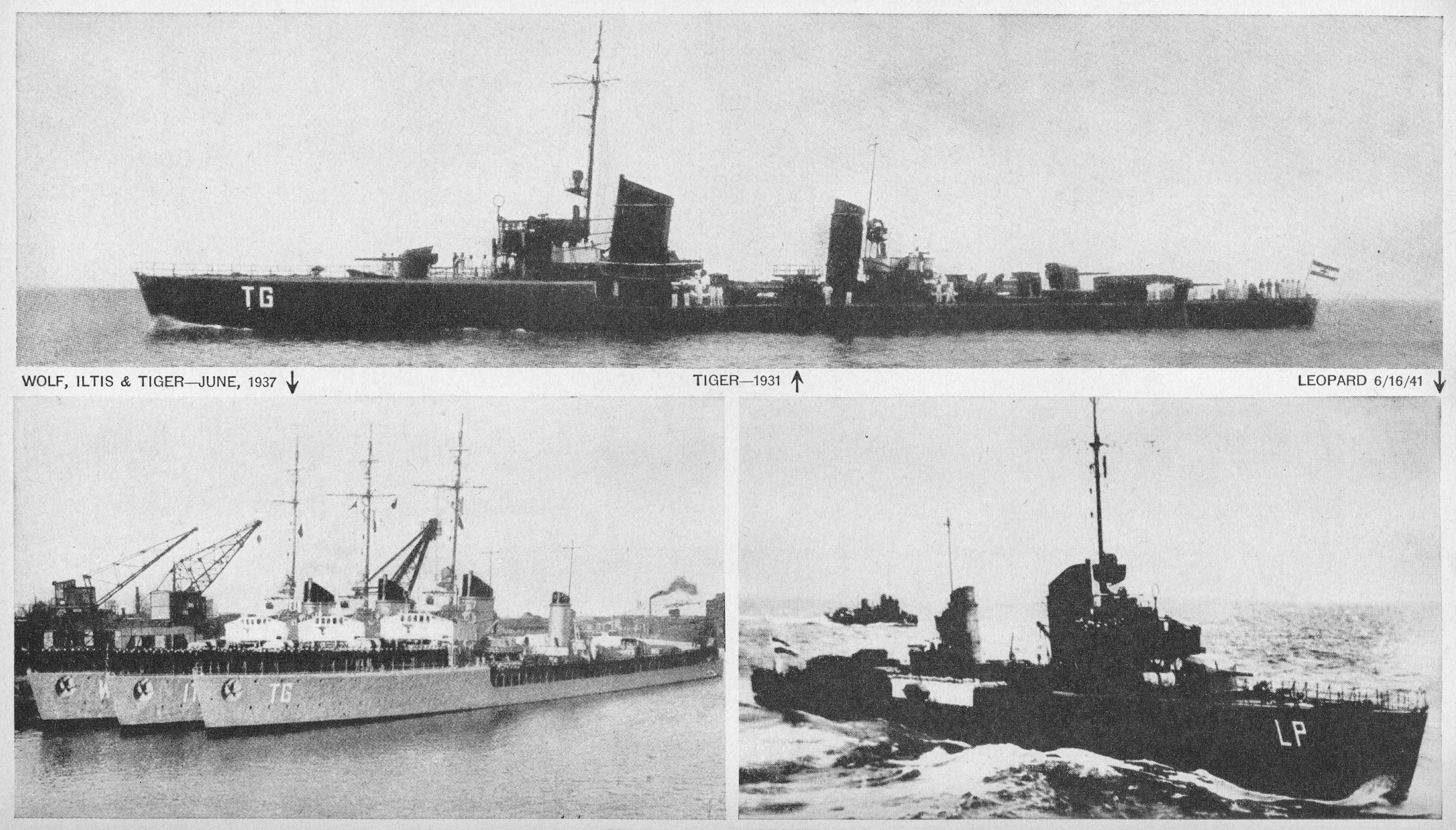
- Type 1924 (Raubtier-class) torpedo boats

Class overview
- Builders: Reichsmarinewerft Wilhelmshaven
- Operators: Reichsmarine; Kriegsmarine
- Preceded by: Type 23 torpedo boat
- Succeeded by: Type 35 torpedo boat
- Built: 1927–1929
- In commission: 1928–1944
- Completed: 6
- Lost: 6

General characteristics (as built)
- Type: Torpedo boat
- Displacement: 933 long tons (948 t) (standard); 1,320 long tons (1,340 t) (deep load)
- Length: 92.6 m (303 ft 10 in) o/a
- Beam: 8.65 m (28 ft 5 in)
- Draft: 3.52 m (11 ft 7 in)
- Installed power: 3 × water-tube boilers; 23,000 shp (17,000 kW)
- Propulsion: 2 × shafts; 2 × geared steam turbine sets
- Speed: 34 knots (63 km/h; 39 mph)
- Range: 1,997 nmi (3,698 km; 2,298 mi) at 17 knots (31 km/h; 20 mph)
- Complement: 127
- Armament: 3 × single 10.5 cm (4.1 in) guns; 2 × triple 500 mm (19.7 in) torpedo tubes; 30 mines

The Type 24 torpedo boat (also known as the (German: Raubtier (Carnivore) class) was a group of six torpedo boats built for the Reichsmarine during the 1920s. As part of the renamed Kriegsmarine, the boats made multiple non-intervention patrols during the Spanish Civil War in the late 1930s. One was sunk in an accidental collision shortly before the start of World War II in September 1939 and the others escorted ships and searched for contraband for several months of the war. They played a minor role in the Norwegian Campaign of April 1940 and resumed their escort duties. After being transferred to France late in the year, the Type 24s started laying their own minefields in the English Channel.

The surviving boats were refitted in early 1941 and were then transferred to the Skaggerak for escort duties. By the beginning of 1942 there were only two survivors and they were transferred back to France to participate in the Channel Dash. Another boat was lost a few months later trying to escort a commerce raider through the Channel in May. The last surviving boat, Jaguar, spent the next several years laying minefields, escorting blockade runners and U-boats through the Bay of Biscay and convoys in Norwegian waters. Shortly after the Allied invasion of Normandy in June 1944, she was sunk by British bombers.

== Design and description ==
The Type 24 torpedo boat was slightly larger than the preceding Type 23 and had some incremental improvements based on experience with the Type 23s. The boats had a lot of weather helm so that they were "almost impossible to hold on course in wind and at low speed". The design has been criticized for being equipped with too many torpedoes for the role that they were actually used during World War II.

The boats had an overall length of 92.6 meters (303 ft 10 in) and were 89 meters (292 ft 0 in) long at the waterline. They had a beam of 8.65 meters (28 ft 5 in), a mean draft of 3.52 meters (11 ft 7 in) and displaced 932 long tons (947 t) at standard load and 1,319 long tons (1,340 t) at deep load. Their hull was divided into 13 watertight compartments and it was fitted with a double bottom that covered 96% of their length. Their crew numbered 129 officers and sailors.

The Type 24s had two sets of turbines, each driving a single three-bladed 2.35-meter (7 ft 9 in) propeller, using steam provided by three water-tube boilers that operated at a pressure of 18.5 kg/cm^{2} (1,814 kPa; 263 psi). The turbines were designed to produce 23,000 metric horsepower (17,000 kW; 23,000 shp) for a speed of 34 knots (63 km/h; 39 mph). The ships carried a maximum of 338 metric tons (333 long tons) of fuel oil which was intended to give a range of 3,900 nautical miles (7,200 km; 4,500 mi) at 17 knots (31 km/h; 20 mph). The effective range proved to be only 1,997 nmi (3,698 km; 2,298 mi) at that speed.

=== Armament and sensors ===
As built, the Type 24s mounted three 52-caliber 10.5 cm (4.1 in) SK C/28 (Note: In Kriegsmarine gun nomenclature, SK stands for Schiffskanone (ship's gun), C/30 stands for Constructionjahr (construction year) 1930.) guns, one forward and two aft of the superstructure, numbered one through three from bow to stern. The mounts had a range of elevation from -10° to +30° and the guns fired 14.7-kilogram (32 lb) projectiles at a muzzle velocity of 925 m/s (3,030 ft/s). They had a range of 17,250 meters (18,860 yd) at maximum elevation. Some of these guns were altered to use the ammunition of the SK C/32 gun which weighed 15.1 kilograms (33 lb) and increased the muzzle velocity to 785 m/s (2,580 ft/s). The new ammunition had a maximum range of 15,175 meters (16,596 yd) at an elevation of 44.4°. The last surviving boat, Jaguar, retained her original gun until her loss in 1944. Each gun was provided with 100 shells. In 1932 Leopard and Luchs had their guns bored out to serve as prototypes of the 12.7-centimeter (5.0 in) SK C/34 guns prior to their use on the Type 1934-class destroyers.

Vessels of this class carried six above-water 50 cm (19.7 in) torpedo tubes in two triple mounts and could also carry up to 30 mines. After 1931, the torpedo tubes were replaced by 533-millimeter (21 in) tubes which probably used the G7a torpedo. This torpedo had a 300-kilogram (660 lb) warhead and three speed/range settings: 14,000 meters (15,000 yd) at 30 knots (56 km/h; 35 mph); 8,000 meters (8,700 yd) at 40 knots (74 km/h; 46 mph) and 6,000 meters (6,600 yd) at 44 knots (81 km/h; 51 mph).

A pair of 2-centimeter (0.8 in) C/30 anti-aircraft guns were also added after 1931. The gun had an effective rate of fire of about 120 rounds per minute. Its 0.12-kilogram (0.26 lb) projectiles were fired at a muzzle velocity of 875 m/s (2,870 ft/s) which gave it a ceiling of 3,700 meters (12,100 ft) and a maximum horizontal range of 4,800 meters (5,200 yd). Each boat carried 2,000 rounds per gun. Wartime additions were an extra pair of 2 cm guns in single mounts just forward of No. 2 gun. In late 1942 they were replaced by a quadruple 2 cm mount. Other guns that were added included three 2 cm guns positioned around the aft funnel, another pair mounted on the bridge wings, and a gun added in front of the bridge, all in single mounts. Around 1944 a FuMB 4 Sumatra radar detector was installed, as was radar.

== Ships ==
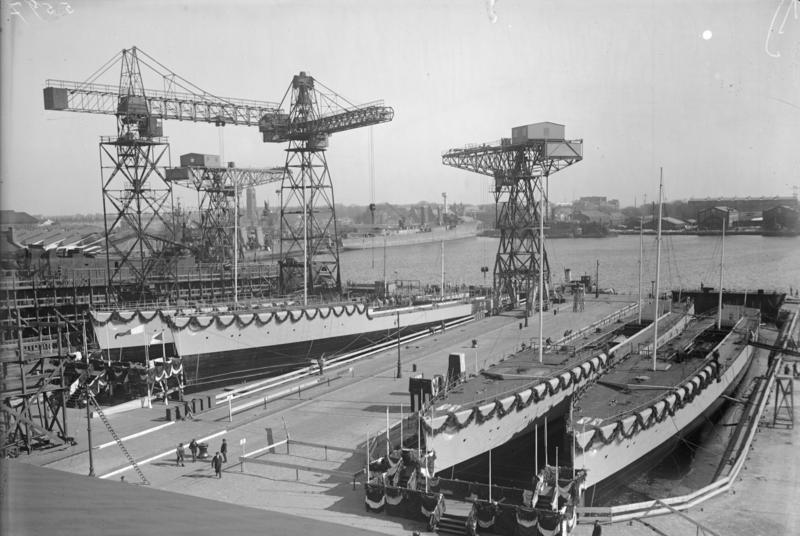
Tiger, Luchs, Jaguar, and Leopard at their launching ceremony

Construction data
Name	Builder	Laid down	Launched	Completed	Fate
Wolf	Reichsmarinewerft Wilhelmshaven, Wilhelmshaven	8 March 1927	12 October 1927	15 November 1928	Mined, 8 January 1941
Iltis (Polecat)	Reichsmarinewerft Wilhelmshaven, Wilhelmshaven	8 March 1927	12 October 1927	1 October 1928	Sunk by British MTBs during the action of 13 May 1942
Jaguar	Reichsmarinewerft Wilhelmshaven, Wilhelmshaven	4 May 1927	15 March 1928	15 August 1929	Bombed, 14 June 1944
Leopard	Reichsmarinewerft Wilhelmshaven, Wilhelmshaven	4 May 1927	15 March 1928	1 June 1929	Sunk in collision with the minelayer Preussen, 30 April 1940
Luchs (Lynx)	Reichsmarinewerft Wilhelmshaven, Wilhelmshaven	2 April 1927	15 March 1928	15 April 1929	Torpedoed by HMS Thames, 26 July 1940
Tiger	Reichsmarinewerft Wilhelmshaven, Wilhelmshaven	2 April 1927	15 March 1928	15 January 1929	Wrecked in collision with destroyer Z3 Max Schultz, 27 August 1939

== Service ==
Most of the boats were initially assigned to the 3rd Torpedo Boat Half Flotilla. By the end of 1936, the Kriegsmarine had reorganized its torpedo boats into flotillas with Leopard and Luchs in the 2nd Torpedo Boat Flotilla and Wolf, Iltis, Jaguar and Tiger were assigned to the 3rd Torpedo Boat Flotilla. Both flotillas made several deployments to Spain during the Spanish Civil War. Around June 1938, the flotillas were again reorganized with Leopard and Luchs transferred to the 4th Torpedo Boat Flotilla. The other boats were either refitting or in reserve. On 1 July the 3rd Flotilla was renumbered as the 6th. Shortly before the German declaration of war on Poland on 1 September 1939, Tiger was sunk by a German destroyer which accidentally rammed her during night training.

=== World War II ===
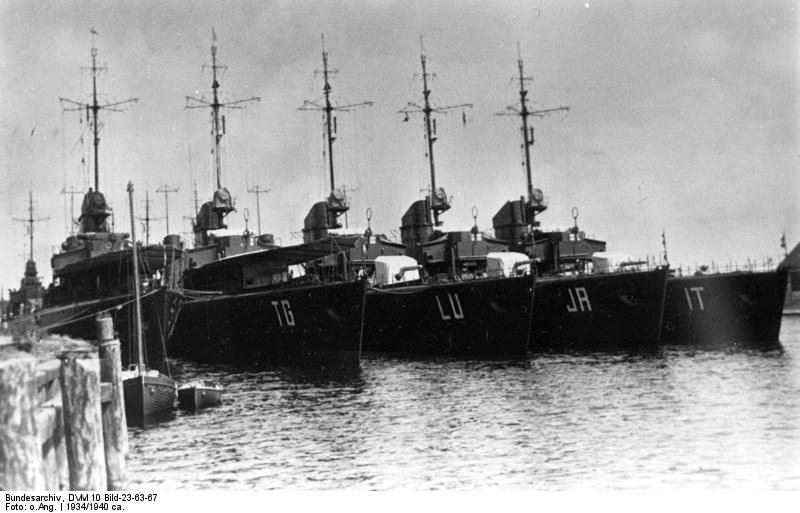
Tiger (TG), Luchs (LU), Jaguar (JA) and Iltis (IT) at anchor, c. 1934

At the beginning the 4th Flotilla was disbanded and boats were transferred to the 5th and 6th Torpedo Boat Flotillas. All of the Type 24s supported the North Sea mining operations that began on 3 September 1939, except Jaguar. On 13, 18 and 19 November, the 6th Flotilla and one or two light cruisers met destroyers returning from minelaying missions of the English coast. Two days later the flotilla patrolled the Skagerrak to inspect neutral shipping for contraband goods before returning to port on the 25th. From 14 to 16 December, Jaguar and the torpedo boat Seeadler made contraband patrols in the Skaggerak, impounding six ships.

Iltis was refitting, but all the other Type 24s played a minor role in the invasion of Norway in April 1940. Leopard and Wolf were assigned to support the attack on Bergen while Luchs, was tasked to help capture Kristiansand. Jaguar ferried reinforcements to Kristiansand. As the heavy cruiser Lützow was proceeding to Germany without an escort two days later, she too was crippled by a British submarine off the Danish coast and all five boats responded to render assistance. While escorting a group of minelayers returning from laying a minefield in the Skaggerak on 30 April with Wolf, Leopard was sunk when she was accidentally rammed by one of the minelayers.

The 6th Flotilla was disbanded in April and all the torpedo boats were consolidated in the 5th Flotilla which continued to escort minelayers and damaged ships between Norway and Germany for the next several months. During one of these missions, Luchs was sunk by either a submarine or a floating mine on 26 July. The flotilla escorted minelaying missions in the North Sea in August and September before transferring to the English Channel in October. The first sortie in search of Allied shipping was unsuccessful, but another on 11–12 October sank four small ships. The flotilla's boats now started laying minefields themselves over the rest of the year and into early 1941. Wolf was sunk on one such mission on 8 January when she struck a mine herself.

Iltis and Jaguar were now the only surviving boats of the class and they continued lay minefields and escorted two battleships through the Bay of Biscay on 22 March after their North Atlantic raid. The sisters began refits the next month and were then transferred to the Skagerrak where they were on convoy escort duties until October. They were transferred to France in January 1942, rejoining the 5th Flotilla and were some of the escorts through the Channel for two battleships and a heavy cruiser during the Channel Dash in February. Both boats helped to screen a commerce raider through the Channel in March, but Iltis was sunk on 13 May when trying to escort another one. This left Jaguar as the sole surviving boat and she remained in France for the rest of the year, helping to escort German blockade runners sailing from ports in the Bay of Biscay en route to Japan.

She was transferred to Norwegian waters for escort work in early 1943, but returned to France midway through the year to help escort U-boats through the Bay of Biscay and continued to do so into early August. The boat helped to lay a minefield in the Channel in March 1944. As the Allies began landing in Normandy on 6 June, the 5th Flotilla sortied several times from Le Havre over the next week in attempts to sink Allied shipping. They were generally unsuccessful, only sinking a single destroyer on 6 June. Jaguar was sunk during an air raid by the Royal Air Force on the night of 14/15 June.
