= German torpedo boat Luchs =

German Naval Ship

Luchs
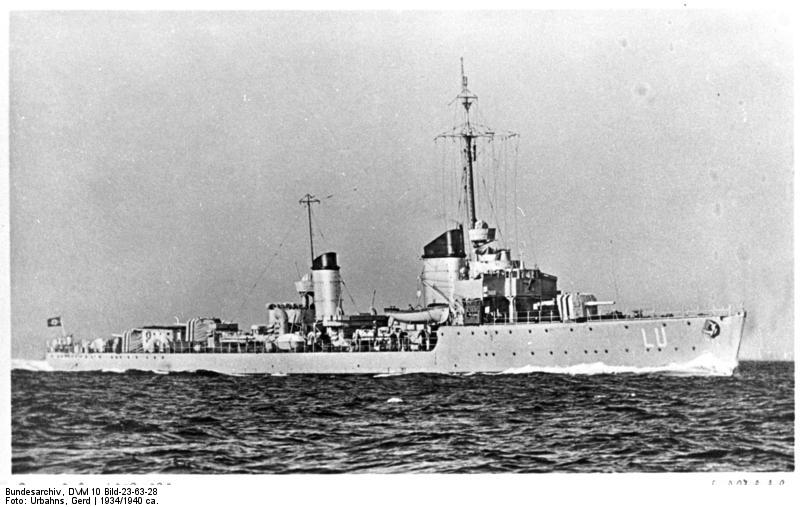
- Luchs underway, 1934

History

Germany
- Name: Luchs
- Namesake: Lynx
- Builder: Reichsmarinewerft Wilhelmshaven
- Yard number: 111
- Laid down: 2 April 1927
- Launched: 15 March 1928
- Commissioned: 15 April 1929
- Fate: Torpedoed, 26 July 1940

General characteristics (as built)
- Class & type: Type 24 torpedo boat
- Displacement: 932 long tons (947 t) (standard); 1,319 long tons (1,340 t) (deep load)
- Length: 92.6 m (303 ft 10 in) (o/a)
- Beam: 8.65 m (28 ft 5 in)
- Draft: 3.52 m (11 ft 7 in)
- Installed power: 3 × water-tube boilers; 23,000 shp (17,000 kW)
- Propulsion: 2 × shafts; 2 × geared steam turbine sets
- Speed: 34 knots (63 km/h; 39 mph)
- Range: 1,997 nmi (3,698 km; 2,298 mi) at 17 knots (31 km/h; 20 mph)
- Complement: 129
- Armament: 3 × single 10.5 cm (4.1 in) guns; 2 × triple 500 mm (19.7 in) torpedo tubes; 30 mines

Luchs was the fourth of six Type 24 torpedo boats built for the German Navy (initially called the Reichsmarine and then renamed as the Kriegsmarine in 1935) during the 1920s. The boat made multiple non-intervention patrols during the Spanish Civil War in the late 1930s. During World War II, she played a minor role in the Battle of Kristiansand during the Norwegian Campaign of 1940. Luchs was sunk in Norwegian waters in July by either a British submarine or a floating mine.

== Design and armament ==
Derived from the preceding Type 23 torpedo boat, the Type 24 was slightly larger and faster, but had a similar armament. The boats had an overall length of 92.6 meters (303 ft 10 in) and were 89 meters (292 ft) long at the waterline. They had a beam of 8.65 meters (28 ft 5 in), and a mean draft of 3.52 meters (11 ft 7 in). The Type 24s displaced 932 long tons (947 t) at standard load and 1,319 long tons (1,340 t) at deep load. Wolf's pair of Brown-Boveri geared steam turbine sets, each driving one propeller, were designed to produce 23,000 metric horsepower (17,000 kW; 23,000 shp) using steam from three water-tube boilers which would propel the ship at 34 knots (63 km/h; 39 mph). The boats carried enough fuel oil to give them a range of 1,997 nmi (3,698 km; 2,298 mi) at 17 knots (31 km/h; 20 mph). Their crew numbered 129 officers and sailors.

As built, the Type 24s mounted three 10.5 cm (4.1 in) SK C/28 (Note: In Kriegsmarine gun nomenclature, SK stands for Schiffskanone (ship's gun), C/30 stands for Constructionjahr (construction year) 1930.) guns, one forward and two aft of the superstructure, numbered one through three from bow to stern. They carried six above-water 50 cm (19.7 in) torpedo tubes in two triple mounts amidships and could also carry up to 30 mines. After 1931, the torpedo tubes were replaced by 533 mm (21 in) tubes and a pair of 2 cm (0.8 in) C/30 anti-aircraft guns were added. In 1932 the boat had her 10.5 cm guns replaced by 12.7 cm (5.0 in) SK C/34 guns for sea trials prior to their use on the Type 1934-class destroyers.

== Construction and career ==
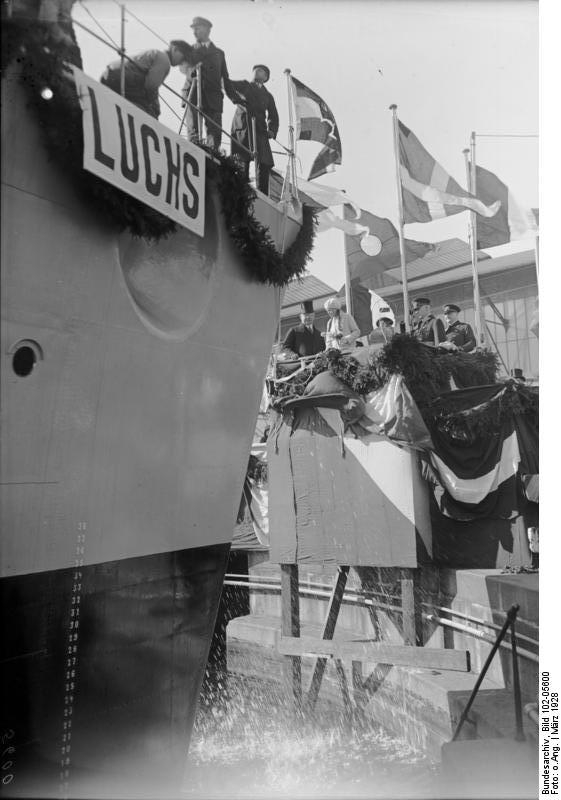
The launching of Luchs, 15 March 1928

Luchs was laid down at the Reichsmarinewerft Wilhelmshaven (Navy Yard) on 2 April 1927 as yard number 111, launched on 15 March 1928 and commissioned on 15 April 1929. By the end of 1936 she was assigned to the 2nd Torpedo Boat Flotilla and the boat made several deployments to Spain during the Spanish Civil War. Around June 1938, Luchs was transferred to the 4th Torpedo Boat Flotilla.

=== Second World War ===
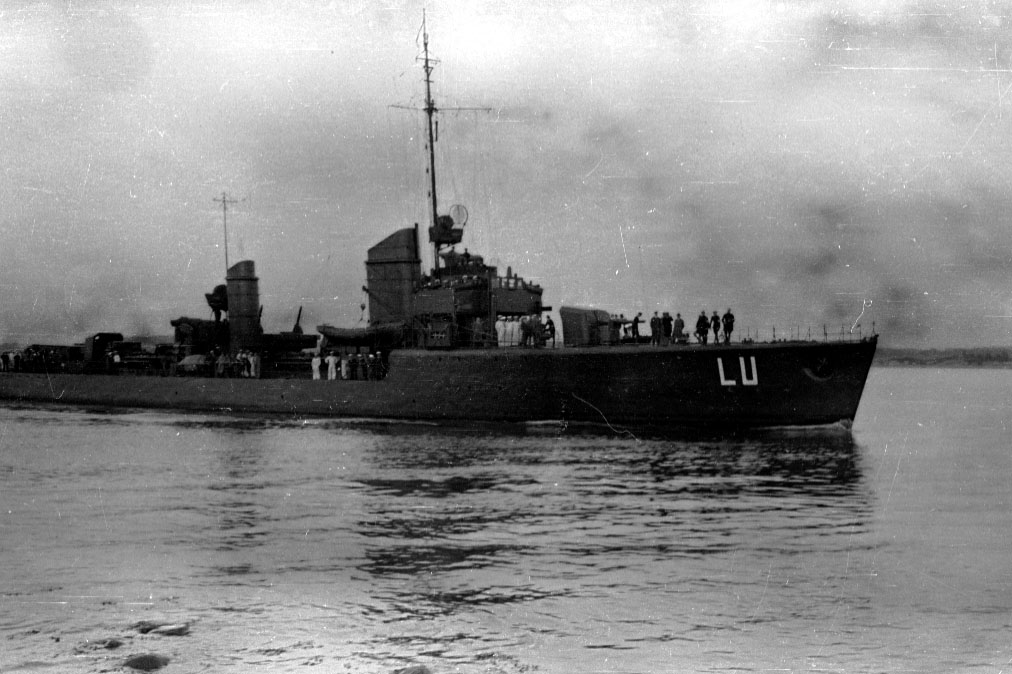
Luchs in Neustadt in Holstein, June 1934

At the beginning of the war, the 4th Flotilla was disbanded and Luchs was transferred to the 6th Torpedo Boat Flotilla where she supported the North Sea mining operations that began on 3 September 1939. In retaliation for the Altmark Incident where the Royal Navy seized captured British sailors from the German tanker Altmark in neutral Norwegian waters on 16 February, the Kriegsmarine organized Operation Nordmark to search for Allied merchant ships in the North Sea as far north as the Shetland Islands. The 2nd Destroyer Flotilla, Luchs and the torpedo boat Seeadler escorted the battleships Scharnhorst and Gneisenau and the heavy cruiser Admiral Hipper during the initial stages of the sortie on 18 February before patrolling the Skaggerak until the 20th.

During the Invasion of Norway in April 1940, the boat was assigned to Group 4 under Kapitän zur See (Captain) Friedrich Rieve on the light cruiser Karlsruhe, tasked to capture Kristiansand. They departed Wesermünde on the morning of 8 April and arrived off Kristiansand the following morning, delayed by heavy fog. They had been spotted approaching the city and the alerted coast-defense guns at Odderøya Fortress opened fire on Karlsruhe at 05:32. The cruiser, Luchs and Seeadler returned fire. Neither side inflicted any damage on the other, although several of Karlsruhe's shells missed their targets and impacted in the city. With only his forward guns able to bear and his ships loaded with troops, Rieve ordered them to turn away and lay a smoke screen to cover their withdrawal at 05:45. Shortly afterwards, a flight of six Heinkel He 111 bombers from Kampfgeschwader 4 (Bomber Wing) attacked the fortress. Most of their bombs fell outside the fortifications, but one blew up the western ammunition dump and another near the signal station, killing two men and cutting most external communication lines. Encouraged by sight of the blast from the ammunition dump and the numerous hits all over the island on which the fortress was built, Rieve ordered his ships to make another try at 05:55, this time at an angle so that all guns could bear. Accuracy for both sides was better this time, but no German ship was damaged and only a couple of shells from Karlsruhe landed inside the fort, wounding several gunners. With no discernable effect on the Norwegian defenses, Rieve was forced to withdraw again at 06:23. He now conceived the idea of bombarding the fortress at long range where he could use plunging fire to attack the guns from above and Karlsruhe would be out of range of the defending guns. The ship opened fire at 06:50 and Rieve ordered Luchs and Seeadler to steam through the narrows, but the fog closed in before they could get there and he had to cancel his order. The cruiser's fire was generally ineffective, with more shells landing in the city, so Rieve withdrew around 07:30 and requested additional air support.

Around that time a British reconnaissance aircraft overflew Kristiansand, but failed to see the German ships off shore. The naval commander of the area queried the supreme command whether British forces should be engaged or not and received the order to let them pass. He passed that order to Odderøya at 08:05. Rieve made another attempt to force the narrows around 09:00 when the fog briefly lifted, but nearly ran Karlsruhe aground and withdrew again. Getting desperate, Rieve ordered his troops loaded onto four of his small E-boats when the fog began to lift again at 09:25 and ordered them to storm the harbor regardless of casualties. An hour later, the Norwegians spotted the incoming German ships with Luchs and Seeadler approaching at high speed, followed by the four E-boats. They were reported at two cruisers and their approach from a different direction caused some observers to think that they were not German, especially since there had been a rumor earlier of British ships spotted in the Skaggerak. The confusion was compounded when observers reported that they were flying the French tricolor flag, confusing it with a Kriegsmarine signal flag of similar color. This caused the Norwegians to think that they were being saved by Allied ships and their guns did not open fire so the Germans landed without resistance and occupied the defenses beginning around 10:45.

Rieve was under orders to return to Kiel as soon as possible, so Karlsruhe sailed at 18:00, escorted by Luchs, Seeadler, and her sister Greif. At 18:58, one torpedo from the British submarine Truant struck the cruiser amidships, knocking out all power, steering and the pumps. Luchs evaded the other nine torpedoes and followed them to their origin and began depth charging the submarine for the next several hours, joined by the other two torpedo boats. Truant was damaged, but survived their attacks. Rieve ordered his crew aboard the torpedo boats and sent Luchs and Seeadler ahead while he remained with Greif to finish off Karlsruhe with a pair of torpedoes. After the heavy cruiser Lützow had been crippled by a British submarine off the Danish coast on 11 April, Luchs, Greif and Seeadler, among other ships, arrived the following morning to render assistance.

On 26 July Luchs and her sister, Iltis, sortied from Stavanger, Norway, to meet with the crippled Gneisenau en route from Trondheim to Kiel for repairs. They rendezvoused with the battleship at 12:45 and an explosion occurred aboard Luchs at 15:49. She broke in half off Jæren and sank with the loss of 102 men. Lookouts from Gneisenau reported torpedo tracks in the water at that time and the torpedo boat may have been struck by torpedoes aimed at the battleship. The other escorts unsuccessfully searched for a submarine and then rescued the few survivors. The Germans ascribed the sinking to a mine due to reports of floating mines in the area. Only a single British submarine, HMS Thames, could have made the attack, but she was lost with all hands around this time.
