= Hubert Schmundt =

German admiral (1888–1984)

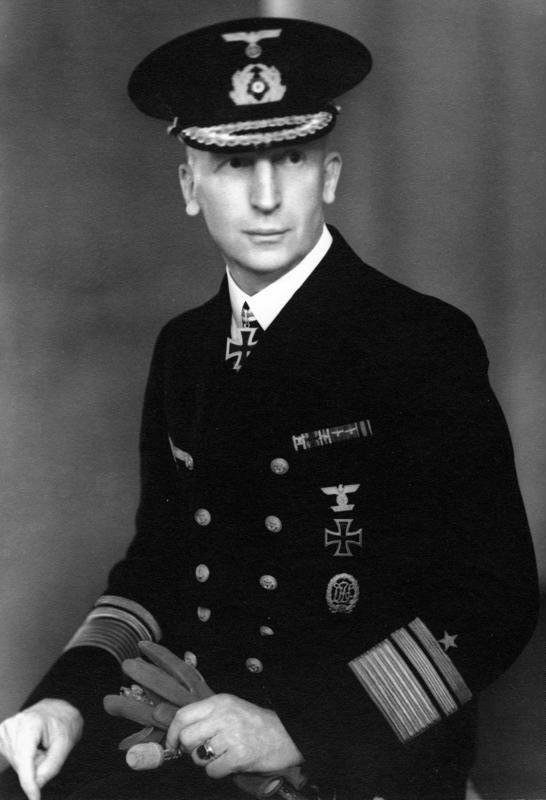
- Born: 19 September 1888; Schweidnitz
- Died: 17 October 1984 (aged 96); Bad Soden
- Military career
- Allegiance: German Empire; Weimar Republic; Nazi Germany
- Branch: Kriegsmarine
- Service years: 1908–44
- Rank: Admiral
- Commands: light cruiser Königsberg light cruiser Nürnberg; Naval Academy Mürwik
- Conflicts: World War I World War II
- Awards: Knight's Cross of the Iron Cross

Hubert Schmundt (19 September 1888 – 17 October 1984) was a German admiral during World War II. He was a recipient of the Knight's Cross of the Iron Cross of Nazi Germany.

== Career ==
Schmundt joined the German Imperial Navy (Kaiserliche Marine) as a cadet in 1908 and was commissioned as a lieutenant in 1911. He was serving with the East Asia Squadron aboard SMS Scharnhorst between 1910 and 1913 and returned to Germany in 1913. During World War I he was flag lieutenant of the 3rd destroyer flotilla and commanded the destroyer V71 being promoted to Kapitänleutnant in 1918. Schmundt was awarded the Iron Cross first and second class.

Schmundt remained in the Navy after the end of the war and in the 1920s commanded the torpedo boat S18 and served as a staff officer. He was promoted to Korvettenkapitän in 1927 and served as an aide to Defence Minister Wilhelm Groener between 1929 and 1932. During the 1930s, Schmundt commanded the light cruisers Königsberg (1934–35) and Nürnberg (1935–36). He became commander of the Naval Academy Mürwik in Flensburg-Mürwik in 1938 and was promoted to rear admiral.

In the Second World War, Schmundt commanded the Bergen warship group during Operation Weserübung, which consisted of the light cruisers Köln (flagship) and Königsberg, the artillery training ship Bremse, torpedo boat tender Carl Peters, torpedo boats Wolf and Leopard, and a group of smaller warships). Subsequently, Schmundt served as the commander of German naval forces in Northern Norway (1941–42) and oversaw Operation Wunderland. He later served as commander of German naval forces in the Baltic (1943–44). He was dismissed in April 1944 and taken prisoner by the British in 1945. He was released in 1947.

Schmundt died at the age of 96 on 17 October 1984.

== Awards ==
- Iron Cross (1914) 2nd Class (6 October 1915) & 1st Class (14 May 1917)
- Honour Cross of the World War 1914/1918 (21 December 1934)
- Sudetenland Medal (20 December 1939)
- Clasp to the Iron Cross (1939) 2nd Class (1 October 1939) & 1st Class (11 April 1940)
- Order of the Cross of Liberty 1st Class with Swords (25 March 1942)
- Knight's Cross of the Iron Cross on 14 June 1940 as Konteradmiral and commander in chief of the Aufklärungs-Streitkräfte and leader of the Kampfgruppe Bergen (Note: According to Scherzer as stellvertretender Befehlshaber der Aufklärungs-Streitkräfte und Führer der Kriegschiffgruppe 3 (Zielhafen Bergen)—deputy commander of the reconnaissance forces and leader of the warship group 3 (destination Bergen).)

== Notes ==
Military offices
Preceded by Vizeadmiral Günther Lütjens	Befehlshaber der Aufklärungsstreitkräfte (B.d.A.); 1 April 1940 – 31 July 1940	Succeeded by Re-designated Befehlshaber der Kreuzer (B.d.K.)
