= German torpedo boat Leopard =

Leopard
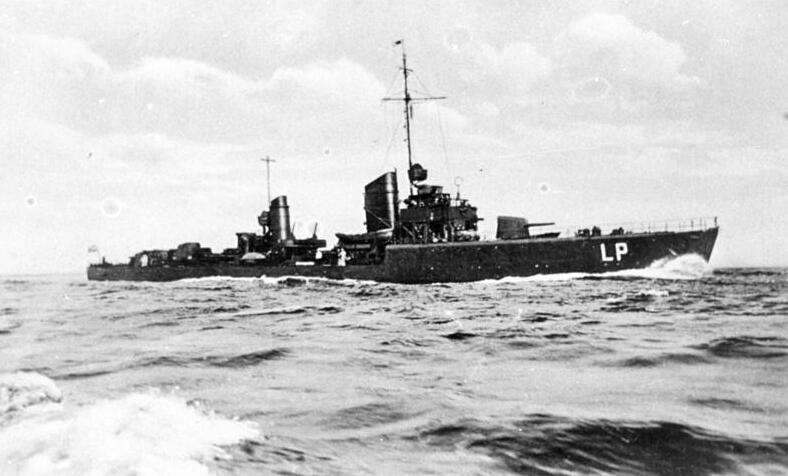
- Leopard at sea, 1934

History

Germany
- Name: Leopard
- Namesake: Leopard
- Builder: Reichsmarinewerft Wilhelmshaven
- Yard number: 114
- Laid down: 4 May 1927
- Launched: 15 March 1928
- Commissioned: 15 April 1929
- Fate: Sunk by collision, 30 April 1940

General characteristics (as built)
- Class & type: Type 24 torpedo boat
- Displacement: 932 long tons (947 t) (standard); 1,319 long tons (1,340 t) (deep load)
- Length: 92.6 m (303 ft 10 in) (o/a)
- Beam: 8.65 m (28 ft 5 in)
- Draft: 3.52 m (11 ft 7 in)
- Installed power: 3 × water-tube boilers; 23,000 shp (17,000 kW)
- Propulsion: 2 × shafts; 2 × geared steam turbine sets
- Speed: 34 knots (63 km/h; 39 mph)
- Range: 1,997 nmi (3,698 km; 2,298 mi) at 17 knots (31 km/h; 20 mph)
- Complement: 129
- Armament: 3 × single 10.5 cm (4.1 in) guns; 2 × triple 500 mm (19.7 in) torpedo tubes; 30 mines

Leopard was the fifth of six Type 24 torpedo boats built for the German Navy (initially called the Reichsmarine and then renamed as the Kriegsmarine in 1935) during the 1920s. The boat made multiple non-intervention patrols during the Spanish Civil War in the late 1930s. During World War II, she played a minor role in the occupation of Bergen during the Norwegian Campaign of April 1940. Leopard was sunk at the end of the month when she was accidentally rammed by a minelayer that she was escorting.

== Design and armament ==
Derived from the preceding Type 23 torpedo boat, the Type 24 was slightly larger and faster, but had a similar armament. The boats had an overall length of 92.6 meters (303 ft 10 in) and were 89 meters (292 ft) long at the waterline. They had a beam of 8.65 meters (28 ft 5 in), and a mean draft of 3.52 meters (11 ft 7 in). The Type 24s displaced 932 long tons (947 t) at standard load and 1,319 long tons (1,340 t) at deep load. Wolf's pair of Brown-Boveri geared steam turbine sets, each driving one propeller, were designed to produce 23,000 metric horsepower (17,000 kW; 23,000 shp) using steam from three water-tube boilers which would propel the ship at 34 knots (63 km/h; 39 mph). The boats carried enough fuel oil to give them a range of 1,997 nmi (3,698 km; 2,298 mi) at 17 knots (31 km/h; 20 mph). Their crew numbered 129 officers and sailors.

As built, the Type 24s mounted three 10.5 cm (4.1 in) SK C/28 (Note: In Kriegsmarine gun nomenclature, SK stands for Schiffskanone (ship's gun), C/28 stands for Constructionjahr (construction year) 1928.) guns, one forward and two aft of the superstructure, numbered one through three from bow to stern. They carried six above-water 50 cm (19.7 in) torpedo tubes in two triple mounts amidships and could also carry up to 30 mines. After 1931, the torpedo tubes were replaced by 533 mm (21 in) tubes and a pair of 2 cm (0.8 in) C/30 anti-aircraft guns were added. In 1932 the boat had her 10.5 cm guns replaced by 12.7 cm (5.0 in) SK C/34 guns for sea trials prior to their use on the Type 1934-class destroyers.

== Construction and career ==
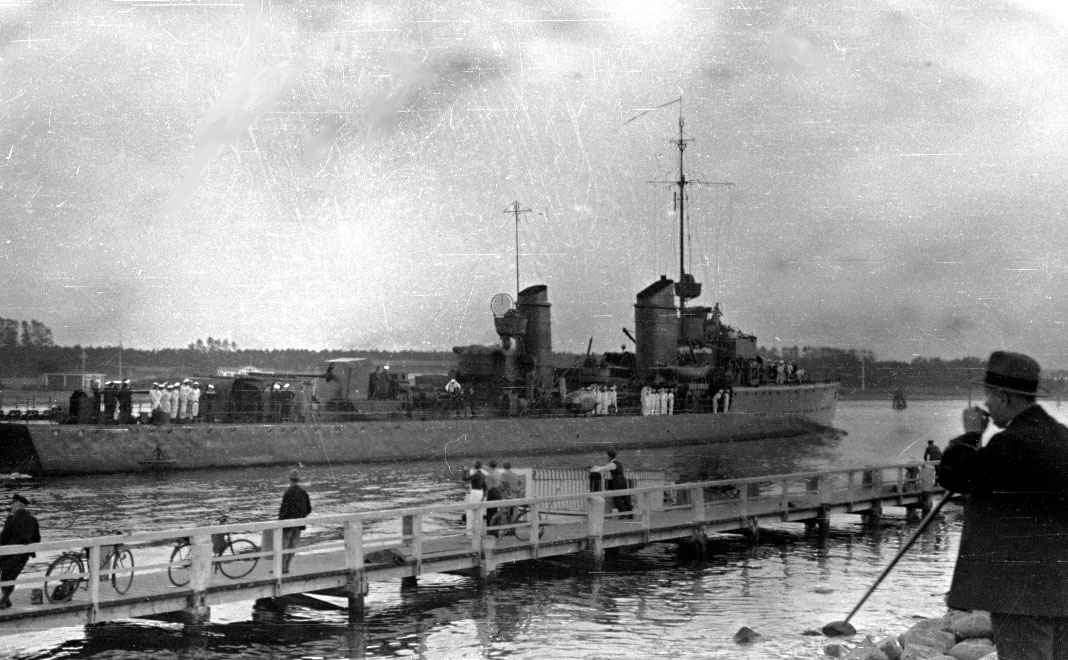
Leopard at Neustadt in Holstein, June 1934

Leopard was laid down at the Reichsmarinewerft Wilhelmshaven (Navy Yard) on 4 May 1927 as yard number 114, launched on 15 March 1928 and commissioned on 1 June 1929. By the end of 1936 she was assigned to the 2nd Torpedo Boat Flotilla and the boat made several deployments to Spain during the Spanish Civil War. Around June 1938, Leopard was transferred to the 4th Torpedo Boat Flotilla.

=== Spanish Civil War ===
The first mission to Spain lasted from 28 July to 27 August 1936; the four boats of the 2nd Flotilla and the light cruiser Köln followed the heavy cruisers Deutschland and Admiral Scheer to the north Spanish coast, where Germans and other refugees were evacuated to France.

=== Second World War ===
At the beginning of the war, the 4th Flotilla was disbanded and Leopard was transferred to the 6th Torpedo Boat Flotilla where she supported the North Sea mining operations that began on 3 September 1939. On 17–19 October Leopard, together with her sister ships Iltis and Wolf, and three destroyers patrolled the Skagerrak to inspect neutral shipping for contraband goods. On 13, 18 and 19 November, the 6th Flotilla and one or two light cruisers met destroyers returning from minelaying missions off the English coast. Two days later the flotilla made another contraband patrol in the Skagerrak before returning to port on the 25th.

During the Norwegian Campaign, Leopard and Wolf were assigned to Group 3 under Konteradmiral (Rear Admiral) Hubert Schmundt on the light cruiser Köln, tasked to capture Bergen harbor. After loading troops of the invasion force in Cuxhaven, the torpedo boats and the depot ship Carl Peters proceeded independently to rendezvous with the rest of Group 3 on the afternoon of 8 April. Under orders to land his troops before dawn on 9 April, Schmundt's ships entered the Krossfjorden around midnight. They were spotted shortly afterwards by a Norwegian patrol boat which alerted the Norwegian defenses. All ships flashed light signals identifying them as British ships whenever challenged, but the Norwegians were not fooled. Schmundt ordered Leopard to assume the lead just before they entered the Byfjorden leading to Bergen around 04:00. Kvarven Fort opened fire shortly afterwards, and then Hellen Fort, but they made no hits on the leading ships before they moved out of sight into Bergen harbor at 04:13 where they began landing their troops.

Concerned that his small force could be counter-attacked by the numerous British ships reported to be operating in the North Sea and that they were within range of British bombers, Schmundt took Köln, Leopard and Wolf to sea early that evening. The torpedo boats streamed their minesweeping gear and cut the cables of two mines which floated to the surface as they proceeded through the fjords. Worried that he might be intercepted after receiving further reports of British ships off the Norwegian coast, Schmundt took his ships into the Maurangerfjord where they anchored at 02:00. The following morning, the pilot of a Norwegian Marinens Flyvebaatfabrikk M.F.11 floatplane mistook Leopard for a friendly ship, but realized his mistake after landing and was able to escape without damage. Schmundt headed for home as darkness was setting in and reached Wilhelmshaven the following evening. While escorting a group of minelayers returning from laying a minefield in the Skaggerak on 30 April, Leopard was sunk when she was accidentally rammed by the minelayer Preussen.
