= German torpedo boat Wolf =

Wolf
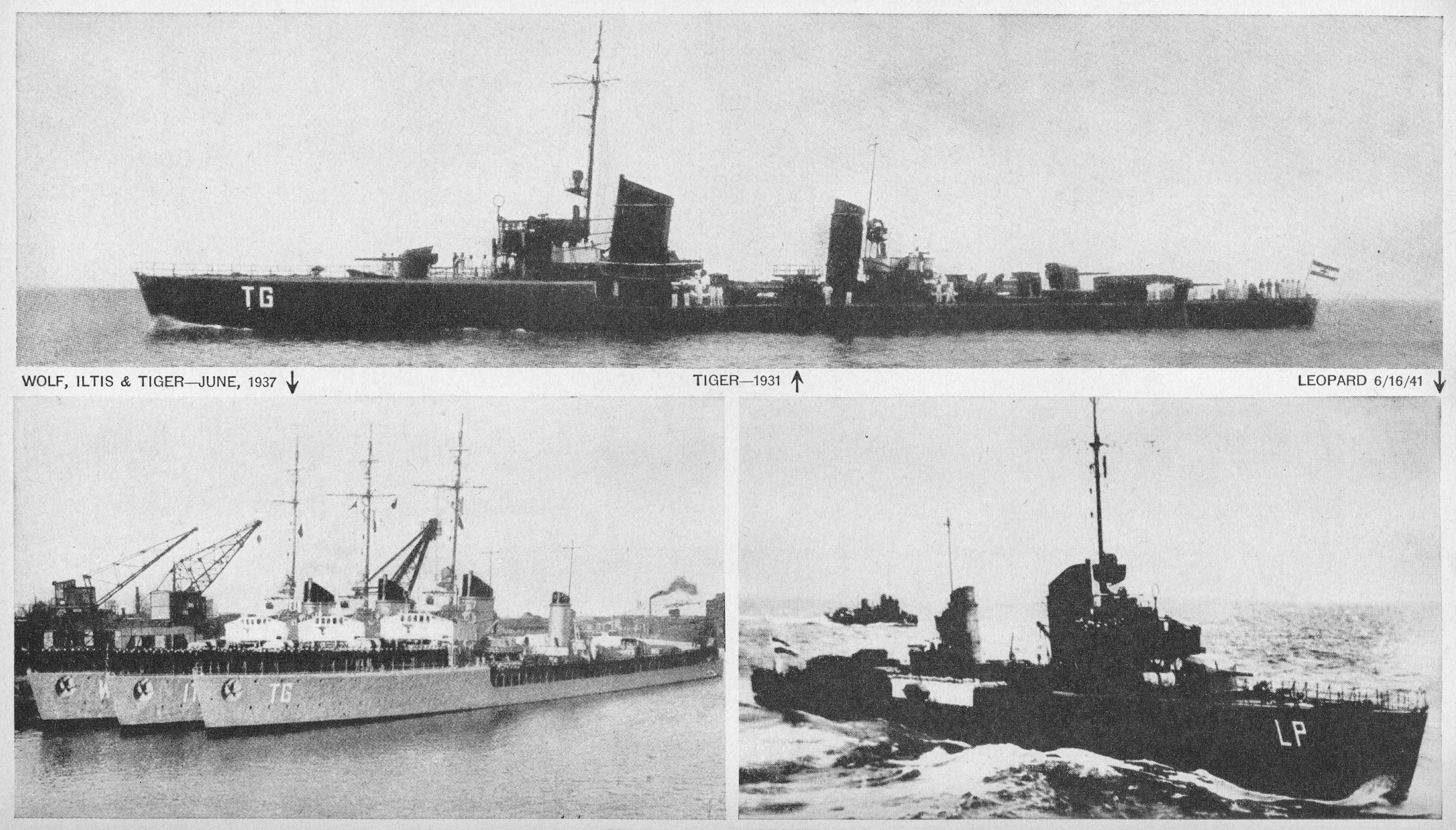
- Type 1924 (Raubtier-class) torpedo boats

History

Germany
- Name: Wolf
- Namesake: Wolf
- Builder: Reichsmarinewerft Wilhelmshaven
- Yard number: 109
- Laid down: 8 March 1927
- Launched: 12 October 1927
- Commissioned: 15 November 1928
- Fate: Sunk by mine, 8 January 1941

General characteristics (as built)
- Class & type: Type 24 torpedo boat
- Displacement: 932 long tons (947 t) (standard); 1,319 long tons (1,340 t) (deep load)
- Length: 92.6 m (303 ft 10 in) (o/a)
- Beam: 8.65 m (28 ft 5 in)
- Draft: 3.52 m (11 ft 7 in)
- Installed power: 3 × water-tube boilers; 23,000 shp (17,000 kW)
- Propulsion: 2 × shafts; 2 × geared steam turbine sets
- Speed: 34 knots (63 km/h; 39 mph)
- Range: 1,997 nmi (3,698 km; 2,298 mi) at 17 knots (31 km/h; 20 mph)
- Complement: 129
- Armament: 3 × single 10.5 cm (4.1 in) guns; 2 × triple 500 mm (19.7 in) torpedo tubes; 30 mines

Wolf was the second of six Type 24 torpedo boats built for the German Navy (initially called the Reichsmarine and then renamed as the Kriegsmarine in 1935) during the 1920s. The boat made multiple non-intervention patrols during the Spanish Civil War in the late 1930s. During World War II, she played a minor role in the occupation of Bergen during the Norwegian Campaign of April 1940. Wolf escorted minelayers once as they laid minefields in late April before beginning a refit that lasted until August. She was transferred to France around September and conducted offensive patrols in the English Channel as well as laying minefields herself. The ship struck a mine and was sunk returning from one such mission in January 1941.

== Design and description ==
Derived from the preceding Type 23 torpedo boat, the Type 24 was slightly larger and faster, but had a similar armament. The boats had an overall length of 92.6 meters (303 ft 10 in) and were 89 meters (292 ft) long at the waterline. They had a beam of 8.65 meters (28 ft 5 in), and a mean draft of 3.52 meters (11 ft 7 in). The Type 24s displaced 932 long tons (947 t) at standard load and 1,319 long tons (1,340 t) at deep load. Wolf's pair of Brown-Boveri geared steam turbine sets, each driving one propeller, were designed to produce 23,000 metric horsepower (17,000 kW; 23,000 shp) using steam from three water-tube boilers which would propel the ship at 34 knots (63 km/h; 39 mph). The boats carried enough fuel oil to give them a range of 1,997 nmi (3,698 km; 2,298 mi) at 17 knots (31 km/h; 20 mph). Their crew numbered 129 officers and sailors.

As built, the Type 24s mounted three 10.5 cm (4.1 in) SK C/28 (Note: In Kriegsmarine gun nomenclature, SK stands for Schiffskanone (ship's gun), C/30 stands for Constructionjahr (construction year) 1930.) guns, one forward and two aft of the superstructure, numbered one through three from bow to stern. They carried six above-water 50 cm (19.7 in) torpedo tubes in two triple mounts amidships and could also carry up to 30 mines. After 1931, the torpedo tubes were replaced by 533 mm (21 in) tubes and a pair of 2 cm (0.8 in) C/30 anti-aircraft guns were added.

== Construction and career ==
Wolf was laid down at the Reichsmarinewerft Wilhelmshaven (Navy Yard) on 8 March 1927 as yard number 109, launched on 12 October 1927 and commissioned on 15 November 1928. The boat was initially assigned to the 3rd Torpedo Boat Half-Flotilla and by the end of 1936 she was assigned to the 2nd Torpedo Boat Flotilla. She made several deployments to Spain during the Spanish Civil War. Around June 1938, Tiger was transferred to the 3rd Torpedo Boat Flotilla which was renumbered as the 6th Flotilla on 1 July.

=== Second World War ===
Wolf supported the North Sea mining operations that began on 3 September 1939. On 17–19 October Wolf, together with her sister ships Iltis and Leopard and three destroyers, patrolled the Skagerrak to inspect neutral shipping for contraband goods. On 13, 18 and 19 November, the 6th Flotilla and one or two light cruisers met destroyers returning from minelaying missions off the English coast. The flotilla made another contraband patrol in the Skagerrak on 24–25 November.

During the Norwegian Campaign, Wolf and Leopard were assigned to Group 3 under Konteradmiral (Rear Admiral) Hubert Schmundt on the light cruiser Köln, tasked to capture Bergen harbor. After loading troops of the invasion force in Cuxhaven, the torpedo boats and the depot ship Carl Peters proceeded independently to rendezvous with the rest of Group 3 on the afternoon of 8 April. Under orders to land his troops before dawn on 9 April, Schmundt's ships entered the Krossfjorden around midnight. They were spotted shortly afterwards by a Norwegian patrol boat which alerted the Norwegian defenses. All ships flashed light signals identifying them as British ships whenever challenged, but the Norwegians were not fooled. Schmundt ordered Leopard to assume the lead just before they entered the Byfjorden leading to Bergen around 04:00. Kvarven Fort opened fire shortly afterwards, and then Hellen Fort, but they made no hits on the leading ships before they moved out of sight into Bergen harbor at 04:13 where they began landing their troops.

Concerned that his small force could be counter-attacked by the numerous British ships reported to be operating in the North Sea and that they were within range of British bombers, Schmundt took Köln, Leopard and Wolf to sea early that evening. The torpedo boats streamed their minesweeping gear and cut the cables of two mines which floated to the surface as they proceeded through the fjords. Worried that he might be intercepted after receiving further reports of British ships off the Norwegian coast, Schmundt took his ships into the Maurangerfjord where they anchored at 02:00. Schmundt headed for home as darkness was setting in and reached Wilhelmshaven the following evening. Escorted by Wolf, two destroyers, and the torpedo boats Kondor and Möwe, minelayers laid a minefield in the Skaggerak on 29–30 April. En route, Leopard was sunk when she was accidentally rammed by the minelayer Preussen. Wolf was refitted in Stettin, Germany, from May to August.

Now assigned to the 5th Torpedo Boat Flotilla, Wolf escorted the minelayers Stralsund and Skaggerak from Le Havre to Brest, France, on 28–29 September. The flotilla made an unsuccessful sortie off the Isle of Wight on 8–9 October. They made a second, more successful, sortie on 11–12 October, sinking two Free French submarine chasers and two British trawlers. The 5th Flotilla was transferred to St. Nazaire later that month. On 8 January 1941, Wolf and Kondor laid a minefield off Dover, but Wolf struck a mine off Dover on the return voyage and sank at 51°05′N 02°08′E with the loss of 45 crewmen.
