= Reichsmarine =

- Naval ensign
- Active: 1 January 1921 – 31 May 1935
- Country: Weimar Republic - Nazi Germany
- Type: Navy
- Part of: Reichswehr

Commanders
- Last commander: Erich Raeder

The Reichsmarine ('Reich Navy') was the name of the German Navy during the Weimar Republic and first two years of Nazi Germany. It was the naval branch of the Reichswehr, existing from 1919 to 1935. In 1935, it was renamed as the Kriegsmarine (War Navy), a branch of the Wehrmacht; a change implemented by Adolf Hitler. Many of the administrative and organizational tenets of the Reichsmarine were then carried over into the organization of the Kriegsmarine.

== Vorläufige Reichsmarine ==
The Vorläufige Reichsmarine (lit. 'Provisional Reich Navy') was formed after the end of World War I from the Imperial German Navy.

The provisions of the Treaty of Versailles restricted the German Navy to 15,000 men and no submarines, while the fleet was limited to six pre-dreadnought battleships, six light cruisers, twelve destroyers, and twelve torpedo boats. Replacements for the outdated battleships were restricted to a maximum size of 10,000 tons.

== Reichsmarine ==
One of the designs for the German Navy's War Flag in 1919 (but it was never ultimately used)

The Reichsmarine was considered the armed naval force of the Reichswehrministerium (Ministry of the Reichswehr) which was headed by a civilian minister appointed by the Weimar government. The senior most naval officer was known until 1920 as the Chef der Admiralität (Chief of the Admiralty), after which the title changed to Chef der Marineleitung (Chief of the Naval Command).

=== Naval headquarters ===
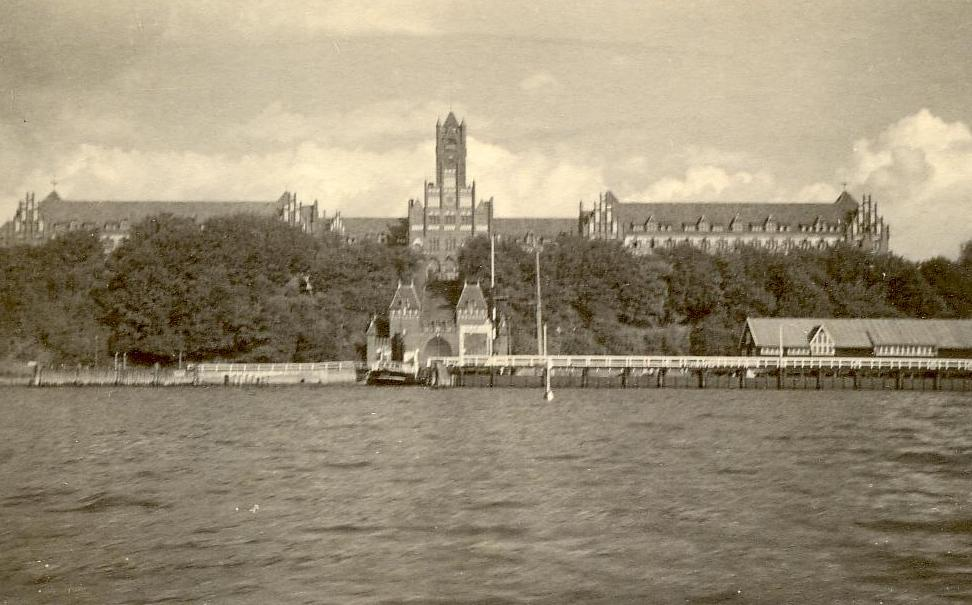
The Mürwik Naval School in 1929

The naval commander oversaw a headquarters office known as the Marinekommandiertenabteilung which was headquartered in Berlin. The Naval Command also maintained a headquarters intelligence office Marinenachrichtenoffizier) and a naval archives. Internal to the naval headquarters five offices known as the:

- Marinekommandoamt (A) – Operations
- Allgemeine Marineamt (B) – General Administration
- Marineverwaltungsamt (C) – Personnel and Administration
- Marinewaffenamt (MWa) – Naval Weapons Department
- Marinekonstruktionsamt (K) – Naval Construction Office

The following officers served as head of the Reichsmarine from 1918 to 1935

=== Chief of the Admiralty (Chef der Admiralität) ===
| No. | Portrait | Chefs der Admiralität | Took office | Left office | Time in office |
|---|---|---|---|---|---|
| 1 | Adolf von Trotha | Vizeadmiral; Adolf von Trotha (1868–1940) | 26 March 1919 | 22 March 1920 | 362 days |
| - | William Michaelis | Konteradmiral; William Michaelis (1871–1948); Acting | 22 March 1920 | 1 September 1920 | 163 days |
| 2 | Paul Behncke | Vizeadmiral; Paul Behncke (1869–1937) | 1 September 1920 | 14 September 1920 | 13 days |

=== Heads of the Naval Command (Chefs der Marineleitung) ===
| No. | Portrait | Chefs der Marineleitung | Took office | Left office | Time in office |
|---|---|---|---|---|---|
| 1 | Paul Behncke | Vizeadmiral; Paul Behncke (1869–1937) | 14 September 1920 | 1 October 1924 | 4 years, 17 days |
| 2 | Hans Zenker | Vizeadmiral; Hans Zenker (1870–1932) | 1 October 1924 | 30 September 1928 | 3 years, 365 days |
| 3 | Erich Raeder | Admiral; Erich Raeder (1876–1960) | 1 October 1928 | 1 June 1935 | 6 years, 243 days |

=== Fleet command ===
The fleet command of the Reichsmarine (Flottenkommando) was headquartered at Kiel and consisted of a flag staff and fleet commander embarked on board the flagship of the German fleet. During the 1920s, the German flagship was the battleship Schleswig-Holstein with two naval officers serving as fleet commander, Vizeadmiral Hans Zenker and Konrad Mommsen, between 1923 and 1927. The fleet commander position was then left vacant, but the flag staff remained.

The purpose of the fleet command was to oversee the four major type commanders of German naval vessels. These commands were in turn responsible for the administration of various German ship classes to include equipment development, vessel deployments, and personnel assignment. Once at sea, operational control of the vessels switched to the commanders of the two main Naval Sea Stations. The four type commands were:

- Befehlshaber der Linienschiffe – Commander of Ships of the Line, headquartered at Kiel, flagship in 1933 was the cruiser Deutschland
- Befehlshaber der Aufklärungsstreitkräfte – Commander of Reconnaissance Craft, flagship was the cruiser Königsberg headquartered at Kiel
- Führer der Torpedoboote – Leader of Torpedo-boats, headquartered at Swinemünde overseeing four flotillas of torpedo boats
- Führer der Minsensuchboote – Leader of Minesweepers, headquartered at Kiel commanding two minesweeper flotillas and one Räumbooten ("R boat") mine auxiliary unit.

=== Naval sea stations ===
The Reichsmarine did not maintain traditional at-sea fleets, but instead assigned two geographical areas (known as Marinestation) which oversaw all vessels operationally deployed in the North and Baltic Seas. Each naval station maintained a headquarters staff, general naval inspectorate, training department, artillery arsenal inspector, as well as a medical command unit. The naval stations also served as a senior officer for the commanders of the various German navy ports.

==== Naval stations of the Reichsmarine ====
- Marinestation der Nordsee (North Sea naval station) – headquartered at Wilhelmshaven, overseeing the ports of Cuxhaven and Borkum
- Marinestation der Ostsee (Baltic Sea naval station) – headquartered at Kiel, overseeing the ports of Swinemünde and Pillau

=== Ships and equipment ===
The Treaty of Versailles limited the size and armament of the Reichsmarine and prevented it from introducing new technologies. The restrictions were intended to prevent the German Navy from becoming a threat to the Allied powers. On the other hand, the Allies had made certain that the Reichsmarine would be in the foreseeable future the strongest power in the Baltic Sea, in order to serve as a counterweight against the new Soviet Union, which was viewed with distrust by the Allies.

Germany was only allowed six pre-dreadnought battleships (plus two in reserve), six cruisers (plus two in reserve), twelve destroyers (plus four in reserve), and twelve torpedo boats (plus four in reserve). The Reichsmarine tried to meet the arms restrictions with secret armament and technical innovations such as the introduction of the pocket battleship.

==== List of Reichsmarine ships ====
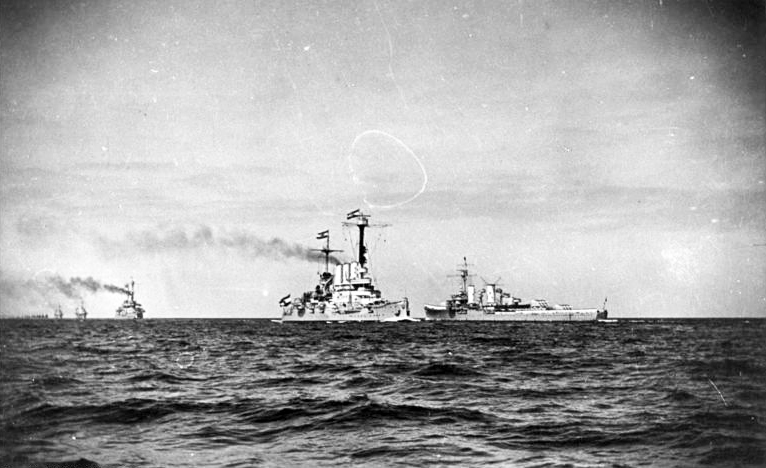
Ships of the Reichsmarine on maneuvers in 1929 with a Königsberg-class cruiser on the right

- Deutschland-class battleships
  - SMS Hannover (1907–1944)
  - SMS Schlesien (1908–1945)
  - SMS Schleswig-Holstein (1908–1944)
- Braunschweig-class battleships
  - SMS Braunschweig (1904–1932)
  - SMS Elsass (1904–1936)
  - SMS Hessen (1905–1960)
  - SMS Preussen (1905–1931)
  - SMS Lothringen (1906–1931)
- Bremen-class cruisers
  - SMS Hamburg (1904–1927)
  - SMS Berlin (1906–1929)
- Gazelle-class cruisers (3,033 tons, 10 × 105 mm guns)
  - SMS Niobe (1900–1925)
  - SMS Nymphe (1900–1931)
  - SMS Thetis (1901–1929)
  - SMS Amazone (1901–1931)
  - SMS Medusa (1901–1945)
  - SMS Arcona (1903–1945)
- Emden-class cruiser (6,000 tons, 8 × 150 mm guns)
  - Emden (1925–1945)
- Königsberg-class cruisers (7,200 tons, 9 × 150 mm guns)
  - Königsberg (1929–1940)
  - Karlsruhe (1929–1940)
  - Köln (1930–1945)
- Leipzig-class cruisers (8,000 tons, 9 × 150 mm guns)
  - Leipzig (1931–1946)
  - Nürnberg (1935–1945)
- Deutschland-class cruisers (10,800 tons, 6 × 280 mm guns)
  - Deutschland (1933–1948)
  - Admiral Scheer (1934–1945)
  - Admiral Graf Spee (1936–1939)
- Type 23 torpedo boats (923 tons, 3 × 105 mm guns)
  - Möwe (1926–1944)
  - Falke (1928–1944)
  - Greif (1927–1944)
  - Kondor (1928–1944)
  - Albatros (1928–1940)
  - Seeadler (1927–1942)
- Type 24 torpedo boats (933 tons, 3 × 105 mm guns)
  - Wolf (1928–1941)
  - Iltis (1928–1942)
  - Jaguar (1929–1944)
  - Leopard (1929–1940)
  - Luchs (1929–1940)
  - Tiger (1929–1939)
- Type 1934 Destroyers (2,223 tons, 5 × 127 mm guns)
  - Z1 Leberrecht Maass (1937–1940)
  - Z2 Georg Thiele (1937–1940)
  - Z3 Max Schultz (1937–1940)
  - Z4 Richard Beitzen (1937–1949)
- Survey ship
  - Meteor (1924–1945)
- Radio-controlled target ship
  - Zähringen (1902–1945)

== See also ==
- NV Ingenieurskantoor voor Scheepsbouw
