= 10.5 cm SK C/28 naval gun =

10.5 cm SK C28
- Type: Naval gun
- Place of origin: Germany

Service history
- In service: 1930—1945
- Used by: Germany
- Wars: World War II

Production history
- Designed: 1928–1930

Specifications
- Mass: 3,660 kg (8,070 lb)
- Length: 5.76 m (18 ft 11 in)
- Barrel length: 5.43 m (17 ft 10 in) (52 caliber)
- Shell: Fixed cartridge
- Shell weight: 14.7 kg (32 lb)
- Calibre: 105 mm (4.1 in)
- Breech: Horizontal sliding-block
- Carriage: MPL C/30
- Elevation: −10°/+30°
- Traverse: 360°
- Rate of fire: 15 RPM
- Muzzle velocity: 925 m/s (3,030 ft/s)
- Maximum firing range: 17,250 m (18,860 yd) at 30°

The 10.5 cm SK C/28 (Note: In Kriegsmarine gun nomenclature, SK stands for Schiffskanone (ship's gun), C/28 stands for Constructionjahr (construction year) 1928.) gun was a naval gun developed by Germany during the late 1920s. It was the primary armament of the six Type 24 torpedo boats of the Reichsmarine.

== Development and description ==
The gun was designed in 1928–1930 and entered service the latter year. It weighed 3,660 kilograms (8,070 lb) and had an overall length of 5.76 metres (18 ft 11 in). Its 52-caliber barrel was 5.43 metres (17 ft 10 in) long. The gun fired 10.5-centimetre (4.1 in) fixed ammunition with a 14.7-kilogram (32 lb) projectile at a muzzle velocity of 925 metres per second (3,030 ft/s). This gave it a range of 17,250 metres (18,860 yd) at an elevation of 30°.

The gun was only used on the single-gun MPL C/30 mounting. It had a traverse of 360° and elevation limits of -10° and +30°. The manually operated mount could be traversed and elevated at a speed of 3° per second. The gun had a rate of fire of 15 rounds per minute.

The guns aboard the Type 24 torpedo boats Luchs and Leopard were bored out in 1932 to 12.8 centimetres (5 in) and served as prototypes for the 12.7-centimetre (5 in) SK C/34 gun.

== Bibliography ==
- Campbell, John (1985). Naval Weapons of World War II. Annapolis, Maryland: Naval Institute Press. ISBN 978-0-87021-459-2.
- Skwiot, Mirosław Zbigniew (2011). German Naval Guns 1939-1945. Barnsley, UK: Seaforth. ISBN 978-1-59114-311-6.
