= HMS Fernie =

Destroyer of the Royal Navy

History

United Kingdom
- Name: Fernie
- Ordered: 21 March 1939
- Builder: John Brown & Company, Clydebank
- Laid down: 8 June 1939
- Launched: 12 December 1939
- Completed: 8 June 1940
- Identification: Pennant number: L11
- Honours and awards: English Channel 1940–44; North Sea 1941–45; Dieppe 1942; Normandy 1944
- Fate: Scrapped, 1956
- Badge: On a Field White upon a saltire couped Red, two foxes brushes in saltire Gold.

General characteristics
- Class & type: Type I Hunt-class destroyer
- Displacement: 1,000 long tons (1,016 t) standard; 1,340 long tons (1,362 t) full load
- Length: 85 m (278 ft 10 in) o/a
- Beam: 8.8 m (28 ft 10 in)
- Draught: 3.27 m (10 ft 9 in)
- Installed power: 2 × Admiralty 3-drum boilers; 19,000 shp (14,000 kW)
- Propulsion: 2 shafts; 2 geared steam turbines
- Speed: 27.5 knots (50.9 km/h; 31.6 mph); 26 knots (48 km/h; 30 mph) full
- Range: 3,500 nmi (6,500 km; 4,000 mi) at 15 knots (28 km/h; 17 mph); 1,000 nmi (1,900 km; 1,200 mi) at 26 knots (48 km/h; 30 mph)
- Complement: 146
- Armament: 4 × QF 4 in (102 mm) guns; 4 × 2-pdr (40 mm (1.6 in)) AA guns; 2 × 20 mm (0.8 in) AA guns; 40 depth charges, 2 throwers, 1 rack

HMS Fernie was a Type I Hunt-class destroyer built for the Royal Navy completed in mid-1940. She was adopted by the Civil Community of Market Harborough, Leicestershire, as part of the Warship Week campaign in 1942. She has been the only ship in the Royal Navy to carry this name.

== Service history ==
On commissioning in 1940 Fernie completed work ups for service the English Channel. She provided escort cover during the evacuation of troops from French Channel Ports in June 1940. The following month she provided escort cover during the laying of the minefield of the northern barrage, north of North Rona. During the rest of the year she undertook escort duties in the English Channel.

During 1941 and 1942 she continued escort duties in the English Channel and North sea. In August 1942 she was part of the escort force supporting the landings in the abortive Dieppe Raid and was subject to heavy air attack during the raid.

In 1943 Fernie undertook convoy defence in the North Sea. In the following year was nominated to provide support for the Allied landings in Normandy. She then returned to convoy escort and patrol duties in the North Sea and English Channel.

After August 1945 she was used as an air target ship at Rosyth. She was subsequently placed in reserve at Chatham. She was then sold to BISCO for scrap. She arrived for scrapping at Port Glasgow on 7 November 1956.

== Publications ==
- Atherton, D.; Brady, Mark & Buxton, Ian (2002). "Question 46/01". Warship International. XXXIX (4): 346–348. ISSN 0043-0374.
- Colledge, J. J.; Warlow, Ben (2006) [1969]. Ships of the Royal Navy: The Complete Record of All Fighting Ships of the Royal Navy from the 15th Century to the Present (3rd Rev ed.). London: Chatham Publishing. ISBN 978-1-86176-281-8. OCLC 67375475.
- English, John (1987). The Hunts: A History of the Design, Development and Careers of 86 Destroyers of This Class Built for the Royal and Allied Navies During World War II. Cumbria, UK: World Ship Society. ISBN 0-905617-44-4.
