= Action of 13 May 1942 =

Naval engagement during World War II

- Part of World War II, Battle of the Atlantic
Date	13 May 1942
Location	Straits of Dover, English Channel
Result	British victory: Stier reaches Gironde

Belligerents
United Kingdom	(Nazi Germany) Germany

Strength
Motor Torpedo Boats	1 Auxiliary cruiser; 4 Torpedo boats (Note: German torpedo boats were not small boats like the British MTBs, but actually ships slightly smaller than destroyers.); 16 minesweepers

Casualties and losses
1 MTB sunk; 9 killed	2 Torpedo Boats sunk; 203 killed

The action of 13 May 1942 was a naval engagement during World War II between the British Royal Navy and the German Kriegsmarine. It was an attempt by Royal Navy Motor Torpedo Boats (MTBs) to stop the German auxiliary cruiser Stier from reaching Gironde, France. Stier made it through the English Channel and arrived in Gironde on 19 May, but MTBs sunk the German fleet torpedo boats Iltis and Seeadler. MTB 220 was sunk by the German ships.

== Background ==
Stier was an auxiliary cruiser, a former merchant ship armed with hidden weapons and designed to be used as a merchant raider. The German plan was for Stier, disguised as the minesweeper Sperrbrecher 171, to be escorted through the English Channel to Gironde, France. From there, Stier was to break out into the Atlantic to attack Allied merchant ships. The escort for Stier was the 5th Torpedo Boat Flotilla, consisting of the torpedo boats Seeadler, Kondor, Falke, and Iltis as well as 16 R-boat minesweepers. The torpedo boats were all of the Raubvogel or Raubtier class. Stier left Rotterdam with the escort on 12 May, heading into the channel.

== The battle ==
The German ships began picking up British MTBs on radar around two hours after midnight on 13 May. Crew on some of the German ships reported hearing motor noises, but the MTBs could not be seen. The German ships were shelled by British coastal batteries in the Strait of Dover, but the batteries scored no hits.

At around 3:30 am, the MTBs began their attack. German gunners hit and sunk MTB 220, and damaged several other MTBs. Nine men lost their lives on the British side, eight of them crewmembers of MTB 220. Around 4:00 am, one of the MTBs fired a torpedo at Stier that missed and hit Iltis instead, breaking Iltis in two. Less than fifteen minutes later, Seeadler was also hit by a torpedo, rolled over, split, and sank. As Stier and its remaining escorts neared German shore batteries at Boulogne, the MTBs withdrew. Around 203 German sailors lost their lives in the battle.

== Aftermath ==
Stier and its escort did not encounter any other Royal Navy forces after 13 May. However, on 15 May RAF aircraft attacked the German ships. The minesweeper M 26 was sunk off Cap de la Hague and M 256 was badly damaged. On 19 May Stier reached Gironde, and broke out into the Atlantic on 20–21 May.
