= Kriegsmarinewerft Wilhelmshaven =

German naval shipyard (1918–1945)

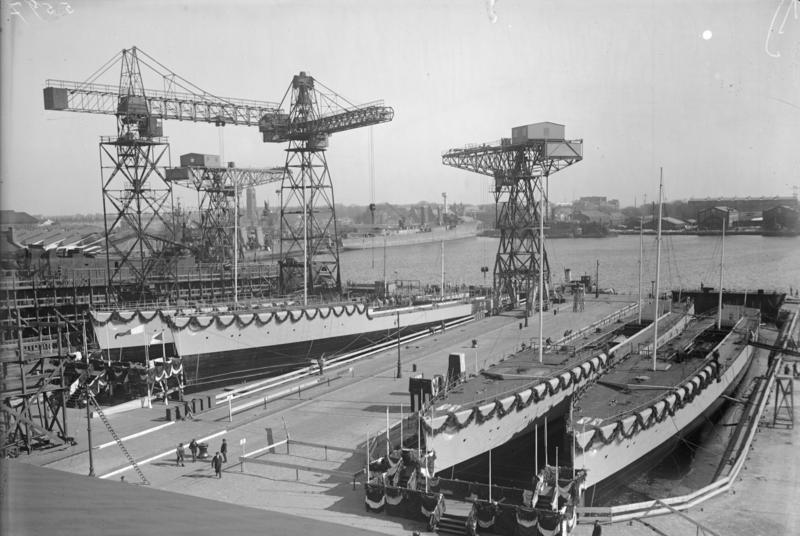
- Four Type 24 torpedo boats being launched in Kriegsmarinewerft Wilhelmshaven
- Industry: Shipbuilding
- Founded: 1918
- Defunct: 1945
- Fate: Dismantled after World War II
- Headquarters: Wilhelmshaven, Germany
- Products: Warships; U-boats

Kriegsmarinewerft Wilhelmshaven ([ˈkʁiːksmaˌʁiːnə.vɛʁft ˌvɪlhɛlmsˈhaːfn̩], lit. 'War Navy Shipyard', known 1918–35 as Reichsmarinewerft Wilhelmshaven) was, between 1918 and 1945, a naval shipyard in the German Navy's extensive base at Wilhelmshaven, (80 miles (130 km) west of Hamburg).

== History ==
The shipyard was founded on the site of the Wilhelmshaven Imperial Shipyard which had been closed down after World War I.

In 1935, the name was changed to Kriegsmarinewerft Wilhelmshaven when the German navy (Reichsmarine) was renamed Kriegsmarine by the Nazi Third Reich.

During World War II, the yard's main activities were in building warships, U-boats and repairing damaged warships. On 18 December 1939, 12 out of 22 RAF's Wellington bombers were shot down in an air battle over the naval base. Personnel were often assigned to organizing naval facilities in occupied countries, e.g., in the ports of Lorient, Brest and St. Nazaire. At the war's end there were about 17,000 workers.

Polish and British troops reached Wilhelmshaven in May 1945. For a time, the yard refurbished ships to be sent to the Allies as war reparations but, from 1946, most buildings and equipment were either dismantled or blown up.

Since 1957, part of the site has housed an arsenal for the modern German Navy (Deutsche Bundesmarine).

== Selection of ships built ==
- 1920-1922: 28 fishing vessels
- 1922: four cargo ships
- 1925: Light cruiser Emden
- 1926-1928: six torpedo-boats
- 1929: K-class light cruiser Königsberg
- 1930: K-class light cruiser Köln
- 1931: Gunnery training ship Bremse
- 1934: Deutschland-class Panzerschiff (armoured ship, later classified as heavy cruiser) Admiral Scheer
- 1936: Deutschland-class Panzerschiff Admiral Graf Spee
- 1939: Scharnhorst-class battleship Scharnhorst
- 1941: Bismarck-class battleship Tirpitz
- 1941-1944: 27 Type VII submarines ( U-751 to U-768 and U-771 to U-779)
