= German torpedo boat T3 =

German torpedo boat

- Right elevation and plan of the Type 1935

History

Nazi Germany
- Name: T3
- Ordered: 16 November 1935
- Builder: Schichau, Elbing, East Prussia
- Yard number: 1382
- Laid down: 14 November 1936
- Launched: 23 June 1938
- Completed: 3 February 1940
- Fate: Sunk by a mine, 14 March 1945

General characteristics (as built)
- Class & type: Type 35 torpedo boat
- Displacement: 859 long tons (873 t) (standard)
- Length: 84.3 m (276 ft 7 in) o/a
- Beam: 8.62 m (28 ft 3 in)
- Draft: 2.83 m (9 ft 3 in)
- Installed power: 4 × water-tube boilers; 31,000 shp (23,000 kW)
- Propulsion: 2 × shafts; 2 × geared steam turbines
- Speed: 35 knots (65 km/h; 40 mph)
- Range: 1,200 nmi (2,200 km; 1,400 mi) at 19 knots (35 km/h; 22 mph)
- Complement: 119
- Armament: 1 × single 10.5 cm (4.1 in) gun; 1 × single 3.7 cm (1.5 in) AA gun; 2 × single 2 cm (0.8 in) AA guns; 2 × triple 533 mm (21 in) torpedo tubes; 30–60 mines

The German torpedo boat T3 was one of a dozen Type 35 torpedo boats built for the Kriegsmarine (German Navy) during the late 1930s. Completed during the Second World War in 1940, she was assigned to escort duties between Germany and Occupied Norway in August before beginning to escort minelayers in the North Sea the following month. The boat was sunk in France by British bombers in September and was refloated the following year. T3 was assigned to the Torpedo School when her repairs were completed in 1943. She returned to active duty a year later and escorted German ships as they bombarded Soviet positions. The boat sank a Soviet submarine in early 1944 and she struck a mine in March 1945 and sank with heavy loss of life.

== Design and description ==
The Type 35 was an unsuccessful attempt by the Kriegsmarine to design a fast, ocean-going torpedo boat that did not exceed the 610-metric-ton (600-long-ton) displacement limit of the London Naval Treaty for ships that counted against the national tonnage limit even though Germany was not a signatory to the treaty. The boats displaced 859 metric tons (845 long tons) at standard load and 1,108 metric tons (1,091 long tons) at deep load, exceeding the planned limit. They had an overall length of 84.3 meters (276 ft 7 in) and were 82.2 meters (269 ft 8 in) long at the waterline. After the bow was rebuilt in 1941 to improve seaworthiness, their overall length increased to 87.1 meters (285 ft 9 in). The Type 35s had a beam of 8.62 meters (28 ft 3 in), and a mean draft of 2.83 meters (9 ft 3 in) at deep load. Their crew numbered 119 officers and sailors. Their pair of geared steam turbine sets, each driving one propeller shaft, were designed to produce 31,000 shaft horsepower (23,000 kW) using steam from four high-pressure water-tube boilers which would propel the boats at 35 knots (65 km/h; 40 mph). They carried enough fuel oil to give them a range of 1,200 nautical miles (2,200 km; 1,400 mi) at 19 knots (35 km/h; 22 mph).

As built, the Type 35 class mounted a single 10.5 cm (4.1 in) SK C/32 gun on the stern. Anti-aircraft defense was provided by a single 3.7 cm (1.5 in) SK C/30 anti-aircraft gun superfiring over the 10.5 cm gun and a pair of 2 cm (0.8 in) C/30 guns on the bridge wings. They carried six above-water 533 mm (21 in) torpedo tubes in two triple mounts and could also carry 30 mines on deck (or 60 if the weather was good). Many boats exchanged the 3.7 cm gun for another 2 cm gun, depth charges and minesweeping paravanes before completion; T3 is only known to have been fitted with paravanes and depth charges before her loss in 1945.

== Construction and career ==
T3 was ordered on 16 November 1935 from Schichau, laid down at their Elbing, East Prussia, shipyard on 14 November 1936 as yard number 1382, launched on 23 June 1938 and commissioned on 3 February 1940. In April T3 and her sister ship T7 suffered 400 boiler tube failures when raising steam, causing the formation of a special commission to investigate the high-pressure powerplant in the Type 35s. The investigation revealed that much more steam was required to operate the turbines and the auxiliary machinery than anticipated and that circulation of the boiler feedwater was inadequate. Both ships were to serve as testbeds for the necessary modifications to remedy these issues. The boat was working up until early August when she joined the 2nd Torpedo Boat Flotilla in escorting the replenishment oiler Dithmarschen from Germany to Norway. Now assigned to the 5th Torpedo Boat Flotilla, T3, her sister T2, and the torpedo boats Jaguar, Falke, Greif, Kondor, and Iltis escorted minelayers as they laid a minefield in the southwestern North Sea on 14–15 August. The following month, T3, T2 and Kondor were transferred to the 1st Torpedo Boat Flotilla with the torpedo boat T1. On 6–7 September they escorted a minelaying mission in the English Channel. After an attack by British aircraft on Le Havre, France, on the evening of 18 September, T3 capsized with the loss of nine crewmen after being hit by a bomb. She was refloated in 1941 and towed to Germany for repairs.

The boat was recommissioned on 12 December 1943 at Danzig (modern Gdańsk), still lacking radar and a reinforced anti-aircraft suite like the later ships of her class, and was assigned to the Torpedo School as a training ship. A year later she was transferred to the 2nd Torpedo Boat Flotilla in the Baltic Sea. Escorted by the 2nd Flotilla (T3, her sisters T5, T9, T12 and the torpedo boats T13 and T16), the heavy cruisers Admiral Scheer and Prinz Eugen shelled Soviet positions during the evacuation of Sworbe, on the Estonian island of Saaremaa, between 20 and 24 November. She rammed and sank the Soviet submarine S-4 on 6 January 1945 when the submarine surfaced 100 metres (110 yd) directly ahead of the torpedo boat. T3's machine gunners opened fire on S-4's conning tower while the torpedo boat reversed her engines to break free from the submarine's hull. S-4 sank bow first with her stern protruding above the water so T3 completed her destruction with a barrage of 20 depth charges. The boat had damaged her bow in the attack and had to return to Gotenhafen (modern Gdynia) for repairs. While escorting a convoy near Hela, East Prussia, T3 and T5 struck mines laid by the Soviet submarine L-21 on 14 March and sank. Including refugees aboard T3, some 300 people died when she sank.
