= German torpedo boat T4 =

German torpedo boat

- Right elevation and plan of the Type 1935

History

Nazi Germany
- Name: T4
- Ordered: 16 November 1935
- Builder: Schichau, Elbing, East Prussia
- Yard number: 1383
- Laid down: 29 December 1936
- Launched: 15 September 1938
- Completed: 27 April 1940
- Fate: Scrapped, 1950–1951

General characteristics (as built)
- Class & type: Type 35 torpedo boat
- Displacement: 859 long tons (873 t) (standard); 1,108 long tons (1,126 t) (deep load)
- Length: 84.3 m (276 ft 7 in) o/a
- Beam: 8.62 m (28 ft 3 in)
- Draft: 2.83 m (9 ft 3 in)
- Installed power: 4 × water-tube boilers; 31,000 shp (23,000 kW)
- Propulsion: 2 × shafts; 2 × geared steam turbines
- Speed: 35 knots (65 km/h; 40 mph)
- Range: 1,200 nmi (2,200 km; 1,400 mi) at 19 knots (35 km/h; 22 mph)
- Complement: 119
- Armament: 1 × single 10.5 cm (4.1 in) gun; 1 × single 3.7 cm (1.5 in) AA guns; 2 × single 2 cm (0.8 in) AA guns; 2 × triple 533 mm (21 in) torpedo tubes; 30–60 mines

The German torpedo boat T4 was one of a dozen Type 35 torpedo boats built for the Kriegsmarine (German Navy) during the late 1930s. Completed during World War II in mid-1940, she participated in an abortive attempt to attack several convoys off the Scottish coast in November 1940. The boat was one of the escorts for several commerce raiders passing through the English Channel in 1941 and 1942 and helped to escort a pair of battleships and a heavy cruiser through the Channel back to Germany in the Channel Dash. She was assigned to the Torpedo School in mid-1943 and was then transferred to the Baltic Sea a year later. The boat was allocated to the United States after the war, but she was sold to Denmark a few years later. Unused by the Royal Danish Navy, T4 was scrapped in 1951–1952.

== Design and description ==
The Type 35 was an unsuccessful attempt by the Kriegsmarine to design a fast, ocean-going torpedo boat that did not exceed the 600-long-ton (610 t) displacement limit of the London Naval Treaty for ships that counted against the national tonnage limit. The boats had an overall length of 84.3 meters (276 ft 7 in) and were 82.2 meters (269 ft 8 in) long at the waterline. After the bow was rebuilt in 1941 to improve seaworthiness, the overall length increased to 87.1 meters (285 ft 9 in). The ships had a beam of 8.62 meters (28 ft 3 in), and a mean draft of 2.83 meters (9 ft 3 in) at deep load and displaced 859 metric tons (845 long tons) at standard load and 1,108 metric tons (1,091 long tons) at deep load. Their crew numbered 119 officers and sailors. Their pair of geared steam turbine sets, each driving one propeller, were designed to produce 31,000 shaft horsepower (23,000 kW) using steam from four high-pressure water-tube boilers which would propel the boats at 35 knots (65 km/h; 40 mph). They carried enough fuel oil to give them a range of 1,200 nautical miles (2,200 km; 1,400 mi) at 19 knots (35 km/h; 22 mph).

As built, the Type 35 class mounted a single 10.5 cm (4.1 in) SK C/32 gun on the stern. Anti-aircraft defense was provided by a single 3.7 cm (1.5 in) SK C/30 anti-aircraft gun superfiring over the 10.5 cm gun and a pair of 2 cm (0.8 in) C/30 guns on the bridge wings. They carried six above-water 533 mm (21 in) torpedo tubes in two triple mounts and could also carry 30 mines (or 60 if the weather was good). Many boats exchanged the 3.7 cm gun for another 2 cm gun, depth charges and minesweeping paravanes before completion. Late-war additions were limited to the installation of radar, radar detectors and additional AA guns, usually at the expense of the aft torpedo tube mount.

== Construction and career ==
T4 was ordered on 16 November 1935 from Schichau, laid down at their Elbing, East Prussia, shipyard on 29 December 1936 as yard number 1383, launched on 15 September 1938 and commissioned on 27 May 1940. The boat was working up until October when she was transferred to Norway for convoy escort duties. By November the 1st and 2nd Torpedo Boat Flotillas were based in Stavanger, Norway. German aerial reconnaissance had located two coastal convoys in early November that the Kriegsmarine estimated would pass Kinnaird Head, Scotland, during the early morning of 7 November. Both flotillas, consisting of T4 and her sisters, T1, T6, T7, T8, T9 and T10, sailed on 6 November in an attempt to pass through a gap in the British minefields and intercept the convoys around 02:00 the following morning. The British had extended their minefields further north unbeknownst to the Germans and T6 struck a mine shortly after midnight and sank. T7 and T8 rescued the survivors and the operation was abandoned. T4 began a refit in February 1941 that lasted until September when she was transferred to the West.

On 16 November, T4, T7 and their sister T12 departed Copenhagen, Denmark, en route to Cherbourg, France, to meet the commerce raider Komet. The torpedo boats arrived on the 25th and Komet reached Cherbourg the following day. The ships departed that night and arrived at Le Havre the following morning, where they waited for night to fall before proceeding. The British had spotted them and they were intercepted by motor torpedo boats (MTB) on the 28th between Boulogne and Dunkirk. In a very confused night action, T12 accidentally hit T4 several times, injuring several men, one of the MTBs machine-gunned T4's bridge, wounding four men, including her captain, and a dud star shell fired by one of the escorting minesweepers stuck the boat's forward torpedo mount, sending splinters through the steam lines in No. 2 boiler room, which reduced her maximum speed to 24 knots (44 km/h; 28 mph). Despite the attack, Komet reached the Atlantic. On 3 December T4, T7 and the torpedo boat T14 rendezvoused with the commerce raider Thor and T2 and T12 in the Schillig Roads. Later that day, they began to escort Thor through the Channel. Delayed by heavy fog, the ships did not reach Brest, France, until the 15th, while Thor continued onwards into the Atlantic.

As part of the preparations for the Channel Dash, the Kriegsmarine substituted a quadruple 2 cm mount for T4's aft torpedo tubes and added a 2 cm single mount at the bow to reinforce the boat's anti-aircraft suite. On the morning of 12 February 1942, the 2nd and 3rd Torpedo Boat Flotillas (with T2, T4, T5, T11, T12 and T13, T15, T16, and T17 respectively) rendezvoused with the battleships Gneisenau and Scharnhorst and the heavy cruiser Prinz Eugen to escort them through the Channel to Germany. T4's torpedo tubes were replaced afterwards, although the quadruple mounting may have been moved to the aft superfiring position and she also may have kept her bow-chaser. On 20–22 July the 3rd Torpedo Boat Flotilla, consisting of T4, T10, T13 and T14, laid two minefields in the Channel. The flotilla, now consisting of T4, T10, T14 and T19 made an unsuccessful attempt to escort Komet through the Channel on 13–14 October. They were intercepted by a British force of five escort destroyers and eight MTBs that sank the raider and severely damaged T10. T4, on the other hand, was struck by stray machine-gun fire from Komet that wounded several men.

T4 began a refit at Wesermünde in January 1943 that lasted 11 May after which she was assigned to the Torpedo School. The boat was overhauled in March–June 1944 and was then transferred to the Baltic. At the end of the year, T4 was assigned to the 2nd Torpedo Boat Flotilla together with T1, T3 and T8. T4 was allocated to the United States when the Allies divided the surviving ships of the Kriegsmarine amongst themselves in late 1945. The United States Navy had no interest in her and she was sold to Denmark on 18 June 1948 for use as a MTB leader. Never commissioned by the Royal Danish Navy, the boat was demolished in 1950–1951.
