= German torpedo boat T9 =

German torpedo boat

- Right elevation and plan of the Type 1935

History

Nazi Germany
- Name: T9
- Ordered: 29 June 1936
- Builder: Schichau, Elbing, East Prussia
- Yard number: 1393
- Laid down: 24 November 1936
- Launched: 3 November 1938
- Completed: 4 July 1940
- Fate: Scuttled, 8 May 1945

General characteristics (as built)
- Class & type: Type 35 torpedo boat
- Displacement: 859 long tons (873 t) (standard); 1,108 long tons (1,126 t) (deep load)
- Length: 84.3 m (276 ft 7 in) o/a
- Beam: 8.62 m (28 ft 3 in)
- Draft: 2.83 m (9 ft 3 in)
- Installed power: 4 × water-tube boilers; 31,000 shp (23,000 kW)
- Propulsion: 2 × shafts; 2 × geared steam turbines
- Speed: 35 knots (65 km/h; 40 mph)
- Range: 1,200 nmi (2,200 km; 1,400 mi) at 19 knots (35 km/h; 22 mph)
- Complement: 119
- Armament: 1 × single 10.5 cm (4.1 in) gun; 1 × single 3.7 cm (1.5 in) AA guns; 2 × single 2 cm (0.8 in) AA guns; 2 × triple 533 mm (21 in) torpedo tubes; 30–60 mines

The German torpedo boat T9 was one of a dozen Type 35 torpedo boats built for the Kriegsmarine (German Navy) during the late 1930s. Completed in July 1940, the boat participated in an abortive attempt to attack several convoys off the Scottish coast in November. T9 was placed in reserve in August 1941 and was reactivated in June 1942 for duties in France. She participated in an unsuccessful attempt to escort a blockade runner through the Bay of Biscay in early 1943 and was then transferred to the Torpedo School in September. In mid-1944 the boat returned to active duty and was assigned to the Baltic Sea area. She escorted a bombardment mission in November and was damaged by bombers in East Prussia in early 1945. T9 was sunk near Kiel, Germany, during an air raid on 3 May.

== Design and description ==
The Type 35 was an unsuccessful attempt by the Kriegsmarine to design a fast, ocean-going torpedo boat that did not exceed the 600-long-ton (610 t) displacement limit of the London Naval Treaty for ships that counted against the national tonnage limit. The boats had an overall length of 84.3 meters (276 ft 7 in) and were 82.2 meters (269 ft 8 in) long at the waterline. After the bow was rebuilt in 1941 to improve seaworthiness, the overall length increased to 87.1 meters (285 ft 9 in). The ships had a beam of 8.62 meters (28 ft 3 in), and a mean draft of 2.83 meters (9 ft 3 in) at deep load and displaced 859 metric tons (845 long tons) at standard load and 1,108 metric tons (1,091 long tons) at deep load. Their crew numbered 119 officers and sailors. Their pair of geared steam turbine sets, each driving one propeller, were designed to produce 31,000 shaft horsepower (23,000 kW) using steam from four high-pressure water-tube boilers which would propel the boats at 35 knots (65 km/h; 40 mph). They carried enough fuel oil to give them a range of 1,200 nautical miles (2,200 km; 1,400 mi) at 19 knots (35 km/h; 22 mph).

As built, the Type 35 class mounted a single 10.5 cm (4.1 in) SK C/32 gun on the stern. Anti-aircraft defense was provided by a single 3.7 cm (1.5 in) SK C/30 anti-aircraft gun superfiring over the 10.5 cm gun and a pair of 2 cm (0.8 in) C/30 guns on the bridge wings. They carried six above-water 533 mm (21 in) torpedo tubes in two triple mounts and could also carry 30 mines (or 60 if the weather was good). Many boats exchanged the 3.7 cm gun for another 2 cm gun, depth charges and minesweeping paravanes before completion. Late-war additions were limited to the installation of radar, radar detectors and additional AA guns, usually at the expense of the aft torpedo tube mount.

== Construction and career ==
T9 was ordered on 29 June 1936 from Schichau, laid down at their Elbing, East Prussia, shipyard on 24 November 1936 as yard number 1393, launched on 3 November 1938 and commissioned on 4 July 1940. The boat was working up until August when she began convoy escort duties in the Baltic Sea. By November T9 had transferred to Norway. German aerial reconnaissance had located two coastal convoys in early November that the Kriegsmarine estimated would pass Kinnaird Head, Scotland, during the early morning of 7 November. Both the 1st and 2nd Torpedo Boat Flotillas, consisting of T9 and her sisters, T1, T4, T6, T7, T8 and T10, sailed on 6 November in an attempt to pass through a gap in the British minefields and intercept the convoys around 02:00 the following morning. The British had extended their minefields further north unbeknownst to the Germans and T6 struck a mine shortly after midnight and sank. T7 and T8 rescued the survivors and the operation was abandoned. T9 was one of the escorts for a minelaying mission off Stavanger, Norway, on the night of 27/28 January 1941 together with her sisters T5 and T12 and the minesweepers M15 and M22. T9 began a refit in March in Kiel that lasted until July. The boat was reduced to reserve on 15 August.

T9 was recommissioned in June 1942 and was working up until August. On 15–19 August she was one of the escorts, together with T12 and the destroyer Z23, for the minelayer Ulm from Kiel to Narvik, Norway. The boat was transferred to France in November and was one of the escorts for the Italian blockade runner, Himalaya, together with her sisters T2 and T12 and the torpedo boats Falke, T18 and T23, but the Italian ship turned back on 28 March 1943 when spotted by a British reconnaissance aircraft. T9 began a refit at Schichau on 9 May that lasted until August. The boat was then transferred to the Torpedo School as a training ship. She was transferred back to active service in mid-1944 and was assigned to the 2nd Torpedo Boat Flotilla in the Baltic, which consisted of T9, her sisters T3, T5, T12 and the torpedo boats T13 and T16. On the night of 23/24 November, the flotilla screened the heavy cruiser Admiral Scheer as she shelled Soviet positions during the evacuation of Sworbe, on the island of Ösel. T9 was damaged by bombs in Danzig on 8 March 1945. She was sunk by British aircraft on 3 May in the Kieler Förde at 54°26′N 18°34′E. Her wreck was demolished by depth charges on 10 December.
