= German torpedo boat T1 =

German torpedo boat

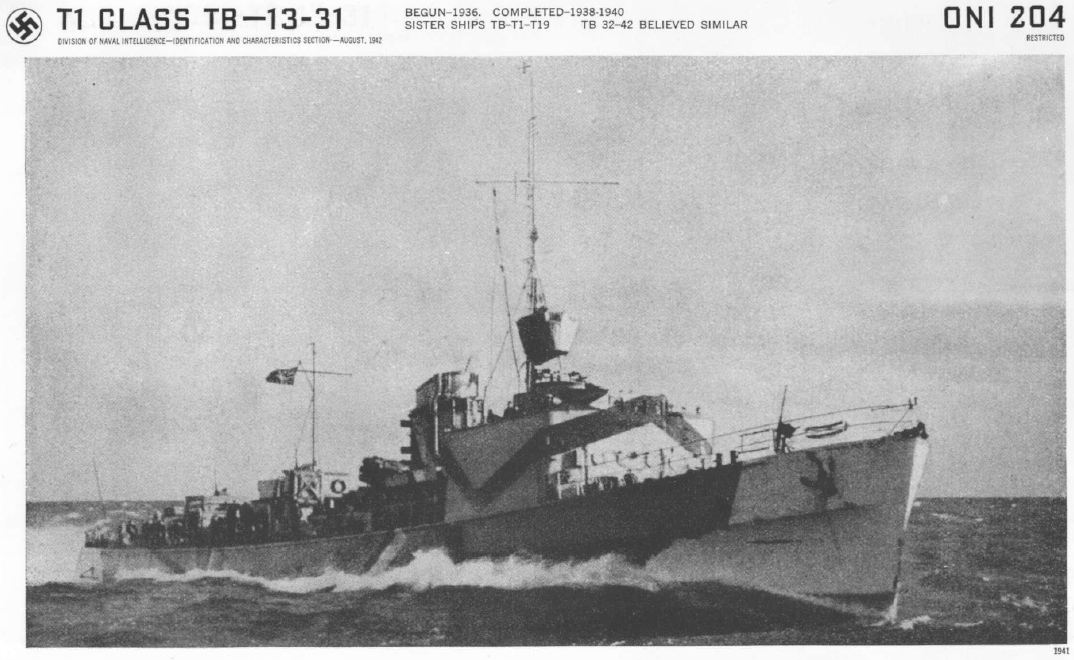
- Photo of T1 from the US Office of Naval Intelligence 1942 Ship Recognition Manual

History

Nazi Germany
- Name: T1
- Ordered: 16 November 1935
- Builder: Schichau, Elbing, East Prussia
- Yard number: 1380
- Laid down: 14 November 1936
- Launched: 17 February 1938
- Completed: 1 December 1939
- Fate: Sunk by aircraft, 9 April 1945

General characteristics (as built)
- Class & type: Type 35 torpedo boat
- Displacement: 859 t (845 long tons) (standard)
- Length: 84.3 m (276 ft 7 in) o/a
- Beam: 8.62 m (28 ft 3 in)
- Draft: 2.83 m (9 ft 3 in)
- Installed power: 4 × water-tube boilers; 31,000 shp (23,000 kW)
- Propulsion: 2 × shafts; 2 × geared steam turbines
- Speed: 35 knots (65 km/h; 40 mph)
- Range: 1,200 nmi (2,200 km; 1,400 mi) at 19 knots (35 km/h; 22 mph)
- Complement: 119
- Armament: 1 × single 10.5 cm (4.1 in) gun; 1 × single 3.7 cm (1.5 in) AA guns; 2 × single 2 cm (0.8 in) AA guns; 2 × triple 533 mm (21 in) torpedo tubes; 30–60 mines

The German torpedo boat T1 was the lead ship of her class of a dozen torpedo boats built for the Kriegsmarine (German Navy) during the late 1930s. Completed in late 1939, she was assigned to escort minelayers as they laid their minefields in the English Channel in September 1940. The boat participated in an abortive attempt to attack several convoys off the Scottish coast two months later. T1 ran aground in January 1941 and was under repair until July. The following month she was placed in reserve and was reactivated in June 1942 for duty with the Torpedo School. In April 1944 the boat returned to active duty and was assigned to the Baltic Sea area. She escorted a bombardment mission in January 1945 and was sunk during an air raid on 9 April while refitting.

== Design and description ==
The Type 35 was an unsuccessful attempt by the Kriegsmarine to design a fast, ocean-going torpedo boat that did not exceed the 600-long-ton (610 t) displacement limit of the London Naval Treaty because such small ships did not count against the national tonnage limit. The boats had an overall length of 84.3 meters (276 ft 7 in) and were 82.2 meters (269 ft 8 in) long at the waterline. After the bow was rebuilt in 1941 to improve seaworthiness, the overall length increased to 87.1 meters (285 ft 9 in). The ships had a beam of 8.62 meters (28 ft 3 in), and a mean draft of 2.83 meters (9 ft 3 in) at deep load and displaced 859 metric tons (845 long tons) at standard load and 1,108 metric tons (1,091 long tons) at deep load. Their crew numbered 119 officers and sailors. Their pair of geared steam turbine sets, each driving one propeller, were designed to produce 31,000 shaft horsepower (23,000 kW) using steam from four high-pressure water-tube boilers which would propel the boats at 35 knots (65 km/h; 40 mph). They carried enough fuel oil to give them a range of 1,200 nautical miles (2,200 km; 1,400 mi) at 19 knots (35 km/h; 22 mph).

As built, the Type 35 class mounted a single 10.5 cm (4.1 in) SK C/32 gun on the stern. Anti-aircraft defense was provided by a single 3.7 cm (1.5 in) SK C/30 anti-aircraft gun superfiring over the 10.5 cm gun and a pair of 2 cm (0.8 in) C/30 guns on the bridge wings. They carried six above-water 533 mm (21 in) torpedo tubes in two triple mounts and could also carry 30 mines (or 60 if the weather was good). Many boats exchanged the 3.7 cm gun for another 2 cm gun, depth charges and minesweeping paravanes before completion. Late-war additions were limited to the installation of radar, radar detectors and additional AA guns, usually at the expense of the aft torpedo tube mount.

As late as April 1944, T1 had neither received radar nor had her anti-aircraft suite augmented. In mid-July the boat exchanged her rear torpedo mount for a 3.7 cm AA gun. No further information is available on any other modifications she might have received before her loss in 1945.

== Construction and career ==
T1 was ordered on 16 November 1935 from Schichau, laid down at their Elbing, East Prussia, shipyard on 14 November 1936 as yard number 1380, launched on 17 February 1938 and commissioned on 1 December 1939. Plagued with mechanical problems, the boat was working up until September 1940. T1 escorted a minelaying mission in the English Channel on 6–7 September as part of the 1st Torpedo Boat Flotilla with her sister ships T2, T3, and the torpedo boat Kondor. Five days later, T1, the torpedo boat Seeadler, T2 and T3 were ordered to proceed to France. They were attacked enroute by a British light bomber that damaged T2 and forced her to return to Germany for repairs. T1's stay in France was brief and she was ordered to return home a few days later. By November the 1st and 2nd Torpedo Boat Flotillas had transferred to Stavanger, Norway. German aerial reconnaissance had located two coastal convoys in early November that the Kriegsmarine estimated would pass Kinnaird Head, Scotland, during the early morning of 7 November. Both flotillas, consisting of T1 and her sisters, T4, T6, T7, T8, T9 and T10, sailed on 6 November in an attempt to pass through a gap in the British minefields and intercept the convoys around 02:00 the following morning. The British had extended their minefields further north unbeknownst to the Germans and T6 struck a mine shortly after midnight and sank. T7 and T8 rescued the survivors and the operation was abandoned. T1 formed part of the escort for the commerce raider Kormoran through Norwegian waters in early December.

Right elevation and plan of the Type 1935

T1 ran aground off Kristiansand on 22 January 1941 and temporary repairs were made at the shipyard in Horten; the ship was ordered to proceed for permanent repairs at Warnemünde once one engine could be operated, but the repairs were actually made in Gotenhafen and lasted until July. She was reduced to reserve on 15 August that lasted through June 1942. That month, she was recommissioned and assigned to the Torpedo School. In November 1943 the boat began a long refit that lasted through March 1944. In April 1944, the four oldest of the sisters, including T1, were assigned to a training unit as they lacked radar and a reinforced anti-aircraft armament. This arrangement did not last long as the German situation in the east deteriorated and they began convoy escort duties throughout the Baltic a few months later. As of 14 August the 2nd Torpedo Boat Flotilla consisted of nine Type 35s, including T1. She was damaged by an attack by Soviet aircraft while docked in Libau, Latvia, on 9 October. The ship escorted the heavy cruiser Prinz Eugen as the latter ship supported a German counterattack against advancing Soviet forces near Cranz, East Prussia, on 29–30 January 1945. T1 was refitting in Kiel as of March and sank after being hit by two or three bombs during a Royal Air Force attack on Kiel on the night of 9 April with the loss of nine crewmen. Her wreck was demolished on 20 May 1946.
