= German torpedo boat T7 =

German torpedo boat

- Right elevation and plan of the Type 1935

History

Nazi Germany
- Name: T7
- Ordered: 15 January 1936
- Builder: DeSchiMAG, Bremen
- Yard number: 936
- Laid down: 20 August 1937
- Launched: 18 June 1938
- Completed: 20 December 1939
- Fate: Scrapped, 1947–1949

General characteristics (as built)
- Class & type: Type 35 torpedo boat
- Displacement: 859 long tons (873 t) (standard); 1,108 long tons (1,126 t) (deep load)
- Length: 84.3 m (276 ft 7 in) o/a
- Beam: 8.62 m (28 ft 3 in)
- Draft: 2.83 m (9 ft 3 in)
- Installed power: 4 × water-tube boilers; 31,000 shp (23,000 kW)
- Propulsion: 2 × shafts; 2 × geared steam turbines
- Speed: 35 knots (65 km/h; 40 mph)
- Range: 1,200 nmi (2,200 km; 1,400 mi) at 19 knots (35 km/h; 22 mph)
- Complement: 119
- Armament: 1 × single 10.5 cm (4.1 in) gun; 1 × single 3.7 cm (1.5 in) AA guns; 2 × single 2 cm (0.8 in) AA guns; 2 × triple 533 mm (21 in) torpedo tubes; 30–60 mines

The German torpedo boat T7 was one of a dozen Type 35 torpedo boats built for the Kriegsmarine (German Navy) during the late 1930s. Completed in 1939, she was not combat ready until mid-1940 when she spent several months escorting minelayers as they laid minefields in the North Sea and the English Channel. The boat participated in an abortive attempt to attack several convoys off the Scottish coast in November. T7 returned to Germany for a refit in January 1941 and then supported operations in the Baltic Sea after the start of Operation Barbarossa in June. The boat was one of the escorts for several commerce raiders passing through the English Channel in late 1941 and then escorted German ships in Norwegian waters in mid-1942. She was briefly placed in reserve later that year and was then reactivated for service with the Torpedo School. T7 was sunk in an air raid in July 1944, but was refloated several months later. She was never repaired and was scrapped in 1947–1949.

== Design and description ==
The Type 35 was an unsuccessful attempt by the Kriegsmarine to design a fast, ocean-going torpedo boat that did not exceed the 600-long-ton (610 t) displacement limit of the London Naval Treaty for ships that counted against the national tonnage limit. The boats had an overall length of 84.3 meters (276 ft 7 in) and were 82.2 meters (269 ft 8 in) long at the waterline. After the bow was rebuilt in 1941 to improve seaworthiness, the overall length increased to 87.1 meters (285 ft 9 in). The ships had a beam of 8.62 meters (28 ft 3 in), and a mean draft of 2.83 meters (9 ft 3 in) at deep load and displaced 859 metric tons (845 long tons) at standard load and 1,108 metric tons (1,091 long tons) at deep load. Their crew numbered 119 officers and sailors. Their pair of geared steam turbine sets, each driving one propeller, were designed to produce 31,000 shaft horsepower (23,000 kW) using steam from four high-pressure water-tube boilers which would propel the boats at 35 knots (65 km/h; 40 mph). They carried enough fuel oil to give them a range of 1,200 nautical miles (2,200 km; 1,400 mi) at 19 knots (35 km/h; 22 mph).

As built, the Type 35 class mounted a single 10.5 cm (4.1 in) SK C/32 gun on the stern. Anti-aircraft defense was provided by a single 3.7 cm (1.5 in) SK C/30 anti-aircraft gun superfiring over the 10.5 cm gun and a pair of 2 cm (0.8 in) C/30 guns on the bridge wings. They carried six above-water 533 mm (21 in) torpedo tubes in two triple mounts and could also carry 30 mines (or 60 if the weather was good). Many boats exchanged the 3.7 cm gun for another 2 cm gun, depth charges and minesweeping paravanes before completion. Late-war additions were limited to the installation of radar, radar detectors and additional AA guns, usually at the expense of the aft torpedo tube mount.

== Construction and career ==
T7 was ordered on 15 January 1936, from DeSchiMAG, laid down at their Bremen shipyard on 20 August 1937, as yard number 936, launched on 18 June 1938, and commissioned on 20 December 1939. The boat was working up until July 1940, when she began convoy escort duties. Now assigned to the 5th Torpedo Boat Flotilla, T7, her sister ships T2 and T8 and the torpedo boats Kondor, Falke, and Jaguar, escorted minelayers as they laid a minefield in the southwestern North Sea on 7–8 August, and again on 14–15 August. By 31 August, T7 was assigned to the 2nd Torpedo Boat Flotilla with her sisters T5, T6 and T8 as the flotilla escorted minelayers as they laid minefields in the southwestern part of the North Sea from 31 August, to 2 September. The flotilla escorted a minelaying mission in the English Channel on 5–6 September, and then laid minefields itself on 8–9, and 15–16 September, in the Straits of Dover. By November, the 1st and 2nd Torpedo Boat Flotillas had transferred to Stavanger, Norway. German aerial reconnaissance had located two coastal convoys in early November, that the Kriegsmarine estimated would pass Kinnaird Head, Scotland, during the early morning of 7 November. Both flotillas, consisting of T7 and her sisters, T1, T4, T6, T8, T9 and T10, sailed on 6 November, in an attempt to pass through a gap in the British minefields and intercept the convoys around 02:00 (UT) the following morning. The British had extended their minefields further north unbeknownst to the Germans and T6 struck a mine shortly after midnight and sank. T7 and T8 rescued the survivors and the operation was abandoned. T7 began a lengthy refit at Wesermünde in January 1941, that lasted until August.

Upon its completion, the boat was assigned to the Baltic Sea where she escorted, together with her sisters T8 and T11, the light cruisers Leipzig and Emden as they supported German forces invading the Estonian islands of Ösel, Dagö and Muhu (Operation Beowulf) in mid-September. T2, T5, T7, T8 and T11 were among the escorts for the Baltic Fleet, a temporary formation built around the battleship Tirpitz, as it sortied into the Sea of Åland on 23–29 September, to forestall any attempt by the Soviet Red Banner Baltic Fleet to breakout from the Gulf of Finland. Dagö was captured on 12–13 October, after T7 is part of a decoy force used to distract the defenders. On 16 November, T7, T4 and T12 departed Copenhagen, Denmark, en route to Cherbourg, France, to meet the commerce raider Komet. The torpedo boats arrived on 25 November, and Komet reached Cherbourg the following day. The ships departed that night and arrived at Le Havre the following morning, where they waited for night to fall before proceeding. The British had spotted them and they were intercepted by motor torpedo boats (MTB) on 28 November, between Boulogne and Dunkirk. In a very confused night action, T7 was machine-gunned by one of the MTBs, losing three dead and three wounded. On 3 December, T4, T7 and the torpedo boat T14 rendezvoused with the commerce raider Thor and T2 and T12 in the Schillig Roads. Later that day, they began to escort Thor through the Channel. Delayed by heavy fog, the ships did not reach Brest, France, until the 15 December, while Thor continued onwards into the Atlantic. T7 and T12 sailed for Germany on 17 December, where the former was to begin another refit at Wesermünde.

The boat was transferred to Norway in April 1942, and escorted the heavy cruiser Admiral Scheer and the replenishment oiler Dithmarschen from Trondheim to Narvik on 9–10 May, together with T5. During the beginning stages of Operation Rösselsprung, T7 and the torpedo boat T15 were among the escorts for Tirpitz and the heavy cruiser Admiral Hipper as they sailed from Trondheim to Altafjord in early July. The pair of torpedo boats screen the damaged heavy cruiser Lützow from Narvik to Trondheim during 8–10 July. T7 was briefly refitted in East Prussia in August–September, before she was reduced to reserve for the rest of the year. The boat was recommissioned for service as a training ship with the Torpedo School in January 1943, and then began a refit at Bremen in May 1944. On 29 July 1944, T7 was sunk by American bombers attacking Bremen. She was refloated on 25 October, but was not repaired. The boat may have been sunk again on 30 April 1945, if so she was salvaged again and scrapped between December 1947, and June 1949.
