= German torpedo boat T10 =

German torpedo boat

- Right elevation and plan of the Type 1935

History

Nazi Germany
- Name: T10
- Ordered: 29 June 1936
- Builder: Schichau, Elbing, East Prussia
- Yard number: 1394
- Laid down: 24 November 1936
- Launched: 19 January 1939
- Completed: 5 August 1940
- Fate: Sunk by aircraft, 18 December 1944

General characteristics (as built)
- Class & type: Type 35 torpedo boat
- Displacement: 859 long tons (873 t) (standard); 1,108 long tons (1,126 t) (deep load)
- Length: 84.3 m (276 ft 7 in) o/a
- Beam: 8.62 m (28 ft 3 in)
- Draft: 2.83 m (9 ft 3 in)
- Installed power: 4 × water-tube boilers; 31,000 shp (23,000 kW)
- Propulsion: 2 × shafts; 2 × geared steam turbines
- Speed: 35 knots (65 km/h; 40 mph)
- Range: 1,200 nmi (2,200 km; 1,400 mi) at 19 knots (35 km/h; 22 mph)
- Complement: 119
- Armament: 1 × single 10.5 cm (4.1 in) gun; 1 × single 3.7 cm (1.5 in) AA guns; 2 × single 2 cm (0.8 in) AA guns; 2 × triple 533 mm (21 in) torpedo tubes; 30–60 mines

The German torpedo boat T10 was one of a dozen Type 35 torpedo boats built for the Kriegsmarine (German Navy) during the late 1930s. Completed in mid-1940, the boat participated in an abortive attempt to attack several convoys off the Scottish coast in November. T10 was placed in reserve in April 1941 and was reactivated in June 1942 for service in Occupied France. The boat laid several minefields in the English Channel and badly damaged during an attempt to escort a commerce raider through the Channel. After repairs, she was reduced to reserve again and was then assigned to the Torpedo School in mid-1943. In May 1944 the boat returned to active duty and was assigned to the Baltic Sea area. Twice damaged by Soviet aircraft later in the year, T10 was sunk during a British air raid in mid-December.

== Design and description ==
The Type 35 was an unsuccessful attempt by the Kriegsmarine to design a fast, ocean-going torpedo boat that did not exceed the 600-long-ton (610 t) displacement limit of the London Naval Treaty for ships that counted against the national tonnage limit. The boats had an overall length of 84.3 meters (276 ft 7 in) and were 82.2 meters (269 ft 8 in) long at the waterline. After the bow was rebuilt in 1941 to improve seaworthiness, the overall length increased to 87.1 meters (285 ft 9 in). The ships had a beam of 8.62 meters (28 ft 3 in), and a mean draft of 2.83 meters (9 ft 3 in) at deep load and displaced 859 metric tons (845 long tons) at standard load and 1,108 metric tons (1,091 long tons) at deep load. Their crew numbered 119 officers and sailors. Their pair of geared steam turbine sets, each driving one propeller, were designed to produce 31,000 shaft horsepower (23,000 kW) using steam from four high-pressure water-tube boilers which would propel the boats at 35 knots (65 km/h; 40 mph). They carried enough fuel oil to give them a range of 1,200 nautical miles (2,200 km; 1,400 mi) at 19 knots (35 km/h; 22 mph).

As built, the Type 35 class mounted a single 10.5 cm (4.1 in) SK C/32 gun on the stern. Anti-aircraft defense was provided by a single 3.7 cm (1.5 in) SK C/30 anti-aircraft gun superfiring over the 10.5 cm gun and a pair of 2 cm (0.8 in) C/30 guns on the bridge wings. They carried six above-water 533 mm (21 in) torpedo tubes in two triple mounts and could also carry 30 mines (or 60 if the weather was good). Many boats exchanged the 3.7 cm gun for another 2 cm gun, depth charges and minesweeping paravanes before completion. Late-war additions were limited to the installation of radar, radar detectors and additional AA guns, usually at the expense of the aft torpedo tube mount.

== Construction and career ==
T10 was ordered on 29 June 1936 from Schichau, laid down at their Elbing, East Prussia, shipyard on 24 November 1936 as yard number 1394, launched on 19 January 1939 and commissioned on 5 August 1940. The boat was working up until September when she began convoy escort duties in the Baltic Sea. By November T10 had transferred to Norway. German aerial reconnaissance had located two coastal convoys in early November that the Kriegsmarine estimated would pass Kinnaird Head, Scotland, during the early morning of 7 November. Both the 1st and 2nd Torpedo Boat Flotillas, consisting of T10 and her sisters, T1, T4, T6, T7, T8 and T9, sailed on 6 November in an attempt to pass through a gap in the British minefields and intercept the convoys around 02:00 the following morning. The British had extended their minefields further north unbeknownst to the Germans and T6 struck a mine shortly after midnight and sank. T7 and T8 rescued the survivors and the operation was abandoned. T10 began a refit in March in Kiel that lasted until July. The boat was reduced to reserve on 15 August.

She was recommissioned on 13 May 1942 and was working up until July when she was transferred to France, where T10 was assigned to the 3rd Torpedo Boat Flotilla. On 20–22 July the flotilla, consisting of T10, T4, and the torpedo boats T13 and T14, laid two minefields in the English Channel. T10, T13 and T14 laid another minefield in the Channel on 1–2 August. The same three boats escorted the replenishment oiler Ermland as she made an unsuccessful attempt to breakout into the Atlantic through the Bay of Biscay on 8–11 August. The flotilla, now consisting of T10, T4, T14 and the torpedo boat T19 made an unsuccessful attempt to escort the commerce raider Komet through the Channel on 13–14 October. They were intercepted by a British force of five escort destroyers and eight MTBs that sank the raider and severely damaged T10. She was hit six times that reduced her speed to eight knots (15 km/h; 9.2 mph), set her on fire, and blew up one of her depth charges. Eleven men were killed and an equal number were wounded. When the boat returned to Germany in December, she was again reduced to reserve.

T10 was recommissioned in May 1943 and briefly assigned to the Torpedo School as a training ship before becoming the senior officer's ship of the 25th U-boat Flotilla on 10 July. She was reassigned to the Torpedo School in September. The boat was refitted from February to April 1944 and then returned to active duty in the Baltic Sea area. T10 was assigned to the 2nd Torpedo Boat Flotilla and participated in a failed attempt to recapture the island of Narvi on 27/28 June together with T8, the torpedo boat T30 and Finnish forces. The three torpedo boats damaged a Soviet patrol boat off Narva, Estonia on 16 July. T10 was damaged during a Soviet air raid on Libau, Latvia, on 28 November and was then damaged again by a near miss on 15 December. She sailed to Gotenhafen for repairs and was in a floating drydock when the Royal Air Force bombed the port on 18 December. The drydock was damaged so that it sank at the bows and to port which threw the torpedo boat sideways with her superstructure touching the side of the drydock. Then several bombs struck between T10's hull and the side of the drydock, blowing holes in the hull which slowly flooded both boiler rooms, the forward turbine room. The boat now had a 20° list and was down by the bows 10°. The bow was dry and the aft end was still supported by the damaged drydock when the latter broke in half. Despite a salvage ship coming alongside to pump out the water, the flooding could not be contained and T10 sank early the following morning. Lack of resources prevented her from being refloated.
