= German torpedo boat T15 =

German torpedo boat

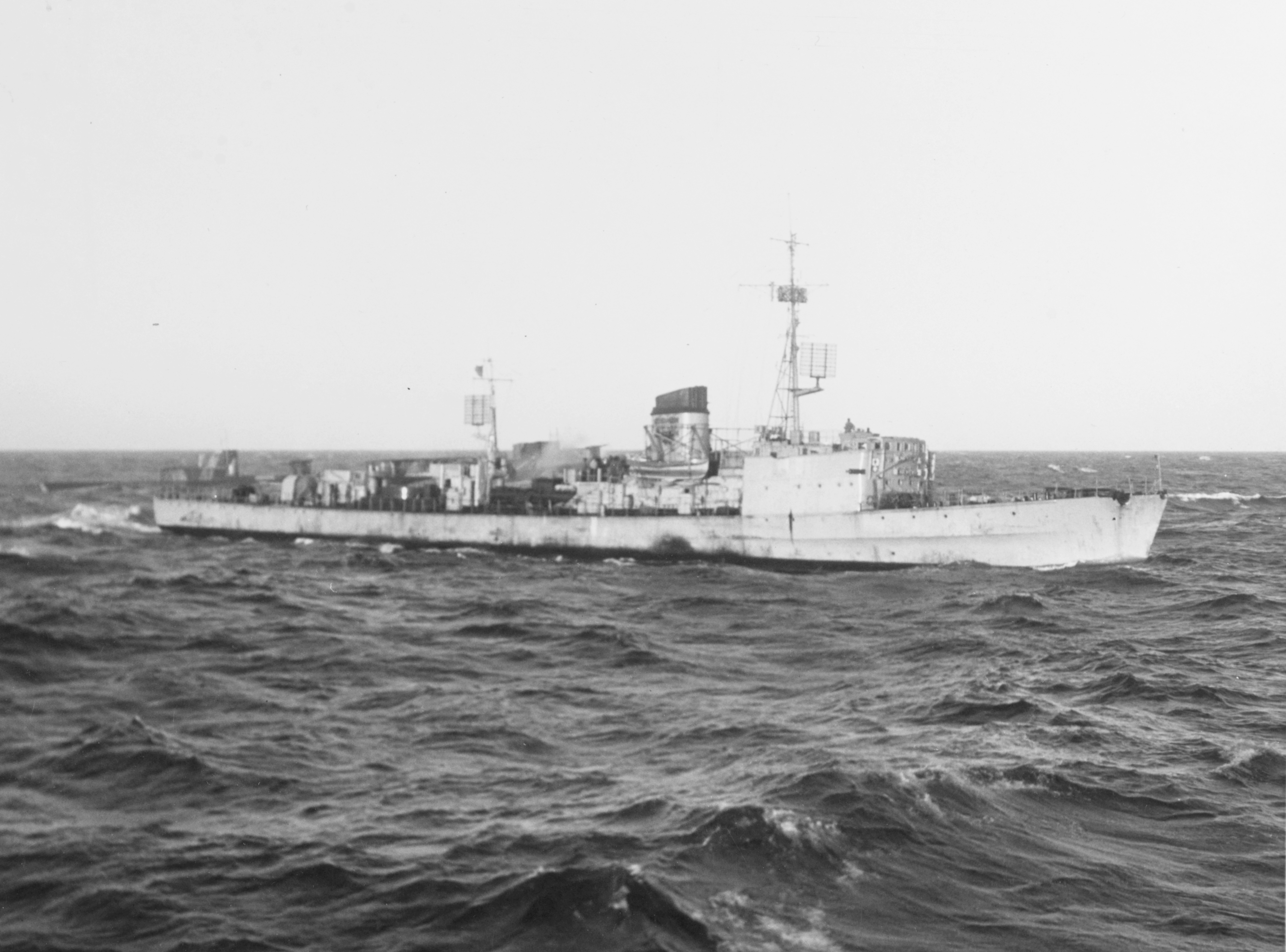
- Sister ship T21 at sea, 2 July 1946, en route to be scuttled with her load of poison gas

History

Nazi Germany
- Name: T15
- Ordered: 18 September 1937
- Builder: Schichau, Elbing, East Prussia
- Yard number: 1403
- Laid down: 3 January 1939
- Launched: 16 September 1939
- Completed: 26 June 1941
- Fate: Sunk by aircraft, 13 December 1943

General characteristics (as built)
- Class & type: Type 37 torpedo boat
- Displacement: 888 t (874 long tons) (standard); 1,139 t (1,121 long tons) (deep load)
- Length: 85.2 m (279 ft 6 in) o/a
- Beam: 8.87 m (29 ft 1 in)
- Draft: 2.8 m (9 ft 2 in)
- Installed power: 4 × water-tube boilers; 31,000 shp (23,000 kW)
- Propulsion: 2 × shafts; 2 × geared steam turbine sets
- Speed: 35 knots (65 km/h; 40 mph)
- Range: 1,600 nmi (3,000 km; 1,800 mi) at 19 knots (35 km/h; 22 mph)
- Complement: 119
- Armament: 1 × single 10.5 cm (4.1 in) gun; 1 × single 3.7 cm (1.5 in) AA gun; 2 × single 2 cm (0.8 in) AA guns; 2 × triple 533 mm (21 in) torpedo tubes; 30–60 mines

The German torpedo boat T15 was one of nine Type 37 torpedo boats built for the Kriegsmarine (German Navy) during World War II. Completed in mid-1941, the ship was transferred to Occupied France in December. She helped to escort a pair of battleships and a heavy cruiser through the English Channel back to Germany in February 1942 in the Channel Dash and then was ordered to Norway for escort work. T15 returned to Germany in August where she was assigned to the Torpedo School and U-boat Flotillas as a training ship. The ship was sunk by American bombers in December 1943.

== Design and description ==
The Type 37 torpedo boat was a slightly improved version of the preceding Type 35 with better range. The boats had an overall length of 85.2 meters (279 ft 6 in) and were 82 meters (269 ft 0 in) long at the waterline. The ships had a beam of 8.87 meters (29 ft 1 in), and a mean draft of 2.8 meters (9 ft 2 in) at deep load and displaced 888 metric tons (874 long tons) at standard load and 1,139 metric tons (1,121 long tons) at deep load. Their crew numbered 119 officers and sailors. The Type 37s were equipped with a pair of geared steam turbine sets, each driving one propeller, that were designed to produce 31,000 shaft horsepower (23,000 kW) using steam from four high-pressure water-tube boilers which would give them a speed of 35 knots (65 km/h; 40 mph). The ships carried enough fuel oil to give them a range of 1,600 nautical miles (3,000 km; 1,800 mi) at 19 knots (35 km/h; 22 mph).

As built, the Type 37 class mounted a single 10.5 cm (4.1 in) SK C/32 gun on the stern. Anti-aircraft defense was provided by a single 3.7 cm (1.5 in) SK C/30 anti-aircraft gun superfiring over the 10.5 cm gun and a pair of 2 cm (0.8 in) C/30 guns on the bridge wings. They carried six above-water 533 mm (21.0 in) torpedo tubes in two triple mounts and could also carry 30 mines (or 60 if the weather was good).

=== Modifications ===
Early-war modifications to the Type 37s were limited to the conversion of the foremast into a tripod mast, installation of a FuM 28 (Note: German: Funkmess-Ortung (Radio-direction finder, active ranging)) radar with fixed antennas angled 45° to each side and a 2 cm gun superfiring over the main gun. Ships participating in the Channel Dash in February 1942 were ordered to have their aft torpedo tube mount replaced by a quadruple 2 cm gun mount, but it is not certain if this was actually done. Confirmed deliveries of this mount began in May when they were installed in the superfiring position, but T15's anti-aircraft suite is unknown when she was sunk at the end of 1943.

== Construction and career ==
T15 was ordered on 18 September 1937 from Schichau, laid down at their Elbing, East Prussia, shipyard on 3 January 1939 as yard number 1403, launched on 16 September 1939 and commissioned on 26 June 1941; construction was delayed by shortages of skilled labor and of raw materials. Working up until December, she was then transferred to France. On the morning of 12 February 1942, the 2nd Torpedo Boat Flotilla (with T2, T4, T5, T11, T12) and the 3rd Torpedo Boat Flotilla (with T15 and her sisters T13, T16, and T17) rendezvoused with the battleships Gneisenau and Scharnhorst and the heavy cruiser Prinz Eugen to escort them through the Channel to Germany in the Channel Dash. The following month, T15, T16, and T17 were transferred to Norway where they formed part of the escort of the heavy cruiser Admiral Hipper to Trondheim on 19–21 March. T15 helped to escort the heavy cruiser Lützow from Kristiansand to Trondheim on 18–20 May. During the beginning stages of Operation Rösselsprung, T15 and the torpedo boat T7 were among the escorts for the battleship Tirpitz and Admiral Hipper as they sailed from Trondheim to Altafjord in early July.

Returning to Germany in August, T15 was briefly assigned to the Torpedo School as a training ship in October before beginning a refit in October at the Oderwerke shipyard in Stettin that lasted until February 1943. She briefly rejoined the Torpedo School in April before beginning another refit in July–August. Following its completion, the boat was assigned to U-boat flotillas in the Baltic as a training ship. T15 was sunk by American bombers in Kiel on 13 December.
