= German torpedo boat T11 =

German torpedo boat

- Right elevation and plan of the Type 1935

History

Nazi Germany
- Name: T11
- Ordered: 29 June 1936
- Builder: DeSchiMAG, Bremen
- Yard number: 938
- Laid down: 1 July 1938
- Launched: 1 March 1939
- Completed: 24 May 1940
- Fate: Scrapped, 1951

General characteristics (as built)
- Class & type: Type 35 torpedo boat
- Displacement: 859 long tons (873 t) (standard); 1,108 long tons (1,126 t) (deep load)
- Length: 84.3 m (276 ft 7 in) o/a
- Beam: 8.62 m (28 ft 3 in)
- Draft: 2.83 m (9 ft 3 in)
- Installed power: 4 × water-tube boilers; 31,000 shp (23,000 kW)
- Propulsion: 2 × shafts; 2 × geared steam turbines
- Speed: 35 knots (65 km/h; 40 mph)
- Range: 1,200 nmi (2,200 km; 1,400 mi) at 19 knots (35 km/h; 22 mph)
- Complement: 119
- Armament: 1 × single 10.5 cm (4.1 in) gun; 1 × single 3.7 cm (1.5 in) AA guns; 2 × single 2 cm (0.8 in) AA guns; 2 × triple 533 mm (21 in) torpedo tubes; 30–60 mines

The German torpedo boat T11 was one of a dozen Type 35 torpedo boats built for the Kriegsmarine (German Navy) during the late 1930s. Completed in mid-1940, the boat was deployed in the English Channel later that year and returned to Germany in December. She then supported operations in the Baltic Sea after the start of Operation Barbarossa in June. T11 was transferred to France at the end of the year and helped to escort a pair of battleships and a heavy cruiser through the Channel back to Germany in the Channel Dash in early 1942. She then escorted German ships in Norwegian waters for several months and was placed in reserve when she returned to Germany. The boat spent all of 1943 and 1944 either refitting or assigned to the Torpedo School. T11 returned to active duty at the beginning of 1945 and survived the war. The boat was allocated to the British after the war, but she was transferred to France in 1946. Unused by the French Navy, she was stricken from the Navy List in 1951 and subsequently scrapped.

== Design and description ==
The Type 35 was an unsuccessful attempt by the Kriegsmarine to design a fast, ocean-going torpedo boat that did not exceed the 600-long-ton (610 t) displacement limit of the London Naval Treaty for ships that counted against the national tonnage limit. The boats had an overall length of 84.3 meters (276 ft 7 in) and were 82.2 meters (269 ft 8 in) long at the waterline. After the bow was rebuilt in 1941 to improve seaworthiness, the overall length increased to 87.1 meters (285 ft 9 in). The ships had a beam of 8.62 meters (28 ft 3 in), and a mean draft of 2.83 meters (9 ft 3 in) at deep load and displaced 859 metric tons (845 long tons) at standard load and 1,108 metric tons (1,091 long tons) at deep load. Their crew numbered 119 officers and sailors. Their pair of geared steam turbine sets, each driving one propeller, were designed to produce 31,000 shaft horsepower (23,000 kW) using steam from four high-pressure water-tube boilers which would propel the boats at 35 knots (65 km/h; 40 mph). They carried enough fuel oil to give them a range of 1,200 nautical miles (2,200 km; 1,400 mi) at 19 knots (35 km/h; 22 mph).

As built, the Type 35 class mounted a single 10.5 cm (4.1 in) SK C/32 gun on the stern. Anti-aircraft defense was provided by a single 3.7 cm (1.5 in) SK C/30 anti-aircraft gun superfiring over the 10.5 cm gun and a pair of 2 cm (0.8 in) C/30 guns on the bridge wings. They carried six above-water 533 mm (21 in) torpedo tubes in two triple mounts and could also carry 30 mines (or 60 if the weather was good). Many boats exchanged the 3.7 cm gun for another 2 cm gun, depth charges and minesweeping paravanes before completion. Late-war additions were limited to the installation of radar, radar detectors and additional AA guns, usually at the expense of the aft torpedo tube mount.

== Construction and career ==
T11 was ordered on 29 June 1936 from DeSchiMAG, laid down at their Bremen shipyard on 1 July 1938 as yard number 938, launched on 1 March 1939 and commissioned on 24 May 1940. The boat was working up until July when she was transferred to the Skaggerak for convoy escort duties. On 18 September, T11 was slightly damaged by bomb splinters when the Royal Air Force bombed Cherbourg, France. Several of her crew were wounded during the attack. She returned to Germany in December and was decommissioned for repairs that lasted until June 1941. The boat was recommissioned and assigned to the Baltic Sea where she escorted, together with her sister ships T7 and T8, the light cruisers Leipzig and Emden as they supported German forces invading the Estonian islands of Ösel, Dagö and Muhu (Operation Beowulf) in mid-September. T11 and her sisters T2, T5, T7, and T8 were among the escorts for the Baltic Fleet, a temporary formation built around the battleship Tirpitz, as it sortied into the Sea of Åland on 23–29 September, to forestall any attempt by the Soviet Red Banner Baltic Fleet to breakout from the Gulf of Finland.

The boat was transferred to France around the beginning of 1942. As part of the preparations for the Channel Dash, the Kriegsmarine substituted a quadruple 2 cm mount for T11's aft torpedo tubes and added a 2 cm single mount at the bow to reinforce the boat's anti-aircraft suite. On the morning of 12 February 1942, the 2nd and 3rd Torpedo Boat Flotillas (with T2, T4, T5, T11, T12 and T13, T15, T16, and T17 respectively) rendezvoused with the battleships Gneisenau and Scharnhorst and the heavy cruiser Prinz Eugen to escort them through the Channel to Germany. T11's torpedo tubes were replaced afterwards, although the quadruple mounting may have been moved to the aft superfiring position and she also may have kept her bow-chaser. She was transferred to Norway the following month and was one of the escorts for the badly damaged Prinz Eugen from Trondheim to Kiel on 16–18 May (Operation Zauberflote (Magic Flute)), together with T12 and the destroyers Z25 and Z5 Paul Jacobi. T11 returned to Germany that month and was placed in reserve until the end of the year.

The boat was recommissioned in January 1943 and was assigned to the Torpedo School in April. She began a refit in mid-1944 that lasted until December when she was assigned to the 3rd Torpedo Boat Flotilla in the Baltic. On 2 April 1945, T11 was involved in a collision with the minesweeper R 256 east of Bornholm Island, which was sunk by Soviet aircraft later that day. The torpedo boat was allocated to the British when the Allies divided the surviving ships of the Kriegsmarine amongst themselves in late 1945. The Royal Navy had no interest in her and she was transferred to France in February 1946 and was renamed Bir Hacheim on 4 February. The boat was immediately placed in reserve until she was stricken on 8 October 1951 and subsequently scrapped.
