= German torpedo boat T5 =

German torpedo boat

- Right elevation and plan of the Type 1935

History

Nazi Germany
- Name: T5
- Ordered: 15 January 1936
- Builder: DeSchiMAG, Bremen
- Yard number: 934
- Laid down: 30 December 1936
- Launched: 22 November 1937
- Completed: 23 January 1940
- Fate: Sunk by mine, 14 March 1945

General characteristics (as built)
- Class & type: Type 35 torpedo boat
- Displacement: 859 long tons (873 t) (standard); 1,108 long tons (1,126 t) (deep load)
- Length: 84.3 m (276 ft 7 in) o/a
- Beam: 8.62 m (28 ft 3 in)
- Draft: 2.83 m (9 ft 3 in)
- Installed power: 4 × water-tube boilers; 31,000 shp (23,000 kW)
- Propulsion: 2 × shafts; 2 × geared steam turbines
- Speed: 35 knots (65 km/h; 40 mph)
- Range: 1,200 nmi (2,200 km; 1,400 mi) at 19 knots (35 km/h; 22 mph)
- Complement: 119
- Armament: 1 × single 10.5 cm (4.1 in) gun; 1 × single 3.7 cm (1.5 in) AA guns; 2 × single 2 cm (0.8 in) AA guns; 2 × triple 533 mm (21 in) torpedo tubes; 30–60 mines

The German torpedo boat T5 was one of a dozen Type 35 torpedo boats built for the Kriegsmarine (German Navy) during the late 1930s. Completed in 1940, she was assigned escort duties in June–July before she was tasked to escort minelayers as they laid their minefields in the North Sea and English Channel in August and September. T5 was transferred to Norway by November and escorted minelaying missions and supported operations in the Baltic Sea after the start of Operation Barbarossa in June 1941. T5 returned to France at the end of the year and then escorted a pair of battleships and a heavy cruiser through the Channel back to Germany in early 1942 in the Channel Dash.

The boat was transferred back to Norway upon her return and resumed her escort duties there before beginning a refit. Upon its completion T5 was assigned to escort convoys in the Baltic Sea until she was transferred back to France in early 1943 where she helped to escort blockade runners and U-boats through the Bay of Biscay and lay minefields. The boat returned to Germany and was assigned to the Torpedo School in mid-1943. She returned to active duty in late 1944 and escorted German ships as they bombarded Soviet positions. T5 struck a mine in March 1945 and sank with few casualties.

== Design and description ==
The Type 35 was an unsuccessful attempt by the Kriegsmarine to design a fast, ocean-going torpedo boat that did not exceed the 600-long-ton (610 t) displacement limit of the London Naval Treaty for ships that counted against the national tonnage limit. The boats had an overall length of 84.3 meters (276 ft 7 in) and were 82.2 meters (269 ft 8 in) long at the waterline. After the bow was rebuilt in 1941 to improve seaworthiness, the overall length increased to 87.1 meters (285 ft 9 in). The ships had a beam of 8.62 meters (28 ft 3 in), and a mean draft of 2.83 meters (9 ft 3 in) at deep load and displaced 859 metric tons (845 long tons) at standard load and 1,108 metric tons (1,091 long tons) at deep load. Their crew numbered 119 officers and sailors. Their pair of geared steam turbine sets, each driving one propeller, were designed to produce 31,000 shaft horsepower (23,000 kW) using steam from four high-pressure water-tube boilers which would propel the boats at 35 knots (65 km/h; 40 mph). They carried enough fuel oil to give them a range of 1,200 nautical miles (2,200 km; 1,400 mi) at 19 knots (35 km/h; 22 mph).

As built, the Type 35 class mounted a single 10.5 cm (4.1 in) SK C/32 gun on the stern. Anti-aircraft defense was provided by a single 3.7 cm (1.5 in) SK C/30 anti-aircraft gun superfiring over the 10.5 cm gun and a pair of 2 cm (0.8 in) C/30 guns on the bridge wings. They carried six above-water 533 mm (21 in) torpedo tubes in two triple mounts and could also carry 30 mines (or 60 if the weather was good). Many boats exchanged the 3.7 cm gun for another 2 cm gun, depth charges and minesweeping paravanes before completion. Late-war additions were limited to the installation of radar, radar detectors and additional AA guns, usually at the expense of the aft torpedo tube mount.

== Construction and career ==
T5 was ordered on 15 January 1936 from DeSchiMAG, laid down at their Bremen shipyard on 30 December 1936 as yard number 934, launched on 22 November 1937 and commissioned on 23 January 1940. The boat was working up until June when she was transferred to the Skaggerak for convoy escort duties. From 25–28 July, T5 was one of the escorts for the badly damaged battleship Gneisenau from Trondheim, Norway to Kiel, Germany. By 31 August T5 was assigned to the 2nd Torpedo Boat Flotilla with her sister ships T6, T7 and T8 as the flotilla escorted minelayers as they laid minefields in the southwestern part of the North Sea from 31 August to 2 September. The flotilla escorted a minelaying mission in the English Channel on 5–6 September and then laid minefields itself on 8–9 and 15–16 September in the Straits of Dover. By November the 1st and 2nd Torpedo Boat Flotillas had transferred to Stavanger, Norway and T5 was one of the escorts for a minelaying mission off Stavanger on the night of 27/28 January 1941 together with her sisters T9 and T12 and the minesweepers M15 and M22. T5 began a refit in March in Bremen that lasted until September.

Along with her sisters T2, T8 and T11, the boat supported German forces invading the Estonian islands of Ösel, Dagö and Muhu (Operation Beowulf) in mid-September. T2, T5, T7, T8 and T11 were among the escorts for the Baltic Fleet, a temporary formation built around the battleship Tirpitz, as it sortied into the Sea of Åland on 23–29 September to forestall any attempt by the Soviet Red Banner Baltic Fleet to breakout from the Gulf of Finland. Dagö was captured on 12–13 October after T5 is part of a decoy force used to distract the defenders. She went to France in January 1942 and rejoined the 2nd Torpedo Boat Flotilla. On the morning of 12 February, the 2nd and 3rd Torpedo Boat Flotillas (with T2, T4, T5, T11, T12 and T13, T15, T16, and T17 respectively) rendezvoused with the battleships Gneisenau and Scharnhorst and the heavy cruiser Prinz Eugen to escort them through the Channel to Germany in the Channel Dash. After arriving in Germany, T5 and T12 were transferred to Norway for escort duties. On 6 March they briefly screened Tirpitz as she searched for the Russia-bound Convoy PQ 12. T5 and T7 escorted the heavy cruiser Admiral Scheer and the replenishment oiler Dithmarschen from Trondheim to Narvik on 9–10 May. T5 was refitted in East Prussia from August to November and then remained in the Baltic Sea on escort duties until March 1943.

She was transferred to France the following month. Although escorted by T2, T5, and the torpedo boats Kondor, T22 and T23, the Italian blockade runner Himalaya failed in her attempt to break through the Bay of Biscay when she was spotted by British aircraft and forced to return by heavy aerial attacks on 9–11 April. On 5–8 May, the 2nd Torpedo Boat Flotilla with T2, T5 and the torpedo boats T18 and T22 laid three minefields in the Channel. The following month the ships returned to the Bay of Biscay to help escort U-boats through the Bay. T5, T2 and T18 arrived back in Germany on 1 July and T5 began an engine overhaul at Wesermünde. She was transferred to the Torpedo School as a training ship in October and then began a lengthy refit from March to August 1944. Rejoining the 2nd Flotilla, now consisting of T5, T3, T9, T12, T13 and T16, the flotilla screened Admiral Scheer as she shelled Soviet positions during the evacuation of Sworbe, on the island of Ösel, on the night of 23/24 November. While escorting a convoy near Hela, East Prussia, T5 and T3 struck mines laid by the Soviet submarine L-21 on 14 March 1945 and sank at 54°39′N 18°47′E with the loss of 20 crewmen aboard T5.
