= German torpedo boat T8 =

German torpedo boat

- Right elevation and plan of the Type 1935

History

Nazi Germany
- Name: T8
- Ordered: 15 January 1936
- Builder: DeSchiMAG, Bremen
- Yard number: 937
- Laid down: 28 August 1937
- Launched: 10 August 1938
- Completed: 8 October 1939
- Fate: Sunk by aircraft, 3 May 1945

General characteristics (as built)
- Class & type: Type 35 torpedo boat
- Displacement: 859 long tons (873 t) (standard); 1,108 long tons (1,126 t) (deep load)
- Length: 84.3 m (276 ft 7 in) o/a
- Beam: 8.62 m (28 ft 3 in)
- Draft: 2.83 m (9 ft 3 in)
- Installed power: 4 × water-tube boilers; 31,000 shp (23,000 kW)
- Propulsion: 2 × shafts; 2 × geared steam turbines
- Speed: 35 knots (65 km/h; 40 mph)
- Range: 1,200 nmi (2,200 km; 1,400 mi) at 19 knots (35 km/h; 22 mph)
- Complement: 119
- Armament: 1 × single 10.5 cm (4.1 in) gun; 1 × single 3.7 cm (1.5 in) AA guns; 2 × single 2 cm (0.8 in) AA guns; 2 × triple 533 mm (21 in) torpedo tubes; 30–60 mines

The German torpedo boat T8 was one of a dozen Type 35 torpedo boats built for the Kriegsmarine (German Navy) during the late 1930s. Completed in 1939, she was not combat ready until mid-1940 when she spent several months escorting minelayers as they laid minefields in the North Sea and the English Channel. The boat participated in an abortive attempt to attack several convoys off the Scottish coast in November. T8 returned to Germany for a refit in January 1941 and then supported operations in the Baltic Sea after the start of Operation Barbarossa in June. She was briefly placed in reserve at the end of the year and was then reactivated for service with the Torpedo School. In February 1944 the boat returned to active duty and was assigned to the Baltic Sea area where she supported German operations. T8 escorted a bombardment mission in February 1945 and was sunk by British aircraft on 3 May.

== Design and description ==
The Type 35 was an unsuccessful attempt by the Kriegsmarine to design a fast, ocean-going torpedo boat that did not exceed the 600-long-ton (610 t) displacement limit of the London Naval Treaty for ships that counted against the national tonnage limit. The boats had an overall length of 84.3 meters (276 ft 7 in) and were 82.2 meters (269 ft 8 in) long at the waterline. After the bow was rebuilt in 1941 to improve seaworthiness, the overall length increased to 87.1 meters (285 ft 9 in). The ships had a beam of 8.62 meters (28 ft 3 in), and a mean draft of 2.83 meters (9 ft 3 in) at deep load and displaced 859 metric tons (845 long tons) at standard load and 1,108 metric tons (1,091 long tons) at deep load. Their crew numbered 119 officers and sailors. Their pair of geared steam turbine sets, each driving one propeller, were designed to produce 31,000 shaft horsepower (23,000 kW) using steam from four high-pressure water-tube boilers which would propel the boats at 35 knots (65 km/h; 40 mph). They carried enough fuel oil to give them a range of 1,200 nautical miles (2,200 km; 1,400 mi) at 19 knots (35 km/h; 22 mph).

As built, the Type 35 class mounted a single 10.5 cm (4.1 in) SK C/32 gun on the stern. Anti-aircraft defense was provided by a single 3.7 cm (1.5 in) SK C/30 anti-aircraft gun superfiring over the 10.5 cm gun and a pair of 2 cm (0.8 in) C/30 guns on the bridge wings. They carried six above-water 533 mm (21 in) torpedo tubes in two triple mounts and could also carry 30 mines (or 60 if the weather was good). Many boats exchanged the 3.7 cm gun for another 2 cm gun, depth charges and minesweeping paravanes before completion. Late-war additions were limited to the installation of radar, radar detectors and additional AA guns, usually at the expense of the aft torpedo tube mount.

== Construction and career ==
T8 was ordered on 15 January 1936 from DeSchiMAG, laid down at their Bremen shipyard on 28 August 1937 as yard number 937, launched on 10 August 1938 and commissioned on 5 August 1940. The boat was working up until August when she was transferred west. Now assigned to the 5th Torpedo Boat Flotilla, T8, her sister ships T2 and T7 and the torpedo boats Kondor, Falke, and Jaguar, escorted minelayers as they laid a minefield in the southwestern North Sea on 7–8 August and again on 14–15 August. By 31 August T8 was assigned to the 2nd Torpedo Boat Flotilla with her sisters T5, T6 and T7 as the flotilla escorted minelayers as they laid minefields in the southwestern part of the North Sea from 31 August to 2 September. The flotilla escorted a minelaying mission in the English Channel on 5–6 September and then laid minefields itself on 8–9 and 15–16 September in the Straits of Dover. By November the 1st and 2nd Torpedo Boat Flotillas had transferred to Stavanger, Norway. German aerial reconnaissance had located two coastal convoys in early November that the Kriegsmarine estimated would pass Kinnaird Head, Scotland, during the early morning of 7 November. Both flotillas, consisting of T8 and her sisters, T1, T4, T6, T7, T9 and T10, sailed on 6 November in an attempt to pass through a gap in the British minefields and intercept the convoys around 02:00 the following morning. The British had extended their minefields further north unbeknownst to the Germans and T6 struck a mine shortly after midnight and sank. T7 and T8 rescued the survivors and the operation was abandoned. T8 began a lengthy refit at Stettin in January 1941 that lasted until June.

Together with her sisters T5, T7 and T11, the boat supported German forces invading the Estonian islands of Ösel, Dagö and Muhu (Operation Beowulf) in mid-September. T2, T5, T7, T8 and T11 were among the escorts for the Baltic Fleet, a temporary formation built around the battleship Tirpitz, as it sortied into the Sea of Åland on 23–29 September to forestall any attempt by the Soviet Red Banner Baltic Fleet to breakout from the Gulf of Finland. Dagö was captured on 12–13 October after T8 is part of a decoy force used to distract the defenders. Manpower shortages forced the boat to be reduced to reserve in December. The boat was recommissioned for service, probably as a training ship with the Torpedo School, in July 1942 and then began a refit at Elbing, East Prussia, in October 1943 that lasted until January 1944. Afterwards, she was assigned to the 2nd Torpedo Boat Flotilla and participated in a failed attempt to recapture the island of Narvi on 27/28 June together with T10, the torpedo boat T30 and Finnish forces. The three torpedo boats damaged a Soviet patrol boat off Narva, Estonia, on 16 July. T8 screened the heavy cruiser Lützow as she bombarded Soviet positions near Frauenburg on 8 February 1945. She was sunk by British aircraft on 3 May in the Kieler Förde. Her wreck was demolished by depth charges on 10 December.
