= German torpedo boat T6 =

German torpedo boat

- Right elevation and plan of the Type 1935

History

Nazi Germany
- Name: T6
- Ordered: 15 January 1936
- Builder: DeSchiMAG, Bremen
- Yard number: 935
- Laid down: 3 January 1937
- Launched: 16 December 1937
- Completed: 30 April 1940
- Fate: Sunk by mine, 7 November 1940

General characteristics (as built)
- Class & type: Type 35 torpedo boat
- Displacement: 859 long tons (873 t) (standard); 1,108 long tons (1,126 t) (deep load)
- Length: 84.3 m (276 ft 7 in) o/a
- Beam: 8.62 m (28 ft 3 in)
- Draft: 2.83 m (9 ft 3 in)
- Installed power: 4 × water-tube boilers; 31,000 shp (23,000 kW)
- Propulsion: 2 × shafts; 2 × geared steam turbines
- Speed: 35 knots (65 km/h; 40 mph)
- Range: 1,200 nmi (2,200 km; 1,400 mi) at 19 knots (35 km/h; 22 mph)
- Complement: 119
- Armament: 1 × single 10.5 cm (4.1 in) gun; 1 × single 3.7 cm (1.5 in) AA guns; 2 × single 2 cm (0.8 in) AA guns; 2 × triple 533 mm (21 in) torpedo tubes; 30–60 mines

The German torpedo boat T6 was one of a dozen Type 35 torpedo boats built for the Kriegsmarine (German Navy) during the late 1930s. Completed in 1940, she initially escorted ships through the Skaggerak before she was assigned to escort minelayers as they laid their minefields in the North Sea and English Channel in July. T6 started laying her own minefields two months later and was flagship of the 2nd Torpedo Boat Flotilla when she struck a mine and sank when attempting to attack several convoys off the Scottish coast in November.

== Design and description ==
The Type 35 was an unsuccessful attempt by the Kriegsmarine to design a fast, ocean-going torpedo boat that did not exceed the 600-long-ton (610 t) displacement limit of the London Naval Treaty for ships that counted against the national tonnage limit. The boats had an overall length of 84.3 meters (276 ft 7 in) and were 82.2 meters (269 ft 8 in) long at the waterline. After the bow was rebuilt in 1941 to improve seaworthiness, the overall length increased to 87.1 meters (285 ft 9 in). The ships had a beam of 8.62 meters (28 ft 3 in), and a mean draft of 2.83 meters (9 ft 3 in) at deep load and displaced 859 metric tons (845 long tons) at standard load and 1,108 metric tons (1,091 long tons) at deep load. Their crew numbered 119 officers and sailors. Their pair of geared steam turbine sets, each driving one propeller, were designed to produce 31,000 shaft horsepower (23,000 kW) using steam from four high-pressure water-tube boilers which would propel the boats at 35 knots (65 km/h; 40 mph). They carried enough fuel oil to give them a range of 1,200 nautical miles (2,200 km; 1,400 mi) at 19 knots (35 km/h; 22 mph).

As built, the Type 35 class mounted a single 10.5 cm (4.1 in) SK C/32 gun on the stern. Anti-aircraft defense was provided by a single 3.7 cm (1.5 in) SK C/30 anti-aircraft gun superfiring over the 10.5 cm gun and a pair of 2 cm (0.8 in) C/30 guns on the bridge wings. They carried six above-water 533 mm (21 in) torpedo tubes in two triple mounts and could also carry 30 mines (or 60 if the weather was good). Many boats exchanged the 3.7 cm gun for another 2 cm gun, depth charges and minesweeping paravanes before completion. Late-war additions were limited to the installation of radar, radar detectors and additional AA guns, usually at the expense of the aft torpedo tube mount.

== Construction and career ==
T6 was ordered on 15 January 1936 from DeSchiMAG, laid down at their Bremen shipyard on 3 January 1937 as yard number 935, launched on 16 December 1937 and commissioned on 30 April 1940. The boat was working up until July when she was transferred to the Skaggerak for convoy escort duties. By 31 August T6 was assigned to the 2nd Torpedo Boat Flotilla with her sister ships T5, T7 and T8 as the flotilla escorted minelayers as they laid minefields in the southwestern part of the North Sea from 31 August to 2 September. The flotilla escorted a minelaying mission in the English Channel on 5–6 September and then laid minefields itself on 8–9 and 15–16 September in the Straits of Dover. By November the 1st and 2nd Torpedo Boat Flotillas had transferred to Stavanger, Norway. German aerial reconnaissance had located two coastal convoys in early November that the Kriegsmarine estimated would pass Kinnaird Head, Scotland, during the early morning of 7 November. Both flotillas with T6, T7, T8 and their sisters, T1, T4, T9 and T10 sailed on 6 November in an attempt to pass through a gap in the British minefields and intercept the convoys around 02:00 the following morning. The British had extended their minefields further north unbeknownst to the Germans and T6, flagship of the 2nd Torpedo Boat Flotilla, struck a mine shortly after midnight. The explosion knocked out both turbines, started a fire aft and gave the ship a 10 degree list. When the forward turbine room started to flood and the list increased, the captain gave the order to abandon ship. T7 and T8 rescued the survivors, but 48 men were lost and the operation was abandoned.
