= German torpedo boat T2 =

German torpedo boat of the Type 35 class (1935–1946)

- Right elevation and plan of the Type 1935

History

Nazi Germany
- Name: T2
- Ordered: 16 November 1935
- Builder: Schichau, Elbing, East Prussia
- Yard number: 1381
- Laid down: 14 November 1936
- Launched: 7 April 1938
- Completed: 2 December 1939
- Fate: Scrapped, 1946

General characteristics (as built)
- Class & type: Type 35 torpedo boat
- Displacement: 859 long tons (873 t) (standard); 1,108 long tons (1,126 t) (deep load)
- Length: 84.3 m (276 ft 7 in) o/a
- Beam: 8.62 m (28 ft 3 in)
- Draft: 2.83 m (9 ft 3 in)
- Installed power: 4 × water-tube boilers; 31,000 shp (23,000 kW)
- Propulsion: 2 × shafts; 2 × geared steam turbines
- Speed: 35 knots (65 km/h; 40 mph)
- Range: 1,200 nmi (2,200 km; 1,400 mi) at 19 knots (35 km/h; 22 mph)
- Complement: 119
- Armament: 1 × single 10.5 cm (4.1 in) gun; 1 × single 3.7 cm (1.5 in) AA guns; 2 × single 2 cm (0.8 in) AA guns; 2 × triple 533 mm (21 in) torpedo tubes; 30–60 mines

The German torpedo boat T2 was one of a dozen Type 35 torpedo boats built for the Kriegsmarine (German Navy) during the late 1930s. Completed in 1939, she was not combat ready until mid-1940, when she spent several months escorting minelayers as they laid minefields. The boat returned to Germany after being damaged and supported operations in the Baltic Sea after the start of Operation Barbarossa in June 1941. T2 returned to France at the end of the year, escorting a commerce raider through the English Channel. She then escorted a pair of battleships and a heavy cruiser through the Channel back to Germany in early 1942 in the Channel Dash. The boat was placed in reserve upon her return and was transferred back to France in 1943, where she helped to escort blockade runners through the Bay of Biscay. In mid-1943, she returned to the Baltic and briefly served as flagship of a submarine flotilla before being assigned to the Torpedo School. T2 was sunk in an air raid in July 1944, but was refloated several months later. She was never repaired and eventually scrapped in 1946.

== Design and description ==
The Type 35 was an unsuccessful attempt by the Kriegsmarine to design a fast, ocean-going torpedo boat that did not exceed the 600-long-ton (610 t) displacement limit of the London Naval Treaty for ships that counted against the national tonnage limit. The boats had an overall length of 84.3 meters (276 ft 7 in) and were 82.2 meters (269 ft 8 in) long at the waterline. After the bow was rebuilt in 1941 to improve seaworthiness, the overall length increased to 87.1 meters (285 ft 9 in). The ships had a beam of 8.62 meters (28 ft 3 in) and a mean draft of 2.83 meters (9 ft 3 in) at deep load. They displaced 859 metric tons (845 long tons) at standard load and 1,108 metric tons (1,091 long tons) at deep load, exceeding the planned limit. Their crew numbered 119 officers and sailors. Their pair of geared steam turbine sets, each driving one propeller, were designed to produce 31,000 shaft horsepower (23,000 kW), using steam from four high-pressure water-tube boilers which would propel the boats at 35 knots (65 km/h; 40 mph). They carried enough fuel oil to give them a range of 1,200 nautical miles (2,200 km; 1,400 mi) at 19 knots (35 km/h; 22 mph).

As built, the Type 35 class mounted a single 10.5 cm (4.1 in) SK C/32 gun on the stern. Anti-aircraft defense was provided by a single 3.7 cm (1.5 in) SK C/30 anti-aircraft gun superfiring over the 10.5 cm gun and a pair of 2 cm (0.8 in) C/30 guns on the bridge wings. They carried six above-water 533 mm (21 in) torpedo tubes in two triple mounts and could also carry 30 mines (or 60 if the weather was good). Many boats exchanged the 3.7 cm gun for another 2 cm gun, depth charges and minesweeping paravanes before completion. While the full extent of any modifications to T2 are unknown, photographic evidence shows the ship was fitted with a quadruple mount for 2 cm guns in lieu of the single 3.7 cm gun and an additional 2 cm weapon positioned on the bow before her loss in mid-1944. She is not known have been fitted with radar.

== Construction and career ==
T2 was ordered on 16 November 1935 from Schichau, laid down at their Elbing, East Prussia, shipyard on 14 November 1936 as yard number 1381, launched on 7 April 1938, and commissioned on 2 December 1939. The boat was working up until June 1940, when she began convoy escort duties in German waters. Now assigned to the 5th Torpedo Boat Flotilla, T2, her sister ships T7 and T8, and the torpedo boats Kondor, Falke, and Jaguar escorted minelayers as they laid a minefield in the southwestern North Sea on 7–8 August and again on 14–15 August. Newly assigned to the 1st Torpedo Boat Flotilla with Kondor and her sisters T1 and T3, T2 escorted a minelaying mission in the English Channel on 6–7 September. Five days later, T2, the torpedo boat Seeadler, T1, and T3 were ordered to proceed to France. They were attacked enroute by a Bristol Blenheim light bomber that dropped a bomb 10 meters (33 ft) to one side of T2. Splinters from the bomb badly damaged the torpedo boat and wounded six men. She stopped in Vlissingen, Netherlands, for emergency repairs and then sailed to Wilhelmshaven, where she arrived on 25 September.

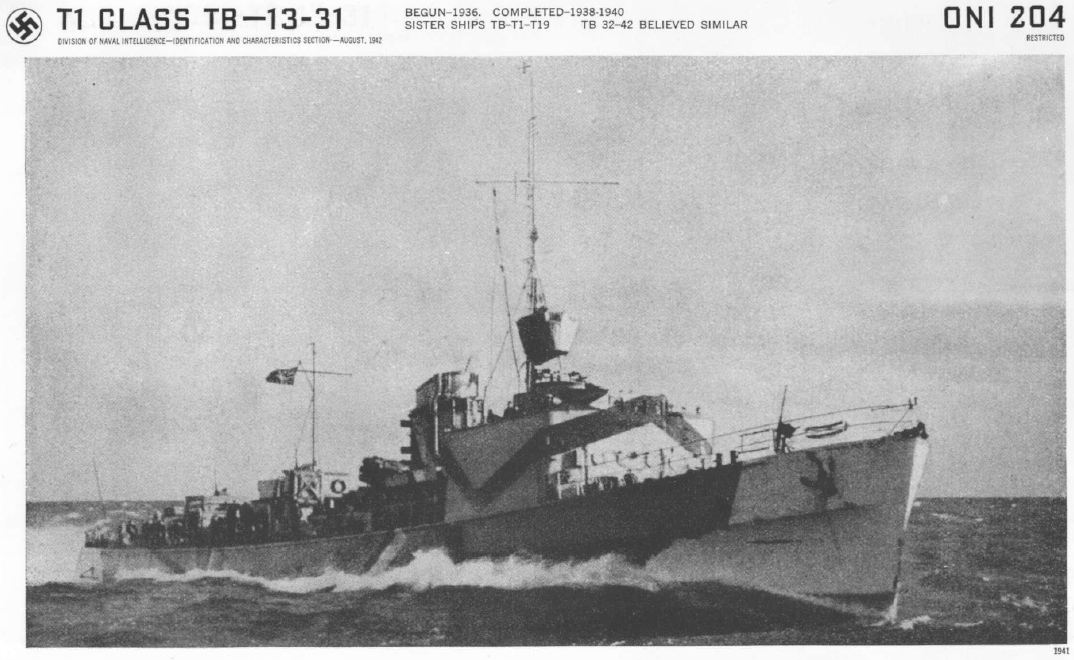
Photo of sister ship T1 from the US Office of Naval Intelligence 1942 Ship Recognition Manual

Permanent repairs at Schichau's shipyard in Elbing lasted until May 1941, and T2 was working up until July, when she began escorting convoys in the Skaggerak. Together with her sisters T5, T8, and T11, the boat supported Operation Beowulf in mid-September. T2, T5, T7, T8, and T11 were among the escorts for the Baltic Fleet, a temporary formation built around the battleship Tirpitz, as it sortied into the Sea of Åland on 23–29 September to forestall any attempt by the Soviet Red Banner Baltic Fleet to breakout from the Gulf of Finland. Afterwards, T2 became part of a decoy force used to distract the defenders. The ship was briefly refitted in November. On 2 December, T2 and her sister T12 rendezvoused with the commerce raider Thor in the Schillig Roads; they were joined by T4, T7, and the torpedo boat T14 the following day, and then began to escort Thor through the Channel. Delayed by heavy fog, the ships did not reach Brest, France, until the 15th, while Thor continued onwards into the Atlantic.

On the morning of 12 February 1942, the 2nd and 3rd Torpedo Boat Flotillas (with T2, T4, T5, T11, T12 and T13, T15, T16, and T17 respectively) rendezvoused with the battleships Gneisenau and Scharnhorst and the heavy cruiser Prinz Eugen to escort them through the Channel to Germany in the Channel Dash. T2's gunners claimed to have shot down one British aircraft during the operation. Upon her arrival in Germany, T2 was reduced to reserve until she was ordered to France in March 1943. Although escorted by T2, T5, Kondor, and the torpedo boats T22 and T23, the Italian blockade runner Himalaya failed in her attempt to break through the Bay of Biscay when she was spotted by British aircraft and forced to return by heavy aerial attacks on 9–11 April. On 5–8 May, the 2nd Torpedo Boat Flotilla with T2, T5, and the torpedo boats T18 and T22 laid three minefields in the Channel. T2 transferred to the Baltic and served as flagship of the 25th U-boat Flotilla from 10 July to September. The next month, she was assigned to the Torpedo School. In April 1944, the four oldest of the sisters, including T2, were assigned to a training unit as they lacked radar and a reinforced anti-aircraft armament. This arrangement did not last long as the German situation in the east deteriorated and they began convoy escort duties throughout the Baltic a few months later. On 29 July 1944, the boat was sunk by American bombers attacking Bremen. T2 was refloated on 4 September and was towed to Swinemünde on 9 December and then to Elbing for repairs on 31 January 1945. Advancing Soviet forces forced her to be towed back west, unrepaired, the following month. The hulk was reported at Brunsbüttel in May and was broken up at Cuxhaven in 1946.
