= Type 35 torpedo boat =

Nazi German naval ship class

- Right elevation and plan of the Type 1935

Class overview
- Builders: Deschimag at AG Weser Shipyard; Schichau-Werke
- Operators: Kriegsmarine; Soviet Navy
- Preceded by: Type 24 torpedo boat
- Succeeded by: Type 37 torpedo boat
- Built: 1938–1940
- In commission: 1939–1957
- Completed: 12
- Lost: 8
- Scrapped: 4

General characteristics (as built)
- Type: Torpedo boat
- Displacement: 859 long tons (873 t) (standard); 1,108 long tons (1,126 t) (deep load)
- Length: 84.3 m (276 ft 7 in) o/a
- Beam: 8.62 m (28 ft 3 in)
- Draft: 2.83 m (9 ft 3 in)
- Installed power: 4 × water-tube boilers; 31,000 shp (23,000 kW)
- Propulsion: 2 × shafts; 2 × geared steam turbines
- Speed: 35 knots (65 km/h; 40 mph)
- Range: 1,200 nmi (2,200 km; 1,400 mi) at 19 knots (35 km/h; 22 mph)
- Complement: 119
- Armament: 1 × single 10.5 cm (4.1 in) gun; 1 × single 3.7 cm (1.5 in) AA gun; 2 × single 2 cm (0.8 in) AA guns; 2 × triple 533 mm (21 in) torpedo tubes; 30–60 mines

The Type 35 torpedo boat was a class of a dozen torpedo boats built for Nazi Germany's Kriegsmarine in the late 1930s. Although the first boats were completed a few months after the start of World War II in September 1939, none of them were able to participate in the Norwegian Campaign of April–June 1940. They began escorting convoys and covering minelaying operations in the North Sea and English Channel in July. Most of the boats were transferred to Norway in November where they made an unsuccessful attempt to attack shipping along the Scottish coast that saw one boat sunk.

They were all refitted in early 1941 and nearly half the class was deployed afterwards in the Baltic Sea where they supported German operations after Operation Barbarossa began in June. Four of the boats were placed in reserve at one point or another in 1941 and again in 1942, because of manpower shortages. Four others returned to France where they helped to escort a pair of commerce raiders passing through the Channel in late 1941 and were part of the escort for a pair of battleships and a heavy cruiser through the Channel back to Germany in the Channel Dash in early 1942. Two boats were the first to be assigned to the Torpedo School in mid-year and they were followed by all the others over the rest of the year and 1943. A pair of boats were sent to France in mid-1942 and were part of the escort during an unsuccessful attempt to pass one of the earlier commerce raiders back through the Channel in October.

In early 1943 three boats returned to France where they were twice unsuccessful in escorting an Italian blockade runner through the Bay of Biscay into the Atlantic. By the end of the year, all of the Type 35s were either in reserve, under repair or assigned to the Torpedo School. Advancing Soviet forces caused them to be recalled to active duty during 1944 to support German forces operating in the Baltic. Three boats were lost that year to Allied bombs. The following year three more were sunk by British aircraft and two lost to Soviet mines. Three survived the war and were seized by the Allies as war reparations. Only the Soviet Union actually made use of its vessel and it was eventually used as a test ship before being scuttled during the 1950s.

== Design and description ==
The 1930 London Naval Treaty had a clause that ships below 600 long tons (610 t) standard displacement did not count against the national tonnage limits, so the Kriegsmarine attempted to design a high-speed, ocean-going torpedo boat with a maximum displacement of 600 long tons. This proved to be impossible as the over-ambitious high-speed requirement demanded use of the same troublesome high-pressure boilers that were being installed in the Type 1934 destroyers. The maintenance problems with the boilers were exacerbated by the lack of access to the machinery allowed by the restricted spaces of the lightly-built and narrow hull. The naval historian M. J. Whitley deemed "the whole concept, with the benefit of hindsight, must be considered a gross waste of men and materials, for these torpedo boats were rarely employed in their designed role."

The boats had an overall length of 84.3 meters (276 ft 7 in) and were 82.2 meters (269 ft 8 in) long at the waterline. After the bow was rebuilt in 1941 to improve seaworthiness, the overall length increased to 87.1 meters (285 ft 9 in). They had a beam of 8.62 meters (28 ft 3 in), and a mean draft of 2.83 meters (9 ft 3 in) at deep load and displaced 859 long tons (873 t) at standard load and 1,108 long tons (1,126 t) at deep load. Their hull was divided into 12 watertight compartments and it was fitted with a double bottom that covered 75% of their length. The boats had a metacentric height of 0.74 meters (2.4 ft). They were considered excellent sea boats and were very maneuverable. They were, however, very wet forward in a head sea until the bow was rebuilt. The crew numbered 119 officers and sailors.

The Type 35s had two sets of Wagner geared steam turbines, each driving a single three-bladed 2.45–2.6-meter (8 ft 0 in – 8 ft 6 in) propeller, using steam provided by four Wagner water-tube boilers that operated at a pressure of 70 kg/cm^{2} (6,865 kPa; 996 psi) and a temperature of 460 °C (860 °F). The turbines were designed to produce 31,000 shaft horsepower (23,000 kW) for a speed of 35 knots (65 km/h; 40 mph). The boats carried a maximum of 191 metric tons (188 long tons) of fuel oil which gave a range of 1,200 nautical miles (2,200 km; 1,400 mi) at 19 knots (35 km/h; 22 mph).

=== Armament ===
As built, the Type 35 class mounted a single 42-caliber 10.5 cm (4.1 in) SK C/32 (Note: In Kriegsmarine gun nomenclature, SK stands for Schiffskanone (ship's gun), C/32 stands for Constructionjahr (construction year) 1932.) gun on the stern. Its mount had a range of elevation from -10° to +50° and the gun fired 15.1-kilogram (33 lb) projectiles at a muzzle velocity of 785 m/s (2,580 ft/s). It had a range of 15,175 meters (16,596 yd) at an elevation of +44.4°.

Anti-aircraft defense was provided by a single 80-caliber 3.7 cm (1.5 in) SK C/30 anti-aircraft (AA) gun superfiring over the 10.5 cm gun. The hand-operated mount had a maximum elevation of 80° which gave the gun a ceiling of less than 6,800 metres (22,300 ft); horizontal range was 8,500 metres (9,300 yd) at an elevation of 35.7°. The single-shot SK C/30 fired 0.748-kilogram (1.65 lb) projectiles at a muzzle velocity of 1,000 m/s (3,300 ft/s) at a rate of 30 rounds per minute. The boats were also fitted with a pair of 65-caliber 2 cm (0.8 in) C/30 AA guns on the bridge wings. The gun had an effective rate of fire of about 120 rounds per minute. Its 0.12-kilogram (0.26 lb) projectiles were fired at a muzzle velocity of 875 m/s (2,870 ft/s) which gave it a ceiling of 3,700 meters (12,100 ft) and a maximum horizontal range of 4,800 meters (5,200 yd). Each boat carried 2,000 rounds per gun.

The boats were also equipped with six above-water 533 mm (21 in) torpedo tubes in two triple rotating mounts and could also carry 30 mines (or 60 if the weather was good). The boats used the G7a torpedo which had a 300-kilogram (660 lb) warhead and three speed/range settings: 14,000 meters (15,000 yd) at 30 knots (56 km/h; 35 mph); 8,000 meters (8,700 yd) at 40 knots (74 km/h; 46 mph) and 6,000 meters (6,600 yd) at 44 knots (81 km/h; 51 mph).

Many boats exchanged the 3.7 cm gun for another 2 cm gun, depth charges and minesweeping paravanes before completion. Late-war additions were limited to the installation of radar, radar detectors and additional AA guns. As late as April 1944, T1, T2, T3, and T4 lacked radar and had not had their anti-aircraft suite significantly augmented.

== Ships ==
Construction data
Ship	Builder	Laid down	Launched	Commissioned	Fate
T1	Schichau, Elbing	14 November 1936	17 February 1938	1 December 1939	Sunk by aircraft, 10 April 1945
T2	Schichau, Elbing	14 November 1936	7 April 1938	2 December 1939	Sunk by aircraft, 29 July 1944
T3	Schichau, Elbing	14 November 1936	23 June 1938	3 February 1940	Sunk by aircraft, 19 September 1940, but raised and repaired. Sunk by mines, 14 March 1945
T4	Schichau, Elbing	29 December 1936	15 September 1938	27 May 1940	Transferred to US, 1945, then Denmark, 1948; scrapped, 1951
T5	Deschimag, Bremen	30 December 1936	22 November 1937	23 January 1940	Sunk by mines, 14 March 1945
T6	Deschimag, Bremen	3 January 1937	16 December 1937	30 April 1940	Sunk by mines, 7 November 1940
T7	Deschimag, Bremen	20 August 1937	18 June 1938	20 December 1939	Sunk by aircraft, 29 July 1944
T8	Deschimag, Bremen	28 August 1937	10 August 1938	8 October 1939	Sunk by aircraft, 3 May 1945
T9	Schichau	24 November 1936	3 November 1938	4 July 1940	Sunk by aircraft, 3 May 1945
T10	Schichau	24 November 1936	19 January 1939	5 August 1940	Sunk by aircraft, 19 December 1944
T11	Deschimag	1 July 1938	1 March 1939	24 May 1940	Transferred to UK, 1946, then France; scrapped, 1951
T12	Deschimag	20 August 1938	12 April 1939	3 July 1940	Transferred to USSR, 1946; converted into a test ship and scuttled, 1959

== Service ==
Although the first few boats were completed at the end of 1939, maintenance problems with the boilers and modifications to the bridge and the normal issues associated with working up boats of a new class, kept them in German waters until mid-1940. Assigned to the 5th Torpedo Boat Flotilla, T2, T7 and T8 began escorting minelayers as they laid a minefield in the North Sea in August. By the end of the month, T1, T2 and T3 were assigned to the 1st Torpedo Boat Flotilla while T5, T6, T7 and T8 were assigned to the 2nd Torpedo Boat Flotilla. Both flotillas continued to escort minelayers in the North Sea and the English Channel and the Straits of Dover. T12 was transferred to Norway for convoy escort duties in September. T2 was damaged by British bombers on 9 September and returned to Germany for repairs. T3 was sunk by British bombers nine days later, although she was refloated in 1941 and towed back to Germany. By November the 1st and 2nd Torpedo Boat Flotillas with T1, T4, T6, T7, T8, T9 and T10 between them had transferred to Stavanger, Norway. On 6 November they departed in an attempt to attack two coastal convoys that had been spotted off the Scottish coast, but they ran into a British minefield that sank T6 and they returned to port after recovering the survivors. T11 remained in France until December when she began a lengthy refit in Germany. All of her sisters began their own refits between January and March 1941.

After completing their refits, T2, T5, T8 and T11 supported German forces invading the Estonian islands (Operation Beowulf) in mid-September and then, reinforced by T7, they escorted the battleship Tirpitz, as it sortied into the Sea of Åland on 23–29 September to forestall any attempt by the Soviet Red Banner Baltic Fleet to breakout from the Gulf of Finland. T1, T8, T9 and T10 were reduced to reserve at some point during the year to alleviate manpower shortages. In November, T4, T7 and T12 successfully escorted the commerce raider Komet through the Channel and into the Atlantic despite an attack by British motor torpedo boats (MTBs). The following month T2, T4, T7, T12 and the torpedo boat T14 successfully did the same for the commerce raider Thor although the British failed to react.

On the morning of 12 February 1942, the 2nd Torpedo Boat Flotilla (with T2, T4, T5, T11 and T12) rendezvoused with the battleships Gneisenau and Scharnhorst and the heavy cruiser Prinz Eugen to help escort them through the Channel to Germany in the Channel Dash. After their arrival, T4, T5, T11 and T12 were transferred to Norway for escort duties and were joined by T7 in April while T2 was reduced to reserve, followed by T11. T1 and T8 were reactivated and assigned to the Torpedo School as training ships in mid-1942. T4 returned to France in June, followed shortly afterwards by T10, and were assigned to 3rd Torpedo Boat Flotilla. The flotilla made an unsuccessful attempt to escort Komet through the Channel in October. They were intercepted by a British force of five escort destroyers and eight MTBs that sank the raider and severely damaged T10 which subsequently returned home and was paid off into reserve. T7 was briefly put in reserve in October before being assigned to the Torpedo School in January 1943.

T4 and T10 returned to Germany in January and then joined T1, T7, T8 and T11 in the Torpedo School. T2 was activated and joined T9 and T12 in France in March 1943 while T5 arrived there that same month. T2, T9 and T12, all assigned to the 2nd Torpedo Boat Flotilla, were some of the escorts in late March for the Italian blockade runner, Himalaya, in her attempt to breakout through the Bay of Biscay, but the Italian ship turned back when she was spotted by a British reconnaissance aircraft. Another attempt was made several weeks later, but failed when she was spotted by British aircraft and forced to return by heavy aerial attacks. T9 and T12 sailed to Germany in May for a refit and were then assigned to the Torpedo School while T2 was transferred to the Baltic in July and was assigned to the Torpedo School in October together with T5. T3 completed her repairs in December and was then assigned to the Torpedo School.

Beginning in March 1944, the boats began to return to active duty with the 2nd Torpedo Boat Flotilla escorting ships in the Baltic and supporting Axis forces against advancing Soviet troops. T8 and T10, together with the torpedo boat T30, and Finnish forces participated in a failed attempt to recapture the island of Narvi on 27/28 June. The three torpedo boats damaged a Soviet patrol boat off Narva, Estonia, on 16 July. On 29 July, T2 and T7 were sunk by American bombers attacking Bremen. Both ships were refloated, but neither was repaired. On the night of 23/24 November, the flotilla, which included T3, T5, T9 and T12, screened the heavy cruiser Admiral Scheer as she shelled Soviet positions during the evacuation of Sworbe, on the Estonian island of Ösel. T10 was damaged during a Soviet air raid on Libau, Latvia, on 15 December. She sailed to Gotenhafen for repairs and was in a floating drydock when the British bombed the port on 18 December. The drydock was badly damaged and several bombs landed between the drydock's walls and T10's hull, blowing large holes in the latter and she sank the following day.

T1 and T12 were among the escorts for Prinz Eugen as she supported a German counterattack against advancing Soviet forces near Cranz, East Prussia, on 29–30 January 1945. T8 screened the heavy cruiser Lützow as she bombarded Soviet positions near Frauenburg on 8 February. While escorting a convoy on 14 March, T3 and T5 struck mines laid by a Soviet submarine and sank. T1 sank after being hit by British bombs in Kiel on the night of 9 April and T8 and T9 were sunk by British aircraft on 3 May. T4, T11 and T12 were the only Type 35s to survive the war. The first two were allocated to the United States and Great Britain when the Allies divided the surviving ships of the Kriegsmarine amongst themselves in late 1945, but their navies had no interest in them. T4 was sold to Denmark on in 1948 for use as a MTB leader, but was never commissioned and the boat was demolished in 1950–1951. The British transferred T11 to France in 1946 which renamed her Bir Hacheim. The boat was immediately placed in reserve until she was stricken on 8 October 1951 and subsequently scrapped. T12 was allocated to the Soviet Union and renamed Podvizhny in 1946. She served with the Baltic Fleet until 1949, when she seriously damaged by a boiler explosion. The boat was withdrawn from service on in 1953 and renamed Kit in 1954 for use as a vessel in simulated nuclear testing on Lake Ladoga, the boat was scuttled in shallow water in 1959. In mid-1991, the radioactively contaminated wreck was raised and towed to a different location, where it was scuttled in deeper water.
