= German torpedo boat Kondor =

Kondor
- Right elevation and plan of the Type 23

History

Germany
- Name: Kondor
- Namesake: Condor
- Builder: Reichsmarinewerft Wilhelmshaven
- Yard number: 106
- Laid down: 17 November 1925
- Launched: 22 September 1926
- Commissioned: 15 July 1928
- Decommissioned: 28 June 1944
- Fate: Constructive total loss, 31 July or 2 August 1944

General characteristics (as built)
- Class & type: Type 23 torpedo boat
- Displacement: 923 long tons (938 t) (standard); 1,290 long tons (1,310 t) (deep load)
- Length: 87.7 m (287 ft 9 in) (o/a)
- Beam: 8.25 m (27 ft 1 in)
- Draft: 3.65 m (12 ft)
- Installed power: 3 × water-tube boilers; 23,000 shp (17,000 kW)
- Propulsion: 2 × shafts; 2 × geared steam turbine sets
- Speed: 32–34 knots (59–63 km/h; 37–39 mph)
- Range: 1,800 nmi (3,300 km; 2,100 mi) at 17 knots (31 km/h; 20 mph)
- Complement: 120
- Armament: 3 × single 10.5 cm (4.1 in) guns; 2 × triple 500 mm (19.7 in) torpedo tubes; 30 mines

Kondor was the fifth of six Type 23 torpedo boats built for the German Navy (initially called the Reichsmarine and then renamed as the Kriegsmarine in 1935). The boat made multiple non-intervention patrols during the Spanish Civil War in the late 1930s. During World War II, she played a minor role in the attack on Oslo, the capital of Norway, during the Norwegian Campaign of 1940. Kondor spent the next several months escorting minelayers as they laid minefields and damaged heavy ships back to Germany before she was transferred to France around September. She started laying minefields herself that month and continued to do so for the rest of the war. The boat returned to France in 1942 and helped to escort blockade runners, commerce raiders and submarines through the English Channel and the Bay of Biscay. Damaged by a mine shortly before the Allied Invasion of Normandy in June 1944, Kondor was under repair on the day of the landings. Recognizing that she could not be repaired quickly, the boat was decommissioned later that month and was then further damaged by British bombers so that she was declared a constructive total loss.

== Design and armament ==
Derived from the World War I-era large torpedo boat SMS H145, (Note: "SMS" stands for "Seiner Majestät Schiff" (German: His Majesty's Ship).) the Type 23 torpedo boat was slightly larger, but had a similar armament and speed. The Type 23 had an overall length of 87.7 meters (287 ft 9 in) and was 85.7 meters (281 ft 2 in) long at the waterline. The ships had a beam of 8.25 meters (27 ft 1 in), and a mean draft of 3.65 meters (12 ft). They displaced 923 long tons (938 t) at standard load and 1,290 long tons (1,310 t) at deep load. Kondor was fitted with a pair of Schichau geared steam turbine sets, each driving one propeller, that were designed to produce 23,000 shaft horsepower (17,000 kW) using steam from three water-tube boilers which would propel the ship at 33 knots (61 km/h; 38 mph). The torpedo boats carried enough fuel oil to give them an intended range of 3,600 nautical miles (6,700 km; 4,100 mi) at 17 knots (31 km/h; 20 mph), but it proved to be only 1,800 nmi (3,300 km; 2,100 mi) at that speed in service. Their crew consisted of 4 officers and 116 sailors.

As built, the Type 23s mounted three 10.5 cm (4.1 in) SK L/45 (Note: In Imperial German Navy gun nomenclature, "SK" (Schnelladekanone) denotes that the gun is quick firing, while the L/45 denotes the length of the gun. In this case, the L/45 gun is 45 caliber, meaning that the gun is 45 times as long as it is in diameter.) guns, one forward and two aft of the superstructure; the aft superfiring gun was on an open mount while the others were protected by gun shields. They carried six above-water 50 cm (19.6 in) torpedo tubes in two triple mounts and could also carry up to 30 mines. After 1931, the torpedo tubes were replaced by 533-millimeter (21.0 in) tubes and a pair of 2-centimeter (0.8 in) C/30 (Note: In Kriegsmarine gun nomenclature, SK stands for Schiffskanone (ship's gun), C/30 stands for Constructionjahr (construction year) 1930.) anti-aircraft guns were added. During the war a quadruple 2 cm mount was added just forward of No. 2 gun, three 2 cm guns were positioned around the aft funnel and another pair were mounted on the bridge wings, all in single mounts. Around 1944 a FuMB 4 Sumatra radar detector was installed as was radar.

== Construction and career ==
Named after the Condor, the boat was laid down at the Reichsmarinewerft Wilhelmshaven (Navy Yard) on 17 November 1925 as yard number 106, launched on 22 September 1926 and commissioned on 15 July 1928. The boat was initially assigned to the 4th Torpedo Boat Half Flotilla. By the end of 1936 Kondor was assigned to the 4th Torpedo Boat Flotilla and the boat made several deployments to Spain during the Spanish Civil War.

=== Second World War ===
Map of operations in the Oslofjord on the night of 8/9 April, showing how far the Germans had progressed at various times as well as their movements

Now assigned to the 5th Torpedo Boat Flotilla, Kondor supported the North Sea mining operations that began on 3 September 1939. During the Norwegian Campaign, the boat was assigned to Group 5 under Konteradmiral Oskar Kummetz on the heavy cruiser Blücher, tasked to capture Oslo. Kondor transported about 100 men of the invasion force and was one of the cruiser's escorts through the Baltic and Kattegat. At 02:30 the small motor minesweepers R17 and R21 and Kondor were detached to occupy the naval base at Karljohansvern, in the town of Horten. Her sister ship, Albatros, had become separated from the main body while crippling the Norwegian patrol boat HNoMS Pol III earlier that night and followed Kondor's group to Horten.

The German force tasked to occupy Karljohansvern was scheduled to do so at dawn on 9 April, but Kondor's captain, Kapitänleutnant (Lieutenant) Hans Wilck, commander of the force, decided to assault the harbor directly since the Norwegians had already been alerted. About 140 soldiers were transferred to R17 and R21 and the former ship was in the lead as they steamed through the harbor entrance at 04:35 at high speed, slowly followed by Albatros, while Kondor was transferring her embarked troops to another ship. The minelayer HNoMS Olav Tryggvason engaged R17 ten minutes later and set her on fire, but not before she unloaded her troops. The minelayer was only able to get a few shots off at R21 before she steamed behind an island in the harbor. About this time, Albatros was approaching the harbor mouth and exchanged fire with Olav Tryggvason without effect. The torpedo boat, with only a single gun able to bear on the minelayer, withdrew behind one of the outer islands and started blindly bombarding the harbor. Albatros withdrew not long after she was hit by a shell around 06:30 and the German troops that had made it ashore bluffed the Norwegians into surrendering at 07:35, but not before Wilck had reloaded his troops and sailed to regain radio communication with the German cruisers to support the attack.

Later that morning, Kondor and Albatros were ordered to land their troops at Son and then Kondor and several minesweepers were able to pass through the Drøbak Sound after the Norwegian coastal defenses had sunk Blücher while passing through the Sound further up the Oslofjord, and search for Blücher's survivors. During the search, she damaged a propeller on Blücher's wreckage. Later that day, Kondor supported German forces as they occupied Drøbak. The following morning, Albatros and Kondor were engaged by coastal batteries on the island of Bolærne and forced to turn away. After the coast-defense guns broke down, Kondor's crew occupied the island. After the heavy cruiser Lützow had been crippled by a British submarine off the Danish coast on 11 April, Kondor and her sister Möwe, among other ships, arrived later that morning to render assistance.

Escorted by two destroyers, Kondor, Möwe, and the torpedo boat Wolf, minelayers laid a minefield in the Skaggerak on 29–30 April. En route, the torpedo boat Leopard was sunk when she was accidentally rammed by the minelayer Preussen. From 20–23 June, Kondor was one of the escorts for the badly damaged battleship Scharnhorst from Norway to Kiel, Germany. The following month, she helped to escort Scharnhorst's sister, Gneisenau from Trondheim, Norway, to Kiel from 25–28 July. Now assigned to the 5th Torpedo Boat Flotilla, Kondor, her sister Falke, and the torpedo boats Jaguar, T2, T7 and T8 escorted minelayers as they laid a minefield in the southwestern North Sea on 7/8 August. The flotilla escorted another minelaying mission in the same area on 14–15 August. The following month, Kondor was transferred to the 1st Torpedo Boat Flotilla, with T1, T2, and T3. On 6–7 September they escorted a minelaying mission in the English Channel. Rejoining the 5th Flotilla before the end of the month, Kondor and her sisters, Falke, Greif, and Seeadler laid a minefield in the English Channel on 30 September – 1 October. Reinforced by Wolf and Jaguar, the flotilla made an unsuccessful sortie off the Isle of Wight on 8–9 October. They made a second, more successful, sortie on 11–12 October, sinking two Free French submarine chasers and two British trawlers. The 5th Flotilla was transferred to St. Nazaire later that month and its ships laid a minefield off Dover on 3–4 December.

Kondor was refitted in Rotterdam, Netherlands, from March to May 1941. She was transferred afterwards to the Skagerrak where she was on convoy escort duties. The boat was again refitted in Rotterdam from November to December.

==== 1941–1944 ====
The flotilla joined the escort force for Gneisenau, Scharnhorst and the heavy cruiser Prinz Eugen on 12 February 1942 off Cap Gris-Nez during the Channel Dash. From 12 March to 2 April, the flotilla escorted the commerce raider Michel through the English Channel despite heavy British attacks, damaging the British destroyers HMS Walpole and Fernie. The flotilla escorted the commerce raider Stier through the English Channel from 12 to 19 May. In heavy fighting on the 13th, British motor torpedo boats (MTBs) sank Seeadler and the torpedo boat Iltis while losing one of their own boats. Falke and Kondor and the torpedo boats T22 and T23 escorted the Italian blockade runner, SS Cortellazzo, from Bordeaux through the Bay of Biscay on 29–30 November. Another Italian blockade runner, Himalaya, escorted by Kondor and the torpedo boats T2, T5, T22, and T23, failed in her attempt to break through the Bay of Biscay when she was spotted by British aircraft and forced to return by heavy aerial attacks on 9–11 April. Kondor, Greif, Falke, Möwe and T22 laid two minefields in the English Channel on 4–6 June. Later that month the ships returned to the Bay of Biscay to help escort U-boats through the Bay and continued to do so into early August. Möwe and Kondor helped to lay two minefields in the English Channel on 3–5 September. Kondor, Greif and the torpedo boats T19, T26, and T27 followed this with another minefield in the English Channel on 29–30 September.

The 4th and 5th Torpedo Boat Flotillas, consisting Kondor, Greif, Möwe, and the torpedo boats Jaguar, T27, and T29 laid minefields of 180 mines, off Le Havre and Fécamp, France, on 21 and 22 March. On 17–19 April 1944, the 5th Torpedo Boat Flotilla, including Kondor, Greif and Möwe, sailed from Brest, France, to Cherbourg as distant cover for a convoy. A few days later, the flotilla laid a minefield on the night of 21/22 April. The following night the torpedo boats engaged British MTBs near Cape Barfleur and sank one of them. On the nights of 26/27 and 27/28 April, they laid 108 mines each night near Cherbourg. While trying to evade British aerial attacks on the latter night, Kondor struck a British mine, but was only lightly damaged. On 30 April and 1 May, the flotilla laid 260 mines in three minefields. Three weeks later, the flotilla was ordered to transfer from Cherbourg to Le Havre and departed on the night of 23/24 May. Kondor, Greif, Falke, Möwe and Jaguar were attacked by Allied aircraft early the next day and Greif was struck by two bombs that set her forward boiler room on fire and caused her to take on water forward. With both boiler rooms subsequently flooded, she was unmaneuverable and accidentally collided with Falke. The latter was only slightly damaged, but Greif's bow was badly bent, which caused problems for Möwe when she began to tow her sister. Around 06:00 Greif lost all power and sank a half hour later. At 07:43 Kondor struck a mine and had to be towed by Möwe for the remainder of the voyage. Kondor began a lengthy refit in Le Havre, but was cannibalized for spare parts after the Allies landed in Normandy on 6 June. The boat was decommissioned on 28 June and was then declared a total loss after being hit by bombs on 31 July or 2 August.

== Bibliography ==
- Campbell, John (1985). Naval Weapons of World War II. Annapolis, Maryland: Naval Institute Press. ISBN 978-0-87021-459-2.
- Friedman, Norman (2011). Naval Weapons of World War One: Guns, Torpedoes, Mines and ASW Weapons of All Nations; An Illustrated Directory. Barnsley, UK: Seaforth Publishing. ISBN 978-1-84832-100-7.
- Gröner, Erich (1990). German Warships 1815–1945. Vol. 1: Major Surface Warships. Annapolis, Maryland: Naval Institute Press. ISBN 0-87021-790-9.
- Haarr, Geirr H. (2009). The German Invasion of Norway, April 1940. Annapolis, Maryland: Naval Institute Press. ISBN 978-1-59114-310-9.
- Rohwer, Jürgen (2005). Chronology of the War at Sea 1939–1945: The Naval History of World War Two (Third Revised ed.). Annapolis, Maryland: Naval Institute Press. ISBN 1-59114-119-2.
- Sieche, Erwin (1980). "Germany". In Chesneau, Roger (ed.). Conway's All the World's Fighting Ships 1922–1946. London: Conway Maritime Press. ISBN 0-85177-146-7.
- Whitley, M. J. (2000). Destroyers of World War Two: An International Encyclopedia. London: Cassell & Co. ISBN 1-85409-521-8.
- Whitley, M. J. (1991). German Destroyers of World War Two. Annapolis, Maryland: Naval Institute Press. ISBN 1-55750-302-8.
