= German torpedo boat T30 =

German torpedo boat

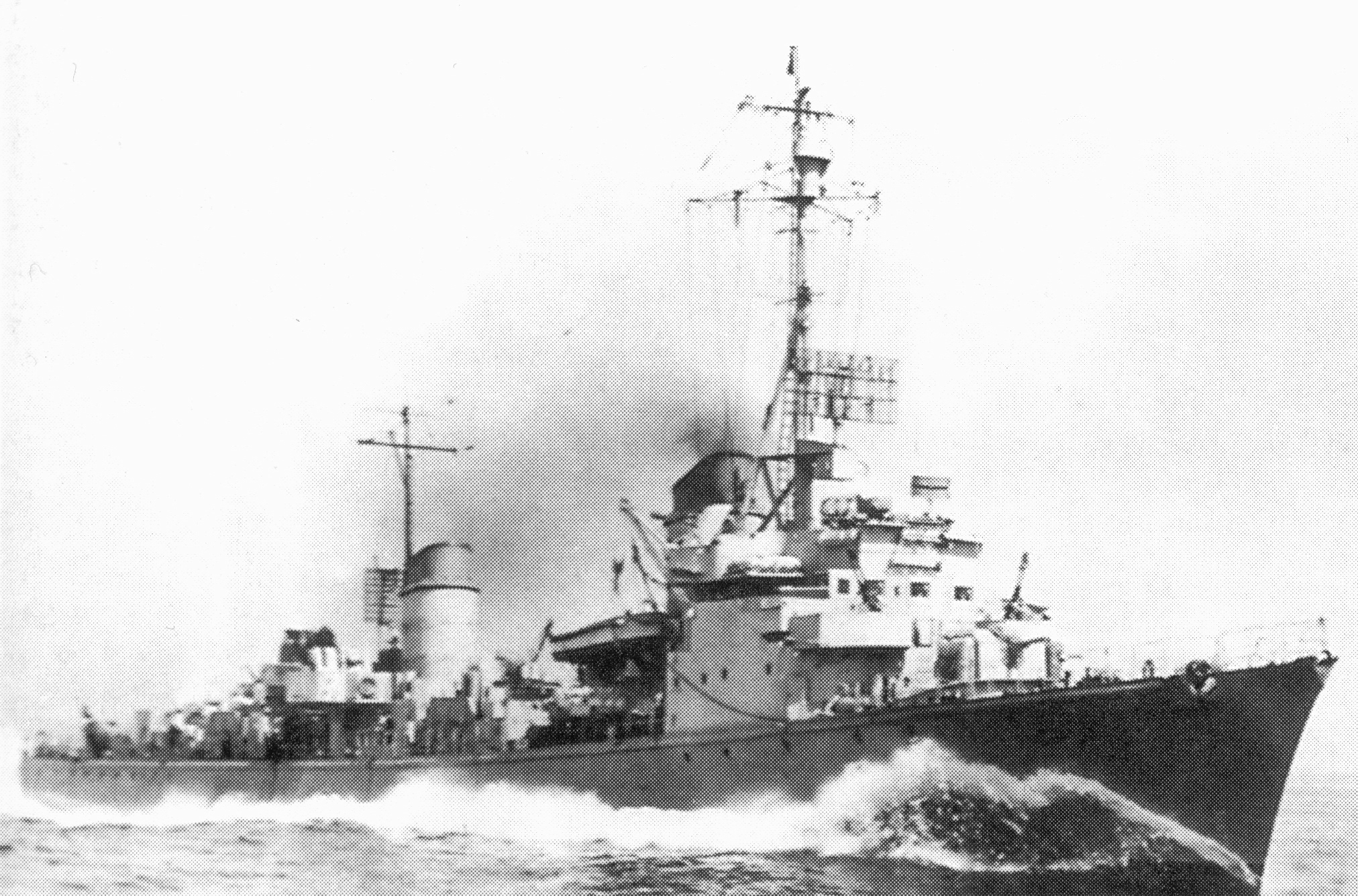
- Sister ship T35 in US service, August 1945

History

Nazi Germany
- Name: T30
- Ordered: 10 November 1939
- Builder: Schichau, Elbing, East Prussia
- Yard number: 1489
- Laid down: 10 April 1942
- Launched: 13 March 1943
- Completed: 24 October 1943
- Fate: Sunk by mine, 18 August 1944

General characteristics (as built)
- Class & type: Type 39 torpedo boat
- Displacement: 1,294 t (1,274 long tons) (standard); 1,754 t (1,726 long tons) (deep load)
- Length: 102.5 m (336 ft 3 in) o/a
- Beam: 10 m (32 ft 10 in)
- Draft: 3.22 m (10 ft 7 in)
- Installed power: 4 × water-tube boilers; 32,000 shp (24,000 kW)
- Propulsion: 2 × shafts; 2 × geared steam turbine sets
- Speed: 33.5 knots (62.0 km/h; 38.6 mph)
- Range: 2,400 nmi (4,400 km; 2,800 mi) at 19 knots (35 km/h; 22 mph)
- Complement: 206
- Sensors & processing systems: S-Gerät sonar; FuMO 21 radar
- Armament: 4 × single 10.5 cm (4.1 in) guns; 2 × twin 3.7 cm (1.5 in) AA guns; 1 × quadruple, 2 × single 2 cm (0.8 in) AA guns; 2 × triple 533 mm (21 in) torpedo tubes; 30–60 mines; 4 × depth charge launchers

The German torpedo boat T30 was one of fifteen Type 39 torpedo boats built for the Kriegsmarine (German Navy) during World War II. Completed in late 1943, the boat was assigned to support German operations in the Baltic Sea. She laid minefields in the Gulf of Finland, off the Estonian coast, in mid-April, before she was tasked to support Finnish forces in June. The following month, T30 helped to sink a Soviet patrol boat. After a navigational error caused her to enter a German minefield as she was preparing to lay one herself in August, the boat sank after striking several mines with the loss of 137 crewmen.

== Design and description ==
The Type 39 torpedo boat was conceived as a general-purpose design, much larger than preceding German torpedo boats. The boats had an overall length of 102.5 meters (336 ft 3 in) and were 97 meters (318 ft 3 in) long at the waterline. They had a beam of 10 meters (32 ft 10 in), a draft of 3.22 meters (10 ft 7 in) at deep load and displaced 1,294 metric tons (1,274 long tons) at standard load and 1,754 metric tons (1,726 long tons) at deep load. Their crew numbered 206 officers and sailors. The Type 39s were fitted with a pair of geared steam turbine sets, each driving one propeller, using steam from four high-pressure water-tube boilers. The turbines were designed to produce 32,000 shaft horsepower (24,000 kW) which was intended give the ships a maximum speed of 33.5 knots (62.0 km/h; 38.6 mph). They carried enough fuel oil to give them a range of 2,400 nautical miles (4,400 km; 2,800 mi) at 19 knots (35 km/h; 22 mph).

As built, the Type 39 ships mounted four 10.5 cm (4.1 in) SK C/32 guns in single mounts protected by gun shields; one forward of the superstructure, one between the funnels, and two aft, one superfiring over the other. Anti-aircraft defense was provided by four 3.7 cm (1.5 in) SK C/30 AA guns in two twin-gun mounts on platforms abaft the rear funnel, six 2 cm (0.8 in) C/38 guns in one quadruple mount on the aft superstructure and a pair of single mounts on the bridge wings. They carried six above-water 533 mm (21 in) torpedo tubes in two triple mounts amidships and could also carry 30 mines; the full complement of 60 mines made the ships top-heavy which could be dangerous in bad weather. For anti-submarine work the boats were fitted with a S-Gerät sonar and four depth charge launchers. The Type 39s were equipped with a FuMO 21 (Note: Funkmess-Ortung (Radio-direction finder, active ranging)) radar and various FumB (Note: Funkmess-Beobachtung (Passive radar detector).) radar detectors were installed late in the war.

== Construction and career ==
Originally ordered as a Type 37 torpedo boat on 30 March 1939, T30 was reordered on 10 November 1939 from Schichau, laid down on 10 April 1942 at their Elbing, East Prussia, shipyard as yard number 1489, launched on 13 March 1943 and commissioned on 24 October 1943. After working up, the boat was attached to the 6th Destroyer Flotilla and helped to lay minefields in Narva Bay in mid-April 1944. T30 and her sister T31 were tasked to support Finnish forces in Vyborg Bay and Koivisto Sound during the Vyborg–Petrozavodsk Offensive. On 20 June they engaged Soviet motor torpedo boats and claimed 3–5 boats sunk, but T31 was sunk by a torpedo. Afterwards, she was assigned to the 2nd Torpedo Boat Flotilla and participated in a failed attempt to recapture the island of Narvi on 27/28 June together with the torpedo boats T8, T10 and Finnish forces. The three torpedo boats damaged a Soviet patrol boat off Narva, Estonia, on 16 July. By August T30 had been transferred to the 6th Torpedo Boat Flotilla. The flotilla, consisting of T30 and her sisters T32 and T22, was tasked to lay a minefield in Narva Bay on the night of 17/18 August. Reinforced by their sister T23 from the 5th Torpedo Boat Flotilla, the boats each loaded 54 mines in Helsinki, Finland, and departed on the evening of the 17th. Shortly after midnight, they started to lay their mines, but had only just begun when T30 struck a pair of mines about 00:25 which knocked out her power and gave her a list to port. About a minute after that T32 also struck a pair of mines that blew her bow off and disabled her engines. At 00:30 T30 exploded and broke in half, probably after hitting another mine. She sank at 59°43′N 27°17′E with the loss of 137 crewmen.
