= Schillig =

Village in Lower Saxony, Germany

Coordinates: 53°42′06″N 8°01′24″E

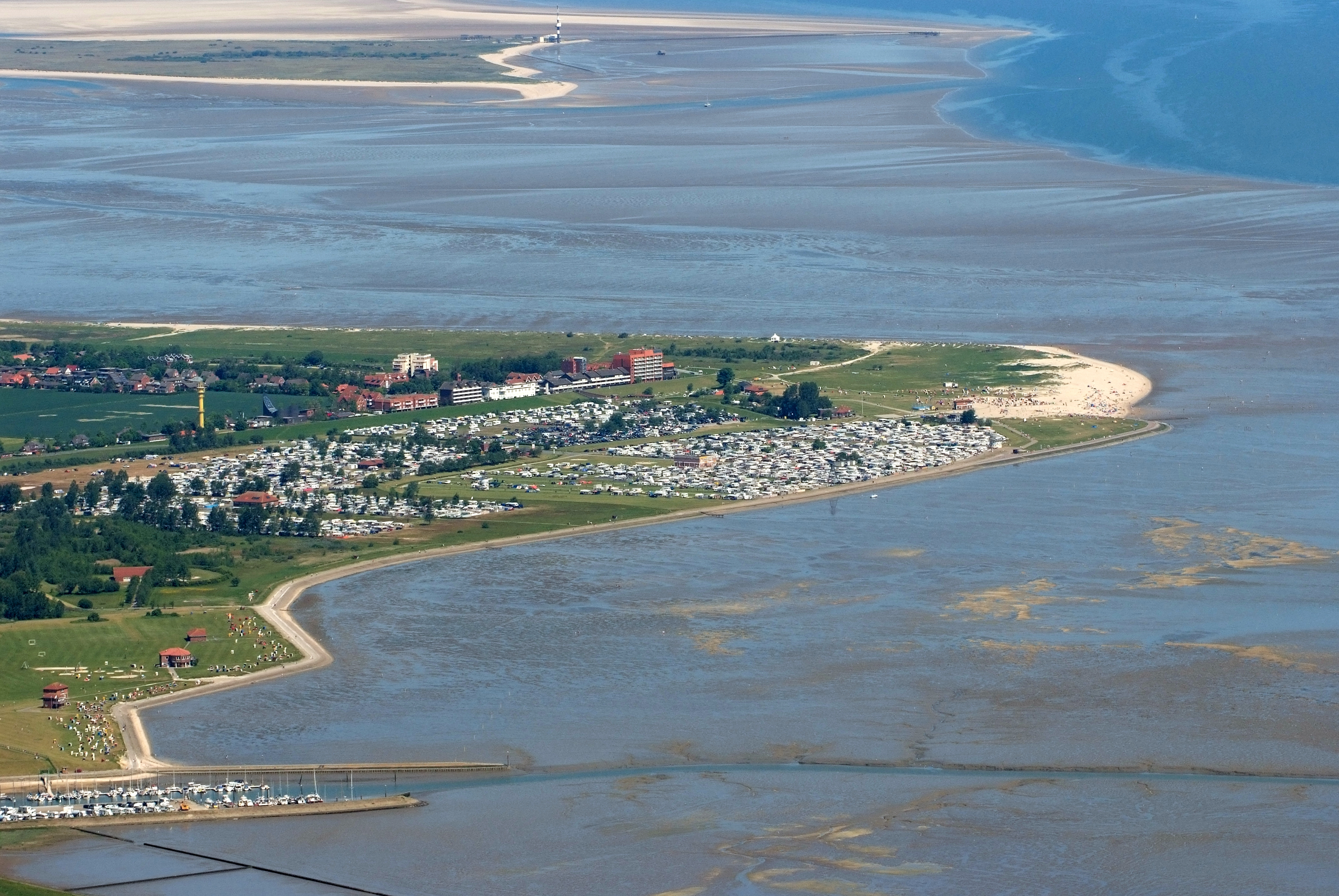
2012-05-28 Fotoflug Cuxhaven Wilhelmshaven DSCF9603

Schillig (German pronunciation: [ˈʃɪlɪç]) is a village in the Friesland district of Lower Saxony in Germany. It is situated on the west coast of Jade Bay and is 20 km (12 mi) north of the town of Wilhelmshaven. As of 2011 the population was 113.

The approaches to the Bay and Willhelmshaven are known in English as the Schillig Roads.

On arrival in Schillig by car, one chooses from two routes; to the left (North West), on the land-side of the sea barrier, are a farm and farm land, a few houses, small blocks of flats, one or two hotels and shops and foot access to the top of the sea barrier and beyond. To the right (North East) the road leads over the sea barrier towards the camping, beach and parking areas. But access to these areas is only available by car once payment of parking/access charges has been made at the automated barriers.
