= Paravane (water kite) =

Towed hydrofoiled underwater object

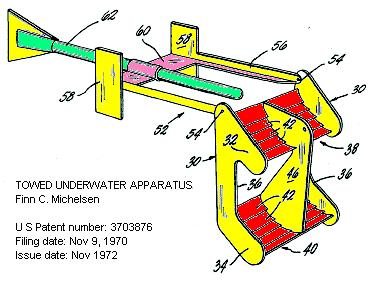
Towed winged unpowered water kite

The paravane /ˈpærəveɪn/ is a towed winged (hydrofoiled) underwater object—a water kite. Paravanes have been used in sport or commercial fishing, marine exploration and industry, sports and military applications. The wings of paravanes are sometimes in a fixed position, else positioned remotely or by actions of a human pilot. Pioneer parafoil developer Domina Jalbert considered water kites hardly different from air kites. However, paravanes generally orient themselves in respect to the water surface. They may have sensors that record or transmit data or are used entirely for generating a holding force like a sea anchor does. While a sea anchor allows a vessel to drift more slowly downwind, the paravane travels sideways to the pull at one to several times the pulling speed. Paravanes are, like air kites, often symmetrical in one axis and travel in two directions, the change being effected by gybing, shunting, or flipping over.

== Military uses ==
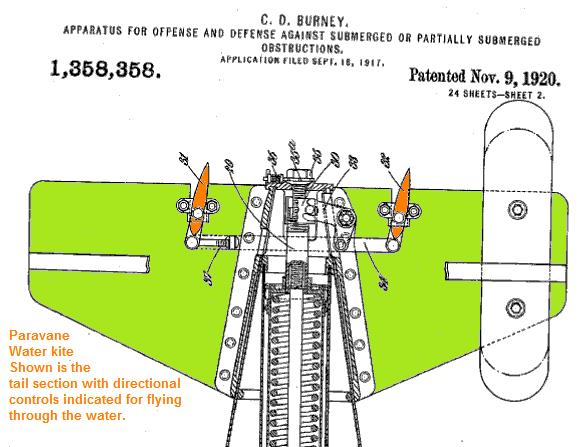
Paravane patent in 1920

The paravane /ˈpærəveɪn/, a form of towed underwater "glider" with a warhead that was used in anti-submarine warfare, was developed from 1914 to 1916 by Commander C. Vivian Usborne and Lieutenant C. Dennistoun Burney, funded by Sir George White, founder of the Bristol Aeroplane Company. It was used against naval mines and submarines. A different variety of paravane was developed by the British inventor Sir Dennistoun Burney as a means to sweep enemy mines. Towed behind a ship, the paravane wire would either cut the mine's mooring cable or bring the mine and paravane together, detonating the mine. There are offensive and defensive paravanes.

Initially developed to destroy naval mines, the paravane is strung out and streamed alongside the towing ship, often from the bow, but in World War II aboard minesweepers, the paravane was towed from the stern. The wings of the paravane pull it away laterally from the towing ship, placing a tension on the tow cable. If the tow cable snags the cable anchoring a mine then the anchoring cable is cut by jaws on the paravane, allowing the mine to float to the surface, where it is destroyed by gunfire. If the anchor cable fails to part, the mine and the paravane are brought together and the mine explodes against the paravane. The cable can then be retrieved and a replacement paravane fitted.

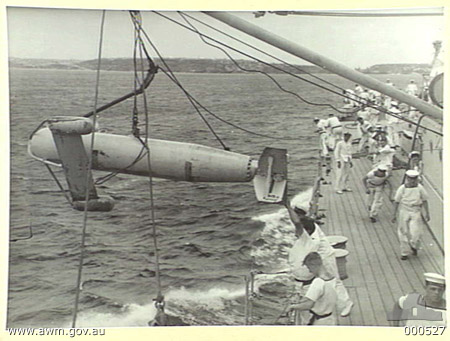
A paravane being lowered into the sea from an Australian warship in 1940

Burney developed explosive paravanes as an anti-submarine weapon, a "high speed sweep". It was a paravane, containing 80 lb (36 kg) of TNT towed by an armoured electric cable. The warhead was fired automatically as soon as the submarine touched the paravane or towing cable, or manually from the ship's bridge. It could be quickly deployed into the water and towed up to 25 kn (46 km/h; 29 mph) and recovery was reasonably simple.

== In commercial fishing ==
There are arrowhead paravanes, flexi-wing paravanes, and bi-wing paravanes; these water kites are used in tuna fishing operations. Trolling-for-fish devices that are paravanes or water kites do not always use the descriptor; George Dahl in 1957 taught how to kite his device underwater in order to place bait at the desired depth; and he wanted to have a boat have several of the devices being towed at the same time without the devices and bait interfering with each other—so his device was able to be set for different deflections, that is, the various water kites would be set to fly in the water at specified positions.

== In marine industry ==
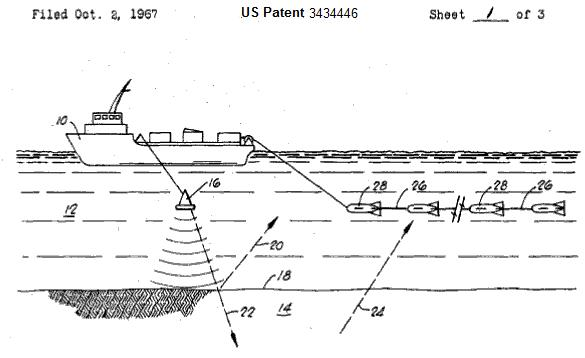
Water kiting...paravaning in marine industry

Water kites help depress cables being placed as well as other payloads (instruments, water-sampling collection, sea-life collection).

== In sport fishing ==
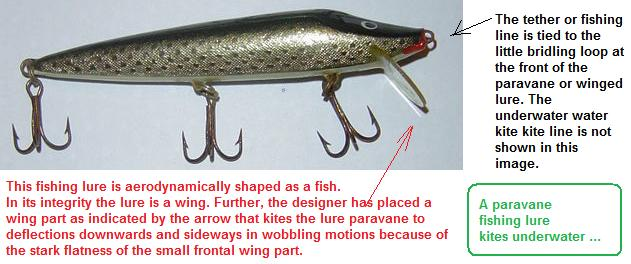
Fish lure water kite, a paravane

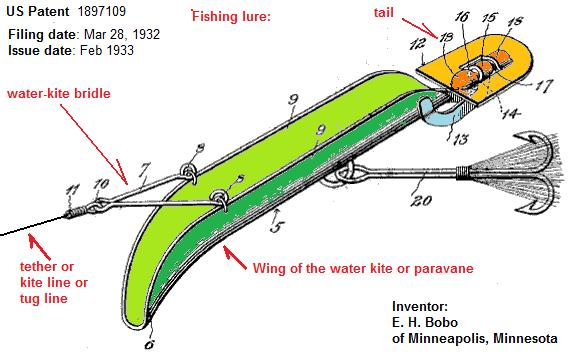
Fishing lure paravane water kite has a tail that is set to control the movement of the lure wing body.

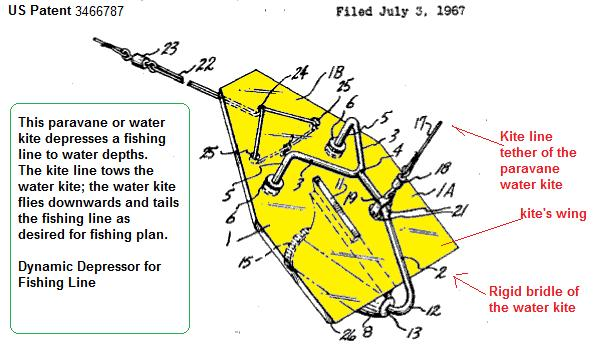
This water kite has a tail as the target fishing line; the kite's wing depresses the fishing line to desired depth. This paravane is used in sport fishing.

Diving paravane used in recreational trolling fishing

In 1905 Martin Flegle of Minneapolis, Minnesota, invented a lighter-than-water water kite that could be operated from boats or from the shoreline for the purpose of trolling for fish. The paravane (water kite) would float on the surface of the water, but the vaning was in the water. The device would move oblique to the towing effort. His device's operation had a way to fully change directions.

Paravanes carry bait to specific depths. Some fishing lures are themselves paravanes.

== In sports and play ==
Towed human-on-board paravanes are used to transport explorers, Scuba divers, and spearfishers.

Speedsailing has been driving the use of water kites (paravanes). A group has developed an air kite that dynamically was coupled with a water kite that they also developed: French L'aile d'eau L'aile d'eau (mastless boat is a water kite or paravane) The group succeeded in having a double-kite system with one kite an air kite and the other kite a paravane water kite. The air kite pulled the submarine water kite; this constitutes sailing using two media: air and water, except that higher wind currents ca be utilised than with standard sailing.

Early work in coupling water kites was done by the late J.C. Hagedoorn, a geophysics professor at Delft University. His system coupled parafoils with water kites he named "hapas". Later experimenters also used the terminology "chien de mer" or "sea dog". Although early attempts to implement the human-on-board versions were unsuccessful, many experimenters have demonstrated smaller versions constituting a fundamentally simple sailing system: a kite in the air connected to a kite in the water. In 2011 and 2012 Sylvain Claudel demonstrated elevated human kite sailing using a "chien de mer" made by Didier Costes.

There is a race to break speedsailing 50-knot barrier. A major project is exploring a paravane to result in a non-heeling moment wing mast. 'Swedish Speed Sailing Challenge' holds people effecting such paravane use. Swedish Speed Challenge Paravane Sailing. Similar technology is found in Yellow Pages Endeavour; such speed record efforts are related to the Windjet Project. The Jellyfish Foiler is a water kite hydrofoil tugged by an air kite reaching for breaking speed sailing records. A State of the Art Hydroptere Powered by Kite. The kite on the Jellyfish Foiler gives tension through a rigidized tether pulling on the water-kite hydrofoil hydrodynamic center in order to avoid roll. Jellyfish Foiler technology. The Jellyfish Foiler lower hydrofoil has two J-shaped foils and one center T-foil rudder and is pulled by the upper air kite; the system is a closely coupled double-kite system (lower is water kite, upper is an air kite) resulting in a system that will fly through the air and water in an effort to break the 50-knot speed sailing record.

== In science ==
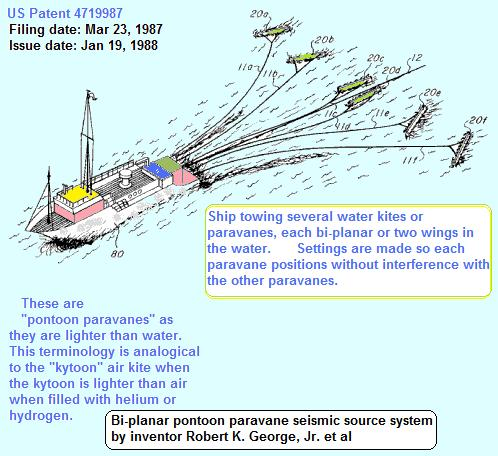
Pontoon paravane (analogy to air-kite kytoon kite) used in seismic array investigations.

Paravanes are used for sampling water chemistry; controlled kiting to specific depths allow scientists to map water qualities in the oceans and lakes of the world. An array of pontoon paravanes' wings are set so each water kite positions itself so it does not interfere with the others. One use has been the holding of seismic instruments.

== Patents ==
- U.S. patent 1,358,358 Apparatus for offense and defense against submerged or partially submerged obstructions, Filed Sep 18, 1917 - Burney's patent on the paravane idea
- US Pat. 2556423 WATER KITE Herbert L. Gross. Filed Apr 26, 1949.
- Water Kite. Filing date: Apr 27, 1951
- Water kite and method of using the same Kenneth D. Anderson
- Tripanel hydrodynamic depressor for fishing. Filing date: Mar 12, 1993.
- TROLLING DEVICE George H. M. Dahl. Filing date: Oct 3, 1957.
- US Pat. 3703876 Underwater Towed Apparatus. Inventor Finn C. Michelsen. Filed in 1970.
- UNDERWATER FISHING KITE Clissolde L. Louthan
- U.S. patent 2,462,568 Water Kite
- 1881 U.S. patent 242,278 described use of a water kite.
- Bathometer
- US Patent 4719987 Bi-planar pontoon paravane seismic source system by Robert K. George, Jr., Lorton E. Trent, and Ernest R. Harrison, filed March 23, 1987.

== See also ==
- Autonomous underwater vehicle – Uncrewed underwater vehicle with autonomous guidance system
- Foilboard – Surfboard with a downward-extending hydrofoil
- Kite applications – Uses of flying kites
- Kite mooring – Methods used to secure a kite in flight
- Kite types – Tethered objects which fly by aerodynamic forces
- Otter board – Board used to keep the mouth of a trawl net open
- Sailing hydrofoil – Sailboat with wing-like foils mounted under the hull
- Sea Tails
- Surface water sports
- Underwater glider – Type of autonomous underwater vehicle
- DeepFlight Super Falcon – Winged personal submarine
- Towboard – Underwater survey equipment used to tow a diver
