= 3.7 cm SK C/30 =

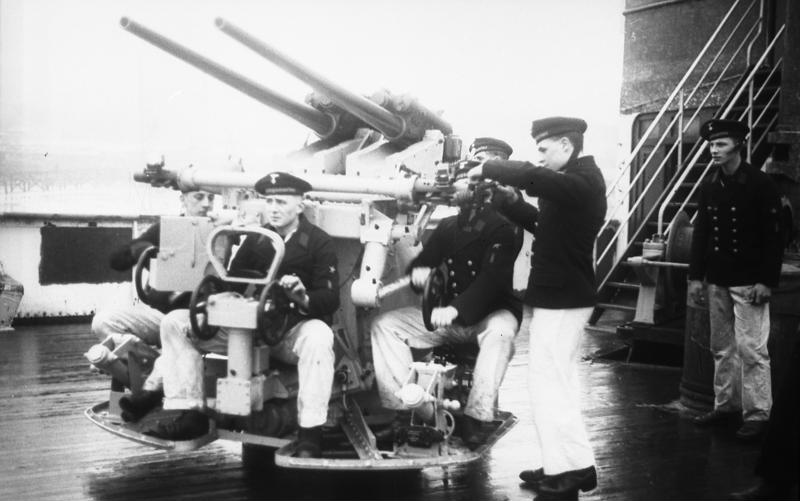
- 3.7 cm SK C/30 on a Dopp L C/30 stabilized mount
- Type: Anti-aircraft cannon
- Place of origin: Nazi Germany

Service history
- In service: 1935–1966
- Used by: Nazi Germany; Spain; Bulgaria
- Wars: Second World War

Production history
- Designer: Rheinmetall
- Designed: 1930–1935
- Manufacturer: Rheinmetall
- Produced: 1935–1943
- Variants: 3.7 cm SK C/30U

Specifications
- Mass: 243 kilograms (536 lb)
- Length: 3.074 metres (10 ft 1 in)
- Barrel length: 2.962 metres (9 ft 9 in) L/83
- Shell: fixed, cased charge
- Shell weight: 0.68 kilograms (1 lb 8 oz)
- Caliber: 37 x 380 mm R
- Action: single-shot
- Breech: semi-automatic, vertical sliding-block
- Elevation: depends on the mount
- Traverse: 360°
- Rate of fire: 30 rpm (practical)
- Muzzle velocity: 1,000 m/s (3,300 ft/s)
- Effective firing range: 2,000 m (6,600 ft) (effective ceiling)
- Maximum firing range: 8,500 m (9,300 yd) at 37.5°

The 3.7 cm SK C/30 (Note: SK - Schnelladekanone (quick loading cannon); C - Construktionsjahr (year of design)) was the German Kriegsmarine's primary 3.7 cm (1.5 in) anti-aircraft gun during the Second World War. It was superseded by the fully automatic 3.7 cm FlaK 43 late in the war.

== Description ==
The C/30 was a semi-automatic anti-aircraft gun (ie; after firing each round, the breech opened and the spent cartridge casing was automatically expelled, ready for the next round to be loaded), and it was hand-loaded one round at a time. This mechanism gave the weapon an effective, sustained, firing rate of 30 rounds per minute. Whilst not uncompetitive with contemporary and earlier designs of semi-automatic light gun, it was far inferior to the 120 rpm cyclic firing rate of its (slightly later-designed) wartime contemporary, the fully automatic Bofors 40 mm anti-aircraft gun. The C/30's muzzle velocity was, on the other hand, about 12-15% higher than the Bofors; this slightly eased the aiming. The SK C/30U gun was modified for use by submarines. All mountings were suitable for use against both air and soft surface targets.

Ship classes that carried the 3.7 cm SK C/30 include:

- Admiral Hipper-class cruisers
- Bismarck-class battleships
- Chamois-class minesweeping sloops
- Deutschland-class battleships
- Deutschland-class cruisers
- Elbing-class torpedo boats
- F-class escort ships
- German Type IXA submarines
- German Type XIV submarines
- Graf Zeppelin-class aircraft carriers
- Königsberg-class cruisers
- Leipzig-class cruisers
- M-class minesweepers
- PA-class patrol ships
- R boats
- Sperrbrecher
- Scharnhorst-class battleships
- Type 1934A-class destroyers
- Type 1936-class destroyers
- Type 1936A-class destroyers
- Type 1936B destroyers
- Type 35 torpedo boats
- Type 37 torpedo boats

=== Mountings ===
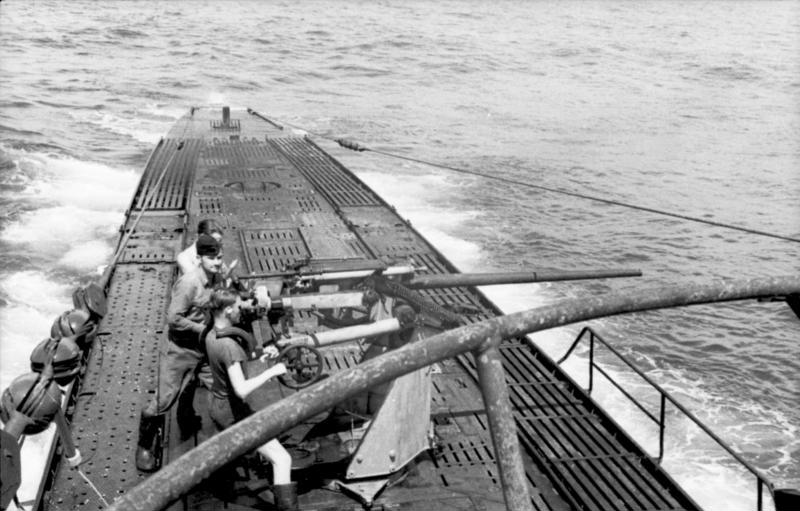
SK C/30U on a type IX U-Boat (U-103) in 1939

The Doppellafette C/30 (Dopp L C/30) was a twin mount with each gun in a separate cradle. It had a six-man crew on the mount itself plus additional ammunition handlers. The mounting was manually traversed and elevated and was gyro-stabilized up to a limit of 19.5° degrees to counteract the roll and pitch of the ship. Most German ships, fleet torpedo boat or larger, carried at least one Dopp L C/30 mounting. The Einheitslafette C/34 (Einh L C/34, universal mounting model 34) was a single gun mounted on a pedestal with a two-man crew. Some mounts were fitted with a 8-millimetre (0.31 in) gun shield. It was used on the smaller Kriegsmarine ships like the Schnellboot. A number were used on land to supplement the anti-aircraft defenses of ports. The Ubts L C/39 submarine mount used the SK C/30U gun. It was a simple pedestal mount with a two-man crew, one of whom trained the gun with the shoulder stirrup; the other used gears to elevate the gun.

Mounting	weight	elevation
Dopp L C/30	3,670 kg (8,090 lb)	-9° to +85°
Einh L C/34	1,860–2,020 kg (4,100–4,450 lb)	-10° to +80°
Ubts L C/39	1,450 kg (3,200 lb)	-10° to +90°

=== Ammunition ===
The SK C/30 used two types of tracer rounds. The 3.7 cm Br Sprgr Patr 40 L/4.1 Lh 37M was a high-explosive round with an incendiary filling while the 3.7 cm Sprgr Patr 40 L/4.1 Lh 37 lacked the incendiary fill, but was otherwise identical. Tracers were available in red, yellow or white and were marked on the shell by a painted band of the appropriate color. A complete round weighed 1.78 kilograms (3.9 lb).

=== Comparison of anti-aircraft guns ===
Country	Gun Model	RPM	Projectile Weight	Weight of fire
Nazi Germany	3.7 cm SK C/30	30	740 g (1.63 lb)	22.2 kg (49 lb)
France	Canon de 37 mm Modèle 1925	15–21	720 g (1.59 lb)	10.8–15.12 kg (23.8–33.3 lb)
Italy	Cannone-Mitragliera da 37/54 (Breda)	60–120	820 g (1.81 lb)	49.2–98.4 kg (108–217 lb)
United States	37 mm Gun M1	120	610 g (1.34 lb)	73.2 kg (161 lb)
Nazi Germany	3.7 cm Flak 18/36/37/43	150	640 g (1.41 lb)	96 kg (212 lb)
Soviet Union	37 mm automatic air defense gun M1939 (61-K)	160-170	730 g (1.61 lb)	116.8–124.1 kg (257–274 lb)
United Kingdom	QF 2-pounder naval gun	115	910 g (2.01 lb)	104.6 kg (231 lb)
Sweden	Bofors 40 mm gun	120	900 g (2.0 lb)	108 kg (238 lb)
