= List of Kriegsmarine ships =

The list of Kriegsmarine ships includes all ships commissioned into the Kriegsmarine, the navy of Nazi Germany, during its existence from 1935 to the conclusion of World War II in 1945.

See the list of naval ships of Germany for ships in German service throughout the country's history.

== Capital ships ==
=== Pre-dreadnought battleships ===
Class	Displacement (standard)	Main battery	Speed	Ship	Image	Commis- sioned	Fate
Deutschland class	15,000 tons	4 × 11-in.	18 kn	Hannover		Oct 1907	Scrapped between 1944 and 1946
Deutschland class	15,000 tons	4 × 11-in.	19.1 kn	Schleswig-Holstein		Jul 1908	Scuttled, Mar 1945
Deutschland class	15,000 tons	4 × 11-in.	18.5 kn	Schlesien		May 1908	Mined off Swinemünde in May 1945

=== Modern battleships ===
Class	Displacement (standard)	Main battery	Speed	Ship	Image	Commis- sioned	War loss
Bismarck class	Bismarck: 41,700 tons Tirpitz: 42,900 tons	8 × 15-in.	30 kn	Bismarck		Aug 1940	Scuttled following incapacitating battle damage, May 1941
Bismarck class	Bismarck: 41,700 tons Tirpitz: 42,900 tons	8 × 15-in.	30 kn	Tirpitz		Feb 1941	Sunk by air attack, Nov 1944
Scharnhorst class	32,100 tons	9 × 11-in.	31 kn	Scharnhorst		Jan 1939	Sunk by gunfire, Dec 1943
Scharnhorst class	32,100 tons	9 × 11-in.	31 kn	Gneisenau		May 1938	Sunk as a blockship, Mar 1945

== Cruisers ==
=== Heavy cruisers ===
Class	Displacement (standard)	Main battery	Speed	Ship	Image	Commis- sioned	War loss	Postwar
Deutschland class	14,290 tons	6 × 11-in.	28 kn	Deutschland; renamed Lützow Jan 1940		Apr 1933	Air attack Baltic Sea, Apr 1945	
Deutschland class	14,290 tons	6 × 11-in.	28 kn	Admiral Scheer		Nov 1934	Air attack Kiel, Apr 1945	
Deutschland class	14,290 tons	6 × 11-in.	28 kn	Admiral Graf Spee		Jan 1936	Scuttled Montevideo, Dec 1939	
Admiral Hipper class	18,200 tons	8 × 8-in.	32 kn	Admiral Hipper		Apr 1939	Scuttled Kiel, May 1945	
Admiral Hipper class	18,200 tons	8 × 8-in.	32 kn	Blücher		Sep 1939	Sunk Drøbak Sound, Apr 1940	
Admiral Hipper class	18,200 tons	8 × 8-in.	32 kn	Prinz Eugen		Aug 1940		Prize of US

=== Light cruisers ===
Class	Displacement (standard)	Main battery	Speed	Ship	Image	Commis- sioned	War loss	Postwar
Emden	6,990 tons	8 × 5.9-in.	29.5 kn	Emden		Oct 1925	Scuttled Heikendorf, May 1945	
Königsberg class	7,700 tons	9 × 5.9-in.	32 kn	Königsberg		Apr 1929	Air attack Bergen, Apr 1940	
Königsberg class	7,700 tons	9 × 5.9-in.	32 kn	Karlsruhe		Nov 1929	Scuttled off Kristiansand, Apr 1940	
Königsberg class	7,700 tons	9 × 5.9-in.	32 kn	Köln		Jan 1930	Air attack Wilhelmshaven, Mar 1945	
Leipzig class	8,900 tons**	9 × 5.9-in.	32 kn	Leipzig		Oct 1931		Scuttled, Jun 1946
Leipzig class	8,900 tons**	9 × 5.9-in.	32 kn	Nürnberg		Nov 1935		Prize of USSR

== Destroyers and torpedo boats ==
=== Named destroyers ===
Class	Displace- ment	Torpedo load	Speed	Image	Ship	War loss	Postwar
Type 1934 destroyers	3,155 tons	8 × 21-in.	36 kn		Z1 Leberecht Maass	Sunk, Feb 1940	
Type 1934 destroyers	3,155 tons	8 × 21-in.	36 kn		Z2 Georg Thiele	Beached, Apr 1940	
Type 1934 destroyers	3,155 tons	8 × 21-in.	36 kn		Z3 Max Schultz	Sunk w all hands, Feb 1940	
Type 1934 destroyers	3,155 tons	8 × 21-in.	36 kn		Z4 Richard Beitzen		Scrapped, 1949
Type 1934A destroyers	2,270 tons	8 × 21-in.	36 kn		Z5 Paul Jakobi		Scrapped, 1954
Type 1934A destroyers	2,270 tons	8 × 21-in.	36 kn		Z6 Theodor Riedel		Scrapped, 1958
Type 1934A destroyers	2,270 tons	8 × 21-in.	36 kn		Z7 Hermann Schoemann	Scuttled, May 1942	
Type 1934A destroyers	2,270 tons	8 × 21-in.	36 kn		Z8 Bruno Heinemann	Mined, Jan 1942	
Type 1934A destroyers	2,270 tons	8 × 21-in.	36 kn		Z9 Wolfgang Zenker	Scuttled, Apr 1940	
Type 1934A destroyers	2,270 tons	8 × 21-in.	36 kn		Z10 Hans Lody		Scrapped, 1949
Type 1934A destroyers	2,270 tons	8 × 21-in.	36 kn		Z11 Bernd von Arnim	Scuttled, Apr 1940	
Type 1934A destroyers	2,270 tons	8 × 21-in.	36 kn		Z12 Erich Giese	Sunk, Apr 1940	
Type 1934A destroyers	2,270 tons	8 × 21-in.	36 kn		Z13 Erich Koellner	Scuttled, Apr 1940	
Type 1934A destroyers	2,270 tons	8 × 21-in.	36 kn		Z14 Friedrich Ihn		Scrapped, 1952
Type 1934A destroyers	2,270 tons	8 × 21-in.	36 kn		Z15 Erich Steinbrinck		Scrapped, 1958
Type 1934A destroyers	2,270 tons	8 × 21-in.	36 kn		Z16 Friedrich Eckoldt	Sunk, Dec 1942	
Type 1936 destroyers	3,470 tons	8 × 21-in.	36 kn		Z17 Diether von Roeder	Scuttled, Apr 1940	
Type 1936 destroyers	3,470 tons	8 × 21-in.	36 kn		Z18 Hans Lüdemann	Scuttled, Apr 1940	
Type 1936 destroyers	3,470 tons	8 × 21-in.	36 kn		Z19 Hermann Künne	Scuttled, Apr 1940	
Type 1936 destroyers	3,470 tons	8 × 21-in.	36 kn		Z20 Karl Galster		Scrapped, 1958
Type 1936 destroyers	3,470 tons	8 × 21-in.	36 kn		Z21 Wilhelm Heidkamp	Sunk, Apr 1940	
Type 1936 destroyers	3,470 tons	8 × 21-in.	36 kn		Z22 Anton Schmitt	Sunk, Apr 1940	

=== Numbered destroyers ===
Class	Displace- ment	Torpedo load	Speed	Image	Ship	War loss	Postwar
Type 1936A (Narvik) destroyers	2,657 tons	8 × 21-in.	36 kn		Z23	Scuttled, Aug 1944	
Type 1936A (Narvik) destroyers	2,657 tons	8 × 21-in.	36 kn		Z24	Air attack, Aug 1944	
Type 1936A (Narvik) destroyers	2,657 tons	8 × 21-in.	36 kn		Z25		Prize of France
Type 1936A (Narvik) destroyers	2,657 tons	8 × 21-in.	36 kn		Z26	Sunk, Mar 1942	
Type 1936A (Narvik) destroyers	2,657 tons	8 × 21-in.	36 kn		Z27	Sunk, Dec 1943	
Type 1936A (Narvik) destroyers	2,657 tons	8 × 21-in.	36 kn		Z28	Air attack, Mar 1945	
Type 1936A (Narvik) destroyers	2,657 tons	8 × 21-in.	36 kn		Z29		Scuttled, 1946
Type 1936A (Narvik) destroyers	2,657 tons	8 × 21-in.	36 kn		Z30		Scrapped, 1948
Type 1936A (Mob)	2,657 tons	8 × 21-in.	36 kn		Z31		Prize of France
Type 1936A (Mob)	2,657 tons	8 × 21-in.	36 kn		Z32	Grounded, Jun 1944	
Type 1936A (Mob)	2,657 tons	8 × 21-in.	36 kn		Z33		Prize of USSR
Type 1936A (Mob)	2,657 tons	8 × 21-in.	36 kn		Z34		Scuttled, 1946
Type 1936A (Mob)	2,657 tons	8 × 21-in.	36 kn		Z37	Scuttled, Aug 1944	
Type 1936A (Mob)	2,657 tons	8 × 21-in.	36 kn		Z38		Prize of UK
Type 1936A (Mob)	2,657 tons	8 × 21-in.	36 kn		Z39		Prize of US
Type 1936B destroyer	3,542 tons	8 × 21-in.	36 kn	No image available	Z35	Mined, Dec 1944	
Type 1936B destroyer	3,542 tons	8 × 21-in.	36 kn	No image available	Z36	Mined, Dec 1944	
Type 1936B destroyer	3,542 tons	8 × 21-in.	36 kn	No image available	Z43	Scuttled, May 1945	
Type 1936B destroyer	3,542 tons	8 × 21-in.	36 kn	No image available	Z45		Scrapped, 1946
Type 1936C destroyer	3,625 tons	8 × 21-in.	37.5 kn	No image available	Z46	Blown up, 1945	
Type 1936C destroyer	3,625 tons	8 × 21-in.	37.5 kn	No image available	Z47	Blown up, 1945	

=== Torpedo boats ===
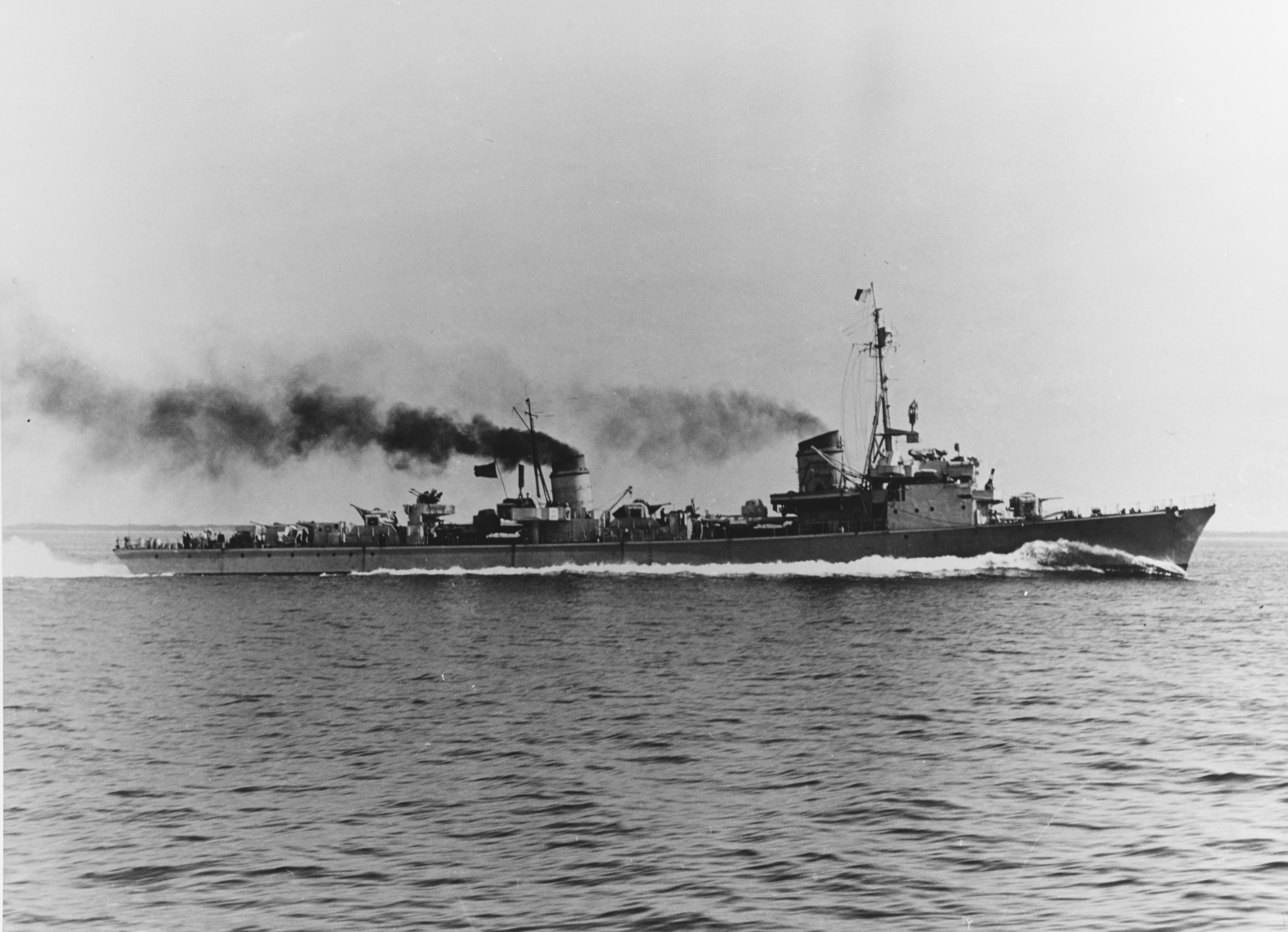
The Type 39 torpedo boat T35 in American service as DD-935

- Torpedoboot 1923 ("Raubvogel") (900 tons, 3 × 105 mm guns)
  - Möwe
  - Falke
  - Greif
  - Kondor
  - Albatros
  - Seeadler
- Torpedoboot 1924 ("Raubtier") (950 tons, 3 × 105 mm guns)
  - Wolf
  - Iltis
  - Jaguar
  - Leopard
  - Luchs
  - Tiger
- Torpedoboot 1935 (1,090 tons, 1 × 105 mm gun)
  - T1 through T12
- Torpedoboot 1937 (1,150 tons, 1 × 105 mm gun)
  - T13 through T21
- Flottentorpedoboot 1939 (Elbing) (1,750 tons, 4 × 105 mm guns)
  - T22 through T36

== Auxiliary cruisers ==
- Atlantis
- Coronel
- Hansa
- Komet
- Kormoran
- Michel
- Orion
- Pinguin
- Stier
- Thor
- Widder

== Mine warfare craft ==
=== Minelayers ===
- Tannenberg 1935 (5,500 tons, 3 × 150 mm guns, 460 mines)
- Brandenburg 1936 (3,900 tons, 3 × 105 mm guns, 250 mines)
- Lothringen 1941 (2,000 tons, 2 × 88 mm guns, 200 mines)
- Niedersachsen 1934 (1,800 tons, 2 × 105 mm guns, 260 mines)
- Hansestadt Danzig 1939 (2,431 tons, 2 × 88 mm guns, 360 mines)
- Romania 1942 (3,152 tons, 4 x 20 mm guns, 80 mines)
- Drache 1924 (1,800 tons, 2 × 88 mm guns, 120 mines)
- Brummer 1940 (3 × 10.5 cm guns, 2 × 3.7 cm anti-aircraft guns, 10 × 2 cm anti-aircraft guns, 4 × 46 cm torpedo tubes, 280 mines)
- Oldenburg 1934 (1,200 tons, 2 × 88 mm guns, 145 mines)
- Kamerun 1939 (370 tons, 2 × 88 mm guns, 100 mines)
- Togo 1939 (370 tons, 2 × 88 mm guns, 100 mines)
- Kiebitz 1943

=== Sperrbrecher ===
- Sperrbrecher 1 – Sperrbrecher 100 (5,000 tons, 2 × 88 mm guns)

=== Minesweeper ===
- M1935 class (875 tons, 2 × 105 mm guns)
  - M1 – M69
- M1940 class (775 tons, 1 × 105 mm gun)
  - M70 – M196
- M1943 class (825 tons, 2 × 105 mm guns)
  - M197 – M214

=== R Boats ===
- R1 class 1929 (60 tons, 1 × 37 mm gun, 6 mines)
  - R1 – R16
- R17 class 1934 (115 tons, 1 × 37 mm gun, 12 mines)
  - R17 – R24
- R25 class 1938 (110 tons, 1 × 37 mm gun, 12 mines)
  - R25 – R40
- R41 class 1939 (125 tons, 1 × 37 mm gun, 12 mines)
  - R41 – R129
- R130 class 1940 (150 tons, 1 × 37 mm gun, 12 mines)
  - R130 – R150
- R151 class 1940 (125 tons, 1 × 37 mm gun, 12 mines)
  - R151 – R217
- R218 class 1942 (140 tons, 1 × 37 mm gun, 16 mines)
  - R218 – R300
- R301 class 1942 (160 tons, 1 × 88 mm gun, 16 mines, 2 torpedo tubes)
  - R301 – R312

=== Mine hunters ===
- KM1 – KM36

== Small craft ==
=== S-boats ===
- S1 class (50 tons, 1 × 20 mm gun, 2 torpedo tubes)
  - S1 – S25
- S26 class (75 tons, 1 × 20 mm gun, 2 torpedo tubes)
  - S26 – S29
- S30 class (80 tons, 1 × 20 mm gun, 2 torpedo tubes)
  - S30 – S37
- S38 class (80 tons, 1 × 20 mm gun, 2 torpedo tubes)
  - S38 – S60
- S38b class (90 tons, 2 × 20 mm guns, 2 torpedo tubes)
  - S61 – S99
- S100 class (100 tons, 1 × 37 mm gun, 2 torpedo tubes)
  - S100 – S150
- S151 class (100 tons, 1 × 37 mm gun, 2 torpedo tubes)
  - S151 – S205

== U-boats ==
=== Training submarines ===
- Type I
  - U-25 and U-26

=== Coastal submarines ===
- Type IIA
  - U-1 through U-6
- Type IIB
  - U-7 through U-24
  - U-120 and U-121
- Type IIC
  - U-56 through U-63
- Type IID
  - U-137 through U-152
- Type XVIIB
  - U-1405 through U-1407

=== Ocean-going submarines ===
- Type VIIA
  - U-27 through U-36
- Type VIIB
  - U-45 through U-55
  - U-73 through U-76
  - U-83 through U-87
  - U-99 through U-102
- Type VIIC
  - U-69 through U-72
  - U-77 through U-82
  - U-88 through U-98
  - U-132 through U-136
  - U-201 through U-212
  - U-221 through U-232
  - U-235 through U-291
  - U-301 through U-316
  - U-331 through U-394
  - U-396 through U-458
  - U-465 through U-486
  - U-551 through U-683
  - U-701 through U-722
  - U-731 through U-768
  - U-771 through U-779
  - U-821 through U-822
  - U-825 and U-826
  - U-901 through U-907
  - U-921 through U-928
  - U-951 through U-994
  - U-1051 through U-1058
  - U-1101 and U-1102
  - U-1131 and U-1132
  - U-1161 and U-1162
  - U-1191 through U-1210
- Type VIIC 41
  - U-292 through U-300
  - U-317 through U-328
  - U-827 and U-828
  - U-929 and U-930
  - U-995 through U-1010
  - U-1013 through U-1025
  - U-1063 through U-1065
  - U-1103 through U-1110
  - U-1163 through U-1172
  - U-1271 through U-1279
  - U-1301 through U-1308
- Type IXA
  - U-37 through U-44
- Type IXB
  - U-64 and U-65
  - U-103 through U-111
  - U-122 through U-124
- Type IXC
  - U-66 through U-68
  - U-125 through U-131
  - U-153 through U-166
  - U-171 through U-176
  - U-501 through U-524
- Type IXC 40
  - U-167 through U-170
  - U-183 through U-194
  - U-525 through U-550
  - U-801 through U-806
  - U-841 through U-846
  - U-853 through U-858
  - U-877 through U-882
  - U-885 through U-899
  - U-1221 through U-1235
- Type IXD
  - U-177 through U-182
  - U-195 through U-200
  - U-847 through U-852
  - U-859 through U-864
  - U-871 through U-876

=== Minelaying submarines ===
- Type VIID
  - U-213 through U-218
- Type XB
  - U-116 through U-119

=== Supply submarines ===
- Type VIIF
  - U-1059 through U-1062
- Type IXD /42
  - U-883 and U-884
- Type XB
  - U-219 and U-220
  - U-233 and U-234
- Type XIV
  - U-459 through U-464
  - U-487 through U-490

=== Electric boats ===
- Type XXI
  - U-2501 through U-2531
  - U-2533 through U-2548
  - U-2551 and U-2552
  - U-3001 through U-3044
  - U-3501 through U-3530
- Type XXIII
  - U-2321 through U-2371
  - U-4701 through U-4707
  - U-4709 through U-4712

=== Midget submarines ===
- Seehund (17 tons, 2 × torpedoes)
  - 138 commissioned
- Hecht (Training)
  - 53 commissioned
- Biber (6.5 tons, 2 × torpedoes)
  - 324 commissioned
- Molch (11 tons, 2 × torpedoes)
  - 393 commissioned
- Delphin (Prototype)
  - 3 commissioned
- Seeteufel (Prototype)
  - 1 commissioned
- Schwertwal (Prototype)
  - 1 commissioned

=== Human torpedoes ===
- Neger (1 × torpedo)
  - 200 commissioned
- Marder (3 tons, 1 × torpedo)
  - 500 commissioned
- Hai (Prototype)
  - 1 commissioned

== Auxiliary ships ==
=== Troop ships ===
- Cap Arcona, 1927
- Deutschland, 1923
- Goya, 1940
- General von Steuben, 1923
- Wilhelm Gustloff, 1937
- Hamburg, 1926
- Pretoria, 1936
- Albert Ballin/Hansa, 1923
- Urundi, 1923

=== Artillery training ships ===
- Bremse 1933 (1,800 tons, 4 × 127 mm guns)
- Brummer 1934 (3,000 tons, 8 × 105 mm guns, 480 mines)

=== Torpedo training ships ===
- Hugo Zeye, 1942

=== Radio-controlled targets ===
- Braunschweig class
  - Hessen, 1900
- Wittelsbach class
  - Zähringen, 1898

=== Sail training ships ===
- Gorch Fock, 1933 (Russian training ship Tovarishch)
- Horst Wessel, 1936 (US Coast Guard Ship Eagle)
- Albert Leo Schlageter, 1937 (Portuguese training ship Sagres)

=== Aviso ===
- Grille, 1934

=== Floating anti-aircraft batteries ===
- Arcona (Gazelle-class light cruiser)
- Medusa (Gazelle class light cruiser)
- Ariadne (ex-Dutch HNLMS Hertog Hendrik coastal defense ship)
- Niobe (ex-Dutch HNLMS Gelderland (1898) cruiser)
- Nymphe (ex-Norwegian HNoMS Tordenskjold coastal defense ship)
- Thetis (ex-Norwegian HNoMS Harald Haarfagre coastal defense ship)

=== Escort ===
- F class (700 tons, 2 × 105 mm guns)
  - F 1 – F 10
- PA class (925 tons, 1 × 105 mm gun)
  - PA 1 – PA 4

=== Gunboats ===
- LS1 – LS12
- The Following Gunboats were generally armed with one 5.9 inch, two 37mm (1×2) and six 20mm (6×1) guns.
  - August 400 tons Launched 1936
  - Berkelstrom
  - Cascade 338 tons Launched 1937
  - Globe 314 tons Launched 1937
  - Hast I
  - Helene 400 tons Launched 1937
  - Joost
  - Kemphaan 343 tons Launched 1936
  - Nijnberg
  - Oostzee 336 tons Launched 1936
  - Ost 565 tons Launched 1939
  - Paraat
  - Polaris 322 tons Launched 1936
  - Robert Müller 399 tons Launched 1936
  - Soemba
  - Trompenberg
  - West
  - West Vlaanderen 346 tons Launched 1927

=== Blockade runners/Auxiliary minelayers ===
- Doggerbank

=== Weather ships ===
- Adolf Vinnen (WBS 5)
- August Wriedt (WBS 8)
- Berlebek (WBS 7 / WBS 14)
- Coburg (WBS 2 )
- Externsteine (WBS 11)
- Hermann / Sachsen (WBS 1)
- Hessen (WBS 11 / WBS 8)
- Hinrich Freese (WBS 4)
- Hoheweg (WBS 5)
- Fritz Homann (WBS 3 / WBS 4)
- Kehdingen WBS 6)
- Carl J. Busch (WBS 3)
- Lauenburg (WBS 3)
- Leipzig
- Merceditta (WBS 9)
- Mob. FD 34 (WBS 10)
- München (WBS 6)
- Ostmark (WBS 5)
- Sachsenwald (WBS 7)
- Skudd 1 (WBS 10)
- Star XV (WBS 10)
- Teutoberger Wald (WBS 12)
- Wuppertal (WBS 1)

=== Hospital ships ===
- Berlin
- Birka
- Bordeaux
- Fasan
- Gradisca
- Huxter
- Lindau
- Mars
- Meteor
- Robert Ley
- Rostock
- Rügen
- Strassburg
- Stuttgart
- Wilhelm Gustloff

=== Fleet Tenders ===
- Saar
- Hela
- Tsingtau
- Adolf Lüderitz
- Carl Peters
- Otto Wünsche
- Waldemar Kophamel
- Wilhelm Bauer

== Patrol boats ==
Many vessels were requisitioned for use as vorpostenboote during the war.

== Icebreakers ==
- Castor
- Eisbär
- Eisvogel
- Pollux

== Captured foreign warships ==
A significant number of foreign warships were captured and recommissioned into the Kriegsmarine.

- Clemenceau, French battleship captured in 1940 while still under construction, but never completed. With Brest, France shipyard and drydock flooded and always under Allied bombers, it could never be completed.
- Faà di Bruno, laid down 1915, captured 1943, commissioned as monitor Biber, surrendered in 1945 and broken up.
- Sovetskaya Ukraina, laid down 1938, captured 1941 (never completed)
- HNLMS O 8, captured in 1940, taken into service as UD-1 used as training ship to train crews for the German U-boats. Decommissioned in 1943.
- HMS Seal, captured 1940, taken into service as UB
- The Danish training ship/coastal defense ship HDMS Niels Juel (1918) was refloated after an attempted destruction of the ship via running aground during Battle of Isefjord, disarmed and used as a training ship renamed Nordland by the Kriegsmarine. Scuttled a second time 3 May 1945, scrapped 1952.
- Four Norwegian Sleipner-class destroyers, HNoMS Gyller (1938), HNoMS Odin (1939), HNoMS Tor (1939), & HNoMS Balder (1939) were captured in 1940. All four ships saw service in the Kriegsmarine.
- Four French Flower-class corvettes, Arquebuse, Hallebarde, Sabre, & Poignard were captured in 1940 following the Fall of France. All except Poignard were completed and entered service as "Patrol vessels" PA 1 to PA 4 (the latter saw no service).
- HNLMS Gerard Callenburgh was scuttled to prevent her capture in 1940, but was nevertheless raised and commissioned into the Kriegsmarine as ZH1 in 1942.
- RHS Vasilefs Georgios was scuttled to prevent her captured in 1941, but was raised and commissioned into the Kriegsmarine as Hermes in 1942.
- French destroyer L'Opiniâtre was captured while still under construction. Germany intended to completed her, but construction was halted in 1943 and broken up for scrap that year.
- HNLMS De Zeven Provinciën (C802) and HNLMS De Ruyter (C801) light cruisers were captured in 1940 while still under construction. Renamed as KH1 and KH2 ("KH" means "Kreuzer Holland"), modified to fit an Atlantic Bow and redesigned for new German armament. Work was resume to be completed, but with very slow progress due to sabotage from the Dutch Resistance. KH1 was launched in 1944 to be use as blockship. Both ships were completed with a modernized post WW II design and commissioned into Dutch service in 1953.
- KB Dalmacija was a WW1 Imperial Germany light cruiser (SMS Niobe), sold to Yugoslavia in 1925 (KB Dalmacija), captured by Italy in 1941 (RN Cattaro), then by Germany following the Italian Armistice in 1943 and renamed Niobe. She was sunk by British torpedo boats.
- KB Dubrovnik was captured first by Italy in 1941 (RN Premuda), then by German following the Italian Armistice in 1943 (TA 32). She was scuttled in Genoa in 1945 following the Battle of the Ligurian Sea.
- KB Beograd was captured first by Italy in 1941 (RN Sebenico), then by German following the Italian Armistice in 1943 (TA 43). She was sunk in Trieste, though sources vary of how so.
- KB T3 was captured first by Italy, then by German following the Italian Armistice in 1943. She was sunk by Allied aircraft in February 1945.
- Four Yugoslav Orjen-class torpedo boat (KB Velebit, KB Dinara, KB Triglav and KB Rudnik) were captured first by Italy in 1941 (MS 42, MS 43, MS 44 and MS 46), then by German following the Italian Armistice in 1943 (S 601, S 602, S 603 and S 604). All four were scuttled in 1944.
- KB Zmaj was captured in 1941 and used as a troop transport until her sinking in 1944.
- Yugoslav minelayer D2 was captured first by Italy, then by German following the Italian Armistice in 1943. She was sunk in 1944.

== Unfinished ships ==
=== Aircraft carriers ===
- Graf Zeppelin class
  - Graf Zeppelin, Laid down 1936, commissioned 1938 (85% complete at start of war, never completed)*
  - Flugzeugträger B, Laid Down 1938, never launched, broken up 1940*

=== Heavy cruisers ===
- Seydlitz, (uncompleted, intended for conversion into light aircraft carrier, but never completed)
- Lützow, (sold uncompleted to Soviet Union in 1940)

=== Destroyers ===
- Zerstörer 1936C
- Zerstörer 1938A/Ac
- Zerstörer 1938B
- Zerstörer 1942: Z51 launched 1944, but bombed and never completed
- Zerstörer 1944
- Zerstörer 1945
- Spähkreuzer

=== Torpedo boats ===
- Flottentorpedoboot 1940 (Never completed)
- Flottentorpedoboot 1941 (Never completed)
- Flottentorpedoboot 1944 (Never completed)

A multitude of other ships also remained unfinished by the end of the war: escorts, gunboats, landing craft, fleet tenders, AA batteries, training ships, auxiliary ships, patrol boats, minelayers, mine hunters, fast torpedo attack boats (E-Boats) and more.

== See also ==
- List of ships of the Second World War
