= German fleet tender Hela =

Fleet tender of Nazi Germany

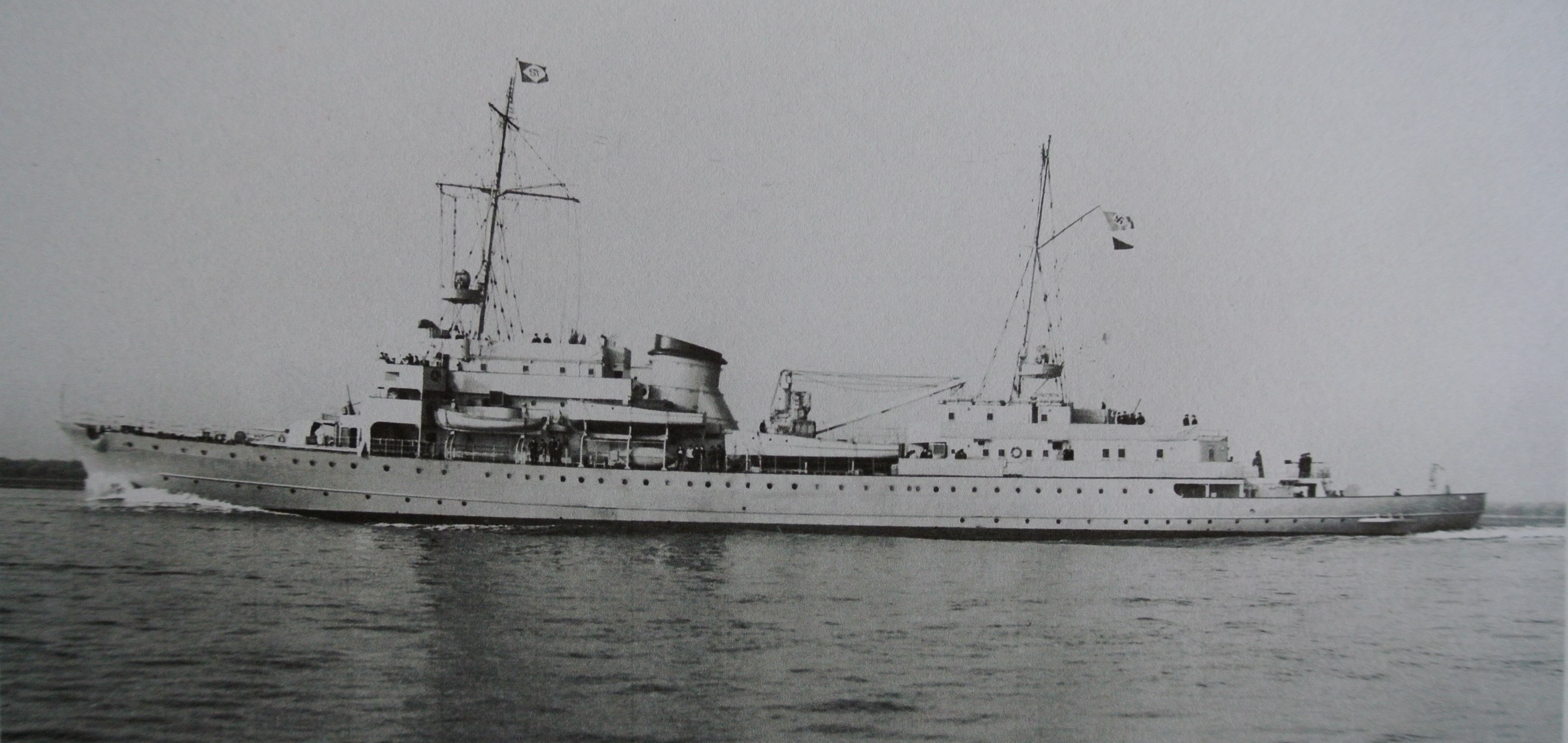
- Hela during sea trials in 1941

History

Nazi Germany
- Name: Hela
- Namesake: Ersatz Hela
- Ordered: 1936
- Builder: Stülckenwerft
- Laid down: 23 November 1937
- Launched: 29 December 1938
- Acquired: 16 October 1940
- Commissioned: 16 October 1940
- Decommissioned: 8 May 1945
- Fate: Transferred to Soviet Union, 25 December 1945

History

Russia
- Name: Angara; (Ангара)
- Namesake: Angara
- Acquired: 25 December 1945
- Commissioned: 13 May 1946
- Renamed: PKZ-14, January 1996
- Fate: Scrapped, November 2019

General characteristics
- Type: Tender ship
- Displacement: 2,520 tonnes (2,480 long tons) at full load
- Length: 99.80 m (327 ft 5 in)
- Beam: 12.08 m (39 ft 8 in)
- Draft: 4.05 m (13 ft 3 in)
- Propulsion: 4 × MAN 6-cyl diesel engines; 2 × shafts; 4,720 hp (3,520 kW)
- Speed: 21 knots (39 km/h)
- Complement: 224-259 crew
- Armament: 2 × single 10.5 cm SK L/45 naval guns; 2 × single 3.7 cm SK C/30s; 1 × 2 cm Flak 30s

The Hela was a command ship of the Kriegsmarine, sometimes also known as an aviso. She was equipped with everything a fleet or squadron command staff needed, and the superstructures mainly contained work and accommodation rooms for a large staff.

== Development and design ==
The previously used fleet tender Hela, a former M1935 minesweeper, had become too small for the fleet staff, so a replacement was included in the 1936 state budget under the name of Ersatz Hela.

The ship had a length of 99.8 m over all or 92.5 m in the waterline and was 12.8 m wide, with a side height of 7.45 m and a maximum draft of 4.05 m maximum 2,520 tonnes (standard 2,113 tn.l.). The armament consisted of two 10.5-cm SK L / 45 C32 rapid-loading cannons, a 3.7-cm SK C / 30 and two 2.0-cm Flak C / 30 automatic cannons. There was a large crane amidships behind the funnel which was used for recovering the various barges and dinghies and loading ammunition and supplies. The original plans called for the Hela to carry an Arado Ar 196 A-1 seaplane launched by a catapult, but this was not implemented and the space was instead used for a staff car.

The procurement of the initially planned four MAN 9-cylinder four-stroke marine diesel engines of the type W 9 Vu 40/46 with Büchi supercharging, with a total planned 6300 hp, caused considerable difficulties and led to long construction delays. Eventually this plan was abandoned and the ship received two two-stroke six-cylinder diesel engines from MAN instead, which were removed from the incomplete cargo ship Sofia of the German Levante Line. Their total of 4720 hp gave the Hela a top speed of 20 knots over two shafts with volcano drives and propellers. The bunker supply of 280 t of diesel fuel enabled an action radius of 2000 nautical miles at a cruising speed of 15 knots.

The crew consisted of 224 to 259 men (without admiralty staff). In addition, officers and crew quarters were available for up to 108 other persons who would serve as staff on board.

== Construction and career ==
=== Service in the Kriegsmarine ===
She was laid down on 23 November 1937 and launched on 29 December 1938 at Stülckenwerft in Hamburg. After almost three years of construction, the ship was commissioned on 16 October 1940 under the command of Corvette Captain Paul Schulze and, after the test drives, were placed under the command of the fleet. From December 1940, she served as a command ship for the newly created office of the 2nd Admiral of the Fleet with his staff, at that time Rear Admiral Leopold Siemens (later Vice Admiral, 1889–1979).

On 5 May 1941, Hela brought Hitler to Gdynia, the so-called Gotenhafen during the German occupation from 1940 to 1945, where he visited Bismarck, which was in the roadstead, before it broke out into the Atlantic. After the sinking of the Bismarck only three weeks later, on 27 May 1941, in which the fleet chief Günther Lütjens and his entire staff were killed, the office of the 2nd admiral of the fleet was dissolved in order to create a new fleet command, and the Hela stood now available to the fleet command again until the end of the war. In October 1943, Corvette Captain Oswald Neumann took command of the ship, which he commanded until the end of the war.

On 16 April 1945, Hela was slightly damaged in a British air raid on Swinoujscie, the then German Swinemünde. Before the end of April, in view of the approaching Soviet armed forces, it was still possible to bring the ship across the Baltic Sea to Eckernförde under its own power, where it was confiscated by Great Britain after Germany's surrender. While the naval officers, regarded by the victorious powers as Nazis and labeled as such, were arrested, the remaining crew was taken prisoner and led by foot to Mittelholstein under the command of the last remaining officer, the chief engineer Oberleutnant zur See (Ing.) Heinz Johann Schulz. The team had to camp in an open field for several weeks until the first were released from captivity in July 1945.

=== Service in the Soviet Navy ===
After the end of the war, the ship was awarded to the Soviet Union as spoils of war and on 5 November 1945, she was added to the inventory of the Soviet Navy. The takeover took place on 25 December 1945, the Soviet flag was hoisted for the first time on 20 January 1946, on 29 March 1946 the ship was incorporated into the Soviet Baltic Fleet and on 13 May 1946 under the name Angara (Russian: Ангара).

Initially, the ship served the port captain of Leningrad, today's Saint Petersburg. Three years later it was placed under the Black Sea Fleet and stationed in Sevastopol, Crimea. From 22 June 1957 to 13 March 1958, due to its luxurious furnishings from the Kriegsmarine, among others with very spacious wood-paneled cabins and dining rooms, it was used as the official government yacht of the Soviet Union. Many well-known personalities and high-ranking politicians were guests on the ship at the invitation of the Soviet government, including the Finnish President, the Indian Prime Minister, the King of Afghanistan, the Defense Ministers of China, Bulgaria, Hungary, Poland and Romania, and the naval chiefs of the GDR, Bulgaria, Poland and Romania. On 13 March 1958, the ship was returned to the Black Sea Navy Command. There it served as the command ship of the regional naval commander until 1992.

In 1992 the Hela was probably the last still active larger surface ship of the former German Navy, albeit under a foreign flag. The armament, such as the two 10.5 cm guns on the fore and aft deck, however, had already been removed. On 26 February 1995, a fire broke out in the engine room, which the crew could not extinguish and which caused severe damage. Since the ship was no longer maneuverable under its own power, it was reclassified as a residential ship PKZ-14 in January 1996 and then no longer used as a command ship or government yacht. In the period that followed, up to 2006, the ship was hardly serviced and rusted away.

=== Fate ===
The ship was up for sale for a rumored USD 1.2 million as early as 2000 and was offered by a British shipbroker in later years. In 2007, following the mediation of influential Russian businessmen, the Russian Navy sold it to the Italian Antonio Crispino (with Ellici Trasporti srl as a contractual partner), who wanted to convert it into a sea-going luxury yacht. The final selling price has not been published. On 29 April 2011, the planning and development work began, with which the Italian company Navirex was entrusted by Mario Grasso and the Francesco Rogantin Studio for Naval Architecture and Engineering, with Mr. Fausto Corradini as coordinating project manager. After the hull had already been derusted and re-preserved in a dry dock and propellers and shafts had been removed, the ship was towed to the pier of a shipyard in Sevastopol. There the crane was removed first and by mid-2012 all the superstructures and the funnel were also removed.

A yacht that was to be chartered out was planned with ten large cabins, the individual design of which was to be modeled on the Carlton Hotel in Cannes, and a saloon measuring 25 m × 10 m, as well as wide stairs and elevators. The ship should be diesel-electric, with a planned cruising speed of 15 knots and a maximum speed of 20 knots, which would have been the performance of the former Hela. With an economical speed of 12 knots the range should be 5,000 nautical miles. With an average of twelve passengers, the crew would have consisted of 20 people.

In the fourth quarter of 2019, the ship was scrapped at the Inkerman demolition yard.

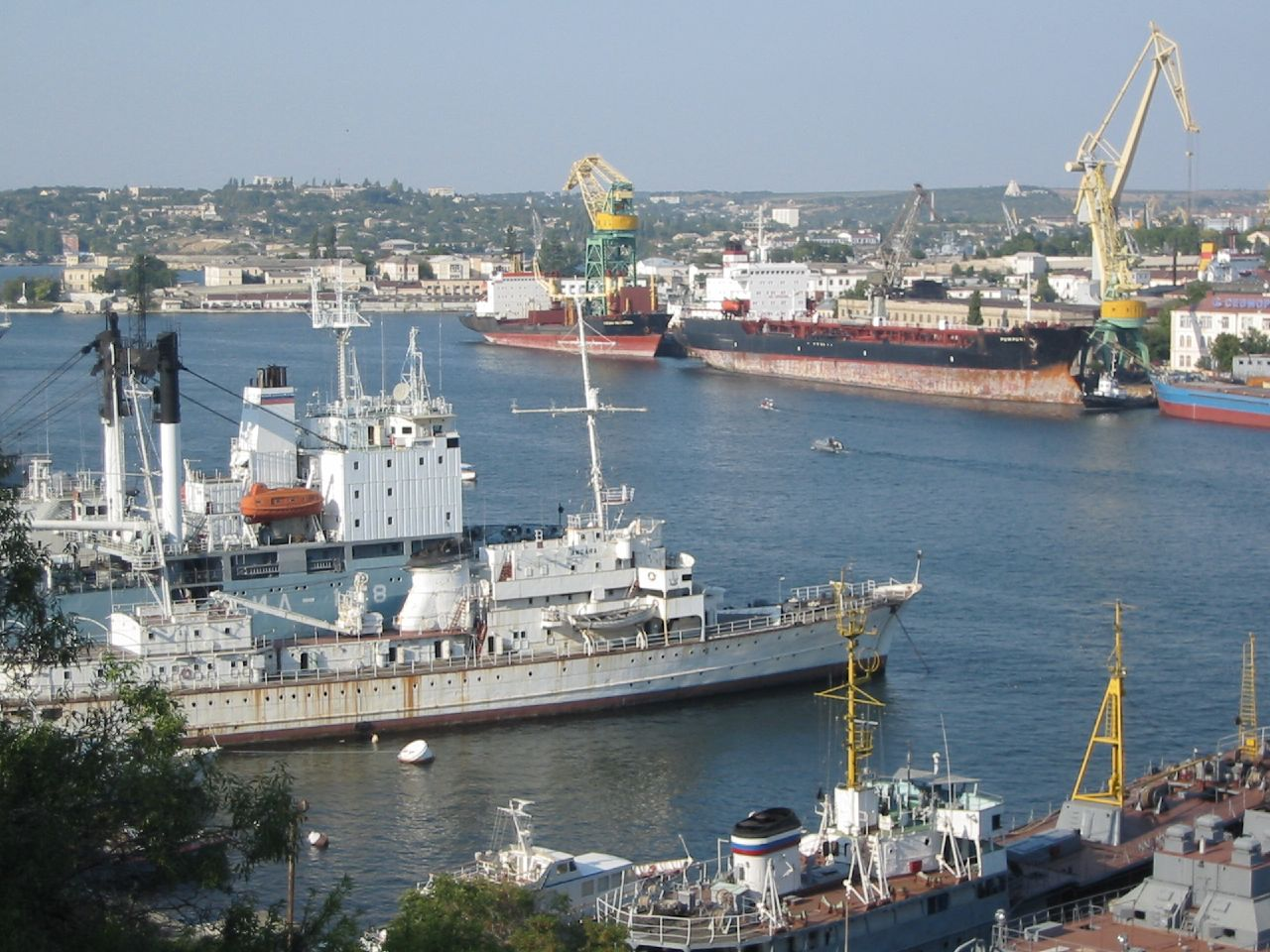
PKZ-14 on 30 August 2005

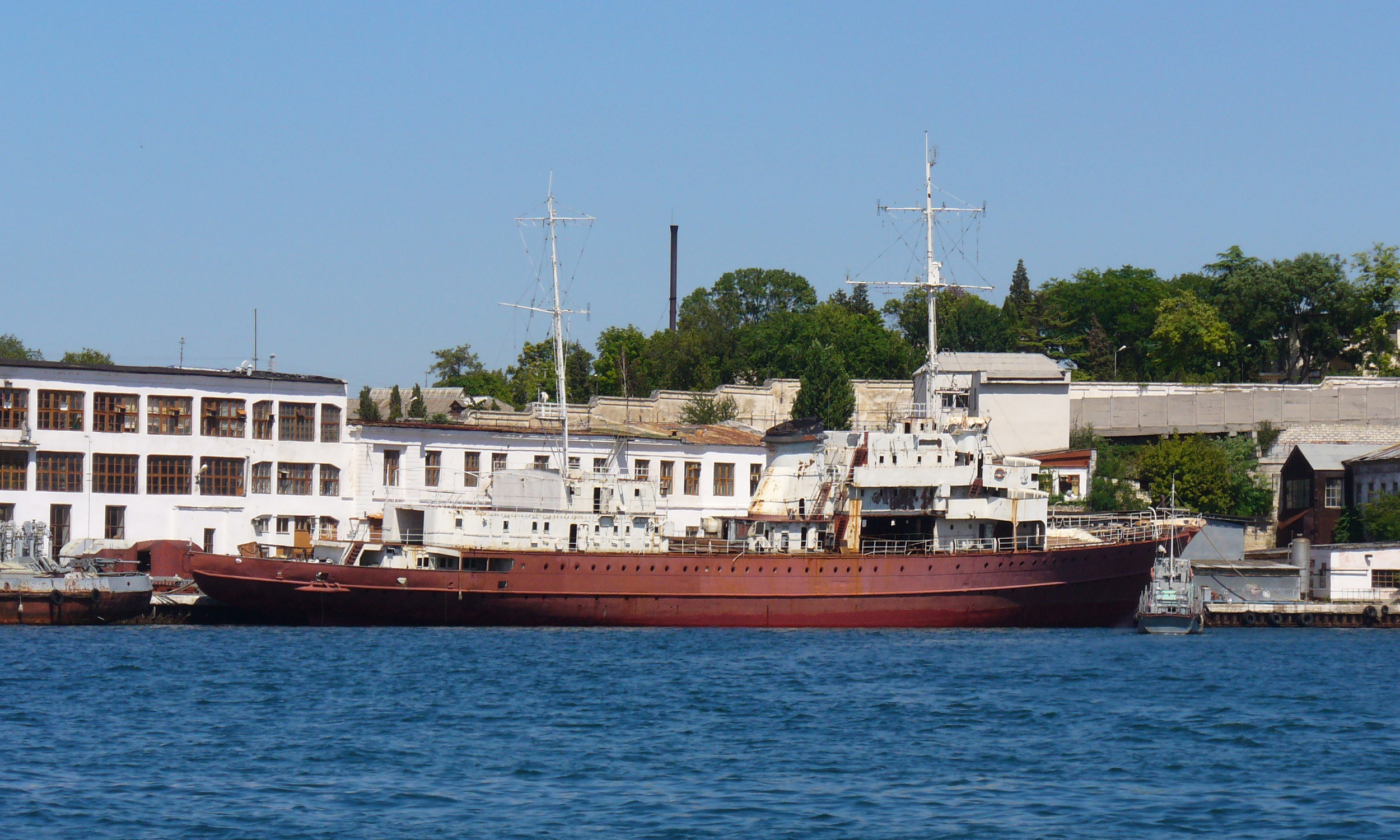
PKZ-14 on 18 July 2008
