= German training ship Hugo Zeye =

History

Nazi Germany
- Builder: AG Neptun, Rostock
- Yard number: 482
- Laid down: 1939
- Launched: 14 September 1940
- Commissioned: 19 July 1942
- Fate: Sunk 14 March 1945 after hitting a mine

General characteristics
- Tonnage: 10,750 t (10,580 long tons; 11,850 short tons)
- Length: 138 m (452 ft 9 in) waterline; 146 m (479 ft 0 in) overall
- Beam: 16 m (52 ft 6 in)
- Draft: 6.50 m (21 ft 4 in) Standard
- Propulsion: 3 × Cylinder Triple Expansion
- Speed: 16 knots
- Complement: 7-50 officers, 169-80 enlisted
- Armament: As built: 4 × 3.7 cm (1.5 in) SK C/30; 14 × 2 cm (0.79 in) FlaK 30; 2 × 53.3 cm (21.0 in) quadruple torpedo tubes

Service record
- Part of: Kriegsmarine
- Commanders: K.Kapt. Warnholtz (July 1942 - Nov 1944)

Initially built as a combined passenger and transport ship for Turkey, Hugo Zeye was taken over by Nazi Germany's Kriegsmarine at the outbreak of the war and completed as a torpedo training ship. Equipped with eight torpedo tubes, the ship was used to train torpedo personnel for surface combat ships in the Baltic Sea. The ship was named after Hugo Zeye, a vice admiral of the Imperial German Navy.

== Fate ==
In 1945, the ship was used to evacuate military personnel and civilians from East Prussia. On her last evacuation voyage, the ship hit a mine northwest of Fehmarn early on 14 March 1945 and sank in position 54°33′39″N 10°52′30″E. All but 5 people on board could be saved.
