= Schwertwal =

German small submarine designed during the 1940s decade

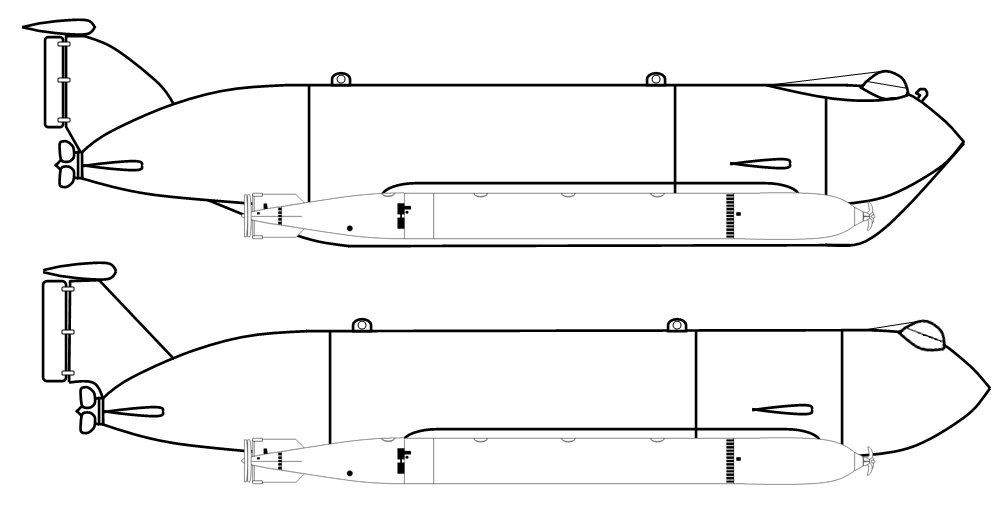
Kleinst U-Boot-Schwertwal I und II

Schwertwal (German for Orca, lit. "Sword Whale") was a German miniature submarine design that reached the trial stage in late April 1945. It had a crew of two and was designed to have a high subsurface speed of around 20 knots. The high speed was archived by the use of a Walther turbine. The submarine carried an armament of two torpedoes. The submarine lacked a periscope and the pilot viewed the outside world through an acrylic glass dome.

The prototype was scuttled at the end of World War II but was raised by the British Navy and examined before being scrapped.

== Further developments ==
Design work for an even faster version began but the plans never left the drawing board.
