= German submarine U-1102 =

German World War II submarine

- Type VIIC submarine U-570 which looked almost identical to U-1102.

History

Nazi Germany
- Name: U-1102
- Ordered: 5 June 1941
- Builder: Nordseewerke, Emden
- Yard number: 224
- Laid down: 16 April 1943
- Launched: 15 January 1944
- Commissioned: 22 February 1944
- Decommissioned: 12 May 1944
- Recommissioned: 15 August 1944
- Fate: Surrendered on 13 May 1945; Sunk on 21 December 1945 during Operation Deadlight

General characteristics
- Class & type: Type VIIC submarine
- Displacement: 864.7 t (851 long tons) submerged
- Length: 67.10 m (220 ft 2 in) o/a; 50.50 m (165 ft 8 in) pressure hull
- Beam: 6.18 m (20 ft 3 in) o/a; 4.68 m (15 ft 4 in) pressure hull
- Height: 9.60 m (31 ft 6 in)
- Draught: 4.74 m (15 ft 7 in)
- Installed power: 2,800–3,200 PS (2,100–2,400 kW; 2,800–3,200 bhp) (diesels); 750 PS (550 kW; 740 shp) (electric)
- Propulsion: 2 shafts; 2 × 4-stroke M6V 40/46 Germaniawerft; 2 x 62 batteries; 2 x six-cylinder supercharged diesel engines; 2 × electric motors
- Speed: 17.6 knots (32.6 km/h; 20.3 mph) surfaced; 7.5 knots (13.9 km/h; 8.6 mph) submerged
- Range: 8,500 nmi (15,700 km; 9,800 mi) at 10 knots (19 km/h; 12 mph) surfaced; 80 nmi (150 km; 92 mi) at 4 knots (7.4 km/h; 4.6 mph) submerged
- Test depth: 220 m (720 ft); Crush depth: 250–295 m (820–968 ft)
- Complement: 44-57 crew
- Armament: 5 × 53.3 cm (21 in) torpedo tubes (four bow, one stern); 14 × torpedoes; 1 × 8.8 cm (3.46 in) deck gun (220 rounds); 1 × 3.7 cm (1.5 in) Flak M42 AA gun; 2 × twin 2 cm (0.79 in) C/30 anti-aircraft guns

Service record
- Part of: 8th U-boat Flotilla; 22 February – 12 May 1944; U-boat Defense School; 15 August 1944 – 8 May 1945
- Identification codes: M 55 331
- Commanders: Oblt.z.S. Bernhard Schwarting; 22 February – 12 May 1944; Oblt.z.S. Erwin Sell; 15 August 1944 – 13 May 1945
- Operations: None
- Victories: None

German submarine U-1102 was a Type VIIC U-boat of Nazi Germany's Kriegsmarine during World War II.

== Construction ==
The U-1102 was laid down on 16 April 1943 at the Nordseewerke shipyard in Emden, Germany. She was launched on 15 January 1944 and commissioned on 22 February 1944 under the command of Oberleutnant zur See Bernhard Schwarting.

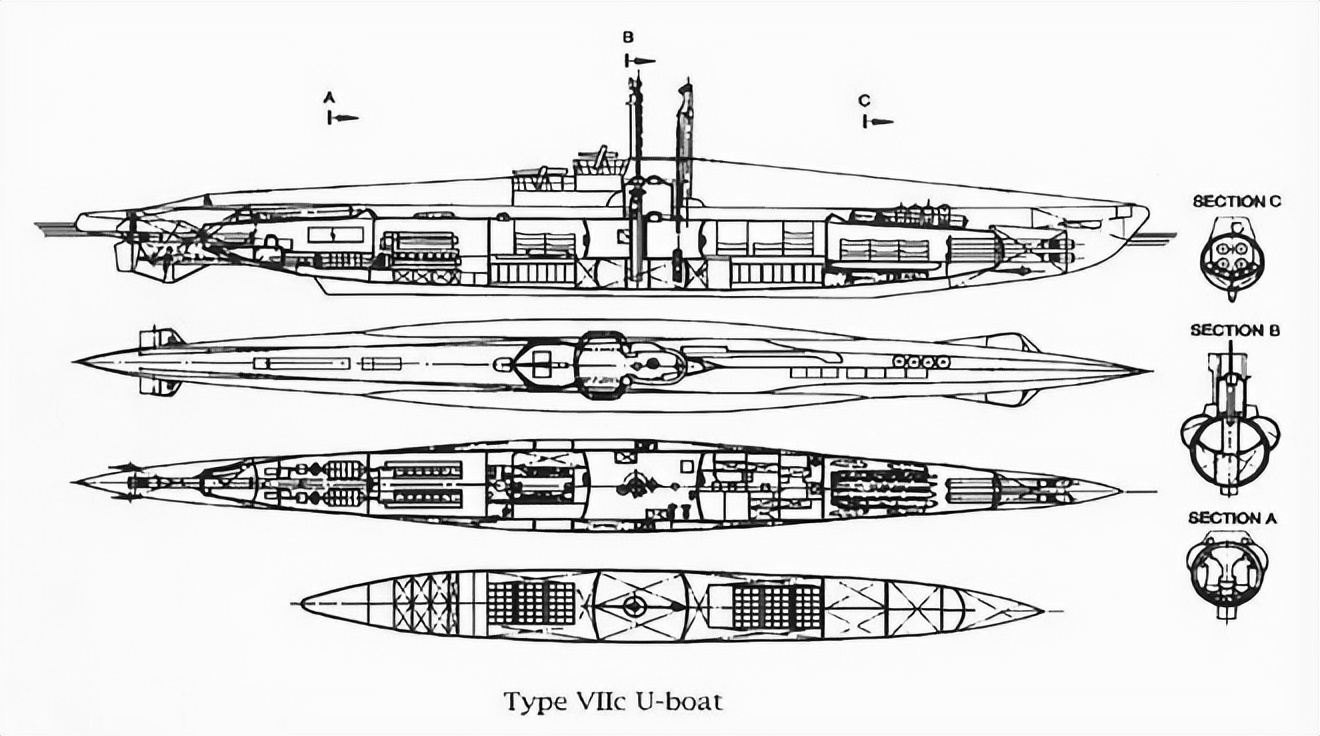
Diagram of a Type VIIC U-boat.

When she was completed, the submarine was 67.10 metres (220 ft 2 in) long, with a beam of 6.18 metres (20 ft 3 in), a height of 9.60 metres (31 ft 6 in) and a draft of 4.74 metres (15 ft 7 in). She was assessed at 864.7 t (851 long tons) submerged. The submarine was powered by two Germaniawerft F46 four-stroke, six-cylinder supercharged diesel engines producing a total of 2,800 to 3,200 metric horsepower (2,060 to 2,350 kW; 2,760 to 3,160 shp) for use while surfaced and two SSW GU 343/38-8 double-acting electric motors producing a total of 750 metric horsepower (550 kW; 740 shp) for use while submerged. She had two shafts and two 1.23 m (4 ft) propellers. The submarine was capable of operating at depths of up to 230 metres (750 ft), had a maximum surface speed of 17.6 knots (32.6 km/h; 20.3 mph) and a maximum submerged speed of 7.5 knots (13.9 km/h; 8.6 mph).When submerged, the U-boat could operate for 80 nautical miles (150 km; 92 mi) at 4 knots (7.4 km/h; 4.6 mph) and when surfaced, she could travel 8,500 nautical miles (15,700 km; 9,800 mi) at 10 knots (19 km/h; 12 mph).

The submarine was fitted with five 53.3 cm (21 in) torpedo tubes (four fitted at the bow and one at the stern), fourteen torpedoes, one 8.8 cm (3.46 in) deck gun (220 rounds), one 3.7 cm (1.5 in) Flak M42 and two twin 2 cm (0.79 in) C/30 anti-aircraft guns. The boat had a complement of 44 to 57 men.

== Service history And Accident ==
U-1102 was used as a Training ship in the 8th U-boat Flotilla from 22 February 1944 until 12 May 1944. On 24 March 1944, the U-boat sank during a diving accident at the U-boat base quay in Pillau. Two crew members were lost in the incident and U-1102 was raised and decommissioned on 12 May 1944. She was brought to Danzig for repairs and returned to service as a school boat on 15 August 1944 under the command of a new commander Oberleutnant zur See Erwin Sell. U-1102 took part in the Operation Hannibal and sailed on the 1 January 1945 from Gotenhafen to Swinemünde and finally to Kiel where she surrendered.

== Capture And End ==
U-1102 surrendered on 13 May 1945 in the Hohwacht Bay, Germany to the Allied Forces. The submarine was transferred to Wilhelmshaven via Kiel and was transferred to Loch Ryan on 23 June 1945. She stayed in Loch Ryan until her sinking in Operation Deadlight (post-war Allied operation) on 21 December 1945, when she was towed to sea by the British destroyer HMS Zetland.

U-1102 was sunk at 15:05 on 21 December 1945 in the North Atlantic, North-West off the coast of Ireland by naval gun fire from the Polish destroyer ORP Piorun, the British destroyers HMS Onslaught and HMS Zetland and the British sloop HMS Fowey.

== Wreck ==
Her wreck lies at 56°04′N 09°35′W.

== Bibliography ==
- Busch, Rainer; Röll, Hans-Joachim (1999). German U-boat commanders of World War II : a biographical dictionary. Translated by Brooks, Geoffrey. London, Annapolis, Md: Greenhill Books, Naval Institute Press. ISBN 1-55750-186-6.
- Gröner, Erich; Jung, Dieter; Maass, Martin (1991). German Warships 1815–1945, U-boats and Mine Warfare Vessels. Vol. 2. Translated by Thomas, Keith; Magowan, Rachel. London: Conway Maritime Press. ISBN 0-85177-593-4.
