= German cruiser Leipzig =

Leipzig-class light cruiser

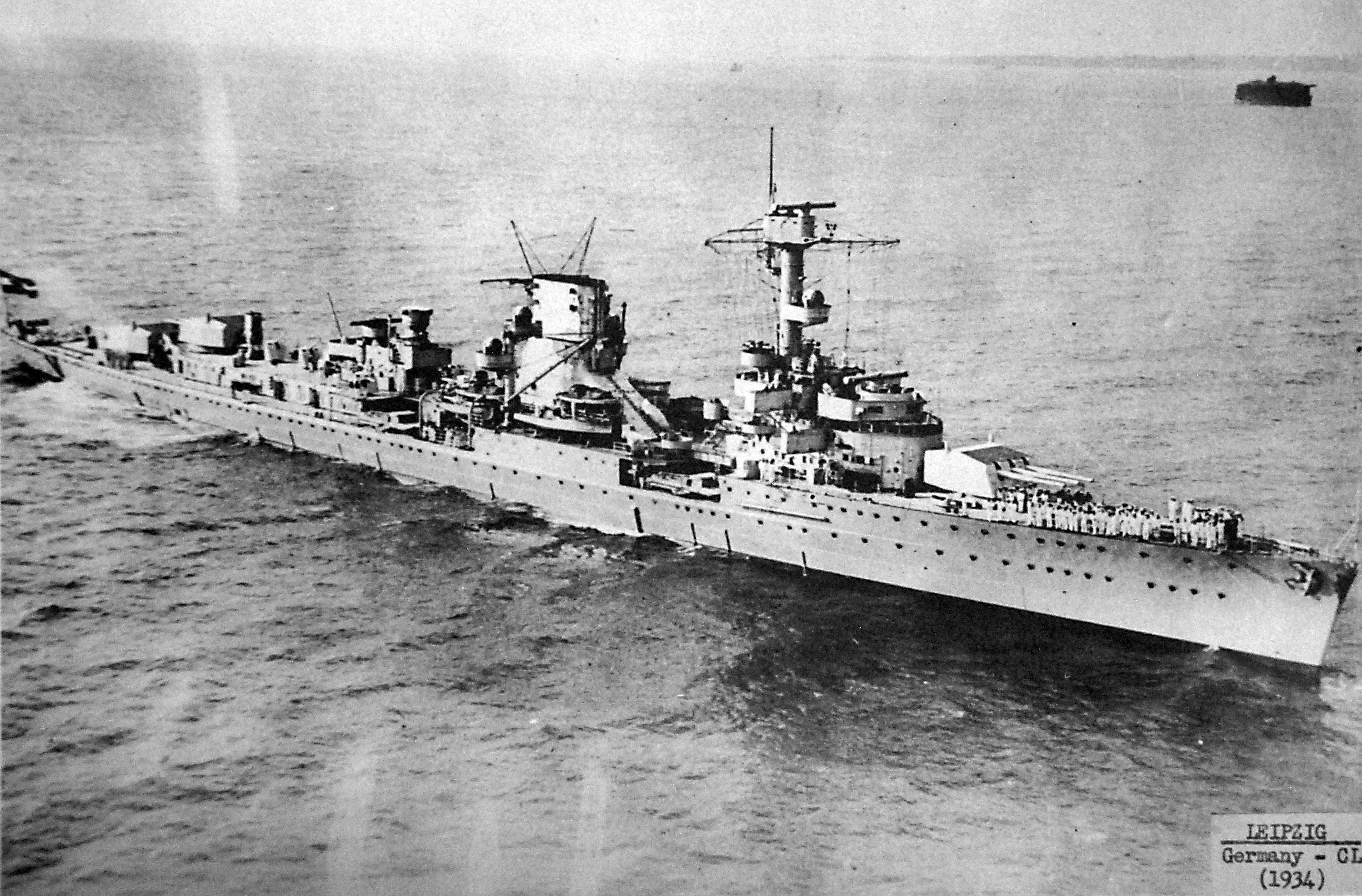
- Leipzig, circa 1934

History

Germany
- Name: Leipzig
- Namesake: Leipzig
- Laid down: 28 April 1928
- Launched: 18 October 1929
- Commissioned: 8 October 1931
- Fate: Scuttled July 1946

General characteristics
- Class & type: Leipzig-class cruiser
- Displacement: Full load: 8,100 t (8,000 long tons; 8,900 short tons)
- Length: 177 m (580 ft 9 in)
- Beam: 16.3 m (53 ft 6 in)
- Draft: 5.69 m (18 ft 8 in)
- Installed power: 6 × water-tube boilers; 60,000 PS (44,000 kW) (turbines); 12,400 PS (9,100 kW) (diesels)
- Propulsion: 2 × steam turbines; 4 × diesel engines; 3 × screw propellers
- Speed: 32 knots (59 km/h; 37 mph)
- Range: 3,900 nmi (7,200 km; 4,500 mi) at 10 knots (19 km/h; 12 mph)
- Complement: 26 officers; 508 enlisted men
- Armament: 9 × 15 cm (5.9 in) SK C/25 guns; 2 × 8.8 cm (3.5 in) SK L/45 anti-aircraft guns; 12 × 50 cm (20 in) torpedo tubes
- Armor: Belt armor: 50 mm (2 in); Deck: 30 mm (1.2 in); Conning tower: 100 mm (3.9 in)
- Aircraft carried: 2 × Arado 196 floatplanes

Leipzig was the lead ship of her class of light cruisers built by the German navy. She had one sister ship, Nürnberg. Leipzig was laid down in April 1928, was launched in October 1929, and was commissioned into the Reichsmarine in October 1931. Armed with a main battery of nine 15 cm (5.9 in) guns in three triple turrets, Leipzig had a top speed of 32 knots (59 km/h; 37 mph).

Leipzig participated in non-intervention patrols during the Spanish Civil War. In the first year of World War II, she performed escort duties for warships in the Baltic and North seas. While on one of these operations in December 1939, the ship was torpedoed by a British submarine and badly damaged. Repairs were completed by late 1940, when she returned to service as a training ship. She provided gunfire support to the advancing Wehrmacht troops as they invaded the Soviet Union in 1941.

In October 1944, Leipzig was accidentally rammed by the heavy cruiser Prinz Eugen; the damage was so severe that the navy decided complete repairs were unfeasible. The ship was patched up to keep her afloat, and she helped to defend Gotenhafen from the advancing Red Army in March 1945. She then carried a group of fleeing German civilians, reaching Denmark by late April. After the end of the war, Leipzig was used as a barracks ship for minesweeping forces and was scuttled in July 1946.

== Design ==
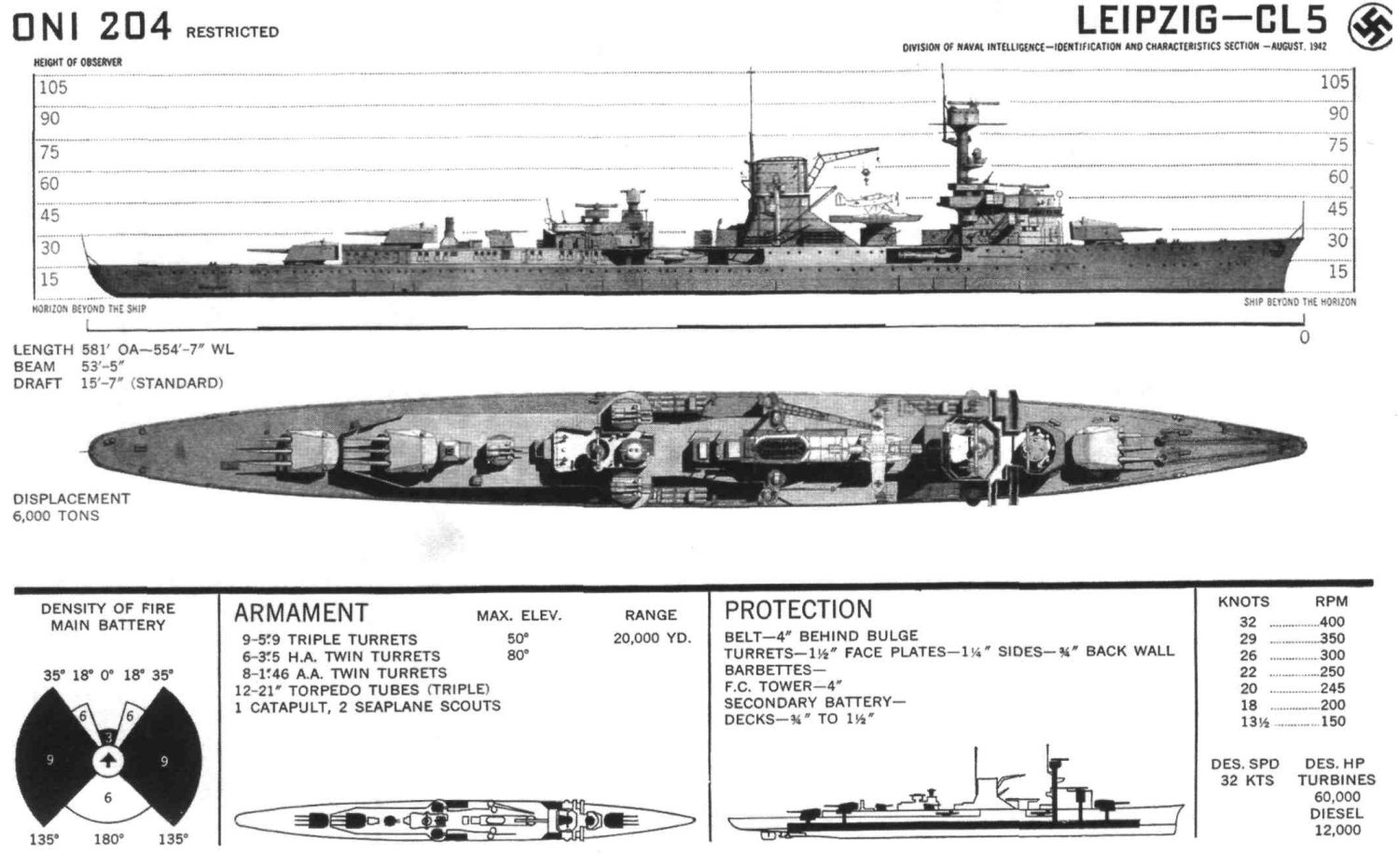
Leipzig recognition chart

Leipzig was 177 meters (581 ft) long overall and had a beam of 16.3 m (53 ft) and a maximum draft of 5.69 m (18.7 ft) forward. She displaced 8,100 metric tons (8,000 long tons; 8,900 short tons) at full load. Leipzig had a crew of 26 officers and 508 enlisted men.

Her propulsion system consisted of two steam turbines and four 7-cylinder MAN two-stroke double-acting diesel engines, which were the basis for the unsuccessful US Navy Hooven-Owens-Rentschler design. Steam for the turbines was provided by six Marine-type, double-ended, oil-fired water-tube boilers. The ship's propulsion system provided a top speed of 32 knots (59 km/h; 37 mph) and a range of approximately 3,900 nautical miles (7,200 km; 4,500 mi) at 10 knots (19 km/h; 12 mph) using only the diesel engines.

The ship was armed with a main battery of nine 15 cm (5.9 in) SK C/25 guns mounted in three triple gun turrets. One was located forward, and two were placed in a superfiring pair aft, all on the centerline. They were supplied with between 1,080 and 1,500 rounds of ammunition, for between 120 and 166 shells per gun. It had originally been intended to equip the cruiser with an anti-aircraft battery of two twin 8.8 cm (3.5 in) SK C/25 guns. But as this gun proved to be unsatisfactory during tests and its replacement the 8.8 cm SK C/31 gun was not yet ready, the ship was equipped with two obsolete 8.8 cm SK L/45 anti-aircraft guns in single mounts; they had 400 rounds of ammunition each. Leipzig also carried four triple 50 cm (20 in) torpedo tube mounts located amidships; they were supplied with twenty-four torpedoes. She was also capable of carrying 120 naval mines. The ship was protected by an armored deck that was 30 mm (1.2 in) thick amidships and an armor belt that was 50 mm (2 in) thick. The conning tower had 100 mm (3.9 in) thick sides.

== Service history ==
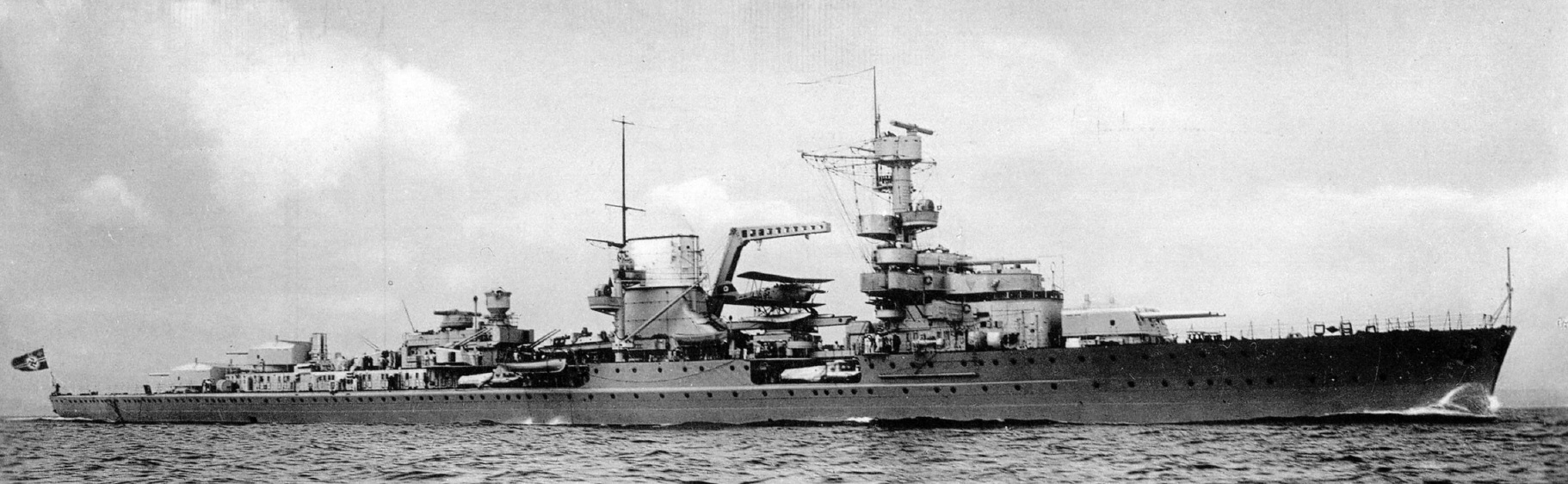
Leipzig in 1937

Leipzig was laid down at the Reichsmarinewerft shipyard in Wilhelmshaven on 28 April 1928 and launched on 18 October 1929. She was commissioned into the Reichsmarine on 8 October 1931. The ship trained extensively in the Baltic Sea throughout 1932 and 1933, and also made several goodwill cruises overseas. In 1934, she and the cruiser Königsberg made the first goodwill visit to the United Kingdom since the end of World War I. In late 1934, Leipzig went into drydock for modifications. An aircraft catapult was installed on the aft superstructure and a crane for handling float planes replaced one of her boat derricks. The 50 cm torpedo tubes were replaced with 53.3 cm (21.0 in) ones. On the aft superstructure a SL-1 stabilized director post for the anti-aircraft guns was installed, and two more single-mount 8.8 cm anti-aircraft guns were added. Leipzig was the first ship of the Kriegsmarine to receive anti-aircraft fire control. These modifications were made in Kiel. In early 1935, Leipzig joined the old pre-dreadnought battleship Schlesien, the new heavy cruiser Deutschland, and the light cruiser Köln for major fleet exercises.

Later in 1935, Adolf Hitler visited the ship during training maneuvers with the rest of the fleet. The ship joined her sister Nürnberg and Köln for exercises in the Atlantic Ocean in early 1936. In February 1936 the obsolete single mount anti-aircraft guns were finally replaced by three twin 8.8 cm SK C/32 naval guns. In August, Leipzig took part in the non-intervention patrols off Spain during the Spanish Civil War. She conducted several patrols between August 1936 and June 1937, and in late June, she was allegedly attacked with torpedoes; this prompted Germany and Italy to withdraw from the non-intervention patrols. She thereafter returned to Germany and went into the Baltic Sea for training, which lasted through 1938. In March 1939, she participated in the annexation of Memel which Germany had demanded from Lithuania. The following month, she joined the battleship Gneisenau, the cruiser Deutschland, and several destroyers and U-boats for major exercises in the Atlantic. Additional maneuvers were conducted through the middle of 1939.

=== World War II ===
==== 1939–1940 ====
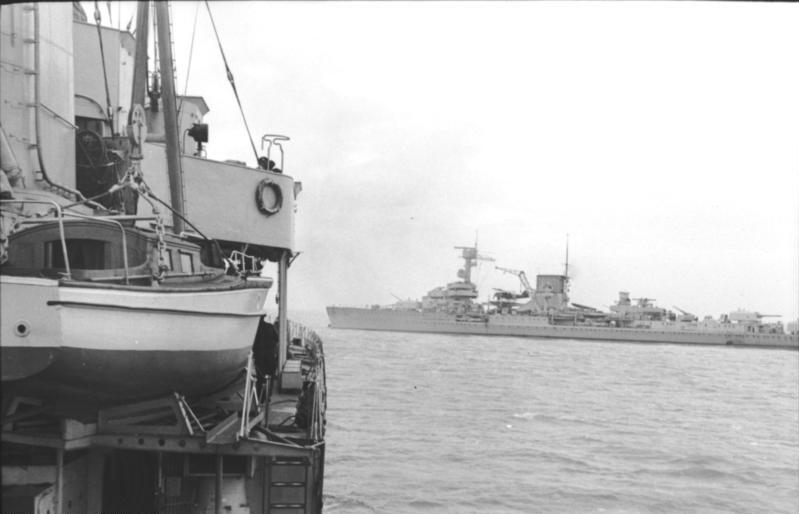
Leipzig in the Kaiser Wilhelm Canal in 1939

At the outbreak of World War II in September 1939, Leipzig was assigned to the blocking force that was intended to prevent the escape of the Polish Navy from the Baltic; they were unsuccessful. Leipzig thereafter went to the North Sea, where she and the other light cruisers laid a series of defensive minefields. This task lasted through the end of the month, after which she returned to the Baltic for training maneuvers. On 17–19 November, Leipzig covered a minelaying operation in the North Sea. She joined Deutschland, Köln, and three torpedo boats for a sweep in the Skagerrak for Allied shipping on 21–22 November. Leipzig was tasked with escorting the battleships Scharnhorst and Gneisenau through the Skagerrak, and with covering their return on the 27th.

On 13 December, Leipzig was tasked with escorting a flotilla of destroyers and other small vessels returning from a mine-laying operation off the British coast. The Royal Navy submarine HMS Salmon launched a spread of torpedoes at the German warships, and at 11:25 hit Leipzig with a torpedo. The torpedo hit Leipzig just below the waterline, where a bulkhead separated two of the ship's three boiler rooms. The explosion bent her armoured deck and damaged her keel; some 1,700 t (1,700 long tons; 1,900 short tons) of water flooded the ship, and the damage cut electrical power to the ship's pumping system. The two boiler rooms were flooded, steam lines were damaged, and the port turbine was shut down. At the same time, her sister Nürnberg was also torpedoed. A pair of destroyers arrived to escort the damaged cruisers back to port; an hour after Leipzig was torpedoed, one of the escorting destroyers was also torpedoed, just outside the mouth of the Elbe. Another torpedo passed just ahead of Leipzig, nearly hitting the damaged cruiser.

While en route back to Germany on 14 December, Nürnberg and Leipzig came under attack from the British Royal Air Force (RAF). Twelve Vickers Wellington bombers from No. 99 Squadron RAF located the two cruisers but were unable to release their bombs due to the low cloud. The RAF bombers were intercepted in the vicinity of Spiekeroog and Wangerooge by fighters from II. Gruppe (2nd group) of Jagdgeschwader 77 (JG 77—77th Fighter Wing) under the leadership of Oberstleutnant Carl-Alfred Schumacher. There was no further damage to the cruisers, and JG 77 pilots claimed seven and one probable bomber shot down, including one claimed by Unteroffizier Herbert Kutscha. RAF records indicate that six bombers were lost as a result of the attack. After safely returning to port in Kiel, Leipzig was taken into the Deutsche Werke shipyard for repairs. She was decommissioned while under repair and reclassified as a training ship. To accommodate additional training crews, four of the ship's boilers were removed. She returned to service in late 1940.

==== 1941–1946 ====
In March 1941 the two aft triple torpedo tubes were removed and installed on Gneisenau. The aircraft catapult was also removed though the aircraft crane was kept onboard. In early June, she escorted the heavy cruiser Lützow (formerly Deutschland) to Norway. After she returned to the Baltic, she and the cruiser Emden provided artillery support to advancing German ground forces during Operation Barbarossa, the invasion of the Soviet Union. In September, she supported the invasion of the Baltic islands in the West Estonian archipelago. While bombarding Soviet positions on Moon Island, Leipzig was attacked unsuccessfully by the Soviet submarine Shch-317. In late September, the ship joined the German Baltic Fleet, centered on the battleship Tirpitz; the fleet was tasked with blocking a possible Soviet attempt to break out of the Baltic. Leipzig returned to Kiel in October, and conducted maneuvers with the heavy cruiser Admiral Scheer. Leipzig became the flagship of the training fleet in 1942; she spent the year performing training duties.

Leipzig was decommissioned briefly in March 1943, and recommissioned on 1 August. She was in need of an overhaul, however, and the work significantly delayed her return to operational status. Furthermore, an outbreak of meningitis killed two crewmen and created an additional delay. Leipzig returned to escort duties in the Baltic in mid-September 1944. Her first operation covered troop transports between Gotenhafen and Swinemünde in company with Admiral Scheer. On 14 October, Leipzig departed Gotenhafen, bound for Swinemünde, to take on a load of mines. In a heavy fog, she was involved in a collision with the heavy cruiser Prinz Eugen, which was steaming at 20 knots (37 km/h; 23 mph). At the time of collision, Leipzig was switching from her diesel cruise engines to her steam turbine main engines, a process of first uncoupling the diesels from the shafts and then coupling turbines to the shafts, which left the ship temporarily without propulsion, drifting out of her fairway into the path of Prinz Eugen which was moving the opposite direction. Prinz Eugen struck Leipzig on her port side, just forward of her funnel, cutting her nearly in half - the forward point of the clipper bow of Prinz Eugen actually stuck out beyond the starboard side of Leipzig. The collision destroyed the number 3 (port) engine room, flooded a second engine room and killed or wounded 39 crewmen. The ships remained stuck fast for over a day, after which Leipzig was towed back to Gotenhafen. The damage was so severe that repairs were deemed impractical, especially considering Germany's pressing military situation by late 1944. Only repairs to keep her afloat in the harbor were effected.

Leipzig provided fire support to the defending German forces in March 1945, while Soviet Red Army forces advanced on the city. On 24 March, Leipzig was moved to Hela, laden with refugees; she was capable of steaming at only 6 knots (11 km/h; 6.9 mph). She was repeatedly attacked by Soviet aircraft, and Allied submarines attempted to torpedo her twice. She nevertheless safely reached Denmark on 29 April. Due to her poor state following the end of the war, she was used as a barracks ship for the men of the German Mine Sweeping Administration, tasked with clearing mines off the German coast. The battered ship was eventually towed out and scuttled in July 1946.
