= German cruiser Köln =

Königsberg-class cruiser

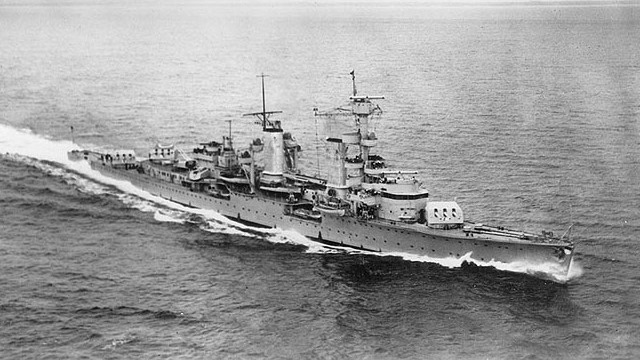

History

Germany
- Name: Köln
- Builder: Reichsmarinewerft Wilhelmshaven
- Launched: 23 May 1928
- Commissioned: 15 January 1930
- Fate: Sunk by American aircraft on 30 March 1945

General characteristics (Note: These statistics are for the ship as completed; over the course of her career, armament, crew size, and other characteristics of the ship changed.)
- Class & type: Königsberg-class light cruiser
- Displacement: 7,700 long tons (7,800 t)
- Length: 174 m (570 ft 10 in)
- Beam: 15.3 m (50 ft 2 in)
- Draft: 6.28 m (20 ft 7 in)
- Installed power: 6 × water-tube boilers; 65,000 shaft horsepower (48,000 kW)
- Propulsion: 2 × MAN 10-cylinder diesel engines; 4 × geared steam turbines; 2 screw propellers
- Speed: 32 knots (59 km/h; 37 mph)
- Range: 5,700 nmi (10,600 km; 6,600 mi) at 19 knots (35 km/h; 22 mph)
- Complement: 21 officers; 493 enlisted men
- Armament: 9 × 15 cm (5.9 in) SL C/25 guns; 2 × 8.8 cm (3.5 in) SK L/45 anti-aircraft guns; 12 × 50 cm (20 in) torpedo tubes; 120 mines
- Armor: Belt: 50 mm (2 in); Deck: 40 mm (1.6 in); Conning tower: 100 mm (3.9 in)

Köln was a light cruiser, the third member of the Königsberg class that was operated between 1929 and March 1945, including service in World War II. She was operated by two German navies, the Reichsmarine and the Kriegsmarine. She had two sister ships, Königsberg and Karlsruhe. Köln was built by the Reichsmarinewerft in Wilhelmshaven; she was laid down in August 1926, launched in May 1928, and commissioned into the Reichsmarine on 15 January 1930. She was armed with a main battery of nine 15 cm SK C/25 (5.9-inch) guns in three triple turrets and had a top speed of 32 knots (59 km/h; 37 mph).

Like her sister ships, Köln served as a training ship for naval cadets in the 1930s, and joined the non-intervention patrols during the Spanish Civil War during the latter part of the decade. After the outbreak of World War II in September 1939, she conducted several operations in the North Sea, but did not encounter any British warships. She participated in the attack on Bergen during Operation Weserübung in April 1940, and she was the only member of her class to survive the operation. In 1942, she was modified to carry a Flettner Fl 282 helicopter experimentally. Later in 1942, she returned to Norway, but did not see significant action. She remained there until early 1943, when she returned to Germany in order to be decommissioned as decreed by Hitler after the failure of the Kriegsmarine in Operation Regenbogen; Köln returned to service in 1944, escorting Germans ships to Norway and laying mines. In March 1945, she was sunk by American bombers in Wilhelmshaven. She remained on an even keel, with her gun turrets above water; this allowed her to provide gunfire support to defenders of the city until the end of the war in May 1945.

== Design ==
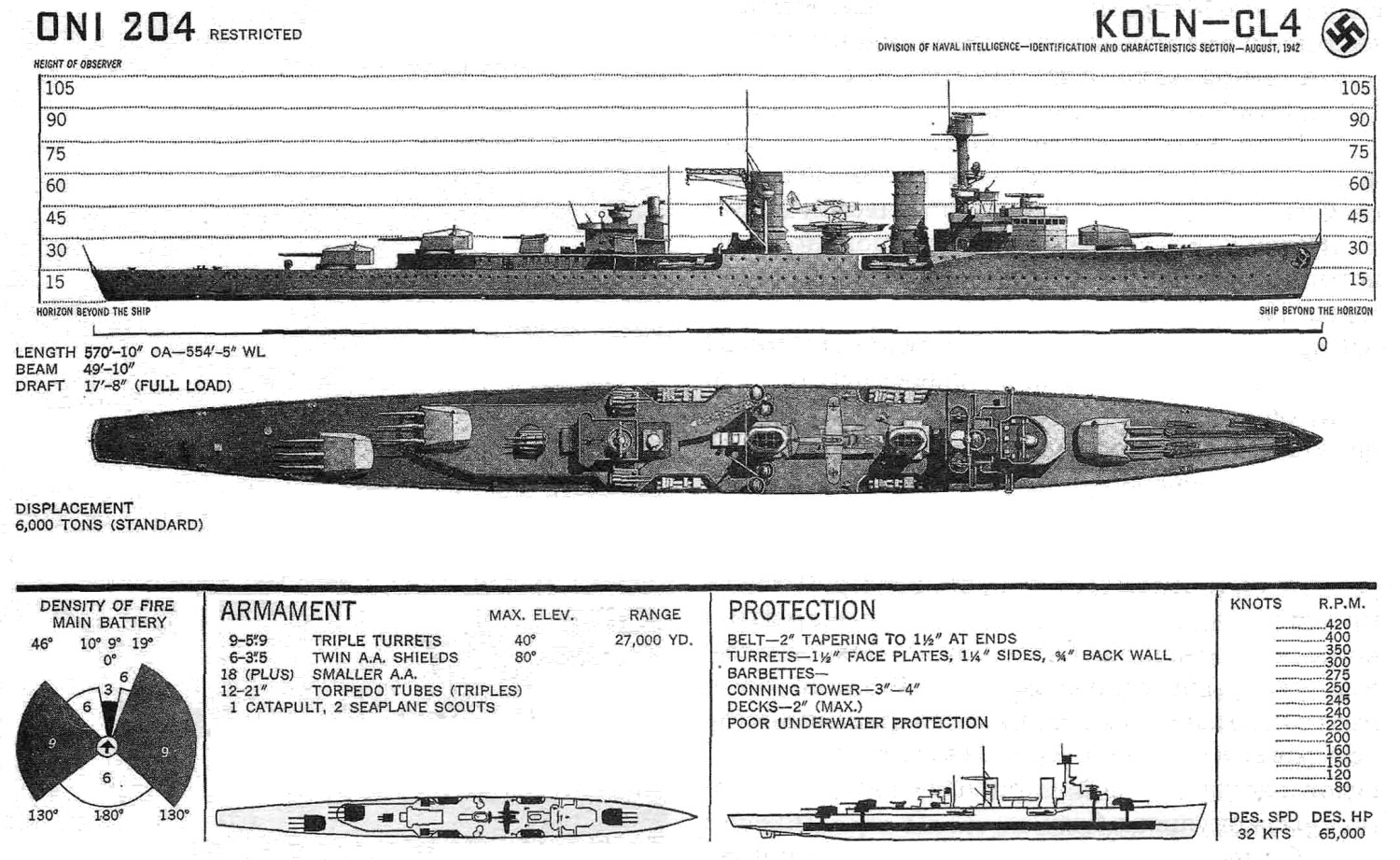
Identification drawing of Köln

Köln was 174 meters (571 ft) long overall and had a beam of 15.2 m (50 ft) and a maximum draft of 6.28 m (20.6 ft). She displaced 7,700 long tons (7,800 t) at full load. The ship had a forecastle deck that extended for most of the length of the ship, ending just aft of the superfiring rear turret. Her superstructure consisted of a conning tower forward with a heavy, tubular mast and a secondary conning tower further aft. Köln had a crew of 21 officers and 493 enlisted men.

Her propulsion system consisted of four steam turbines and a pair of 10-cylinder four-stroke diesel engines. Steam for the turbines was provided by six Marine-type, double-ended, oil-fired water-tube boilers, which were vented through a pair of funnels. The ship's propulsion system provided a top speed of 32 knots (59 km/h; 37 mph) and a range of approximately 5,700 nautical miles (10,600 km; 6,600 mi) at 19 knots (35 km/h; 22 mph).

The ship was armed with a main battery of nine 15 cm (5.9 in) SK C/25 guns mounted in three triple gun turrets. One was located forward, and two were placed in a superfiring pair aft. The rear gun turrets were offset to increase their arc of fire. They were supplied with 1,080 rounds of ammunition, for 120 shells per gun. The ship was also equipped with two 8.8 cm (3.5 in) SK L/45 anti-aircraft guns in single mounts; they had 400 rounds of ammunition each. Köln also carried four triple torpedo tube mounts located amidships; they were supplied with twenty-four 50 cm (20 in) torpedoes. She was also capable of carrying 120 naval mines. The ship was protected by an armor deck that was 40 mm (1.6 in) thick amidships and an armor belt that was 50 mm (2 in) thick. The conning tower had 100 mm (3.9 in) thick sides.

== Service history ==
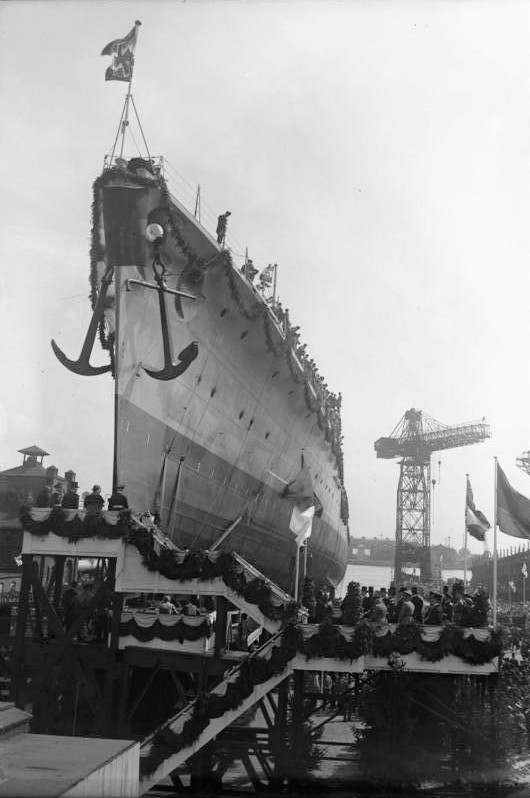
Köln at her launching on 23 May 1928

Köln was ordered as "Cruiser D" under the contract name Ersatz Arcona, as a replacement for the old cruiser Arcona. The keel for Köln was laid on 7 August 1926 at the Reichsmarinewerft shipyard in Wilhelmshaven. She was launched on 23 May 1928, and commissioned into the Reichsmarine on 15 January 1930, the last member of her class to be completed. She spent the year conducting sea trials and training in the Baltic Sea. In 1930, she was modified with two dual 8.8 cm SK C/25 anti-aircraft guns to replace the original single mounts, the rear superstructure was enlarged, and a fire control system for the anti-aircraft guns was installed aft. These new guns were unsatisfactoy and were replaced with three pairs of 8.8 cm SK C/32 in 1931. One SL-1 stabilized anti-aircraft fire control director was also installed. Köln departed on a cruise into the Atlantic in early 1932 for more extensive sea trials. After returning to Germany, she took on her first crew of naval cadets for a world cruise, departing Germany in late 1932. The tour lasted a full year; she stopped in ports across the globe, including in the Atlantic, Pacific, and Indian Oceans, and the Mediterranean Sea. In Australia the tour stops included Adelaide, Melbourne, Sydney and Hobart, with the crew taking part in several publicized football games against local teams that included a Royal Australian Navy team in Sydney.

In 1935, the ship had an aircraft catapult installed, along with cranes to handle float planes. A pole mast was also installed on the rear side of the aft funnel. Köln continued to serve as a training ship until early 1936, when she was transferred to fishery protection duty. Later that year, she joined the non-intervention patrols off Spain during the Spanish Civil War. After the German heavy cruiser Deutschland was attacked by Republican bombers in the so-called "Deutschland incident", Köln transported wounded crew members from Deutschland back to Germany. Köln conducted a further four patrols off Spain before returning to fishery protection in the North Sea in 1938. Late in the year, she went into drydock for a refit in Kiel.

In March 1939, Köln sailed to Memel (now Klaipėda, Lithuania), in connection with the annexation of the Memelland district, which Germany had demanded be returned by Lithuania. Later in the year, she joined the battleship Gneisenau and the heavy cruisers Deutschland, Admiral Scheer, and Admiral Graf Spee for a major series of maneuvers in the Atlantic.

=== World War II ===
==== 1939–1941 ====
In the final days of August 1939, Köln was stationed in the western Baltic to prevent Polish vessels from fleeing after the planned German invasion of Poland on 1 September; she was unsuccessful in this task. Between 3 and 20 September she participated in laying the 'Westwall' defensive minefield in the German North Sea. Köln joined Gneisenau and nine destroyers for a sortie through the Kattegat and Skagerrak towards the Norwegian coast on 7 October. The goal was to feint a breakout into the Atlantic which would keep pressure on the British to continue convoying, and to relieve pressure from the raiding operation of the Admiral Graf Spee. The goal was also to draw the Home Fleet out of Scapa Flow and lure them into range of the Luftwaffe. The German force was found by British air reconnaissance on 8 October at the Norwegian south coast and promptly returned home, arriving on 10 October in Kiel. The Home fleet left Scapa Flow to intercept the German Force but did not find anything. A total of 148 German aircraft are deployed to attack the Home Fleet but they achieved nothing. The British launched an air attack consisting of 12 Wellington bombers, though it too failed to hit any of the German warships. The Home Fleet did not return to Scapa Flow so when U-47 penetrated the harbor defenses of Scapa Flow on 14 October to attack the Home Fleet, it found only the old battleship HMS Royal Oak lying at anchor.

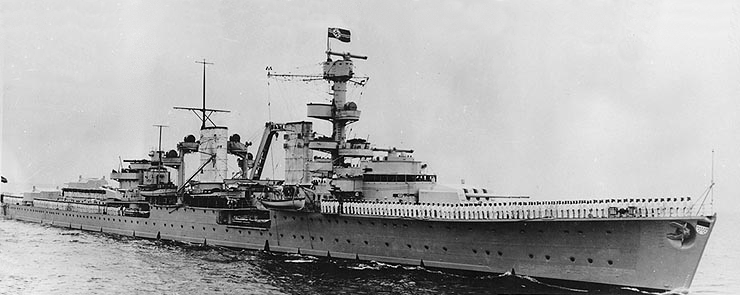
Köln circa 1936

On 20–22 November, Köln and the cruiser Leipzig escorted the battleships Gneisenau and Scharnhorst on the first leg of their sortie into the North Atlantic. On the 22nd, Köln and Leipzig were detached to join an unsuccessful patrol for Allied merchant ships in the Skagerrak along with Deutschland and three torpedo boats. The patrol lasted until 25 November, and failed to locate any Allied freighters. On 13 December, Köln, Leipzig, and Nürnberg sortied into the North Sea under the command of vice-admiral Günther Lütjens in order to meet five destroyers returning from an minelaying operation off Newcastle and escort them home. The force was attacked at 10h45 by the British submarine HMS Salmon which scored a hit on both Leipzig and Nürnberg, and then the roles were reversed when the five destroyers had to escort the cruisers back to Germany.

Köln took part in Operation Weserübung, the invasion of Norway, in April 1940. She was assigned Group 3, tasked with the assault on Bergen, along with her sister Königsberg. She reached the harbor unscathed, but Königsberg was not so lucky; she was badly damaged by Norwegian coastal guns. Köln nevertheless supported the German infantry ashore with her main guns. After the port was secured, she returned to Germany, along with a pair of destroyers. In late 1940, she went into drydock for further modifications. A degaussing coil was installed, along with a helicopter landing platform on top of turret "Bruno". She thereafter served as a testbed for the Flettner Fl 282 helicopter, a task she performed until 1942.

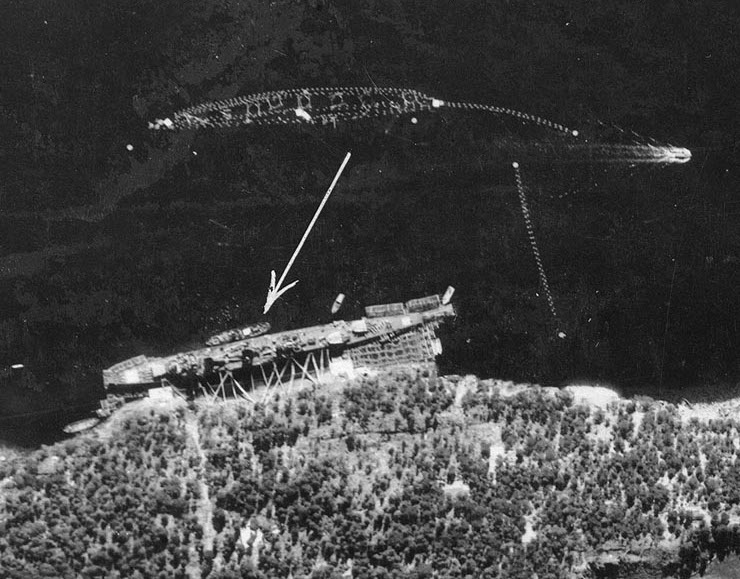
The camouflaged Köln moored in Trondheim on 19 July 1942

While still conducting experiments with the FI 282 in September 1941, Köln became part of the Baltic fleet. which was assigned to guard the Baltic sea against a possible breakout of the Soviet fleet. On 23 September she left Swinemunde together with the battleship Tirpitz, the cruisers Admiral Scheer and Nürnberg, three destroyers and five torpedo boats. The fleet patrolled in the Sea of Åland and after the Soviet fleet was neutralized by the Luftwaffe in harbor, all ships returned to Gotenhafen by 29 September. As part of Operation Beowulf, Köln participated in a diversionary attack on the east coast of the Baltic island Dagö in the Gulf of Riga during the night of 12 October, so that German forces could land against a weakened defense on the south coast. On 13 October, the Soviet submarine Shch-322 tried to attack Köln, but the cruiser's escorts forced the Soviet submarine to break off the attack. The next day, Köln provided gunfire support to ground troops attacking Soviet positions on Ristna. Toward the end of 1941, she was transferred to the North Sea, and went into drydock for her last major modification. This consisted of the installation of a FuMO 21 radar set on the forward command center roof.

==== 1942–1945 ====
On 9 July 1942, Köln and the destroyer Z16 Friedrich Eckoldt departed Kiel to join the growing naval presence in Norway. On their way to Kristiansand the ships laid a defensive minefield in the Skagerrak. Between 14 and 15 July Köln and the destroyers Friedrich Eckoldt, Z14 Friedrich Ihn and Z24 repeated the minelaying operation. On 17 July Köln and Friedrich Eckoldt arrived in Trondheim.

On 13 September, she and the heavy cruisers Admiral Scheer and Admiral Hipper and two destroyers moved from Narvik to Altafjord in preparation of Operation Doppelschlag, an attack on the Arctic Convoy PQ 18. While en route, the flotilla was attacked by the British submarine HMS Tigris, but the torpedoes passed behind the German ships. PQ-18 had an escort including an escort carrier, and ever since the near-torpedoing by aircraft of the British carrier HMS Victorious of the flagship of the German fleet, the battleship Tirpitz, Hitler was reluctant to risk his capital ships in an attack on a convoy and insisted the aircraft carrier be first disabled by the Luftwaffe before the ships could mount an action. As a consequence permission was not given for the flotilla to proceed with the operation, instead PQ-18 was attacked by U-boats and bombers, which sank thirteen freighters.

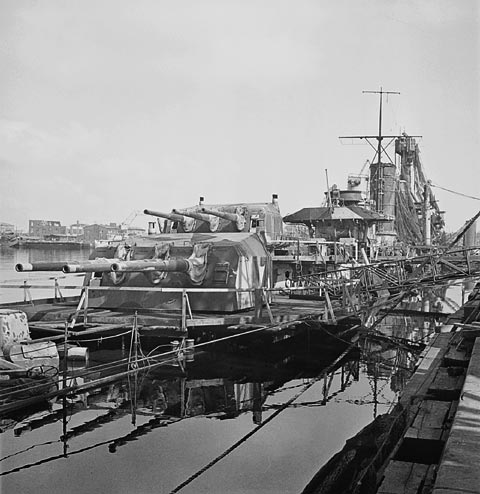
Köln sunk in Wilhelmshaven at the end of the war

The next Arctic convoy JW 51B did not sail until end of December. As in the Arctic winter and darkness carrier escort was impossible, the Kriegsmarine was determined to attack the convoy in Operation Regenbogen, resulting in the Battle of the Barents Sea. The two available light cruisers Köln and Nürnberg did not participate in the battle as they were not considered full battle worthy. The German Navy failed to destroy JW-51B and was repulsed by the inferior British convoy escort. In the aftermath of that failed operation, a furious Hitler proclaimed that the Kriegsmarine's capital ships would be paid off and dismantled, and their guns used to reinforce the fortifications of the Atlantic Wall. Admiral Karl Dönitz persuaded Hitler to retain a battle group consisting of the battleships Tirpitz and Scharnhorst, and the heavy cruiser Lützow. But the light cruisers Köln and Leipzig and the damaged Admiral Hipper were to be decommissioned and the other cruisers were relocated to the training squadron.

Köln left Altafjord on 23 January 1943 in company with Admiral Hipper and the destroyer Z4 Richard Beitzen to return to Germany. The three ships stopped in Narvik on 25 January, and in Trondheim from 30 January to 2 February. After resuming the voyage south, the ships searched for Norwegian blockade runners in the Skagerrak on 6 February before putting into port at Kiel on 8 February. Köln was decommissioned in Kiel on 17 February. She was sent to drydock in early 1944 for an overhaul to prepare her to return to combat duty; this was completed by 1 July. The cruiser served briefly as a training ship before escorting German merchant vessels in Norway.

On the night of 13–14 December, Köln was attacked by British bombers in Oslofjord; several near misses caused damage to her propulsion system that required repair in Germany. She then proceeded to Wilhelmshaven, where she was again attacked by Allied bombers repeatedly. On 30 March, B-24 Liberators from the Eighth Air Force attacked the harbor; Köln was hit and sank on an even keel. Since her guns remained above water, the ship was used as an artillery battery to defend the city from advancing Allied forces. She served in this capacity until the end of the war in May. She was partially dismantled in situ after the end of the war, and finally raised in 1956 for scrapping.
