= German cruiser Karlsruhe =

Königsberg-class cruiser

Coordinates: 58°04′N 8°04′E

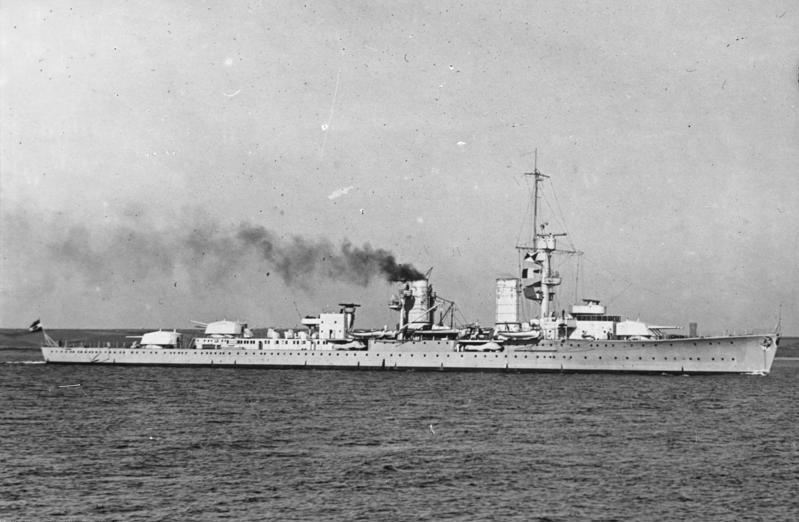
- Karlsruhe at sea in 1931

History

Germany
- Name: Karlsruhe
- Namesake: Karlsruhe, Germany
- Builder: Deutsche Werke, Kiel
- Laid down: 27 July 1926
- Launched: 20 August 1927
- Commissioned: 6 November 1929
- Fate: Sunk, 9 April 1940

General characteristics (Note: These statistics are for the ship as completed; over the course of her career, armament, crew size, and other characteristics of the ship changed.)
- Class & type: Königsberg-class light cruiser
- Displacement: 7,700 long tons (7,800 t)
- Length: 174 m (570 ft 10 in)
- Beam: 15.3 m (50 ft 2 in)
- Draft: 6.28 m (20 ft 7 in)
- Installed power: 6 × water-tube boilers; 65,000 shaft horsepower (48,000 kW)
- Propulsion: 2 × MAN 10-cylinder diesel engines; 4 × geared steam turbines; 2 screw propellers
- Speed: 32 knots (59 km/h; 37 mph)
- Range: 5,700 nmi (10,600 km; 6,600 mi) at 19 knots (35 km/h; 22 mph)
- Complement: 21 officers; 493 enlisted men
- Armament: 9 × 15 cm (5.9 in) SL C/25 guns; 2 × 8.8 cm (3.5 in) SK L/45 anti-aircraft guns; 12 × 50 cm (20 in) torpedo tubes; 120 mines
- Armor: Belt: 50 mm (2 in); Deck: 40 mm (1.6 in); Conning tower: 100 mm (3.9 in)

Karlsruhe was a light cruiser, the second member of the Königsberg class, and served from November 1929 to May 1938, and again from November 1939 to April 1940, seeing action in World War II. She was operated by two German navies, the Reichsmarine and the Kriegsmarine. She had two sister ships, Königsberg and Köln. Karlsruhe was laid down in July 1926 at the Deutsche Werke shipyard in Kiel, launched in August 1927, and commissioned into the Reichsmarine in November 1929. She was armed with a main battery of nine 15 cm SK C/25 guns in three triple turrets and had a top speed of 32 knots (59 km/h; 37 mph).

Like her sisters, Karlsruhe served as a training cruiser for naval cadets throughout the 1930s. During the Spanish Civil War, she joined the non-intervention patrols off the Spanish coast. She was in the process of being modernized at the outbreak of World War II in September 1939, and was therefore not ready for action until November 1939. In April 1940 Karlsruhe participated in Operation Weserübung, the invasion of Norway. She landed troops at Kristiansand, but while returning to Germany on 9 April, she was struck by a torpedo from the Royal Navy submarine HMS Truant and severely damaged. Unable to return to port, Karlsruhe was scuttled by an escorting German torpedo boat. Her wreck was discovered in June 2020.

== Design ==
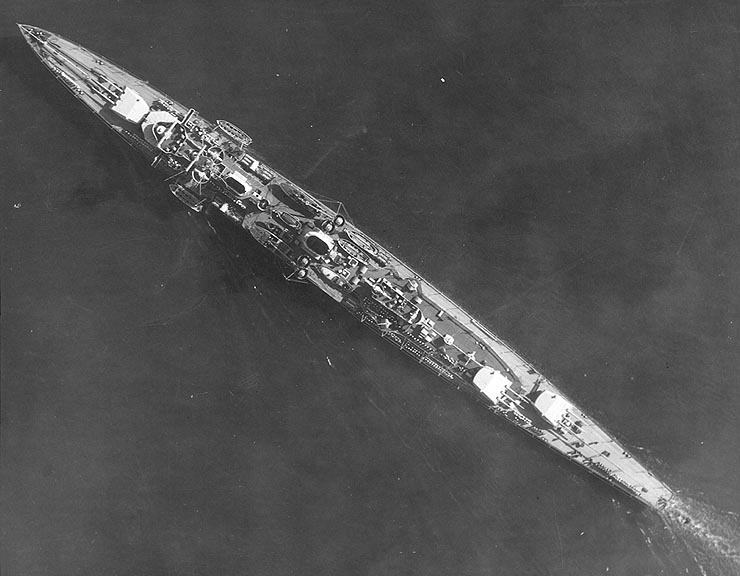
Overhead photo of Karlsruhe showing the offset arrangement of the rear main guns

Karlsruhe was 174 meters (571 ft) long overall and had a beam of 15.2 m (50 ft) and a maximum draft of 6.28 m (20.6 ft). She displaced 7,700 long tons (7,800 t) at full load. The ship had a forecastle deck that extended for most of the length of the ship, ending just aft of the superfiring rear turret. Her superstructure consisted of a conning tower forward with a heavy, tubular mast and a secondary conning tower further aft. Karlsruhe had a crew of 21 officers and 493 enlisted men.

Her propulsion system consisted of four steam turbines and a pair of 10-cylinder four-stroke diesel engines. Steam for the turbines was provided by six Marine-type, double-ended, oil-fired water-tube boilers, which were vented through a pair of funnels. The ship's propulsion system provided a top speed of 32 knots (59 km/h; 37 mph) and a range of approximately 5,700 nautical miles (10,600 km; 6,600 mi) at 19 knots (35 km/h; 22 mph).

The ship was armed with a main battery of nine 15 cm (5.9 in) SK C/25 guns mounted in three triple gun turrets. One was located forward, and two were placed in a superfiring pair aft. The rear gun turrets were offset to increase their arc of fire. They were supplied with 1,080 rounds of ammunition, for 120 shells per gun. The ship was also equipped with two 8.8 cm (3.5 in) SK L/45 anti-aircraft guns in single mounts; they had 400 rounds of ammunition each. Karlsruhe also carried four triple torpedo tube mounts located amidships; they were supplied with twenty-four 50 cm (20 in) torpedoes. She was also capable of carrying 120 naval mines. The ship was protected by an armor deck that was 40 mm (1.6 in) thick amidships and an armor belt that was 50 mm (2 in) thick. The conning tower had 100 mm (3.9 in) thick sides.

== Service history ==
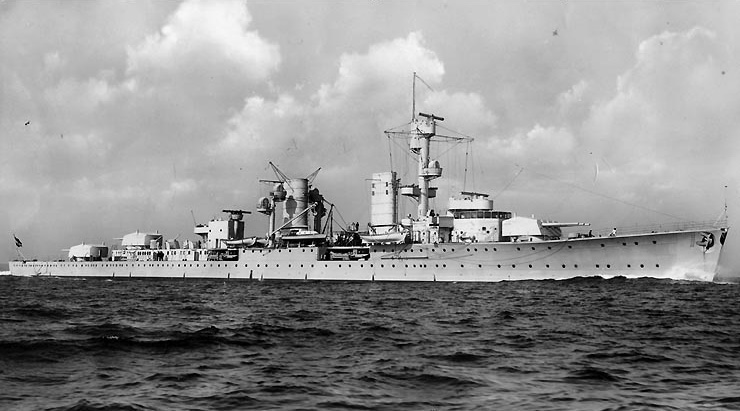
Karlsruhe circa 1930

The new cruiser was ordered as "Cruiser C" and given the temporary name Ersatz Medusa as a replacement for the old cruiser Medusa. Construction of Karlsruhe began on 27 July 1926 with her keel laying at the Deutsche Werke shipyard in Kiel. She was launched on 20 August 1927 and was commissioned into the Reichsmarine on 6 November 1929. Karlsruhe completed sea trials in the Baltic Sea after entering service, after which she was assigned to training ship duty. In May 1930, she departed on her first overseas training cruise, to Africa and South America. After returning to Germany, she was modernized late in the year; her foremast was shortened, and her rear superstructure was slightly enlarged. Over the next five years, she embarked on four more world cruises for naval cadets, traveling as far as Japan. Between each cruise, she conducted exercises with the rest of the fleet in German waters. Günther Lütjens served as the ship's commander from September 1934 to September 1935. In 1935, she had more modifications made, including the installation of a pole mast aft of the funnels, along with an aircraft catapult amidships with a crane to handle floatplanes.

On her last training cruise in 1936, Karlsruhe was badly damaged by a tropical storm in the Pacific Ocean. Structural weaknesses in her mostly-welded hull plating caused significant damage, and the cruiser was forced to put into San Diego in April for repairs. There, her hull was repaired and strengthened, which increased her displacement and beam slightly. She returned to Germany in June 1936, and immediately went into drydock for more permanent repairs and a major overhaul. During this period in dockyard hands, she had her two single-mount 8.8 cm anti-aircraft guns replaced with three twin-mounts. One SL-1 stabilized fire control director was also installed for these guns. After emerging from this refit, she conducted sea trials and then joined the non-intervention patrols during the Spanish Civil War, though she only remained off Spain for a few months.

=== World War II ===
After returning to Germany, she resumed training duties in the Baltic. She was withdrawn from service in May 1938 for a major modernization. The funnels were modified with raked caps and searchlight platforms on their sides. The ship's 8.8 cm anti-aircraft guns were replaced with more powerful 10.5 cm guns. Work lasted until November 1939, shortly after the outbreak of World War II. She spent the next several months on trials and training maneuvers. On 4 January, Karlsruhe and the minelayer Schiff 23 were sent to intercept the Swedish steamer Konung Oscar, which was transporting Polish refugees from Riga to Sweden. Karlsruhe caught the Swedish vessel, declared it a prize, and sent it and the 41 Poles aboard to Memel. She was not ready for combat operations by the start of Operation Weserübung, so she was used as a troop transport for the attack on Kristiansand. The attack force also included an E-boat tender, four large torpedo boats, and several E-boats.

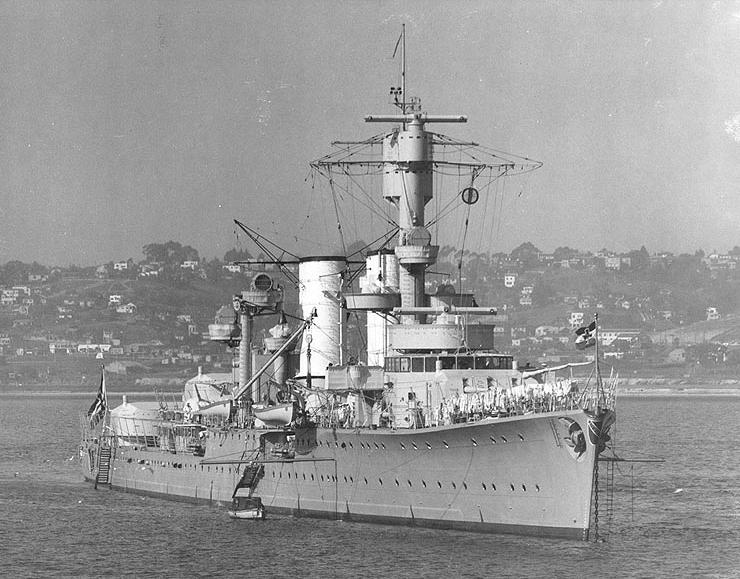
Karlsruhe in San Diego in 1934

The invasion force departed Bremerhaven early on 8 April 1940 with Kapitän zur See Friedrich Rieve aboard Karlsruhe commanding. When it arrived at Kristiansand, heavy fog covered the area, making the passage of the fjord outside the harbor very hazardous. As a result, the German ships had to wait until the morning of 9 April to begin the attack. As Karlsruhe entered the fjord, she came under heavy fire from the Norwegian coastal guns at Odderøya Fortress. The cruiser turned in the fjord to bring her full broadside into action; the artillery duel lasted for about two hours before heavy fog again covered the port, forcing both sides to cease fire. The Norwegians surrendered an hour later, and the German ships landed their embarked troops.

Karlsruhe then left Kristiansand on the evening of 9 April with three of the torpedo boats as escorts. The British submarine HMS Truant was positioned outside the fjord, and when her crew spotted the German ships, she fired a spread of torpedoes. Karlsruhe took evasive action, but one torpedo struck her on the starboard side amidships, blasting a large hole in the hull and allowing thousands of tons of water to flood in. The flooding disabled her engines and partially her electrical generators, which cut off power to some of the pumps that were trying to keep pace with the incoming water. With those pumps compromised, Rieve decided there was no hope of saving Karlsruhe and issued the order to abandon ship two hours after the attack. The torpedo boat Greif took off her crew and fired two more torpedoes into Karlsruhe to scuttle her.

Rieve and his executive officer were severely criticized in an investigation into the sinking for failing to take all possible steps to save Karlsruhe. The report concluded that since the ship was still afloat after two hours, and two additional torpedoes were required to sink her, it might have been possible to take her under tow back to Kristiansand or another port. In addition, the forward pumps still had power, and so the flooding could have been slowed enough to permit a return to a safe harbor.

=== The wreck ===
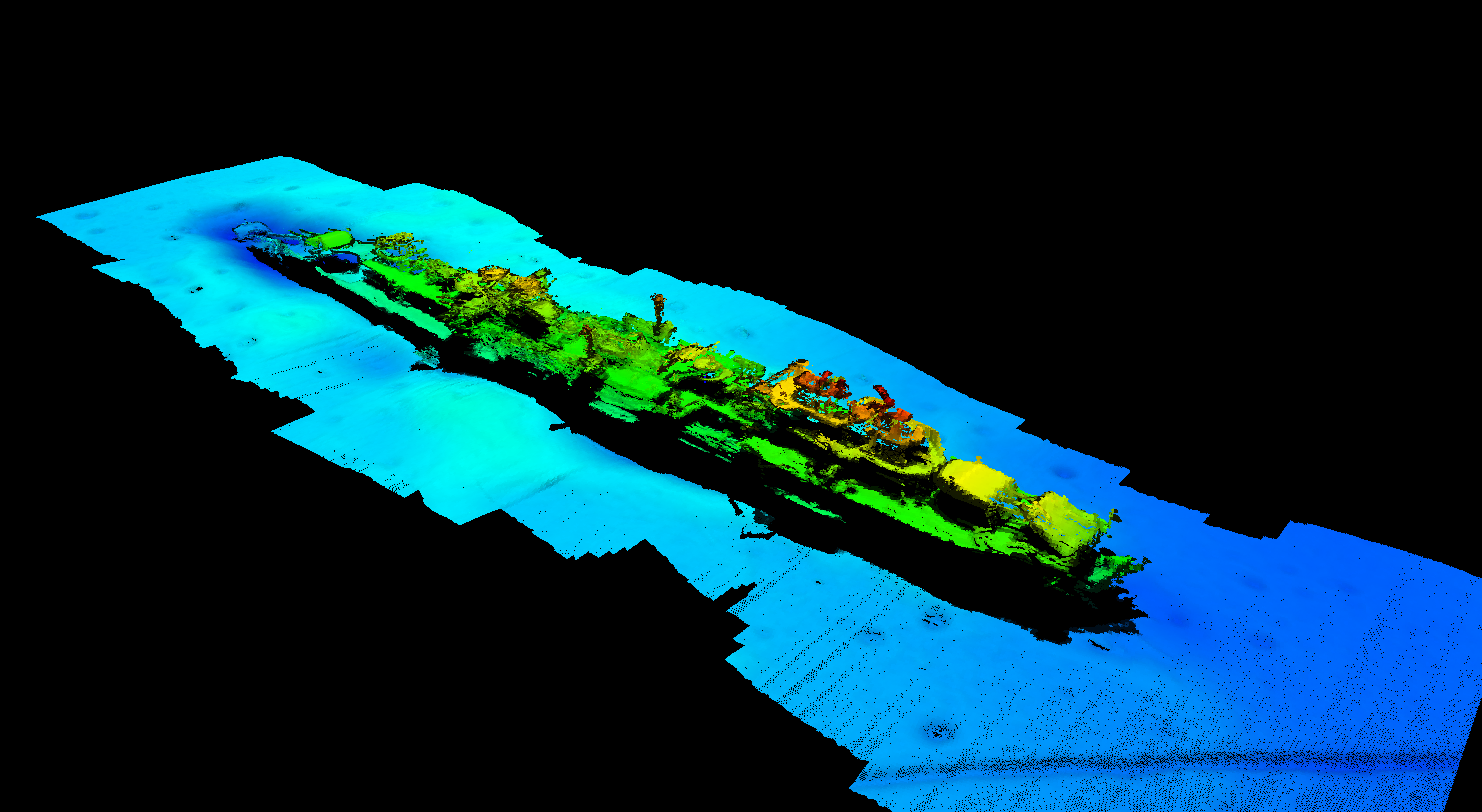
Processed survey data showing the wreck of Karlsruhe

Karlsruhe sank in deep water, and the exact position of the wreck remained unknown for more than 80 years. The Norwegian power grid operator Statnett conducted a sonar survey in April 2017 that located the wreck but did not identify it at the time. The vessel lies upright on the sea floor, 15 m (49 ft) from the submerged power line between Denmark and Norway, operated by Statnett. Karlsruhe's bow is no longer attached to the vessel. The wreck is some 13 nmi (24 km; 15 mi) off the Norwegian coast, at a depth of about 490 m (1,610 ft). Stattnet sent another expedition on 30 June 2020 with the survey vessel Olympic Taurus to conduct an investigation of the wreck using remotely operated underwater vehicles after a severe storm, to confirm that the cable had not been damaged. The company confirmed in September that it was Karlsruhe.
