= 8.8 cm SK C/25 naval gun =

8.8 cm SK C/25
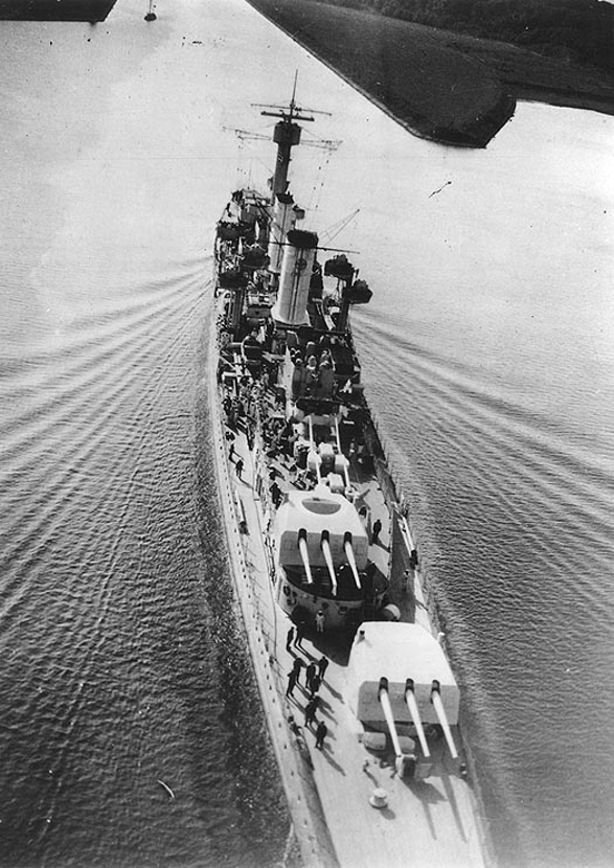
- Two dual 8.8 cm SK C/25 are installed on the German light cruiser Köln, just behind the aft main battery turrets
- Type: Naval gun Anti-aircraft gun
- Place of origin: Germany

Service history
- In service: 1930—1931
- Used by: Nazi Germany

Specifications
- Caliber: 88 millimeters (3.5 in)
- Traverse: 360°

The 8.8 cm SK C/25 (Note: SK - Schnelladekanone (quick loading cannon); C - Construktionsjahr (year of design)) was a German naval gun intended as a heavy anti-aircraft gun on the capital ships of the Reichsmarine.

== Description ==
In order to replace the obsolete 8.8 cm SK L/45 anti-aircraft gun, the Reichsmarine started to develop a new gun in 1925. It was intended to arm the new Königsberg-class light cruisers with the weapon, and also the new heavy cruiser (Panzerschiff) Deutschland. The first ship to receive the new guns was the light cruiser Köln in 1930. During trials the gun was found not to be satisfactory and hence not installed on other ships. In 1931 the guns were removed from Köln.

Two guns were mounted in a dual Gun carriage (Doppel Lafette) C/25. The gun carriage was designed to incorporate two novelties : the mounting was stabilised against rolling and pitching, and the guns were directed using a Fire-control system. The fuse-setting mechanism and the stabilisation were installed centrally on the mounting, causing the barrels of the battery to be mounted too far from the center, which caused too much vibration and inaccuracy when the guns were fired. It was also discovered that two-axis stabilisation was insufficient for accurate targeting of aircraft. Both problems were tackled with the subsequent gun carriage C/31 which mounted the 8.8 cm SK C/31 and its improved version the gun carriage C/32 which mounted the 8.8 cm SK C/32.
