= German cruiser Königsberg =

Königsberg-class cruiser

Coordinates: 60°24′N 05°19′E

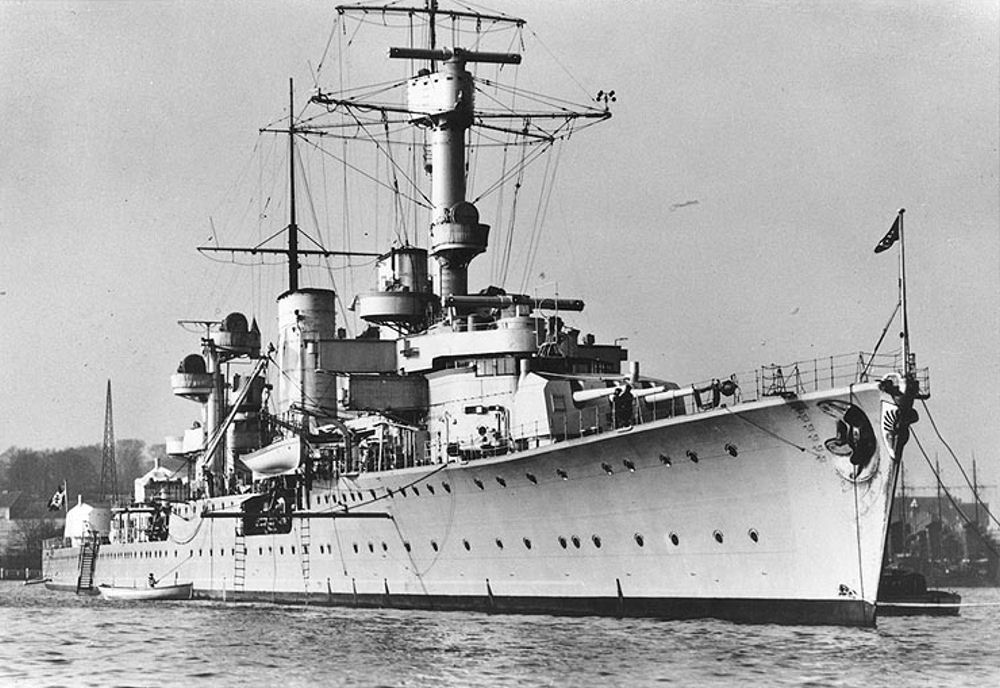
- Königsberg in 1936

History

Germany
- Name: Königsberg
- Builder: Reichsmarinewerft, Wilhelmshaven
- Laid down: 12 April 1926
- Launched: 26 March 1927
- Commissioned: 17 April 1929
- Fate: Sunk 10 April 1940 at Bergen, Norway

General characteristics (Note: These statistics are for the ship as completed; over the course of her career, armament, crew size, and other characteristics of the ship changed.)
- Class & type: Königsberg-class light cruiser
- Displacement: 7,700 long tons (7,800 t)
- Length: 174 m (570 ft 10 in)
- Beam: 15.3 m (50 ft 2 in)
- Draft: 6.28 m (20 ft 7 in)
- Installed power: 6 × water-tube boilers; 65,000 shaft horsepower (48,000 kW)
- Propulsion: 2 × MAN 10-cylinder diesel engines; 4 × geared steam turbines; 2 screw propellers
- Speed: 32 knots (59 km/h; 37 mph)
- Range: 5,700 nmi (10,600 km; 6,600 mi) at 19 knots (35 km/h; 22 mph)
- Complement: 21 officers; 493 enlisted men
- Armament: 9 × 15 cm (5.9 in) SL C/25 guns; 2 × 8.8 cm (3.5 in) SK L/45 anti-aircraft guns; 12 × 50 cm (20 in) torpedo tubes; 120 mines
- Armor: Belt: 50 mm (2 in); Deck: 40 mm (1.6 in); Conning tower: 100 mm (3.9 in)

Königsberg was a German light cruiser that was operated between 1929 and April 1940, including service in World War II. She was the lead vessel of her class and was operated by two German navies, the Reichsmarine and the Kriegsmarine. She had two sister ships, Karlsruhe and Köln. Königsberg was built by the Kriegsmarinewerft in Wilhelmshaven; she was laid down in April 1926, launched in March 1927, and commissioned into the Reichsmarine in April 1929. She was armed with a main battery of nine 15 cm SK C/25 guns in three triple turrets and had a top speed of 32 knots (59 km/h; 37 mph).

Königsberg served as a training ship for naval cadets throughout the 1930s, and joined the non-intervention patrols during the Spanish Civil War in the late 1930s. After the outbreak of World War II in September 1939, she laid defensive minefields in the North Sea and then participated in Operation Weserübung, the invasion of Norway in April 1940. While attacking Bergen, she was badly damaged by Norwegian coastal artillery, and sunk by Blackburn Skua fighter-bombers from the Fleet Air Arm the following day in the harbor. The wreck was eventually raised in 1942 and broken up for scrap in 1947.

== Design ==
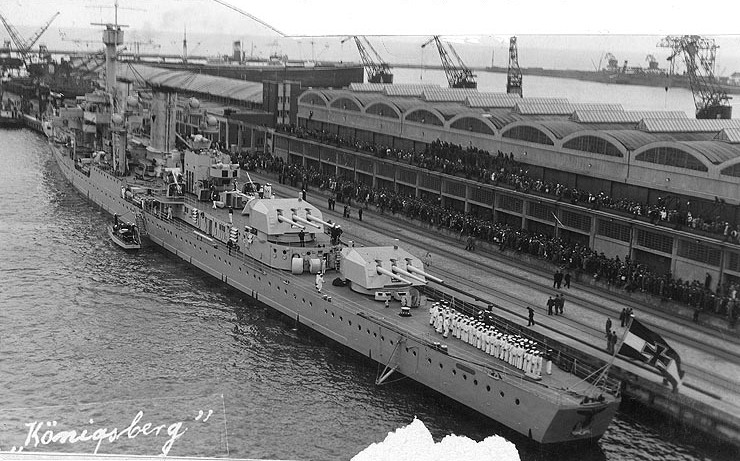
Königsberg in port; note the offset arrangement of the rear gun turrets

Königsberg was 174 meters (571 ft) long overall and had a beam of 15.2 m (50 ft) and a maximum draft of 6.28 m (20.6 ft). She displaced 7,700 long tons (7,800 t) at full load. The ship had a forecastle deck that extended for most of the length of the ship, ending just aft of the superfiring rear turret. Her superstructure consisted of a conning tower forward with a heavy, tubular mast and a secondary conning tower further aft. Königsberg had a crew of 21 officers and 493 enlisted men.

Her propulsion system consisted of four steam turbines and a pair of 10-cylinder four-stroke diesel engines. Steam for the turbines was provided by six Marine-type, double-ended, oil-fired water-tube boilers, which were vented through a pair of funnels. The ship's propulsion system provided a top speed of 32 knots (59 km/h; 37 mph) and a range of approximately 5,700 nautical miles (10,600 km; 6,600 mi) at 19 knots (35 km/h; 22 mph).

The ship was armed with a main battery of nine 15 cm (5.9 in) SK C/25 guns mounted in three triple gun turrets. One was located forward, and two were placed in a superfiring pair aft. The rear gun turrets were offset to increase their arc of fire. They were supplied with 1,080 rounds of ammunition, for 120 shells per gun. The ship was also equipped with two 8.8 cm (3.5 in) SK L/45 anti-aircraft guns in single mounts; they had 400 rounds of ammunition each. Königsberg also carried four triple torpedo tube mounts located amidships; they were supplied with twenty-four 50 cm (20 in) torpedoes. She was also capable of carrying 120 naval mines. The ship was protected by an armor deck that was 40 mm (1.6 in) thick amidships and an armor belt that was 50 mm (2 in) thick. The conning tower had 100 mm (3.9 in) thick sides.

== Service history ==
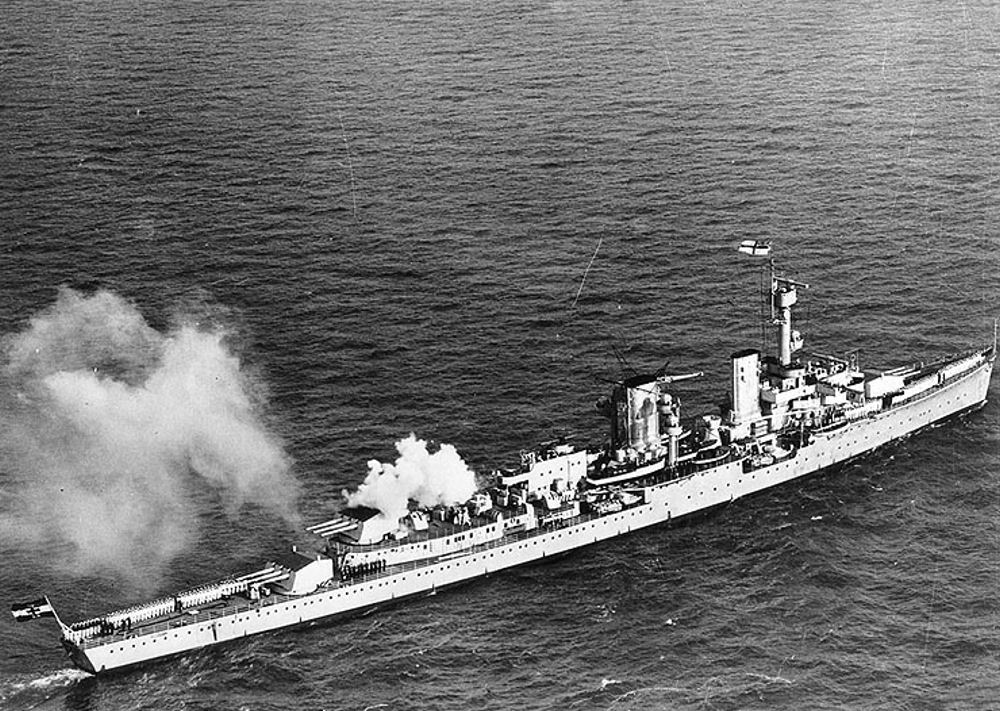
Königsberg on her visit to Britain in 1934; she is flying the British White Ensign and firing a salute

Königsberg was ordered as "Cruiser B" and given the temporary name Ersatz Thetis, since she was intended to replace the old cruiser Thetis. She was laid down at the Reichsmarinewerft in Wilhelmshaven on 12 April 1926 and launched on 26 March 1927. She was commissioned into the Reichsmarine on 17 April 1929. After her commissioning, the ship was assigned as the flagship of the reconnaissance force for the German fleet. She thereafter conducted a series of training cruises for naval cadets and made numerous goodwill visits throughout the Mediterranean Sea. In 1931, the ship's first major modification took place; her foremast was shortened and her rear superstructure was slightly lengthened. Otto von Schrader commanded the ship from September 1931 to September 1934. Hubert Schmundt relieved him and served as the ship's captain for the following year. In 1934, a pair of 8.8 cm (3.5 in) anti-aircraft guns in individual mounts were installed on her aft superstructure just forward of her main battery turrets. That same year, she and the cruiser Leipzig made the first goodwill visit to the United Kingdom since the end of World War I sixteen years earlier.

In 1935, the ship had an aircraft catapult installed, along with a crane to handle floatplanes. The following year, the single 8.8 cm guns were replaced with a new triaxially stabilized twin-mount; two other twin mounts were added on the rear superstructure. One SL-1 stabilized fire control director for the anti-aircraft guns was also installed. After emerging from this refit, Königsberg was employed as a gunnery training ship. During the Spanish Civil War in the late 1930s, the ship participated in non-intervention patrols, during which she forced Republicans to surrender a German freighter they had seized.

After returning to Germany, Königsberg resumed her gunnery training duties, and also served as a testbed for radar prototypes. She was scheduled to be transferred to the U-boat School, where she would be used as a target ship for U-boat crews. This duty was interrupted by the outbreak of World War II in September 1939. One day before the German invasion of Poland, on 31 August, Königsberg spotted the Polish destroyers Burza and Błyskawica in the Baltic. At the start of hostilities, she and several other German cruisers laid a defensive minefield in the North Sea. She then went into the Baltic Sea for training maneuvers. Kurt-Caesar Hoffmann served as the ship's captain from June to September 1939. In late 1939, a degaussing coil was installed on the ship's hull. Königsberg returned to active duty in March 1940, when she was assigned to the invasion force for the attack on Norway.

=== Operation Weserübung ===
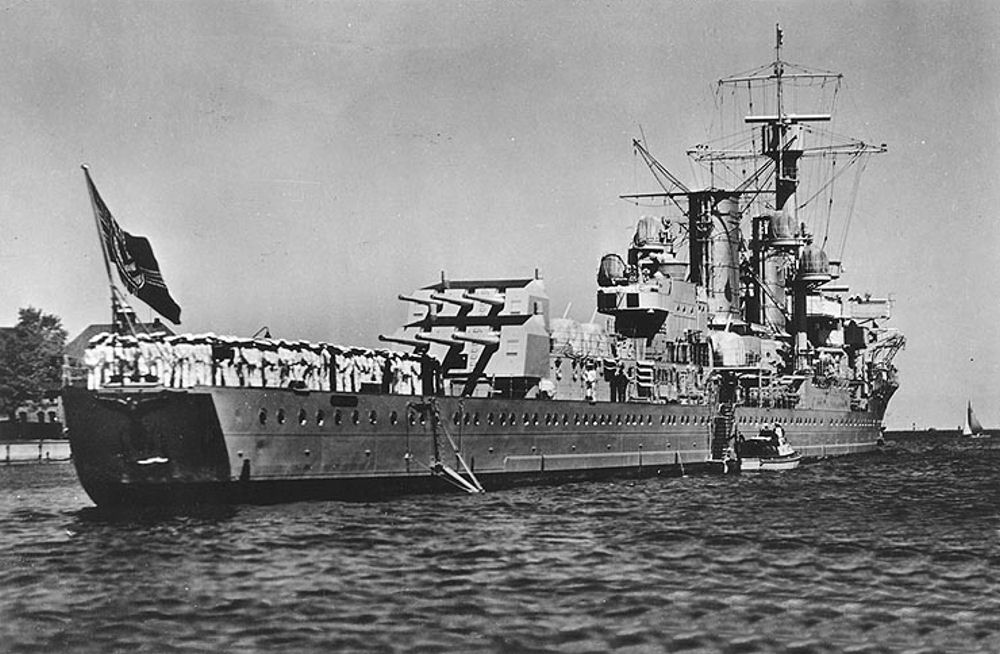
Königsberg circa 1936

The invasion of Norway took place in early April 1940. Königsberg was assigned to Gruppe 3, and was tasked with transporting 600 troops from the Wehrmacht's 69th Infantry Division from Wilhelmshaven to Bergen, Norway. Gruppe 3 also included her sister ship Köln, the artillery training ship Bremse, and the torpedo boats Wolf and Leopard. The Germans left Wilhelmshaven on 8 April, and had reached their target the following day, where Königsberg transferred part of the landing party to several smaller vessels. She then made a high-speed run into the port in an attempt to land the remainder of the infantry in the town directly. A 21 cm (8.3 in) coastal battery at the Kvarven Fort took the ship under fire, and scored three hits, all forward. The hits caused severe flooding and fires in her boiler rooms that cut the ship's power. Adrift, and unable to maneuver, Königsberg had to drop anchor, while she and Köln, Luftwaffe bombers, and the infantry neutralized the Norwegian guns.

Königsberg required major repairs before she would be able to return to Germany, so she was temporarily moored in the harbor with her broadside facing the harbor entrance. This would allow her to bring all of her main battery guns to bear against any British naval attack. The rest of Gruppe 3 returned to Germany. On the evening of 9 April, she was attacked by British bombers, but to no effect. The following morning, the British launched another air raid on the ship. The raid consisted of sixteen Blackburn Skua dive bombers of the British Fleet Air Arm (seven of 800 Naval Air Squadron and nine of 803 Naval Air Squadron), launched from RNAS Hatston, Orkney. Königsberg's thin deck armor rendered her quite vulnerable to dive bomber attack. The Skuas attacked in three groups: the nine of 803 NAS, six of 800 NAS, and one aircraft of 800 NAS which lost contact during the outward flight but found Königsberg independently. The dive bombers attacked at 7:20, catching the ship's crew off guard. Half of the dive bombers had completed their dives before the crew realized they were under attack. Only one large anti-aircraft gun was reported as being manned with shells being fired once every five seconds from the aft of the ship with lighter anti-air weapons firing from the shore and adjacent ships firing even later in the attack.

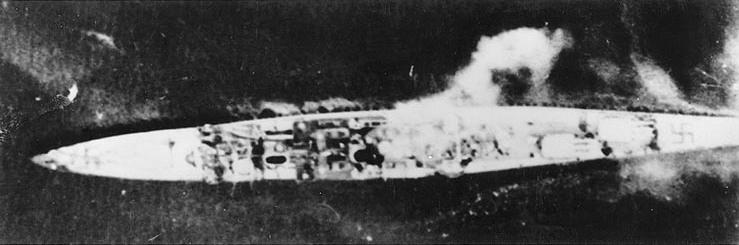
Königsberg under attack at Bergen

Königsberg was hit by at least five 500-pound (230 kg) bombs, which caused serious damage to the ship. One penetrated her thin deck armor, went through the ship, and exploded in the water, causing significant structural damage. Another hit destroyed the auxiliary boiler room. Two more bombs exploded in the water next to the ship; the concussion from the blasts tore large holes in the hull. She took on a heavy list almost immediately, and the captain ordered the crew to abandon the ship. It took slightly less than three hours from the start of the attack for the ship to completely capsize and sink, which gave the crew enough time to evacuate many of the dead and wounded. They also had time to remove a significant amount of ammunition and equipment from the stricken cruiser. Eighteen men were killed in the attack.

The wreck was raised on 17 July 1942 and towed to Heggernes (Nyhavn). It was later towed to Laksevåg (on the south side of Bergen harbor) and righted. However, the hulk could only be kept afloat by constant pumping, and was therefore put into the floating dock at Laksevåg. The wreck fell over when the dock was raised, causing considerable damage to the dock, and leaving it with a 11-13 degree list. The hull was, however, sealed, and refloated, and remained at Laksevåg until February 1945, when it was towed to Herdlafjorden, and allowed to settle, with a heavy list, at Berlandsundet, to the east of the island of Askøy. The ship was salved once again on 14/15 September 1945 and to Stavanger, leaking throughout. Scrapping was completed there by 1947.
