= Königsberg-class cruiser (1927) =

Class of 1920s German light cruisers

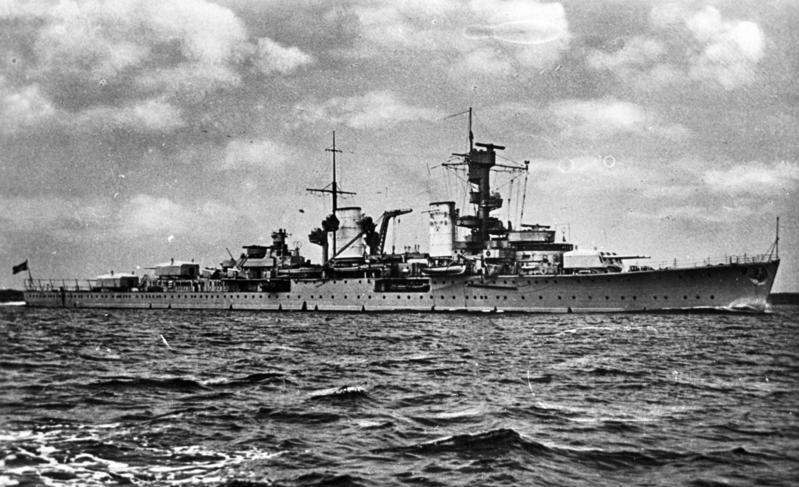
- A member of the Königsberg class in 1936

Class overview
- Operators: Reichsmarine; Kriegsmarine
- Preceded by: Emden
- Succeeded by: Leipzig class
- In service: 1929–1945
- Completed: 3
- Lost: 3

General characteristics (Note: These statistics are for the ships as completed; over the course of their careers, armament, crew size, and other characteristics of the ships changed.)
- Type: Light cruiser
- Displacement: 6,000 long tons (6,100 t) (standard); 7,700 long tons (7,800 t) (full load)
- Length: 174 m (571 ft)
- Beam: 15.3 m (50 ft)
- Draft: 6.28 m (20.6 ft)
- Installed power: 6 × water-tube boilers; 65,000 shaft horsepower (48,000 kW)
- Propulsion: 2 × MAN 10-cylinder diesel engines; 4 × geared steam turbines; 2 screw propellers
- Speed: 32 knots (59 km/h; 37 mph)
- Range: 5,700 nmi (10,600 km; 6,600 mi) at 19 kn (35 km/h; 22 mph)
- Complement: 21 officers; 493 enlisted men
- Armament: 9 × 15 cm SK C/25 guns; 2 × 8.8 cm SK L/45 anti-aircraft guns; 12 × 50 cm torpedoes; 120 mines
- Armor: Belt: 50 mm (2 in); Deck: 40 mm (1.6 in); Conning tower: 100 mm (3.9 in)

The Königsberg class, sometimes referred to as the K class, was a class of light cruisers of the German Reichsmarine and Kriegsmarine. The class comprised three ships named after German cities: Königsberg, Karlsruhe, and Köln, all built between 1926 and 1930. These ships were the first of the Reichsmarine with a modern cruiser design; their predecessor, Emden, was based on World War I-era designs. They were armed with a main battery of nine 15 cm (5.9 in) guns and with twelve 50 cm (20 in) torpedo tubes.

All three ships of the class were used extensively as training cruisers throughout the 1930s. They went on numerous overseas cruises and participated in the non-intervention patrols during the Spanish Civil War in 1936–1939. After the outbreak of World War II in September 1939, the three ships laid defensive minefields in the North Sea. They all saw action in Operation Weserübung, the invasion of Norway, in April 1940; Königsberg was damaged by Norwegian coastal guns outside Bergen and sunk by British bombers the following day. Karlsruhe was sunk by the British submarine HMS Truant; only Köln survived the attack on Norway.

After returning to Germany, Köln operated Flettner Fl 282 helicopters as an experiment. She provided gunfire support to German ground forces during Operation Barbarossa, the invasion of the Soviet Union in 1941, and returned to Norway in 1942. Ultimately, she was sunk in Wilhelmshaven in March 1945 by American bombers. Her guns were still above water, which allowed her to support the defending German army against British ground forces until the final days of the war.

== Design ==
=== General characteristics ===
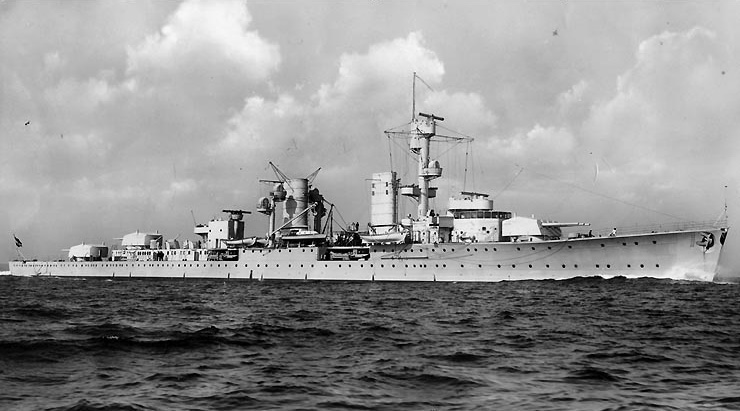
Karlsruhe circa 1930

The ships of the Königsberg class were 169 meters (554 ft) long at the waterline and 174 m (571 ft) long overall. They had a beam of 15.2 m (50 ft) and a maximum draft of 6.28 m (20.6 ft). They had a design displacement of 6,750 metric tons (6,640 long tons; 7,440 short tons) and a standard displacement, as defined by the Washington Naval Treaty, of 6,000 long tons (6,100 t). They displaced 7,700 long tons (7,800 t) at full load. The ships' hulls were constructed from longitudinal steel frames and incorporated extensive welding to save weight; up to 85 percent of the hulls were welded rather than riveted. The hull was divided into nineteen watertight compartments and had a double bottom that extended for 72 percent of the length of the hull.

The Königsberg-class cruisers had a standard crew of 21 officers and 493 enlisted men. This later increased to 23 officers and 588–591 enlisted men, and during World War II, the crew size rose to between 820 and 850 officers and men. The ships carried a number of smaller vessels, including two picket boats, two barges, two launches, one cutter, and one dinghy. The ships were moderately good sea boats, but had the potential to capsize if internal stores were improperly loaded, and suffered from a slight lee helm. They heeled up to twenty degrees with the rudder hard over. They were nevertheless very maneuverable and lost little speed in a head sea. In a hard turn, they lost up to 20 percent speed.

In the 1930s, all three members of the class were modified to carry a pair of float planes for reconnaissance. They were equipped with an aircraft catapult to launch the planes and cranes to recover them after they landed in the water. The ships initially carried two Heinkel He 60 biplane float planes, replaced later in the decade with two Arado Ar 196 monoplane float planes. Only one aircraft could be stored on the catapult at a time; the second plane had to be disassembled and placed in storage, and the ships did not have a hangar to store it in.

=== Machinery ===
Plan of 15 cm gun turret

Their propulsion system consisted of four steam turbines and a pair of 10-cylinder four-stroke diesel engines. The turbines were split into three engine rooms, with the diesels in their own rooms directly aft of the turbines. Steam for the turbines was provided by six Marine-type double-ended oil-fired water-tube boilers. The engines powered a pair of three-bladed screws that were 4.1 m (13 ft) wide on the first two ships and 3.7 m (12 ft) in diameter on Köln. The ships' propulsion system provided a top speed of 32 kn (59 km/h; 37 mph) and were rated at 65,000 shaft horsepower (48,000 kW), though all three ships exceeded 68,000 shp (51,000 kW) on speed trials. The ships carried 600 t (590 long tons; 660 short tons) of fuel oil as designed, but could store up to 1,350 t (1,330 long tons; 1,490 short tons). This gave them a range of approximately 5,700 nautical miles (10,600 km; 6,600 mi) at 19 kn (35 km/h; 22 mph) and 7,300 nmi (13,500 km; 8,400 mi) at 17 kn (31 km/h; 20 mph). Steering was controlled by a single rudder. The ships had three turbo-generators and two diesel generators for electricity; the generators had a combined output of 540 kilowatts (720 hp) at 220 Volts.

=== Armament ===
The ships were armed with nine 15 cm SK C/25 guns mounted in three triple gun turrets. One turret was located forward, and two were placed in a superfiring pair aft. The rear gun turrets were offset to increase their arc of fire. They were supplied with 1,080 rounds of ammunition, for 120 shells per gun. As built, the ships were also equipped with two 8.8 cm SK L/45 anti-aircraft guns in single mounts; they had 400 rounds of ammunition each. The Königsberg class also carried four triple torpedo tube mounts located amidships; they were supplied with twenty-four 50 cm (20 in) torpedoes, though these were replaced with 53.3 cm (21 in) models by 1940. The ships were also capable of carrying 120 naval mines.

Midship frame with position of armor

The ships' anti-aircraft batteries were revised and improved throughout the course of their careers. The original single-mounted 8.8 cm guns were replaced with twin mounts for the new 8.8 cm SK C/32 guns and a third twin mount was also installed, bringing the number of guns to six. Eight 3.7 cm SK C/30 guns were installed in the mid-1930s and up to eight 2 cm Flak 30 guns were also added. Köln, the only ship to survive to the end of the war, was ultimately armed with eight 3.7 cm and eighteen 2 cm guns, though provisions had been made to mount up to ten and twenty-four guns of the two calibers, respectively.

=== Armor ===
The ships were protected by an armored deck that was 40 mm (1.6 in) thick amidships and tapered down to 20 mm (0.79 in) on either end. They had an armored belt that was 50 mm (2 in) thick and capped with 70 mm (2.8 in) thick bulkheads on either end of the belt. Underwater protection consisted of a 15 mm (0.59 in) torpedo bulkhead and a 20 mm collision bulkhead. The conning tower had 100 mm (3.9 in) sides and a 30 mm (1.2 in) roof. The ships' gun turrets had 30 mm faces and 20 mm roofs, sides, and rears. The barbettes for the turrets were also 30 mm thick. Karlsruhe was later fitted with increased armor protection, consisting of a 10 to 14 mm (0.39 to 0.55 in) outer plating that consisted of the new Wotan weich steel, and an upper deck that was 16 mm (0.63 in), also Wotan weich.

== Construction ==
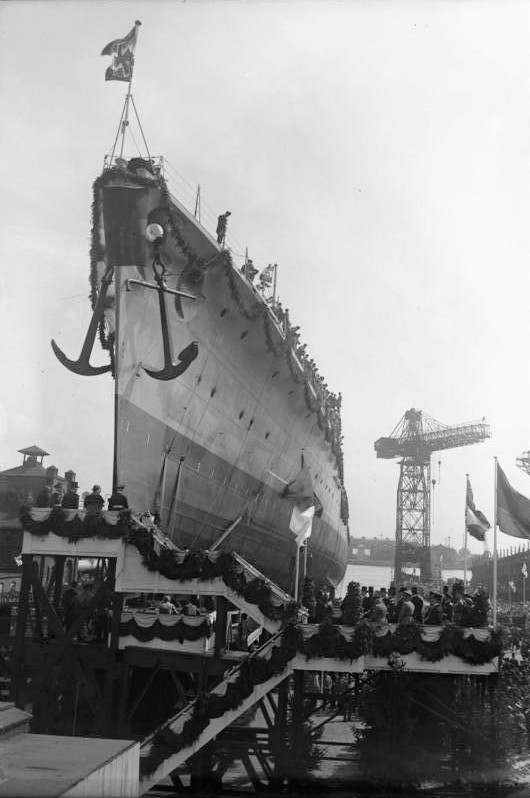
Köln at her launching on 23 May 1928

Construction data
Name	Builder	Laid down	Launched	Commissioned	Fate
Königsberg	Reichsmarinewerft, Wilhelmshaven	12 April 1926	26 March 1927	17 April 1929	Sunk in air attack at Bergen, 10 April 1940
Karlsruhe	Deutsche Werke, Kiel	27 July 1926	20 August 1927	6 November 1929	Scuttled following submarine attack, 9 April 1940
Köln	Reichsmarinewerft, Wilhelmshaven	7 August 1926	23 May 1928	15 January 1930	Partially sunk in air attack, 30 March 1945; Broken up at Wilhelmshaven, 1956

== Service history ==
All three ships of the Königsberg class served as training cruisers for naval cadets throughout the 1930s. They conducted numerous cruises in European waters, and both Karlsruhe and Köln traveled to other continents. They were all modified throughout the decade, and had their anti-aircraft armament repeatedly improved, along with other alterations. The three ships took part in the non-intervention patrols during the Spanish Civil War in 1936–1939, and after the outbreak of World War II in September 1939, they laid a series of defensive minefields in the North Sea.

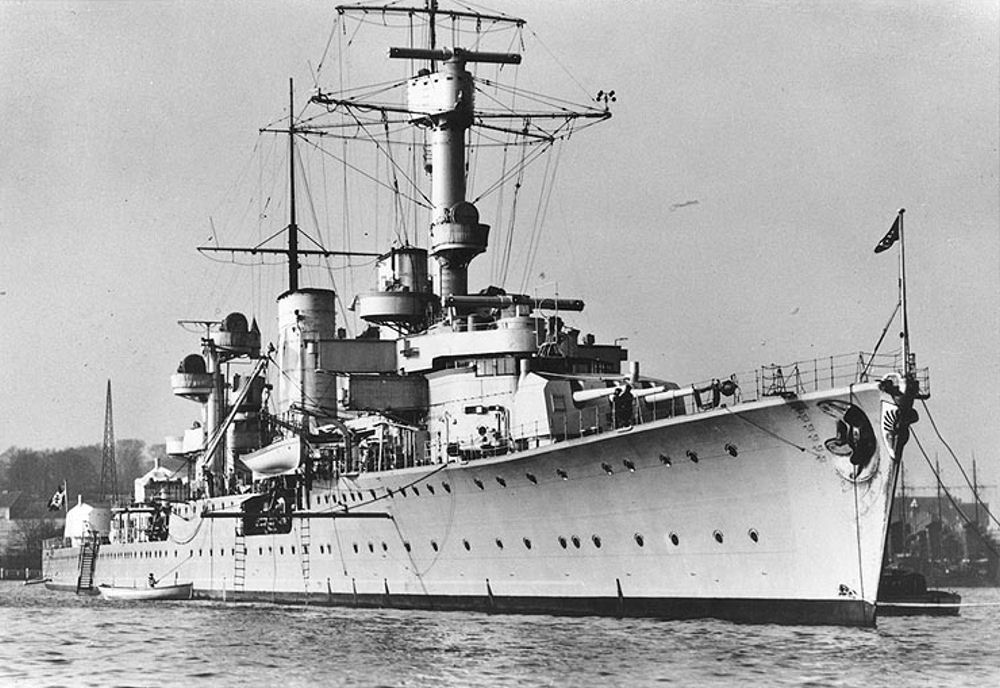
Königsberg in 1936

The three ships then participated in Operation Weserübung, the invasion of Norway, in April 1940. Königsberg and Köln were assigned to the assault on Bergen, while Karlsruhe joined the attack on Kristiansand. Königsberg came under heavy fire from a 21 cm (8.3 in) battery outside Bergen, and was badly damaged; after the port was captured, she moved into harbor for temporary repairs. She was ordered to return to Germany, but was attacked the next morning by British bombers and hit by at least five bombs. She sank slowly enough for the majority of her crew to escape; there were only eighteen men killed in the attack.

Karlsruhe meanwhile suppressed Norwegian coastal guns outside Kristiansand and successfully landed her contingent of ground troops. After Karlsruhe left port, the British submarine HMS Truant attacked the German cruiser and hit her with a pair of torpedoes. The torpedo hits knocked out Karlsruhe's power and thus prevented her crew from pumping out the water that was rapidly flooding the ship. Her crew was taken off by an escorting torpedo boat, which then fired a pair of torpedoes into the stricken cruiser to ensure she sank quickly. Her wreck was later discovered in 2017 and its identity confirmed in September 2020; it lies at a depth of 490 m (1,610 ft), some 13 nmi (24 km; 15 mi) off the coast of Norway.

Köln was the only ship of the class to survive the operations off Norway. After returning to Germany, she was modified to serve as a testbed for the Flettner Fl 282 helicopter. She thereafter served in the Baltic, providing gunfire support to advancing German troops in 1941. In mid 1942, she returned to Norwegian waters, and unsuccessfully attempted to attack Convoy PQ 18 along with several other German warships. She was then ordered back to Germany, where she served in a variety of roles, including training ship and convoy escort, before again returning to Norway. She was damaged by British bombers in December 1944 and forced to return to Germany for repairs. While in dock in Wilhelmshaven in March 1945, she was attacked and sunk by American heavy bombers. She sank on an even keel, with her guns still above water, which permitted their use against advancing British forces until the final days of the war.
