= Stabilisierter Leitstand =

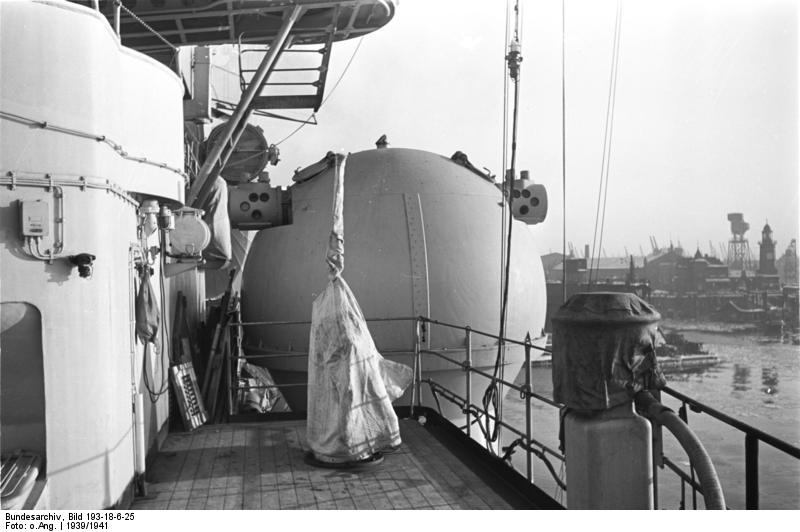
The forward port SL-8 on the battleship Bismarck, with the sides of the optical rangefinder protruding from the spherical protective shield

A Stabilisierter Leitstand (English: stabilized director post), abbreviated SL, was a fire control element in German World War II era shipborne heavy anti-aircraft defense. One to four SL's were installed on all capital ships of the Kriegsmarine. A Stabilisierte Leitstand measured distance, bearing and height of the target. Angles for bearing and height were taken through an optical sight, whilst distance was measured with a stereoscopic rangefinder. The director post was stabilized on three axes: against pitch and roll so that measurements were taken in a horizontal plane. Stabilization against yaw kept the director post trained on the target even when the ship was turning. The measured data was processed by a director analog computer (German: Rechengerät) to calculate settings for the anti-aircraft battery. The director posts were colloquially called "Wackeltöpfe" (English: waggling pots) by the ships crew.

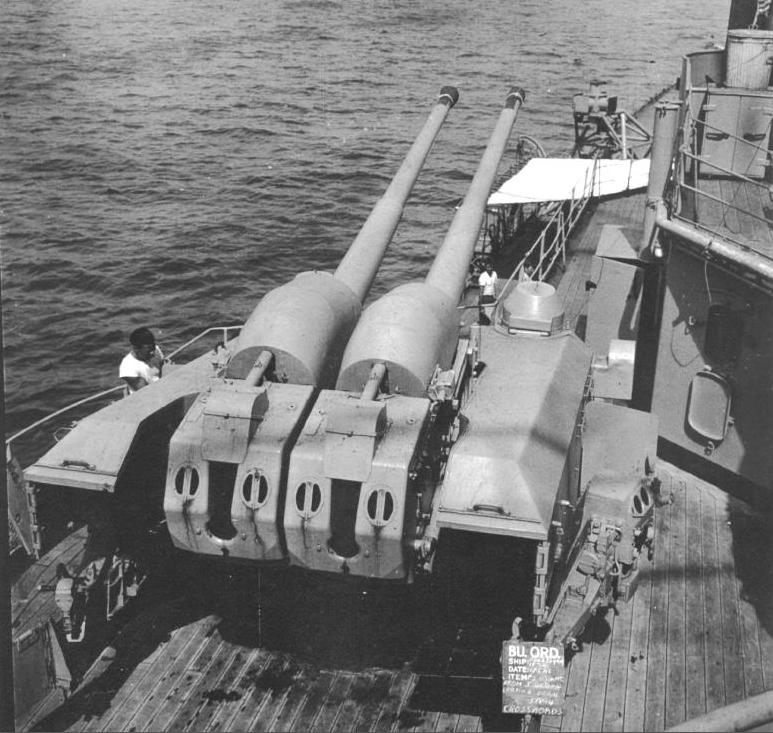
A twin 10.5 cm anti-aircraft gun, showing the fuse setting mechanism on the outer side of the protective shield

== Operation ==
The anti-aircraft artillery officer assigned targets to the Stabilisierte Leitstand. On German capital ships the anti-aircraft artillery officer was usually the second artillery officer ( "II AO" ), the first artillery officer ( "I AO" ) being responsible for the main artillery. The II AO selected targets from the anti-aircraft operation post (German: Fla-Einsatzstand), usually situated on the foretop of the ship. The anti-aircraft operation post was equipped with target selection devices (German: Zielanweisegerät, "ZAG" ), that transmitted the target's bearings to the Stabilisierte Leitstand. The ZAG was also stabilized on three axes. If there were multiple director posts and multiple anti-aircraft batteries then the II AO had also a switchboard to configure which battery/batteries a director post was guiding.

The Stabilisierte Leitstand was manned by four people: two aimers for the bearing and height angle sat backwards to the target whilst the control officer and the rangefinder were facing the target. Once a lock on the target was acquired the control officer signalled permission to fire to the director computer. From then on measurements could be fed to the director computer either intermittently or in continuous modus. As aircraft targets shifted range quickly, usually the measurements were fed in continuous modus.

The angles and distance measured by the SL were transmitted to a director computer which calculated the angles for the connected anti-aircraft batteries. Each SL director had its own anti-aircraft director computer. This computer also calculated the fuze settings and triggered the firing clock. The fuze setting mechanism was mounted on the outside of the protective shield for the anti-aircraft battery. The computer gave a horn signal when the round was set and had to be loaded into the gun and gave a bell signal when the gun had to be fired. The gun loaders could load a round on the fuse setting mechanism from inside the protective gun shield, which was open anyway towards the rear of the gun mounting. As the guns could not be mounted in turrets, there was no central ammunition feed. Munition had to be fetched from nearby munition hoists over the open deck which was a risky operation during attack. When the main battery was firing trained at extreme rotation angle, the blast of these guns rendered the operation of any nearby open anti-aircraft battery impossible.

As the heavy anti-aircraft battery was also the secondary armament on cruisers, a SL was also able to lock on sea targets. Depending on the nature of the target a different fire control modus was used: for fast moving small targets the director kept firing in anti-aircraft modus with time fuzes but for larger distances only independent fire was possible, or directed fire with limited assistance of auxiliary elements of the central director computer, used by the main battery.

== Versions ==
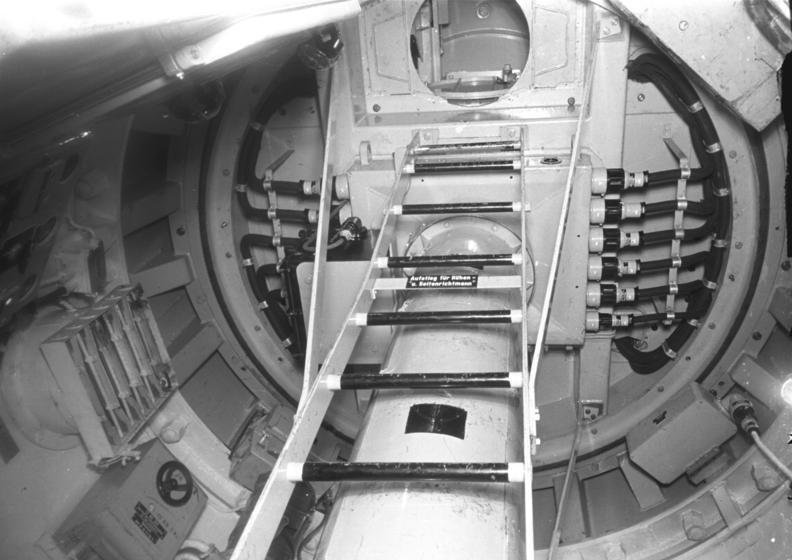
Inside the cylinder of the director, showing the access to the director post on top of the cylinder.

- In 1925, an experimental anti-aircraft fire control system was installed on the light cruiser Köln, consisting of a stabilized director, a rechengerät and four 8.8 cm SK C/25 naval guns in twin mountings. The director was stabilized by two levers, which kept the director in a horizontal plane. The gun barrels were mounted on tilting trunnions, making the gun mountings three axial. During tests, the stabilization proved to be unsatisfactory. The gun mounting proved to be unsatisfactory as well: there was too much distance between the two gun barrels, when fired this caused the mounting to swing. In order to mount the gun barrels as close as possible to the center of the gun mounting, the cant axis was introduced properly.
- The first cylindrical leitstand SL-1 was installed in 1934 on the light cruiser Leipzig. The SL-1 was equipped with an optical rangefinder with a base of 3 m. The horizontal stabilisation of the director was now regulated with sliding weights mounted on two axes. The director received also stabilization against yaw. The cant and tilt angle were also stabilized. For stabilization a 53 cm gyroscope and twenty engines were needed. During tests the director was easily offset by non-uniform distributed forces, like wind or crew movements. As the axes of the gyroscope tended to drift easily by the movements of the ship, an extra device (German: Horizontprüfer) was needed to measure the horizon and to recalibrate continuously the gyroscope. Test were executed with the three-axial twin 3.7 cm SK C/30 gun mounting, as the three-axial gun mounting for the heavy anti-aircraft gun was not yet ready. Eventually all five light cruisers of the Kriegsmarine were equipped with one SL-1 on the afterdeck and six or eight 8.8 cm SK C/32 naval guns in twin C/32 mountings. The SL-1 weighted 21 tonnes.
- The first heavy cruiser of the Kriegsmarine Deutschland was equipped with two improved SL-2's in 1934 for directing its six 8.8 cm SK C/31 naval gun mounted in twin C/31 mountings. These directors were placed above the signal bridge and abaft the funnel. In the SL-2 the drifting of the gyroscopes was neutralized by pendula, and hence the very expensive Horizontprüfer could be omitted. The SL-2 could tilt by twelve degrees around its vertical axis.
- Since on the next two Deutschland-class heavy cruisers Admiral Scheer and Admiral Graf Spee the place abaft the funnel was taken by the catapult, they received three SL-4: one above the bridge and one each on port and starboard of the funnel. Tests executed in 1936 showed that the yaw stabilization was insufficient to cope with sharp changes of course. These directors still did not allow for any Parallax correction. A parallax correction takes into account the difference in position on the ship of the director and the gun. Since both guns and directors were placed close enough on all the ships, the size of the multiple shell explosions was thought to compensate for the relative small parallax error.
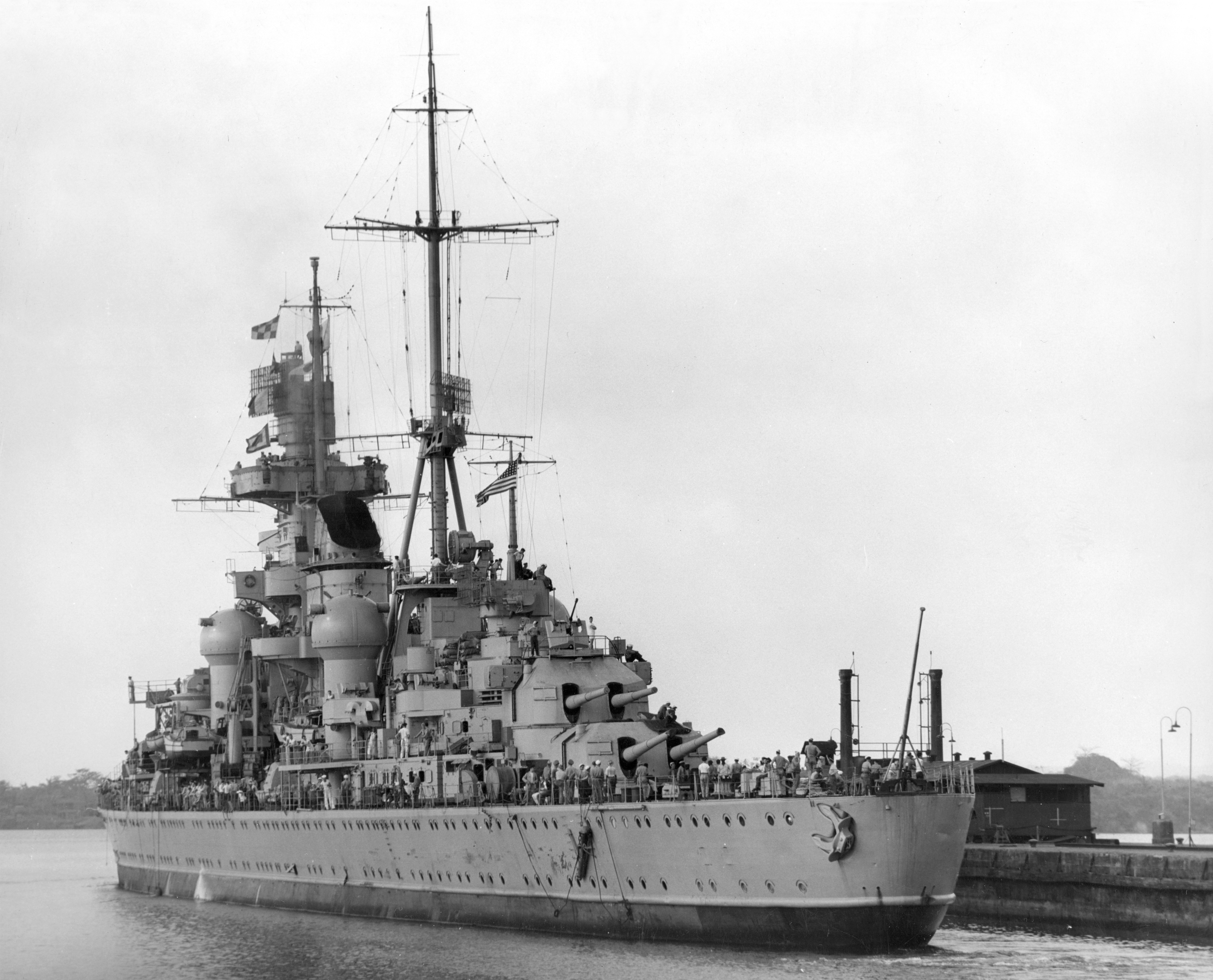
- The spherical shape of the SL-8 are easily recognized on the heavy cruiser Prinz Eugen
  The two Scharnhorst-class battleships Scharnhorst and Gneisenau and the first two Admiral Hipper-class heavy cruisers Admiral Hipper and Blücher received each four SL-6's. Apart from improved yaw stabilization, these directors were the first to have Parallax correction and a spherical shield which protected the operators against weather and shell splinters. The optical rangefinder on the SL-6 had a 4 m base. The Scharnhorst-class battleships were equipped with fourteen 10.5 cm C/33 guns, mounted in seven twin C/31 mountings. Three mountings each were placed very close together on port and starboard, but the seventh was placed at the aft superstructure, just behind the aft main battery turret. The port and starboard batteries had a satisfactory parallax correction, but not the seventh battery. This battery needed an additional parallax corrector which proved unsatisfactory. The Admiral Hipper-class heavy cruisers were equipped with twelve 10.5 cm guns. Since the aft pair of mountings was placed close together, one common parallax point placed between these gun mountings was configured for these guns. The SL-6 weighted 46 tons.
- Both Bismarck-class battleships Bismarck andTirpitz and the third Admiral Hipper-class heavy cruiser Prinz Eugen were equipped with four SL-8's. The SL-8 was basically a SL-6 model where the big, heavy gyroscopes were replaced by small gyroscopes which steered engines driving the sliding weights on the stabilization axes. These small gyroscopes were more precise and could be activated in less than two minutes. The use of small gyroscopes also saved a lot of weight but this was partially nullified by the need to install a 5-ton balast. Total weight was reduced to 40 tons. The Bismarck-class ships were equipped with sixteen 10.5 cm guns, mounted in eight twin mountings. These were grouped in a forward and aft pair on port and starboard. in the middle of each pair there was a parallax point for the gun directors. Only two of the four directors on Bismarck received their full SL-8 equipment, the other two had temporary equipment installed but received no update before the Bismarck was sunk on its first mission. One of the directors on Tirpitz received a Würzburg radar in 1944.

== Evaluation ==
The fact that each gun mounting did not have its own director, the configuration of a parallax point between two near gun mountings, the parallax problem with the Scharnhorst-class aft gun mounting and the fact that Bismarck's forward two pairs of C/31 gun mountings were of a different type than the aft C/37 pair all lead to erroneous explanations about the poor performance of Bismarck's anti-aircraft defense against the attacks by the slow Fairey Swordfish torpedo aircraft. Bercuson&Herwig state that when the C/31 guns fired at the target, the C/37 guns aimed behind the target. Stephen claims the gun directors could not cope with air speeds below 100 mph. Schmalenbach mentions during his explanation of German fire control the presence of many false theories.

The SL was considered a failure: it provided an accurate firing solution but it was too heavy and affected the stability of the ships, and above all it was fragile and broke easily down. Bad weather or a small hit could already cause enough concussion to derail the gimbals and put the director tower out of order.

== Fire Control ==
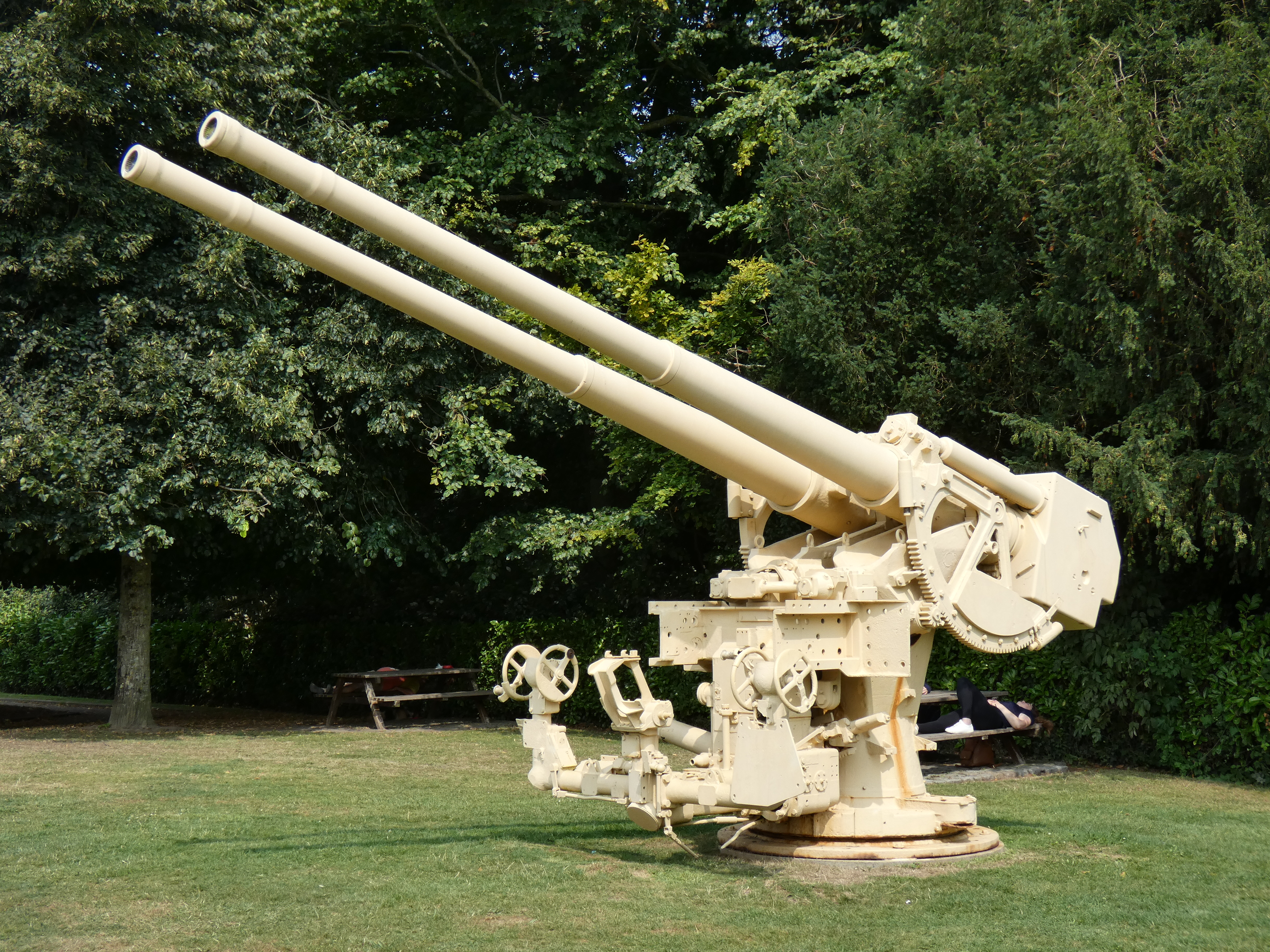
A twin mounting without its protective shield, exposing the positions of the three aimers for the rotation, elevation and cant axis.

A gun has two parameters to be aimed at a target: the angle to rotate the gun mounting and the angle to elevate the barrel. These angles are taken over the horizon, but a ship is not a stable platform. When the gun platform is not horizontal, then the rotation and elevation of the gun have to be compensated. The compensation for the rotation and elevation are called cant angle (German: Kantwinkel) and tilt angle (German: Kippwinkel) respectively. The calculation of there cant could be simplified as long as elevation was limited, which was the case for sea targets but not for airborne targets. A further complication for fire control was that for seaborne targets, the difference between the observed target and the aiming point were much smaller than that for airborne targets. Hence for seaborne targets the cant and tilt compensations were calculated on the target, whilst for airborne targets compensations were calculated on the aiming point. In order to simplify the specific calculations for airborne targets, the Germans decided to introduce a third axis for anti-aircraft batteries: the cant axis. This axis was situated in the horizontal plane in the gun barrel direction. The cant axis allowed the gun elevation to be perpendicular to the horizon, so that the tilt angle was simply the angle towards the horizon. The anti-aircraft gun had as a consequence three aimers: the rotation and elevation aimer had a periscope to track the target in case of undirected fire, but the cant axis aimer just needed a sight to keep his axis perpendicular to the horizon. The fire control solution for airborne targets made it impossible to use it for turret mounted guns.

From the SL-6 onwards, the director was mounted on an inner platform, connected to the outer cylinder stand with the stabilizing gimbal. The director was pointing to the target, the outer cylinder stand was turned by the fire control computer towards the firing angle, so that the cant and tilt angle could be read directly from the gimbals and fed to the guns.

== Other developments ==
- In 1932 the Kriegsmarine was also developing a combination of gun and director in one turret. Such a configuration had many advantages such as shorter signals lines between gun and director, central ammunition feed, protection and taking up less space on deck. However, when fired the smoke blast and vibrations interfered too much with the director equipment and this project was abandoned. When radar promised to solve the smoke problem, the project was picked up again, and it was intended to equip the heavy anti-aircraft defense of the H-class battleships with these turrets. Such a turret needed small gyroscopes which steered the stabilization with motors, not the big gyrostabilizators used in the SL. Once these small gyros became available, they were used in the SL directors.
- The M42 was to become the last version of the SL series. It was a complete redesign with gyro steered engine stabilization. The M42 weighted only 6 tons. It was to become the first director equipped with radar, the FuMo 231. By the end of the war, a few experimental sets were produced but it was not installed on ships.

== See also ==
- HACS
- Mark I Fire Control Computer
- Fuze Keeping Clock
