= HMS Truant =

Submarine of the Royal Navy

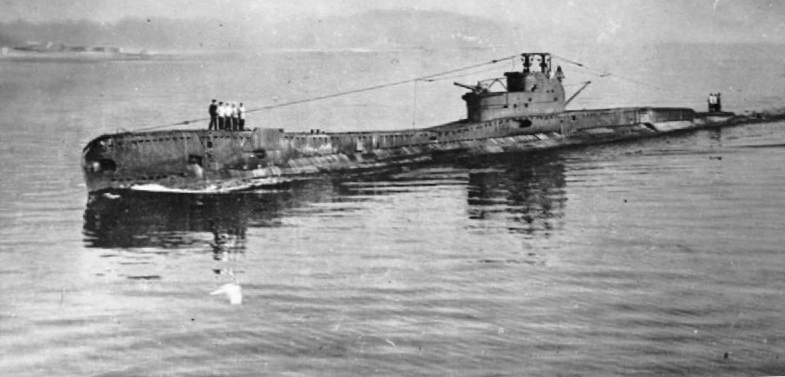
- HMS Truant (N68)

History

United Kingdom
- Builder: Vickers-Armstrongs, Barrow
- Laid down: 24 March 1938
- Launched: 5 May 1939
- Commissioned: 31 October 1939
- Identification: Pennant number: (N68)
- Fate: Sold for breaking up, wrecked under tow December 1946

General characteristics
- Class & type: T-class submarine
- Displacement: 1,090 tons surfaced; 1,575 tons submerged
- Length: 275 ft (84 m)
- Beam: 26 ft 6 in (8.08 m)
- Draught: 16.3 ft (5.0 m)
- Propulsion: Two shafts; Twin diesel engines 2,500 hp (1,900 kW) each; Twin electric motors 1,450 hp (1,080 kW) each
- Speed: 15.25 knots (28.24 km/h; 17.55 mph) surfaced; 9 knots (17 km/h; 10 mph) submerged
- Range: 4,500 nautical miles (8,300 km; 5,200 mi) at 11 knots (20 km/h; 13 mph) surfaced
- Test depth: 300 ft (91 m) max
- Complement: 59
- Armament: 6 × internal forward-facing 21-inch (533 mm) torpedo tubes; 4 × external forward-facing torpedo tubes; 6 × reload torpedoes; 1 × 4-inch (102 mm) deck gun

HMS Truant (N68) was a T-class submarine of the Royal Navy. She was laid down by Vickers-Armstrongs, Barrow and launched on 5 May 1939.

== Career ==
Truant had a relatively active career serving in the main naval theatres of war – Home waters, the Mediterranean, and the Pacific Far East.

=== Home waters ===
Truant's first major victory came when she torpedoed and damaged the German light cruiser Karlsruhe off Kristiansand, Norway, which disabled both engines and power stations. Karlsruhe had to be scuttled with two torpedoes by the German torpedo boat Greif. Truant later attacked the British merchant Alster, unaware that it had been recently captured from the Germans, but her torpedoes missed. She also intercepted the German merchant Tropic Sea. Tropic Sea had formerly been in Norwegian service, but had been captured by the German armed merchant cruiser Orion in the South Pacific. As well as 8,000 tons of wheat, she had on board the captain and 22 survivors of the British SS Haxby, which had been sunk by the raider, as well as her own Norwegian crew. Tropic Sea was scuttled by the German prize crew in the Bay of Biscay. Truant embarked the captain and survivors of Haxby, and the master of Tropic Sea and his wife. The majority of the Norwegians were rescued by British flying boats.

On 24 April 1940 Truant set out to land a group of commandos, among them Peter Kemp (writer), in Norway as part of Operation Knife. She was forced to abort after sustaining damage from a mine.

Truant had a narrow escape when she was attacked by the River-class submarine Clyde, who had mistaken her for an enemy submarine. Clyde's torpedoes missed.

=== Mediterranean ===
Assigned to the Mediterranean in mid 1940, Truant went on to sink a number of enemy ships, including the Italian merchant vessels Providenza, Sebastiano Bianchi and Multedo, the Italian tankers Bonzo and Meteor, the Italian auxiliary submarine chaser Vanna, the Italian passenger/cargo ship Bengasi and the German merchantman Virginia S. Truant also damaged the small Italian tanker Prometeo and the Italian torpedo boat Alcione, which was later declared a total loss. She also unsuccessfully attacked the Italian merchant vessels Utilitas, Silvia Tripcovich, Bainsizza and Arborea, the small Italian tanker Labor and the German merchantman Bellona.

=== Far East ===
Truant was assigned to operate in the Far East, against Japanese shipping in 1942. She was present for the beginning of the Battle of Badung Strait and spotted the Japanese covering force, launching an attack at the light cruiser Nagara scoring two hits though both were duds. She sunk the Japanese merchant ships Yae Maru and Shunsei Maru in the Malacca Strait. She almost sunk a large liner, but held off as poorly displayed hospital markings were spotted (possibly the Hikawa Maru). A few days after she engaged in a gun battle with the Japanese army cargo ship Tamon Maru No.1, which sank shortly after. This was her final patrol as she started to experience engine trouble.

=== Back to home waters ===
By this point Truant was in need of various repairs and refits, and was sent back to the UK, taking part in several exercises en route. Starting in December 1942 her refit was not finished until May 1943. After this she took part in training exercises, with one sortie to hunt for Tirpitz. She was ordered back to the Far East, but on the way her engine troubles flared up again and she returned home. She did not sortie again, instead being used as a trials ship for 1945, including snorkel tests.

== Post-war ==
Truant survived the war and was sold to be broken up for scrap on 19 December 1945. She was wrecked in December 1946 while en route to the shipbreakers.
