= 8.8 cm SK C/31 naval gun =

8.8 cm SK C/31
- Type: Naval gun Anti-aircraft gun
- Place of origin: Germany

Service history
- In service: 1933—45
- Used by: Nazi Germany
- Wars: World War II

Production history
- Designed: 1931–33

Specifications
- Mass: about 4,255 kilograms (9,381 lb)
- Length: about 6.87 meters (22 ft 6 in)
- Barrel length: 6.341 meters (20 ft 9.6 in) (bore length)
- Shell: Fixed
- Shell weight: 9–9.4 kilograms (20–21 lb)
- Caliber: 88 millimeters (3.5 in)
- Breech: vertical sliding-block
- Elevation: -10° to +80°
- Traverse: 360°
- Muzzle velocity: 1,060 m/s (3,500 ft/s)
- Maximum firing range: Horizontal: 17,800 metres (19,500 yd) at 45° Vertical: 13,300 metres (43,600 ft) at +80°

The 8.8 cm SK C/31 (Note: SK - SchiffsKanone (Ship Canone); C - Construktionsjahr (year of design)) was a German naval gun that was used in World War II.

== Description ==
The 8.8 cm SK C/31 gun weighed 4,255 kilograms (9,381 lb), had an overall length of 6.87 meters (22 ft 6 in) and its bore length was 6.341 meters (20 ft 9.6 in). It used a vertical sliding-block breech design. The gun was normally on the twin gun carriage (German: Doppel Lafette or abbreviated Dopp. L) C/31, the mount plus guns weighed 27,300 kilograms (27.3 t). The C/31 mount was later modified to carry the 10.5 cm SK C/33 naval gun. Useful life expectancy was fairly short 1,500 effective full charges (EFC) per barrel.

Only the heavy cruiser (Panzerschiff) Deutschland received the gun, six 8.8 cm SK C/31 were briefly installed, replacing its three obsolete 8.8 cm SK L/45 naval guns, though in 1940 these were again replaced with six 10.5 cm C/33 L/65 guns. Other German capital ships were equipped with a new version of the 8.8 cm gun, the 8.8 cm SK C/32 naval gun which used a shorter shell and were also mounted in a slightly modified carriage, the C/32 which had a slightly larger pivot mount.

=== Ammunition ===
Fixed type ammunition with and without tracer, which weighed 18.5 kg (41 lb), with a projectile length of 1,227.5 mm (48.33 in) was fired. Ammunition Types Available:

- High Explosive (HE) - 9 kg (20 lb)
- Illumination (ILLUM) - 9.4 kg (21 lb)

== See also ==
- List of naval guns
