= 8.8 cm SK C/32 naval gun =

8.8 cm SK C/32
- 8.8 cm SK C/32 at the Fort Pallice of Marine-Artillerie-Abteilung 282
- Type: Naval gun Anti-aircraft gun
- Place of origin: Germany

Service history
- In service: 1933−45
- Used by: Nazi Germany; Spain
- Wars: World War II

Production history
- Designed: 1932−34
- Variants: SKC/32in

Specifications
- Mass: 3,640 kilograms (8,020 lb)
- Length: 6.69 meters (21 ft 11 in)
- Barrel length: 6.341 meters (20 ft 9.6 in) (bore length)
- Shell: Fixed
- Shell weight: 9–9.4 kilograms (20–21 lb)
- Caliber: 88 millimeters (3.5 in)
- Breech: vertical sliding-block
- Elevation: -10° to +80°
- Traverse: 360°
- Rate of fire: 15-20 RPM
- Muzzle velocity: 950 m/s (3,100 ft/s)
- Maximum firing range: Horizontal: 17,200 metres (18,800 yd) at 45° Vertical: 12,400 metres (40,700 ft) at 80°

The 8.8 cm SK C/32 (Note: SK - Schnelladekanone (quick loading cannon); C - Construktionsjahr (year of design)) was a German naval gun that was used in World War II.

== Description ==
The 8.8 cm SK C/32 was a gun of modest performance with a shorter chamber which fired a shorter shell. The SK C/32 had a loose one-part barrel with vertical sliding-block breech design. It was designed to replace the older 8.8 cm SK L/45 naval guns on German light cruisers. The SK C/32in variant of the gun had a loose two-part barrel with vertical sliding-block and was carried on a modified twin 10.5 cm Dopp L C/37 mounting and was intended for the unbuilt M-class cruiser.

All three of the Königsberg-class cruisers and the light cruiser Leipzig had their single mount 8.8 cm SK L/45 replaced with the 8.8 cm SK C/32 mounted in C/32 twin mounts (German: Doppel Lafette or abbreviated Dopp. L). The light cruiser Nürnberg and the heavy cruiser Admiral Scheer were equipped with this gun when being built. It was also original equipment on the Spanish cruiser Navarra.

=== Ammunition ===
Fixed type ammunition with and without tracer, which weighed 15.2 kilograms (34 lb) and was 93.2 centimetres (36.7 in) long. Ammunition Types Available:

- High Explosive (HE) - 9 kg (20 lb)
- Illumination (ILLUM) - 9.4 kg (21 lb)

== See also ==
- List of naval guns
