= 15 cm SK C/25 =

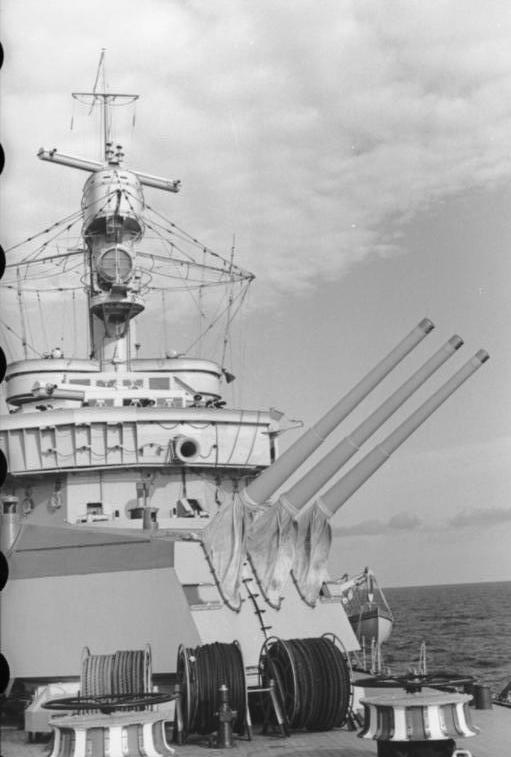
- 15 cm SK C/25 in Drh LC/35 turret on Nürnberg
- Type: Naval gun
- Place of origin: Weimar Republic

Service history
- In service: 1929–45
- Used by: Weimar Republic; Nazi Germany
- Wars: Second World War

Specifications
- Mass: 11,970 kilograms (26,390 lb)
- Length: 9.08 metres (29.8 ft)
- Barrel length: 8.57 metres (28.1 ft)
- Shell: separate-loading, cased charge
- Caliber: 149.1 millimetres (5.87 in)
- Breech: semi-automatic, vertical sliding-block
- Elevation: -10° to +40°
- Traverse: 360°
- Rate of fire: 8 rpm (maximum)
- Muzzle velocity: 960 metres per second (3,100 ft/s)
- Maximum firing range: 25,700 metres (28,100 yd) at 40°

The 15 cm SK C/25 (Note: SK - Schnelladekanone (quick loading cannon); C - Construktionsjahr (year of design)) was a German medium-caliber naval gun used during the Second World War. It served as the primary armament for the Königsberg class and Leipzig-class cruisers. No surplus weapons of this type appear to have been used as coast-defense guns.

== Description ==
This gun was the most powerful of the Kriegsmarine's 15 centimetres (5.9 in) guns and was designed with a loose barrel, jacket and breech-piece with a vertical sliding breech block.

=== Mount ===
The Drh. LC/25 triple-gun mount was the only mount used for this gun in the Kriegsmarine. The mount weighed between 136.91–147.15 tonnes (134.75–144.83 long tons; 150.92–162.21 short tons), depending on its armor thickness; the Nürnberg's mounts had between 20–80 mm (0.79–3.15 in) of armor while the other ships had 20–30 mm (0.79–1.18 in). Each mount was designed for full 360° of traverse, but was limited to much less than that by the ship's superstructure. The electrically powered hydraulic pumps had a maximum elevating speed of 8° per second, while train was a maximum of 6-8° per second. The maximum firing cycle was 7.5 seconds, or 8 rounds per minute, despite being hand-loaded and rammed. Ammunition was supplied by three hoists, one between the left and center guns and the other two between center and right guns at the rear of the mount.

=== Ammunition ===
The SK C/25 had a number of different shells available.

Shell name	Weight	Filling Weight	Muzzle velocity
base-fused HE shell with ballistic cap (Sprenggranate L/4.5 m Bdz m. Hb)	45.5 kg (100 lb)	3.058 kg (6.74 lb)	960 m/s (3,100 ft/s)
nose-fused HE shell with ballistic cap (15 cm Spgr. L/4.4 Kz m. Hb)	45.5 kg (100 lb)	3.892 kg (8.58 lb)	960 m/s (3,100 ft/s)
base-fused armor-piercing shell with ballistic cap (Panzer-Sprenggranate) L/3.7 m Bdz. m Hb)	45.5 kg (100 lb)	.885 kg (1.95 lb)	960 m/s (3,100 ft/s)
illumination shell	41 kg (90 lb)	Unknown	650 m/s (2,100 ft/s)
