= 8.8 cm SK L/45 naval gun =

8.8 cm SK L/45
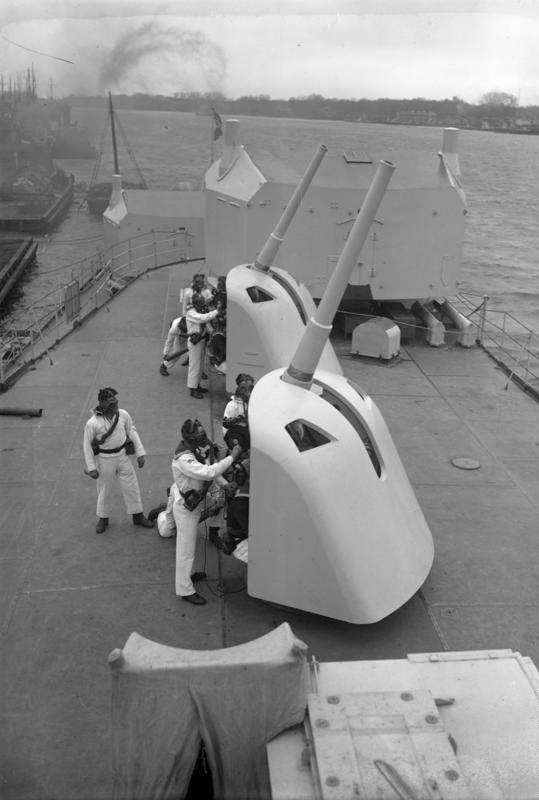
- Anti-aircraft guns on light cruiser Königsberg, 1932
- Type: Naval gun Anti-aircraft gun
- Place of origin: German Empire

Service history
- In service: 1905–1945
- Used by: See § Users
- Wars: World War I World War II

Production history
- Designer: Krupp
- Designed: 1905
- Manufacturer: Krupp
- Variants: See § Versions

Specifications
- Mass: ~2,500 kg (5,510 lb)
- Barrel length: ~4 m (13.12 ft)
- Shell: Fixed QF
- Shell weight: 9–10 kg (19.84–22.05 lb)
- Caliber: 88 mm (3.5 in)
- Breech: Vertical sliding-wedge
- Elevation: MPL C/06: −10° / +25°; TbtsL C/13: −10° / +25°; MPL C/13: −10° / +70°
- Rate of fire: 15 rounds/min
- Muzzle velocity: 650 to 890 m/s (2,130 to 2,920 ft/s)
- Maximum firing range: Horizontal: 10,694 m (11,695 yd) at +25°; 14,100 m (15,420 yd) at +43°; Vertical: 9,150 m (30,020 ft) at +70°

The 8.8 cm SK L/45 (SK - Schnelladekanone (quick loading cannon) L - Länge (with a 45-caliber barrel)) was a German naval gun that was used in World War I and World War II on a variety of mounts.

== Description ==
The 8.8 cm SK L/45 gun weighed 2.5 metric tons (2.5 long tons; 2.8 short tons) and had an overall length of about 4 meters (13 ft 1 in). It used a vertical sliding-block, or "wedge", as it is sometimes referred to, breech design.

== History ==
During World War I, the SK L/45 was used as anti-torpedo boat guns on all Imperial German Navy dreadnoughts and as main guns on torpedo boats and destroyers. The SK L/45 was also used to replace some of the 8.8 cm SK L/35 anti-torpedo boat guns on pre-dreadnought battleships.

With the growing threat of aircraft, Krupp developed a high angle mount for the gun with a protective shield, known as the SK L/45 MPL C/13. The anti-aircraft gun was first installed on the battlecruiser Derfflinger and eventually all German capital ships had their 8.8 cm anti-torpedo guns completely or partially replaced with a smaller number of the 8.8 cm anti-aircraft gun. This gun became not only the standard anti-aircraft gun on ships, but was also extensively used on every possible place where fixed anti-aircraft defence was needed.

After World War I, the Treaty of Versailles imposed many restrictions on the German Reichsmarine and no new anti-aircraft gun could be developed before 1931. As a result, the new light cruiser Emden, the three Königsberg-class cruisers and the heavy cruiser Deutschland were equipped by the now completely obsolete 8.8 cm SK L/45 C/13. Eventually these guns were replaced by the new 8.8 cm SK C/31 naval gun, 8.8 cm SK C/32 naval gun or the 10.5 cm Flak 38, with most ships being refitted by 1939.

During the 1930s surviving SK L/45 guns were modified to use the same ammunition as the 8.8 cm SK C/30 naval gun and had similar performance.

== Versions ==
- 8.8 cm SK L/45 naval gun in MPL C/06 and MPL C/13 mountings
- 8.8 cm Flak L/45 anti-aircraft gun in MPL C/13 mounting
- 8.8 cm TbtsK L/45 torpedo boat gun in TbtsL C/13 mounting

== Users ==
- German Empire
- Weimar Republic
- Nazi Germany
- Ottoman Empire

== Ammunition ==
Fixed type ammunition with and without tracer, which weighed 15 kg (33 lb), with a projectile length of 355 mm (14.0 in) was fired. Ammunition Types Available:

- Armor Piercing (AP) - 10 kg (22 lb)
- High Explosive (HE) - 9 kg (20 lb)
- High Explosive Incendiary (HEI) - 9.5 kg (21 lb)
- Illumination (ILLUM) - 9.4 kg (21 lb)

== 75 mm FRC M27 ==
75 mm FRC M27
- Type: Anti-aircraft gun
- Place of origin: Belgium

Service history
- In service: 1927 – 1945
- Used by: Belgium; Nazi Germany
- Wars: World War II

Production history
- Designer: Krupp
- Designed: 1913
- Manufacturer: Fonderie Royale des Canons (FRC)
- Produced: 1927
- No. built: 60

Specifications
- Mass: Transport: 8,027 kg (17,697 lb); In action: 7,930 kg (17,480 lb)
- Barrel length: 3.9 m (12.80 ft) L/52
- Shell: Fixed QF 75×518mmR
- Shell weight: 6.44 kg (14.20 lb)
- Caliber: 75 mm (2.95 in)
- Action: Semi-automatic
- Breech: Vertical sliding-wedge
- Carriage: Dual-axle flatbed road carriage; Railroad flatcar
- Elevation: 0° / +70°
- Traverse: 360°
- Muzzle velocity: 700 m/s (2,300 ft/s)
- Effective firing range: Vertical ceiling: 6,500 m (21,300 ft)
- Maximum firing range: Vertical ceiling: 7,500 m (24,600 ft) to 8,000 m (26,200 ft)

The 75 mm FRC M27 was a Belgian anti-aircraft gun built after the World War I and used during World War II.

The origins of the FRC M27 lie in the German Krupp 8.8 cm SK L/45 naval gun of 1913. In addition to its role aboard warships of the Imperial German Navy, it was also used as a shore based anti-aircraft gun and coastal artillery during the First World War. The Belgians obtained a number of these guns either when the Germans retreated or as reparations following Germany's defeat during the First World War.

The barrels were lined down to 75 mm by the Fonderie Royale des Canons (FRC) in 1927. The guns were given a muzzle brake and mounted on a shielded, high angle mount on either a dual-axle flatbed road carriage with side platforms for the operators and outriggers to stabilize the gun in its firing position (sometimes it was mounted on a railroad flatcar). Cartridges were equipped with a time fuse head set before firing.

Those weapons captured after the German occupation of Belgium in 1940 were taken into Wehrmacht service as the 7.5 cm Flak(b).

== See also ==
- List of naval guns

== Main sources ==
- Die 8,8 cm Flugzeugabwehrkanone L/45 (8,8 cm Flak. L/45) in 8,8 cm Mittel-Pivot-Lafette C/1913 (8,8 cm M.P.L.C./1913). Berlin: E. S. Mittler. 1918. OCLC 635259544.
- Campbell, John (2002). Naval Weapons of World War Two. London: Conway Maritime Press. ISBN 0-87021-459-4.
- DiGiulian, Tony (February 6, 2021). "8.8 cm/45 (3.46") SK L/45". NavWeaps. Naval Weapons, Naval Technology and Naval Reunions. Archived from the original on August 12, 2022.
- Friedman, Norman (2011). Naval Weapons of World War One: Guns, Torpedoes, Mines and ASW Weapons of All Nations (An Illustrated Directory). Barnsley: Seaforth Publishing. ISBN 978-1-84832-100-7.
- M. Dv. Nr. 170,16: Merkbuch über die Munition für die 8,8 cm SK L/45 (nachgebohrte Rohre), 8,8 cm Flak L/45 (nachgebohrte Rohre), 8,8 cm SK C/30, 8,8 cm SK C/30 U, 8,8 cm Flak 18 M, 8,8 cm Flak 36 M und 8,8 cm KM 41 der Schiffs- und Marine-Küstenartillerie (in German). Berlin: Oberkommando der Kriegsmarine. 1941.
- Schmalenbach, Paul (1993). Die Geschichte der deutschen Schiffsartillerie (in German) (3rd ed.). Herford: Koehler. ISBN 3-7822-0577-4.
- Stehr, Werner F.G.; Breyer, Siegfried (1999). Leichte und mitlere Artillerie auf deutschen Kriegsschiffen. Marine-Arsenal (in German). Vol. Sonderheft band 18. Wölfersheim-Berstadt: Podzun Pallas. ISBN 3-7909-0664-6.

== Secondary sources ==
- Chamberlain, Peter; Gander, Terry (1975). Anti-aircraft guns. New York: Arco Pub. Co. ISBN 0668038187. OCLC 2000222.
- Chamberlain, Peter; Gander, Terry (1979). Weapons of the Third Reich: An Encyclopedic Survey of All Small Arms, Artillery and Special Weapons of the German Land Forces 1939–1945. New York: Doubleday. ISBN 0-385-15090-3.
- Hogg, Ian V. (1997). German Artillery of World War Two (2nd corrected ed.). Mechanicsville, PA: Stackpole Books. ISBN 1-85367-480-X.
- Rolf, Rudi (1998). Der Atlantikwall: Bauten der deutschen Küstenbefestigungen 1940–1945. Osnabrück: Biblio. ISBN 3-7648-2469-7.
- Rolf, Rudi (2004). A Dictionary on Modern Fortification: An Illustrated Lexicon on European Fortification in the Period 1800–1945. Middleburg, Netherlands: PRAK.

== Other sources ==
- Lothaire, Roger. Artillerie Antiaérienne belge 1914-1940 [Belgian Anti-Aircraft Artillery 1914-1940] (in French). Éditions du Patrimoine Militaire. ISBN 9-782930-813097.
- "Armata przeciwlotnicza Canon anti-aérien de 75 mm FRC Mle 1927" [Canon anti-aircraft gun 75 mm FRC Mle 1927]. dws-xip.com (in Polish).
