= Bordfliegergruppe 196 =

Shipboard Air Group 196
- Bordfliegergruppe 196
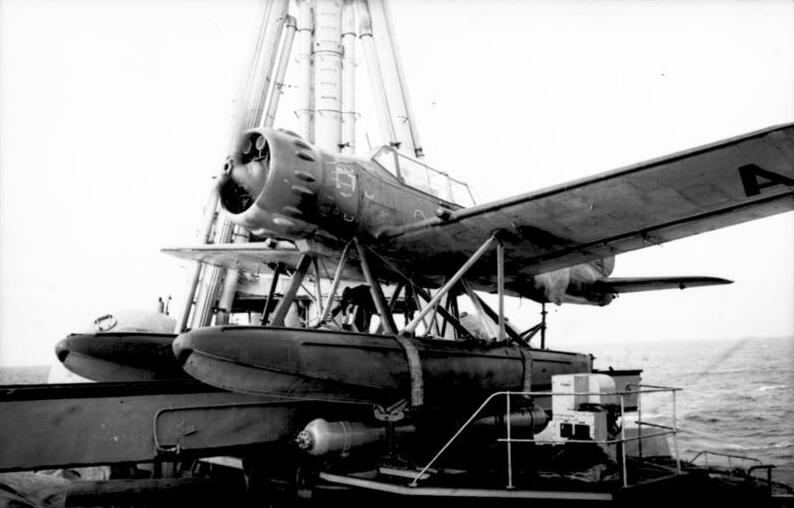
- Arado Ar 196 aboard the Admiral Hipper
- Active: October 1937 - March 1945
- Disbanded: March 1945
- Country: Nazi Germany
- Branch: Luftwaffe
- Role: Maritime reconnaissance
- Size: Group
- Major bases: Wilhelmshaven; Kiel-Holtenau; Aalborg; Pillau; Rügen
- Engagements: World War II

Commanders
- Commander (1943-1944): Gerrit Wiegmink

Aircraft flown
- Patrol: Heinkel He 60; Arado Ar 196

Bordfliegergruppe 196 (Shipboard Air Group) was a unit of the Luftwaffe (German Air Force) founded in 1937 and disbanded in 1945. Initially created as a Gruppe (group) composed of two Staffelen (squadrons) two further squadrons and a Stab (staff unit) would be added as the group played a role in World War II, providing aircraft for service aboard the Kriegsmarine (German Navy) surface combatants.

== History ==
During World War I, the Kaiserliche Marine (Imperial German Navy) had maintained its own aviation service, the Marine-Fliegerabteilung (Naval Air Unit), but this was disbanded upon the signing of the Versailles Treaty, which banned all military aviation in the country as a way of preventing Germany from again becoming a threat to make war on the victorious Allies. Technological developments in naval aviation after the war made it clear that incorporating aircraft into naval operations would be an important part of becoming a credible world-class navy. After the rise to power of the Nazi Party, Germany began a major re-armament effort, forgoing the previous limitations on its military armaments. The Kriegsmarine's new cruisers and pocket battleships were equipped with catapults designed to launch floatplanes for scouting and defense, and new aircraft were developed in the country to meet this need.

As the Kriegsmarine was rebuilding its fleet, so too was the Luftwaffe building itself. Under Hermann Göring's Reichsluftfahrtministerium (RLM/German Air Ministry) the Luftwaffe had complete authority over all aircraft, and such was the breadth of this authority that even aircraft aboard Kriegsmarine ships were to be flown and maintained by Luftwaffe personnel, although Kriegsmarine officers served as commander/observer on operational flights. Thus, it fell to the Luftwaffe to organize units to provide aircraft for the Kriegsmarine ships. The first aircraft were provided from the coastal reconnaissance squadrons which used similar floatplanes, but by 1936 it was clear that a more specialized unit was warranted and in April the Luftwaffe planned the creation of a Flottenfliegergruppe (Fleet Air Group) with seven Staffelen (squadrons) which would support the various naval bases and catapult-equipped ships present at them. The name was changed to Bordfliegergruppe the following year as plans were expanded to three groups, each of three front line and one reserve squadron. The wing number 196 was assigned at that time as well, but this would merely be used as a designation, however, as the actual command structure and staff was not formed until 1943 when the unit was officially established as Bordfliegergruppe 196 (BoFlGr 196). Despite initial plans, several of the proposed squadrons never materialized and the unit was never large enough to be designated a Geschwader (Wing)

=== Group organization and staff ===
The first attempt to provide a unit structure for the squadrons was the brief establishment in October 1937 of two Gruppen (Groups). I./BoFlGr 196 (1st Shipboard Air Group) was formed at Wilhelmshaven, taking command of the 1./BoFlGr (1st Squadron) based there, and would remain there until its dissolution in May 1941. The group was originally planned to have four squadrons, the 2nd and 3rd squadrons were not formed until after the group was dissolved, and the 4th squadron, intended as a reserve, never got past the planning stages. I./196 essentially served as a group command for its existence. II Embarked Air Group (II./196) existed briefly in 1937. Forme along with I./196, it was to take responsibility for the Coastal Reconnaissance Squadron 1./406 which became 5./196. It too had additional units planned, but these did not get past the planning stages, and the group was never truly established, officially being dropped in October 1940.

From the dissolution of the groups, 1st and 5th Squadrons continued to operate under the 196 designation through the first half of the war. After the transfer of the 5th Squadron to Coastal Reconnaissance Group 126, the organization was revamped, and the actual Embarked Air Group 196 was formed on 1 August 1943 under the command of Major Gerrit Wiegmink at Aalborg, Denmark. Taking command of the 1st Squadron (1./BoFlGr 196), the group rapidly established the 2nd and 3rd Squadrons by September. The Group's staff unit (Stab/BFGr. 196) was initially equipped with a single Junkers W 34 for general use. This was replaced in June 1944 by a pair of Ar 196 A-5 float planes to match the equipment of its squadrons. Group headquarters moved to Pillau from June through August 1944, returning to Aalborg until a final move in January 1945 to Rügen. After the dissolution of 2nd and 3rd Squadrons, the BFGr. 196 was disbanded in March 1945, followed by the official disbandment of the group in April.

=== 1st Squadron ===
Formed from the 2nd Squadron of Coastal Reconnaissance Group 116, the 1st Fleet Air Squadron (German: 1. Flottenfliegerstaffel) was established on 1 April 1936 at Norderney under the command of Captain Heinrich Minner. Initial equipment was the Heinkel He 60 biplane, though a number of elderly Heinkel He 42 aircraft were on strength for training use. Soon after establishment, the squadron was renamed the 1st Embarked Air Squadron (German: 1. Bordfliegerstaffel) and the following year it was again changed to Embarked Air Squadron 1/196 (German: Bordfliegerstaffel 1/196) upon assignment of the group identifier. 1937 also saw the squadron move to its permanent home at Wilhelmshaven, where it would remain for most of the war. During the war, detachments were sent to numerous locations throughout occupied Europe, including Aalborg, Brest, Trondheim, List auf Sylt, Palermo, Pillau, Schellingwoude, Stavanger, and Thisted. The squadron moved to Norway for a year and then to the Baltic coast later in the war.

=== 5th Squadron ===
The 5th Squadron (5./196) was formed at Kiel, both equipped with the Heinkel He 60 floatplane. At the start of the war, the group was re-equipped with Arado Ar 196 floatplanes which would remain the unit's equipment through the war.

5th Squadron was deployed to Denmark and Norway in 1940 and then spent most of the war in France supporting Navy ships based in French ports. In mid-1943, the squadron was transferred to Maritime Reconnaissance Group 128 (German: Seeaufklärungsgruppe 128) as its 1st Squadron (1./SAGr. 128), reflecting the demise of Germany's surface fleet and the heavy use of the Ar 196 aircraft in coastal patrol and rescue missions, but would be dissolved in January 1944. The unit's remnants were reformed into 8th Squadron, Zerstörergeschwader 1 with Junkers Ju 88 night fighters, a squadron which would ultimately be withdrawn to Germany and equipped with Messerschmitt Bf 109 single-engine fighters for home air defense as part of Jagdgeschwader 4.

=== 2nd and 3rd Squadrons ===
For a brief period after the departure of 5th Squadron, the group consisted solely of its 1st Squadron, then based at Stavanger-Sola. However, the 2nd Squadron (2./196) was quickly raised at Kiel on 8 August 1943 and sent to Venice-Lido Airport to support efforts in the Mediterranean Sea. The 2nd would remain in Venice until its disbandment on 3 June 1944. Soon after the formation of the 2nd Squadron, a staff unit was founded as Stab/196 on 1 September 1943 at Aalborg Airport in Denmark, and the following month the 3rd Squadron was stood up at Kiel.

== Bases ==
Major base assignments for staff and squadrons of Embarked Air Group 196
| Month | Stab | 1st Squadron | 2nd Squadron | 3rd Squadron | 5th Squadron |
|---|---|---|---|---|---|
| October 1937 | | Wilhelmshaven | | | Kiel |
| April 1940 | | Wilhelmshaven | | | Aalborg |
| June 1940 | | Wilhelmshaven | | | Trondheim |
| September 1940 | | Wilhelmshaven | | | Cherbourg |
| April 1941 | | Wilhelmshaven | | | Hourtin |
| January 1942 | | Brest | | | Hourtin |
| April 1943 | | Stavanger | | | Hourtin |
| June 1943 | | Stavanger | | | |
| August 1943 | | Stavanger | Venice | | |
| September 1943 | Aalborg | Stavanger | Venice | | |
| October 1943 | Aalborg | Stavanger | Venice | Kiel | |
| March 1944 | Aalborg | Stavanger | Venice | Pillau | |
| June 1944 | Pillau | Pillau | Venice | Aalborg | |
| July 1944 | Pillau | Pillau | | Aalborg | |
| October 1944 | Rügen | Rügen | | Rügen | |

== Aircraft ==
Upon foundation, both squadrons of the group were issued the Heinkel He 60. This was a sturdy, utilitarian biplane, but under-powered for its size even at the time of its initial production. The planned replacement for it, the Heinkel He 114 was scarcely an improvement on the He 60, and BFGr. 196 did not receive any. Instead, both squadrons received the far more successful Arado Ar 196, which would be the only aircraft used by the group through World War II.
