= Arado Ar 95 =

German single-engine reconnaissance floatplane

Ar 95
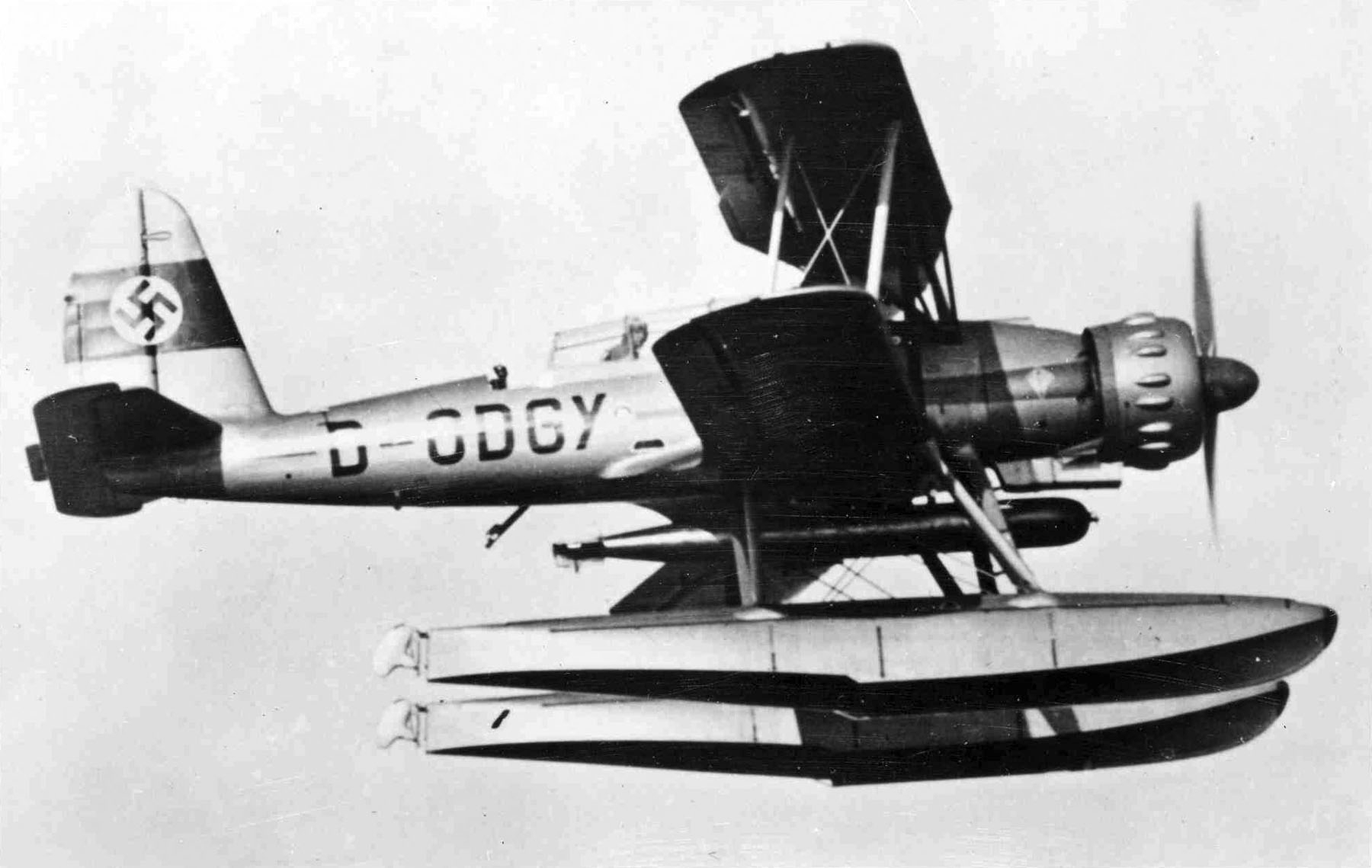

General information
- Type: Reconnaissance biplane
- Manufacturer: Arado
- Primary users: Chile Kriegsmarine
- Number built: 42

History
- First flight: 3 December 1936
- Variant: Arado Ar 195

The Arado Ar 95 was a single-engine reconnaissance and patrol biplane designed and produced by the German aircraft manufacturer Arado.

During the mid 1930s, the Reichsluftfahrtministerium (RLM/German Aviation Ministry) sought a replacement for the Heinkel He 60 floatplanes operated by the Kriegsmarine (German Navy). Arado opted to design the Ar 95 with the intention of fulfilling this requirement. While the competing Heinkel He 114 was selected, the RLM encouraged the company to continue work on the aircraft. Furthermore, six aircraft were dispatched overseas with the Legion Condor and thus saw action during the Spanish Civil War. The Ar 95 also selected as the basis for the Ar 195 carrier-based torpedo bomber intended for the Kriegsmarine's future aircraft carriers.

Opting to focus on export opportunities for the aircraft, Arado produced two distinct versions, the Ar 95W floatplane and the Ar 95L landplane, which had a fixed undercarriage. The company was able to secure orders from both Chile and Turkey. However, the latter would not receive their Ar 95s as a consequence of the outbreak of the Second World War; instead, they were taken over by the Kriegsmarine and used as trainers and coastal patrol aircraft off the coast of Latvia and Estonia as well as in the Gulf of Finland. Despite being built in relative low numbers, German Ar 95s continued to be operated up until late 1944. Spain continued to operate at least one of its Ar 95s as late as 1948.

== Development ==
=== Background ===
During the mid-1930s, several German aircraft manufacturers embarked on biplane aircraft that would be suited to performing multiple roles and operational environments, including as floatplanes, trainers, and fighter aircraft. These efforts were heavily connected with Nazi Germany's expansion of the Kriegsmarine (German Navy), which was a key customer for such aircraft. By early 1935, it was determined that the Kriegsmarine's existing fleet of Heinkel He 60 floatplanes was lacking in performance, thus the Reichsluftfahrtministerium sought out a suitable successor to replace it.

Arado opted to design and submit their own two-seat seaplane, designated Ar 95. It was designed to perform various missions, including coastal patrol, aerial reconnaissance, artillery spotting, target-towing, as well as torpedo and bomber attacks. The design team was headed by Arado's chief engineer, the aeronautical engineer Walter Blume. He opted to produce a relatively compact all-metal aircraft, being largely composed of duralumin, that was suited to the challenging maritime environment. The Ar 95 was equipped with foldable wings to ease storage requirements as well as to perform catapult launches. Furthermore, the Ar 95's configuration was validated to conform with modern standards as per the RLM's requirements.

The fuselage featured a monocoque construction, the wing centre section being joined to the fuselage via its continuous spars. The wings were of an all-metal construction, although a fabric covering was present on the underside of the wing. The tailplane and fin were composed of lightweight metals and employed cantilever construction. All control surfaces were counterbalanced, although only the horizontal stabiliser could be trimmed mid-flight. The ailerons and vertical stabiliser could be adjusted on the ground. Two separate compartments for stowing equipment were present just forward of the pilot's cockpit, which were externally accessible via their own hatches. An observer's compartment was beneath the cockpit that comprised the entire height of the fuselage and could readily accommodate two people. Fuel was also accommodated beneath the cockpit.

=== Into flight ===
The first prototype (D-OLUO), an all-metal biplane powered by a BMW 132 radial engine, performed its maiden flight on 3 December 1936. It was followed by a second prototype, which was powered by a Junkers Jumo 210 liquid-cooled engine. The two prototypes were evaluated against the similar Focke-Wulf Fw 62. The BMW-powered version was considered worthy of further study, and a batch of six was sent for further evaluation with the Legion Condor, and thus flew active combat missions during the Spanish Civil War.

The third prototype was the first to be fitted with a three-blade metal variable-pitch propeller along with an automated RPM control system; it was also the first model outfitted to be operated by a crew of three, comprising a pilot, gunner, and radio operator/observer. The fourth prototype was configured as a land-based aircraft, being equipped with fixed landing gear that housed fuel within its spats. The RLM were reportedly interested in operating a land-based model, but ultimately chose not to procure it, allegedly due to it not achieving performance expectations.

Even prior to the start of flight testing, it had become increasingly clear that the RLM favoured a rival submission, the Heinkel He 114, yet the ministry still encouraged development to continue, albeit with alterations that would make it better suited as a universal naval aircraft suitable for export customers. Furthermore, German officials advocated for a derivative that would be suited to the torpedo bomber role that could be operated from the under-construction German aircraft carrier Graf Zeppelin; the resulting aircraft was designated Ar 195.

== Operational history ==
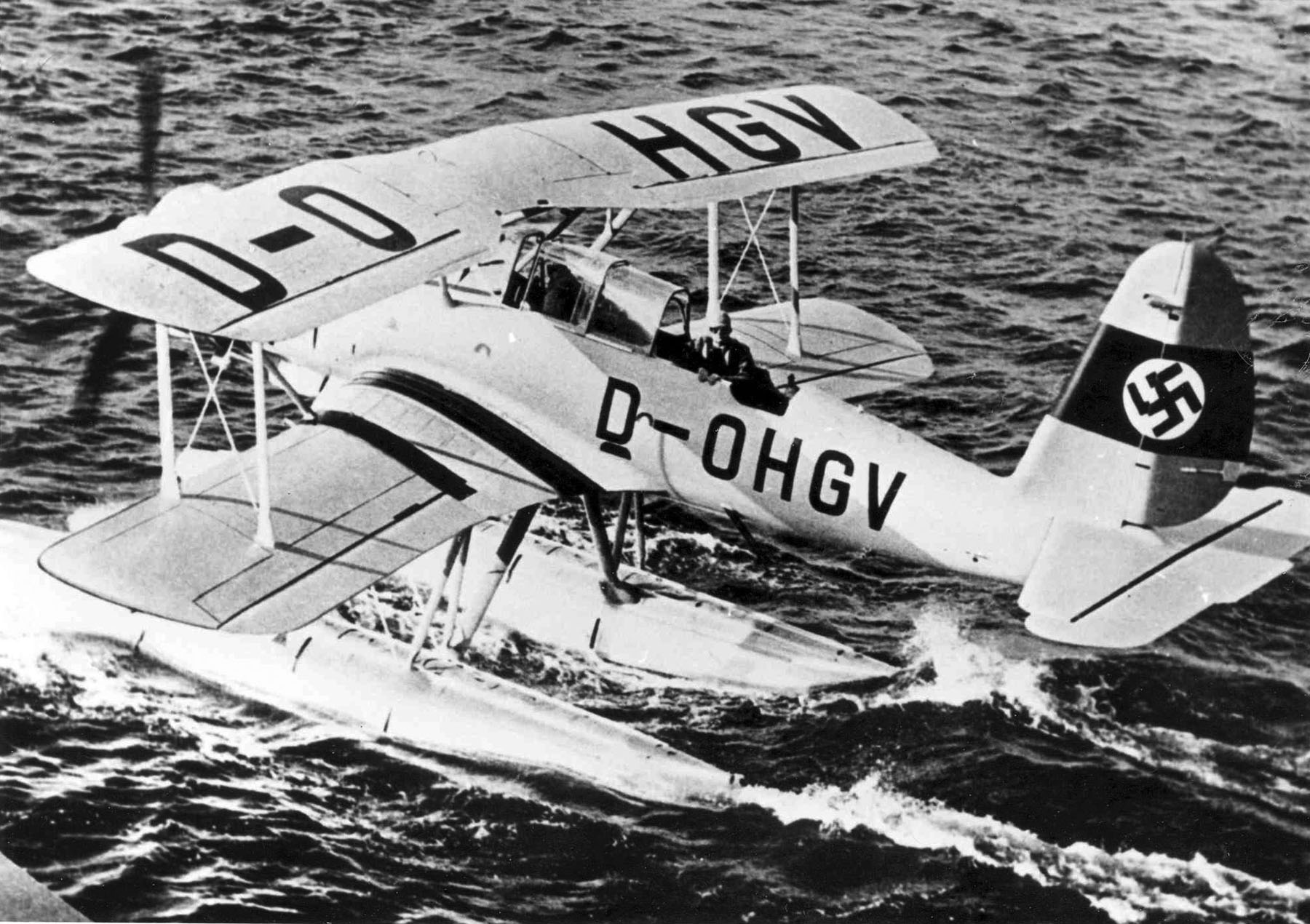
Arado Ar 95

The Ar 95 was not ordered by the German armed forces, and so was offered for export in two versions, the Ar 95W floatplane and Ar 95L landplane, the latter featuring a fixed, spatted undercarriage. During late 1938, an Ar 95 was lost in a fatal accident, killing test pilot Graf Resseguier, while attempting to perform a snap roll in spite of restrictions during a demonstration flight to visiting officials from Chile. Nevertheless, six Ar 95Ls were ordered by the Chilean Air Force, they were delivered prior to the start of the Second World War. Turkey also placed an order for Ar 95Ws, however, none were delivered as these aircraft were instead taken over by Germany at the outbreak of the conflict.

These requisitioned Ar 95s were designated by the Luftwaffe as the Ar 95A-1, and served with Seeaufklärungsgruppe (SAGr/Naval Reconnaissance Group) 125, 126 or 127, mainly around the Baltic Sea. The type lasted longer in Spanish service, being operational as late as 1948.

== Operators ==
Chile

- Chilean Air Force

Germany

- Luftwaffe

Spain

- Spanish Air Force

== Specifications (Arado 95A-1) ==
Data from Warplanes of the Luftwaffe Arado, History of an Aircraft Company

General characteristics

- Crew: 2
- Length: 11.10 m (36 ft 5 in)
- Wingspan: 12.50 m (41 ft 0 in)
- Height: 3.60 m (11 ft 10 in)
- Wing area: 45.40 m^{2} (488.7 sq ft)
- Empty weight: 1,111 kg (2,450 lb)
- Max takeoff weight: 3,560 kg (7,848 lb)
- Powerplant: 1 × BMW 132De air-cooled nine-cylinder radial engine, 656 kW (880 hp)

Performance

- Maximum speed: 310 km/h (190 mph, 170 kn) at 3,000 m (9,800 ft)
- Cruise speed: 255 km/h (158 mph, 138 kn) at 1,200 m (3,900 ft)
- Range: 1,100 km (680 mi, 590 nmi)
- Service ceiling: 7,300 m (24,000 ft)
- Rate of climb: 7.5 m/s (1,480 ft/min)

Armament

- Guns: 1 × fixed, forward-firing 7.92 mm (.312 in) MG 17 machine gun and 1 × flexible 7.92 (.312 in) MG 15 machine gun in rear cockpit
- Bombs: 1 × 800 kg (1,764 lb) torpedo or 500 kg (1,102 lb) bomb on underfuselage rack

== See also ==
Related development

- Arado Ar 195

Related lists

- List of Interwar military aircraft
- List of seaplanes and flying boats
