= Focke-Wulf Fw 62 =

1937 German reconnaissance floatplane

Fw 62
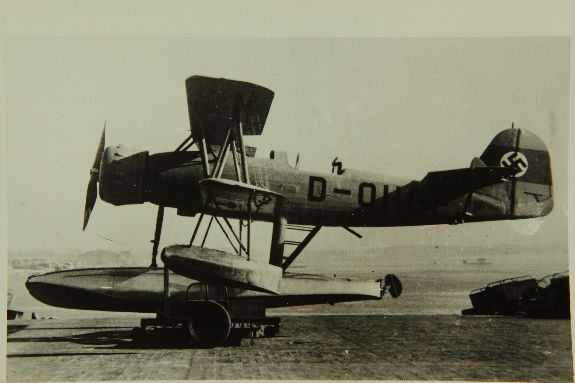
- The Fw 62 V2 with single main float

General information
- Type: Reconnaissance floatplane
- National origin: Germany
- Manufacturer: Focke-Wulf
- Designer: Erich Arbeitlang
- Number built: 4

History
- First flight: 23 October 1937

The Focke-Wulf Fw 62 was a reconnaissance floatplane, designed and built by Focke-Wulf for use by Nazi Germany's Kriegsmarine. Only four were built.

== Design and development ==
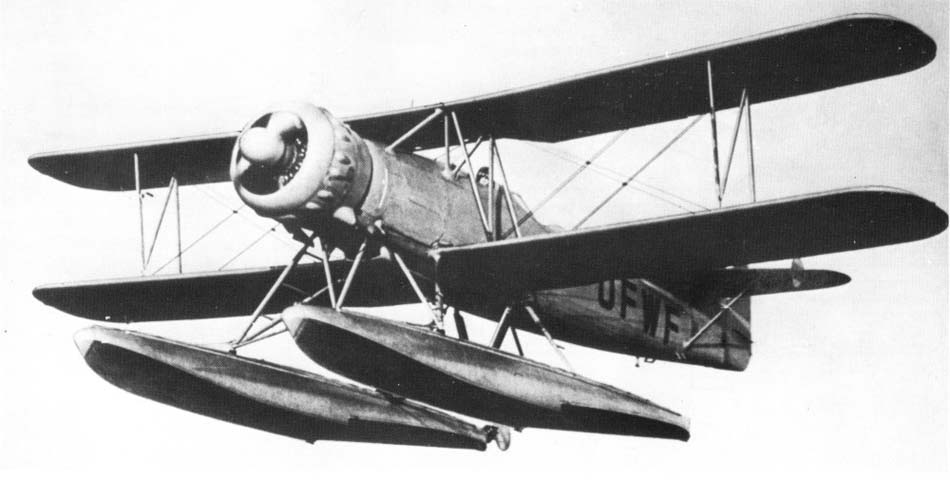
Fw 62 V1

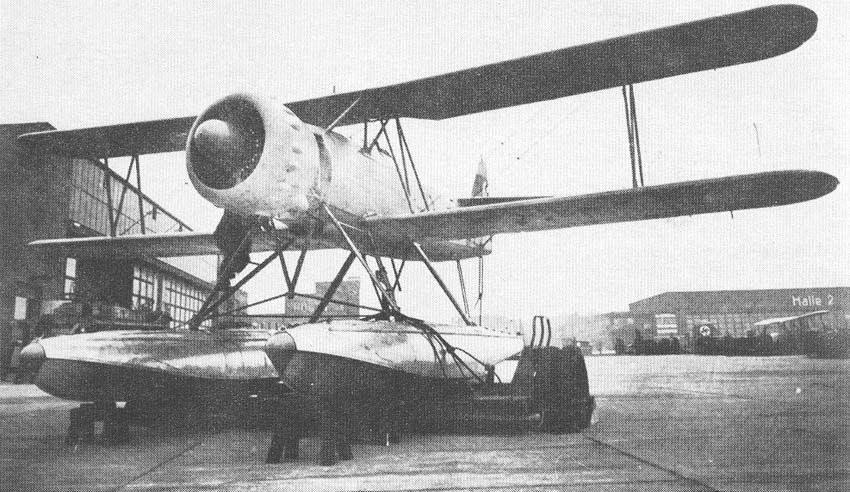
Fw 62 V1 on its beaching gear

In 1936 the RLM, the German ministry of aviation, formulated a requirement for a shipboard seaplane for reconnaissance missions, to replace the Heinkel He 114. The aircraft was to be light, with a maximum weight of 2.5 tons and a crew of one or two, and suitable for catapult launching. Equipment and armament were to be kept to a minimum.

Focke-Wulf competed with the Fw 62, a conventional biplane design. The Fw 62 was of mixed construction and powered by a 705 kW (945 hp) BMW 132K radial engine. The engine was tightly cowled and drove a two-bladed propeller. The biplane wings were of equal span and featured two N-type struts on each side. They could be folded for shipboard storage. Each wing had a plain flap and an aileron.

== Operational history ==
First flown on 23 October 1937 the Fw 62 V1 twin floats, while the Fw 62 V2 had a large central float and smaller outboard stabilising floats. Official tests began in Travemünde in the summer of 1937. The Fw 62 was a capable aircraft and well liked by test pilots, but the competing Arado Ar 196 monoplane was both conceptually and structurally more modern, and was chosen for production.

== Specifications (Fw 62 V1) ==
Data from Aircraft of the Third Reich

General characteristics

- Crew: 2
- Length: 11.15 m (36 ft 7 in)
- Wingspan: 12.35 m (40 ft 6 in)
- Height: 4.3 m (14 ft 1 in)
- Wing area: 36.1 m^{2} (389 sq ft)
- Empty weight: 2,300 kg (5,071 lb)
- Gross weight: 2,850 kg (6,283 lb)
- Powerplant: 1 × BMW 132Dc 9-cylinder air-cooled radial piston engine, 656 kW (880 hp) for take-off
- Propellers: 2-bladed controllable-pitch airscrew

Performance

- Maximum speed: 280 km/h (170 mph, 150 kn) at 1,000 m (3,300 ft)
- Cruise speed: 251 km/h (156 mph, 136 kn)
- Range: 900 km (560 mi, 490 nmi)
- Service ceiling: 5,900 m (19,400 ft)
- Rate of climb: 6.4 m/s (1,250 ft/min)

Armament

- Guns: 1 × 7.92 mm (0.312 in) MG 15 machine gun in rear cockpit.
- Bombs: 4 × 50 kg (110 lb) SC 50 bombs.

== See also ==
Aircraft of comparable role, configuration, and era

- Arado Ar 196

Related lists

- List of flying boats and floatplanes
