= BMW 114 =

1930s German piston aircraft engine

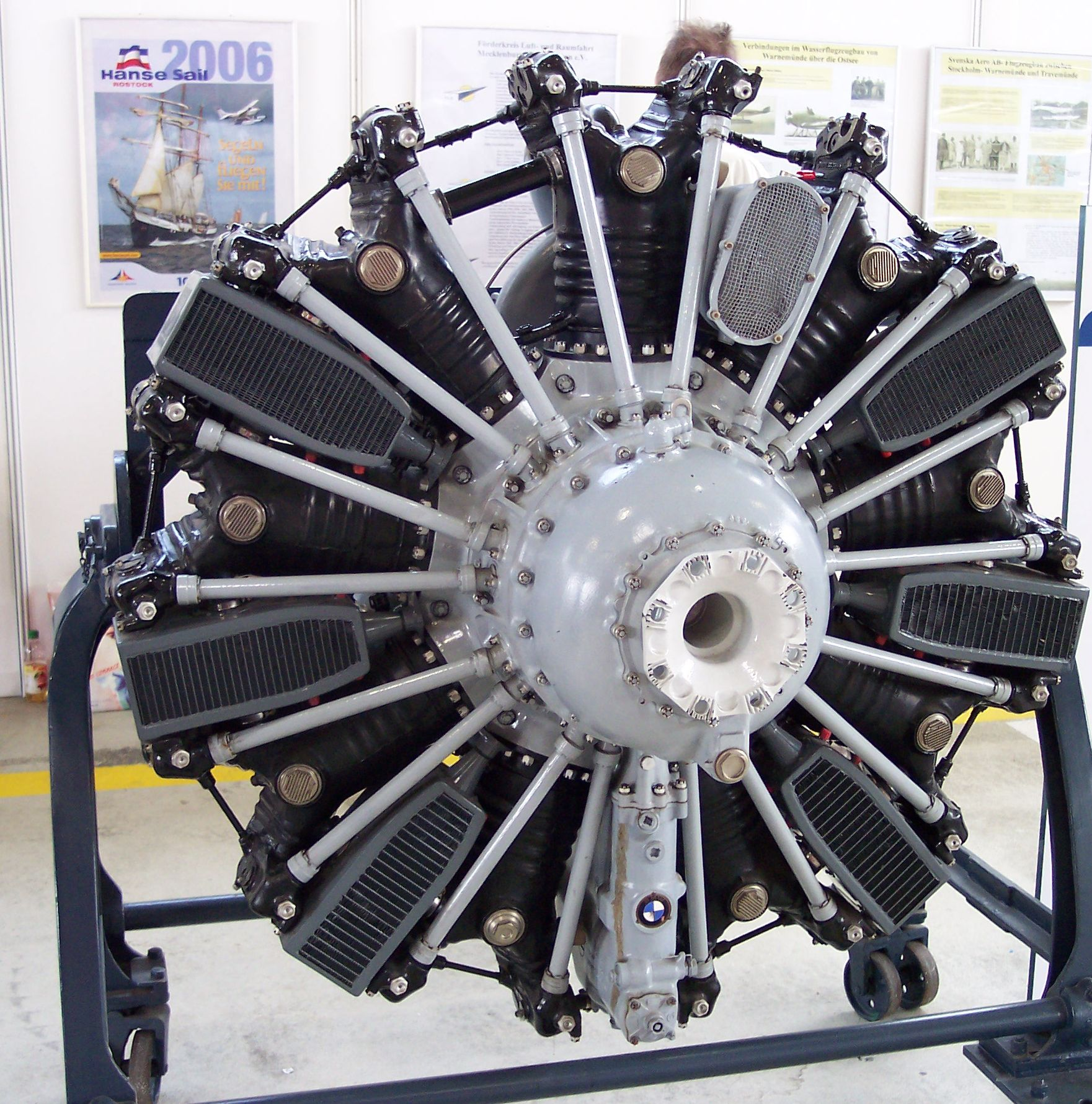
- Preserved BMW-Lanova 114 diesel engine
- Type: Radial engine
- Manufacturer: BMW
- First run: 1935
- Developed from: BMW 132

The BMW 114 was a nine-cylinder air-cooled radial engine intended for military aircraft use. Developed in 1935 from the BMW 132, with which it could be interchanged, work did not progress beyond experimental prototype engines.

== Specifications (BMW 114) ==
Data from BMW Aero Engines

=== General characteristics ===
- Type: 9-cylinder radial engine
- Bore: 155.5 mm
- Stroke: 162 mm
- Displacement: 27.7 L

=== Components ===
- Supercharger: Single speed supercharger
- Cooling system: Air- and liquid-cooled

=== Performance ===
- Power output: 510 HP

== See also ==
Related development

- BMW 132
- Pratt & Whitney R-1690

Comparable engines

- Bristol Phoenix
- Packard DR-980

Related lists

- List of aircraft engines
