= FLM Aviation =

German aviation company based at Kiel-Holtenau Airport

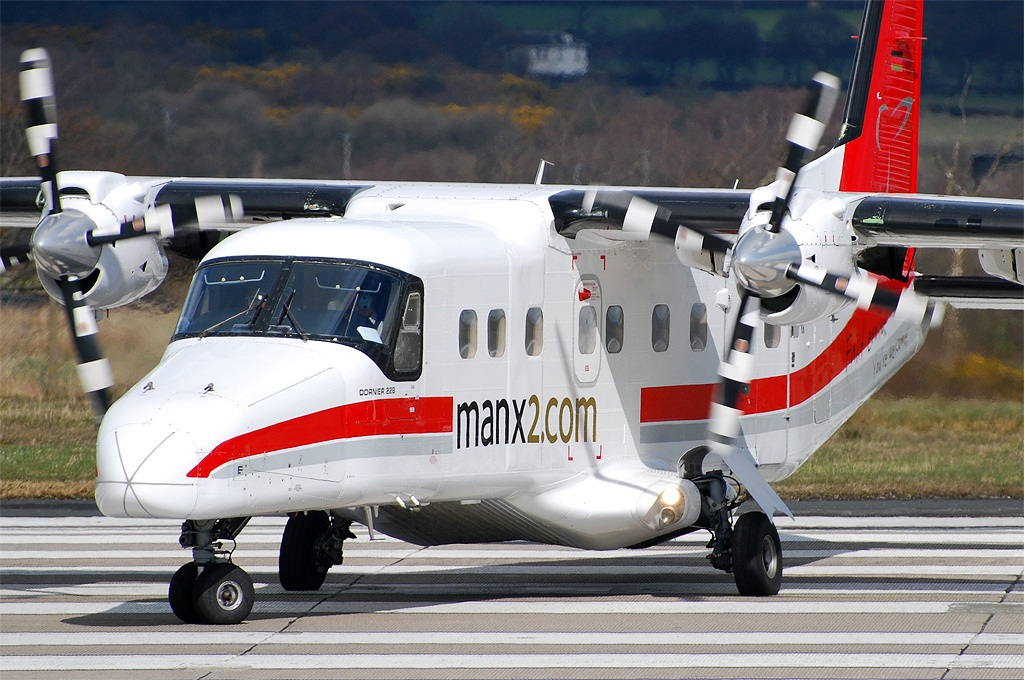
A Manx2 branded Dornier 228

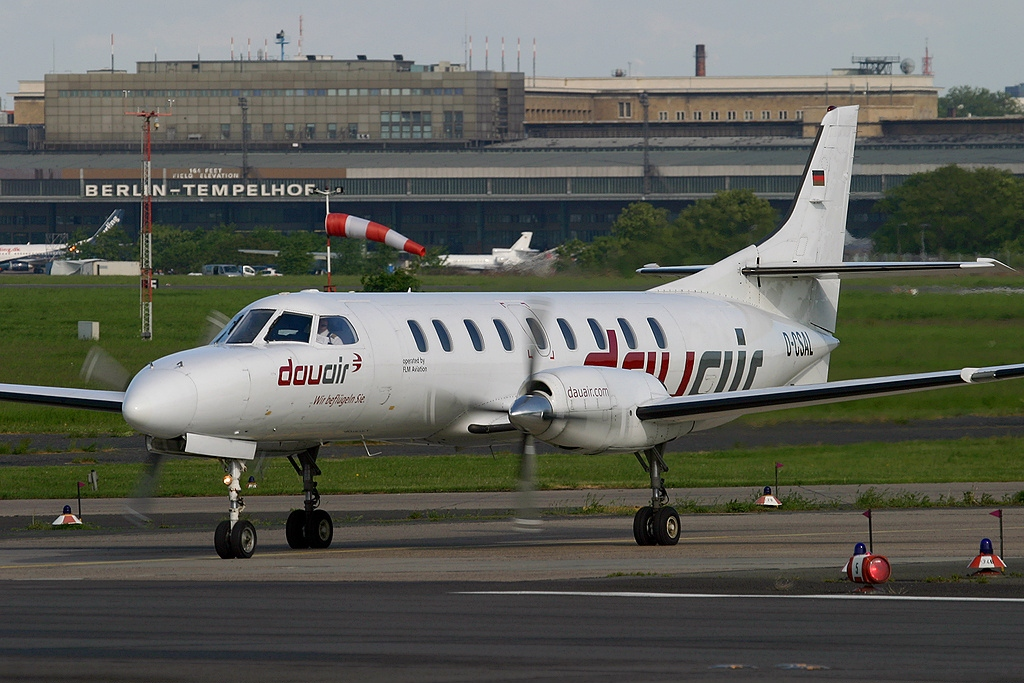
Fairchild SA-227AC Metroliner III in Dauair colors

FLM Aviation was a German aviation company based at Kiel-Holtenau Airport.

== History ==
The company was founded in 1976 by Ernst-Otto Mohrdiek near Hamburg Airport, Uetersen, and subsequently started operations. On 1 February 2013, the company had to apply for insolvency.

== Operations ==
FLM Aviation mainly flew executive charter flights, but also sightseeing, cargo and ambulance flights. At times FLM Aviation operated flights on behalf of dauair and for Manx2 to and from the Isle of Man.

== Fleet ==
As of September 2010, the FLM Aviation fleet consisted of the following aircraft:

- 1 Beech Super King Air 300
- 3 Dornier 228
- 1 Partenavia P68
- 6 Cessna 150/172
