= Kiel Airport =

Airport in Germany

Kiel Airport Flughafen Kiel
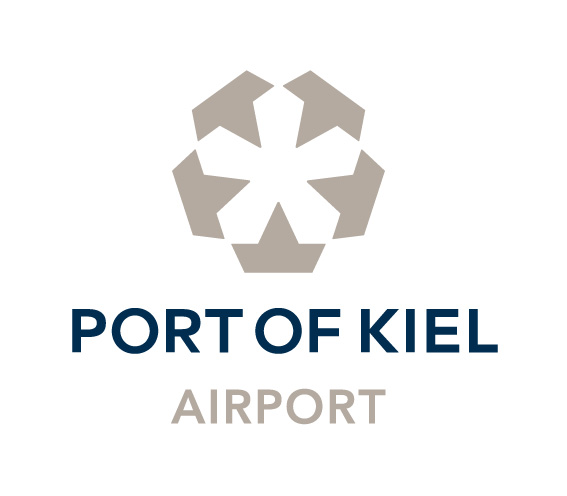

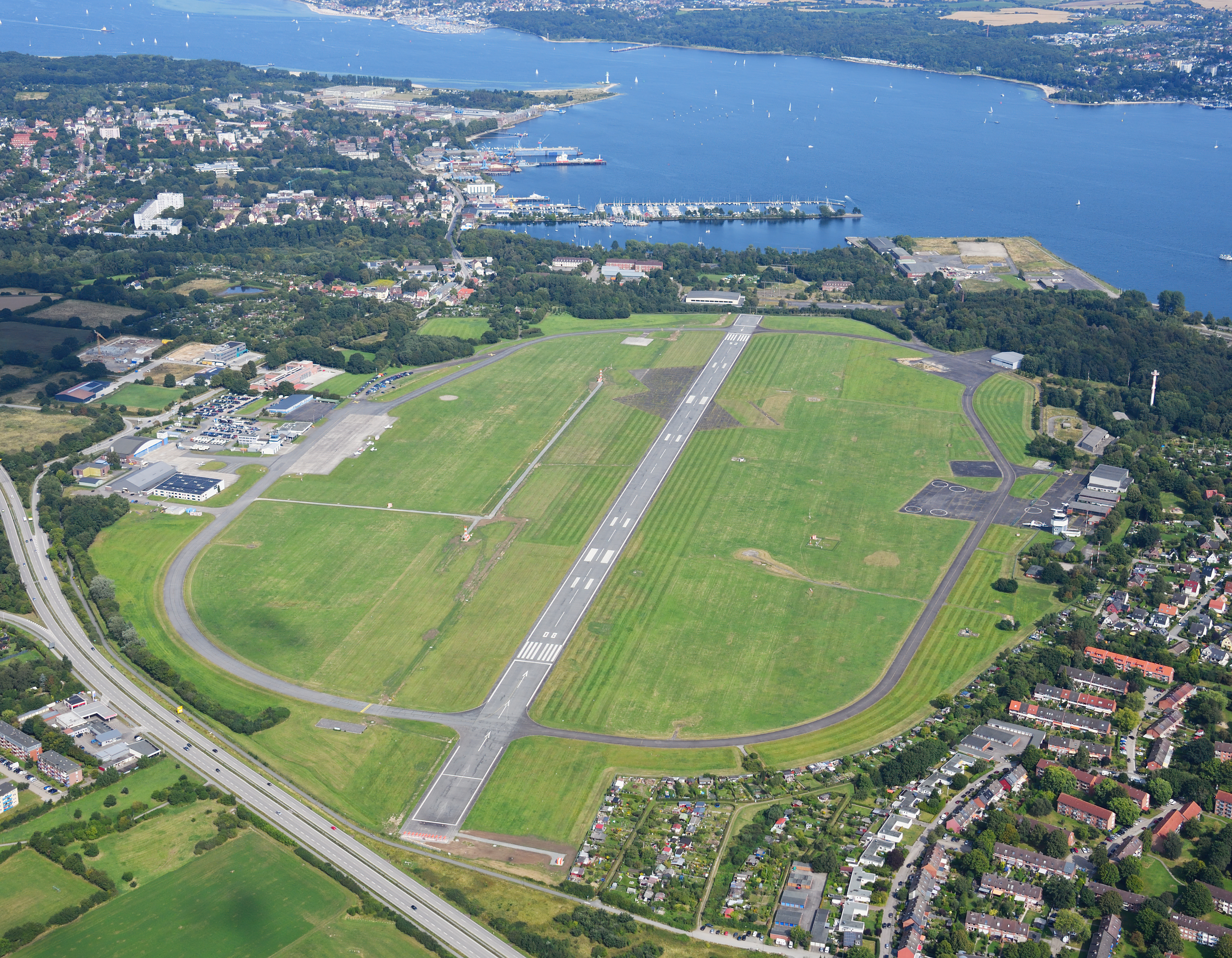
- IATA: KEL; ICAO: EDHK

Summary
- Airport type: Public
- Owner: State of Schleswig-Holstein (55%); City of Kiel (45%)
- Serves: Kiel, Germany
- Elevation AMSL: 101 ft / 31 m
- Coordinates: 54°22′46″N 010°08′43″E
- Website: airport-kiel.de

Map
- Location of Kiel Airport

Runways
Direction	Length		Surface
Direction	m	ft	Surface
08/26	1,260	4,134	Asphalt
- Source: Usage Regulations. AIP at German air traffic control.

Kiel Airport (German: Flughafen Kiel, IATA: KEL, ICAO: EDHK) is a small regional airport in Kiel, Germany. It is located in the borough of Holtenau, 8.3 km (5.2 mi) north of the city centre. It is registered as a public airfield (German: Verkehrslandeplatz). As of 2006, it served 30,528 passengers p. a.

== History ==
The aerodrome was built in 1914 on a plain area that had been created from material dug out during the construction of the Kiel Canal. In 1927, the Kiel Airport Company (German: Kieler Flughafengesellschaft) was founded, which operated the State Airport of Kiel (German: Landflughafen Kiel). During this time, there were 27 national and international destinations. In 1937, the airport was designated a military airbase. However, it continued to be used for civilian flights, such as scheduled flights to Braunschweig and Berlin (Tempelhof).

Its taxiways were extended in 1963, a first terminal was built in 1965. This terminal was used for scheduled flights to West Berlin operated by Pan Am.

In 1987, the terminal that is still used today was built. At the same time Lufthansa began offering scheduled flights to Frankfurt, and later to Cologne/Bonn, Munich, Copenhagen, Kaliningrad and Riga.

In 1995, the airport became a civilian airport again and in 1997, a new control tower that was operated by civilian staff was constructed. However, it continues to be used for military purposes.

A new hangar was built in 2000. In the same year, the airport's future prospects were analysed. Based on that analysis, plans approved by the state administration of Schleswig-Holstein in March 2002 included an extension of the runway from 1300 m to 2100 m. This would have allowed jet aircraft to land at Kiel. Federal Highway B 503 would have crossed the extended runway in a tunnel.

However, use of the airport declined in the following years as more and more scheduled flight routes were discontinued. When the last route was cut on 23 December 2005, operation of the airport was suspended until 3 April 2006 and on 24 January 2006, the state's Secretary of Commerce announced that the extension plans were scrapped for good.

Cirrus Airlines operated scheduled flights to Munich from 2 May 2006 using a single DHC-8-100 aircraft, which was based in Kiel Airport. The state of Schleswig-Holstein offered subsidies for three years. However, as the number of passengers was substantially lower than expected, the service was discontinued in October 2006.

== Airlines and destinations ==
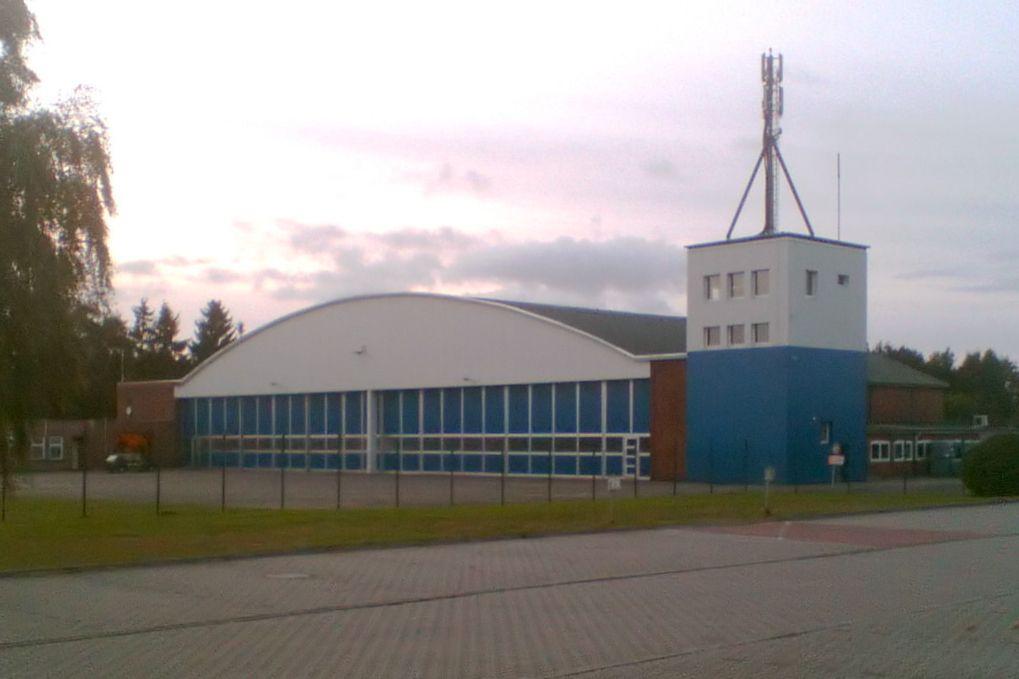
Hangar at Kiel Airport

There are no scheduled services to and from Kiel Airport.

=== Civil use ===
Luftsportverein Kiel e.V. (German for Air Sports Association Kiel) and a helicopter flight service are based at Kiel Airport and the charter airline FLM Aviation used to operate from it. Further, there are annual Internationale Flugtage (German for International Aviation Days) with air acrobatics, parachute jumps and displays of historic aeroplanes.

=== Military use ===
The aerodrome has been in military use since its construction. During World War II, the Luftwaffe operated aircraft in support of the Kriegsmarine from the base, including the 2nd, 3rd, and 5th squadrons of Embarked Air Group 196 (German: Bordfliegergruppe 196) which provided aircraft to support surface combatants.

In 1958, the German Navy based naval aviation units at Kiel. Until 28 March 2013, Air Wing No. 5 (German: Marinefliegergeschwader 5) was based at Kiel, using Sikorsky SH-3 Sea King helicopters for search and rescue operations flown from the airport. Since 2013, they have been based at Nordholz.

German Air Force aircraft operating as fake targets for practice also depart from Kiel Airport.

== Incidents and accidents ==
- On 15 February 2006, a private aircraft from Russia had to make an emergency landing at Kiel because of smoke within the aircraft. The plane overran the runway and slipped down a slope as the pilot was unfamiliar with the airport and misunderstood the runway length given over the radio.

== See also ==
- Transport in Germany
- List of airports in Germany
