= Lyngstad =

Lyngstad is a Norwegian surname. Notable people with this surname include the following:

- Anni-Frid Lyngstad (born 1945), Norwegian-Swedish singer and one of the four members of Swedish pop group ABBA
- Arne Lyngstad (1962–2019), Norwegian politician for the Christian Democratic Party
- Bjarne Lyngstad (1901–1971), Norwegian politician for the Liberal Party
- Ola Torstensen Lyngstad (1894–1952), Norwegian newspaper editor and politician for the Liberal Party
