= Baltiysk (air base) =

Baltiysk Kosa (Neutief)
- Baltiysk, Kaliningrad Oblast in Russia

Site information
- Type: Air Base
- Owner: Ministry of Defence
- Operator: Russian Air Force

Location
- Shown within Kaliningrad Oblast Baltiysk (Russia)
- Coordinates: 54°36′36″N 019°52′6″E

Site history
- Built: 1930
- In use: 1930 - 1995

Airfield information
- Identifiers: ICAO: XMKB
- Elevation: 3 metres (10 ft) AMSL
Runways
Direction	Length and surface
05/23	2,000 metres (6,562 ft) Concrete

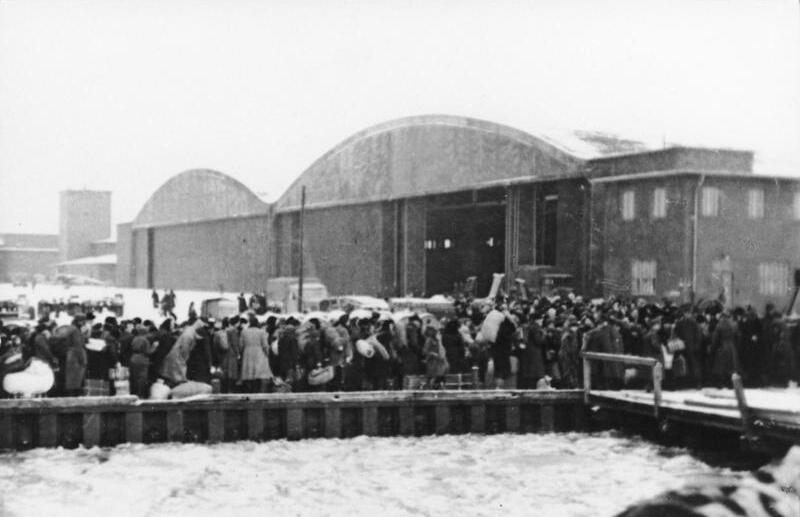
1945 photograph of German refugees near the hangar at Baltiysk during the Evacuation of East Prussia.

Baltiysk (also Noytif) was a military air base in Baltiysk, Kaliningrad Oblast, Russia. It is located on the Vistula Spit, 5 kilometers (3.1 mi) southwest of Baltiysk center within the city proper, on the opposite side of the Strait of Baltiysk close to the westernmost point of Russia.

Originally constructed in the 1930s by Nazi Germany for the Luftwaffe, it was unused during World War II but was damaged by Allied bombings. In 1945 after the war ended, the air base came into possession of the Soviet Union and entered limited service with the Soviet Air Force, who used the remains of the air base to house a small number of interceptor alert pads.

The base was home to the 509th Independent Aviation Squadron Helicopters between 1955 and 1958 and the 49th Independent Anti-Submarine Aviation Squadron between 1948 and 1995.

In 1957 Western intelligence identified 25 Mikoyan-Gurevich MiG-15 (ASCC: Fagot) jet fighters based at Baltiysk. By the early 1960s, Baltiysk had become a reserve airfield, and intelligence missions no longer observed any aircraft the airfield.

The Baltiysk/Noytif Seaplane Base (54°37′25″N 19°52′45″E) operated in the harbor on the northeast side of the airfield until the 1970s. It had five hangars adjoining the waters. The Beriev Be-6 (Madge) was one type of seaplane observed at this base.

In 1992, by order of the Allied Forces of the CIS No. 144, the Beriev Be-12 (Mail) aircraft was removed from service, with the continued operation of the aircraft in units until the end of its service life.

On June 14, 1995, the Main Headquarters of the Navy issued Directive No. 730/1/0446 on the relocation of the 49th OTAE from the Kos airfield to the Khrabrovo airfield for permanent co-location with the 397th OTAE of the Baltic Fleet Air Force. Families, as well as some personnel, continue to live in the Kos (Baltiysk) garrison, traveling for hours to their new duty station. The airfield was abandoned and its looting begins.

On September 1, 1996, the 49th Tallinn Red Banner Order of Ushakov and Nakhimov, a separate anti-submarine aviation squadron and the 397th separate transport aviation squadron were reorganized into the 316th Tallinn Red Banner Order of Ushakov and Nakhimov, a separate mixed aviation regiment with the transfer of the Battle Banner, honorary name, and orders, USSR and historical magazine belonging to the 49th OPLAE. The anti-submarine squadron became the 2nd squadron within the regiment.

In 1998, the regiment was folded into a transport squadron - the 398th OTAE, the 2nd PLAE was liquidated.

In the early 2000s, all Be-12s, except one, were cut up for scrap.

In 2009, the 7054th Naval Aviation Base was formed at the Khrabrovo airfield, but a year later it was disbanded, all military aviation was officially withdrawn from the Khrabrovo airfield, and in fact a transport detachment was based.
