= Rügen Airport =

Rügen Airport/ Güttin Airfield Flugplatz Rügen/ Regionalflugplatz Güttin
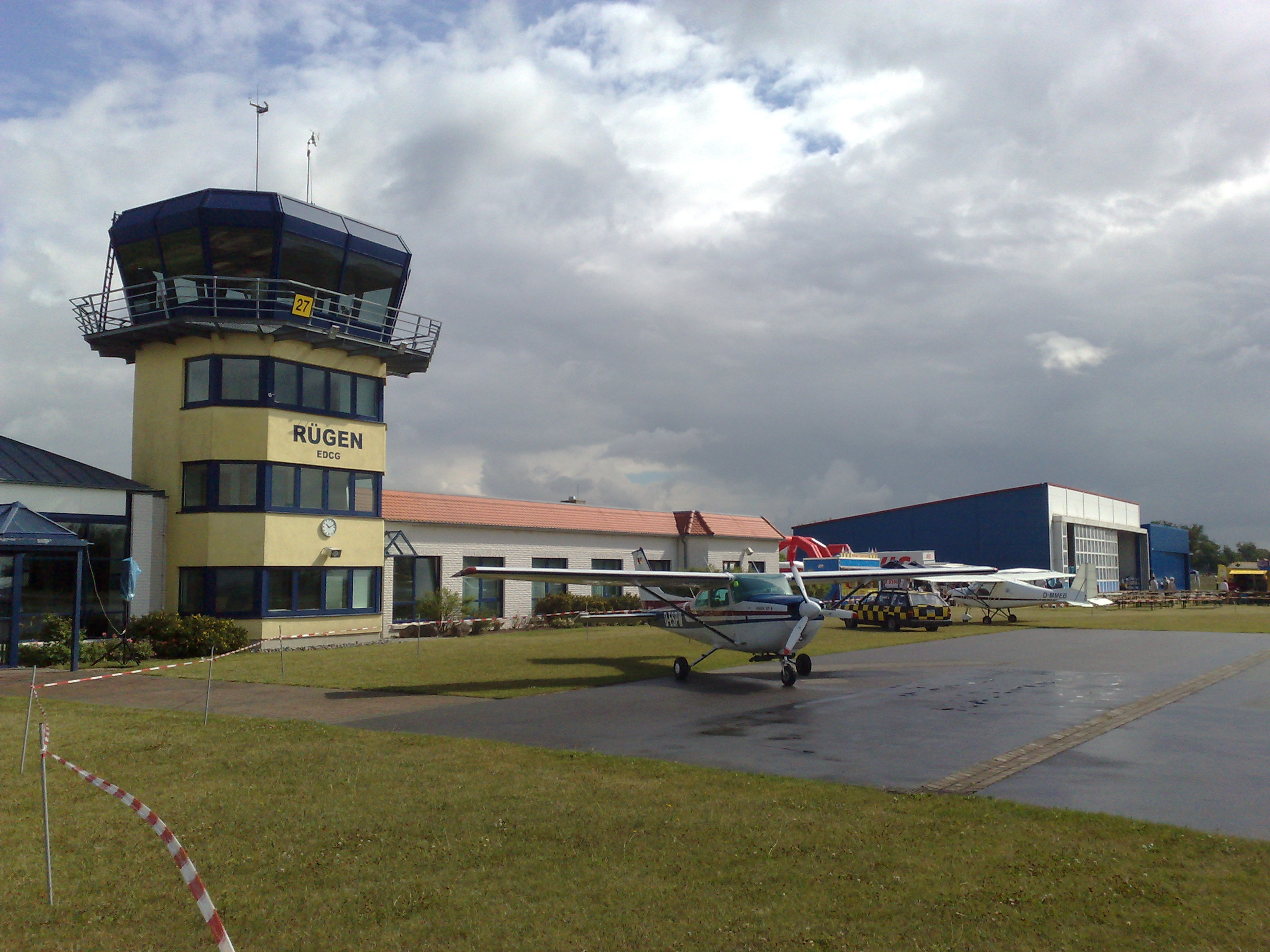
- IATA: GTI; ICAO: EDCG

Summary
- Airport type: commercial airfield
- Operator: Ostsee-Flug-Rügen GmbH
- Location: B 96
- Opened: 1982
- Elevation AMSL: 69 ft (21 m)
- Coordinates: 54°23′03″N 013°19′54″E
- Interactive map of Rügen Airport/ Güttin Airfield

Runways
Direction	Length		Surface
Direction	ft	m	Surface
08/26	2,952	900	Tarmac

Statistics
- Passengers: between 15,000 and 20,000 annually
- Terminals: 1

Rügen Airport (Regionalflugplatz Rügen), also known as Bergen Airfield or Güttin Airfield (Regionalflugplatz Güttin), ((IATA: GTI, ICAO: EDCG)) is the only airfield on the German Baltic Sea island of Rügen. The airfield lies in the municipality of Dreschvitz in its subdistrict of Güttin, about 8 kilometres south of the town of Bergen next to the B 96 federal road. Use of the tarmac runway is restricted to aeroplanes with a maximum weight of 5.7 tonnes. It can be lit for night-time operations.

== Access ==
=== Road ===
The airfield lies only a few hundred metres from the B 96 federal road.

=== Rail ===
The airfield is not far from the railway line from Stralsund via Bergen to Sassnitz/Binz. The nearest station on this line is Teschenhagen, less than 3 kilometres (2 mi) away by road. In Teschenhagen there are hourly connexions at peak times on the RegionalExpress to Stralsund, and to Bergen auf Rügen. There are also connections to Rostock, Sassnitz, and Binz.

== History ==
=== Beginnings ===
The airfield started life as an agricultural airstrip in Güttin with a grass runway. After being exclusively used for agricultural flights from 1982 to 1990, in summer 1990 the first round trips over the island were offered, initially with agricultural aircraft of type Let Z-37 and Antonow (AN-2)

=== Development since 1990 ===
In the years after 1990 the first charter flights to Bornholm, Berlin-Tempelhof and Hamburg were added. In May 1993 the 750 metre-long grass airstrip was replaced by a 900-metre-long tarmac runway with associated taxiways. In 1995 a hangar with a floor area of 20x30 metres was built and PAPI landing lights installed. In July 1998, a new terminal building with a tower and restaurant was opened. There is also a stationary, above-ground fuel tank facility for Avgas as well as Jet A1.
