= Heinkel He 60 =

German Ship-based reconnaissance floatplane

He 60
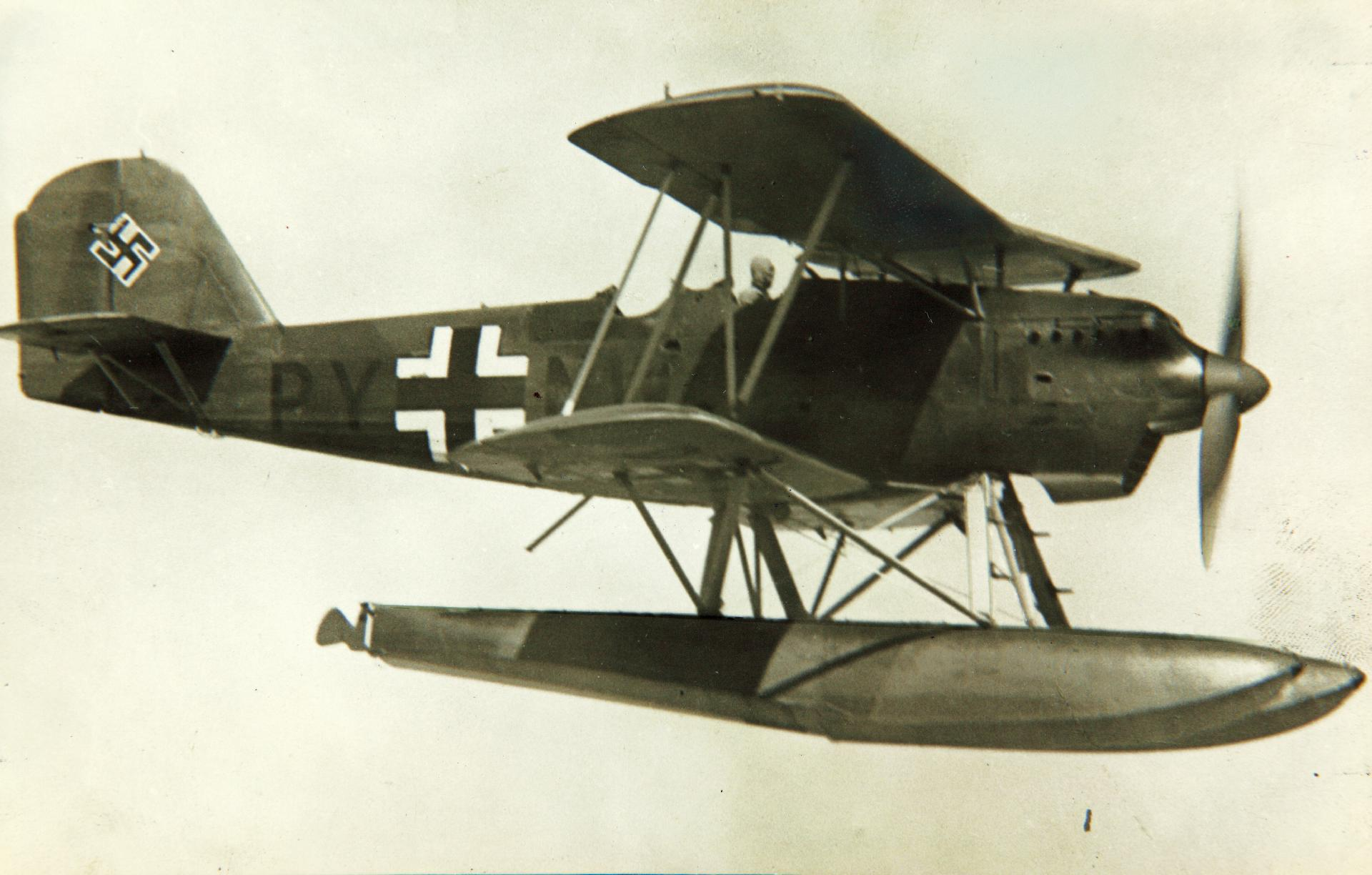
- Heinkel He 60.

General information
- Type: Reconnaissance seaplane
- Manufacturer: Heinkel
- Primary users: Luftwaffe Kriegsmarine
- Number built: 361

History
- Introduction date: 1933
- First flight: Early 1933
- Retired: 1943

The Heinkel He 60 was a German single-engined biplane reconnaissance seaplane designed to be catapulted from Kriegsmarine (German navy) warships of the 1930s.

== Development and design ==
The Heinkel He 60 was designed by Heinkel engineer Reinhold Mewes, the designer of the He 59. The resulting design was a single-engined biplane of mixed wood and metal construction with fabric covering. Its single bay wings were of equal-span and had significant stagger.

The first prototype flew early in 1933 and proved to be underpowered with its 492 kW (660 hp) BMW VI engine. The second prototype had a more powerful version of the BMW engine, but this only marginally improved its performance and was unreliable, so production aircraft reverted to the original engine. Of conventional configuration, the He 60 was a sturdy aircraft, designed (as the specification required) to be capable of operating on the open sea. As a result, it was always somewhat underpowered for its weight, which made handling sluggish and the aircraft vulnerable to enemy fire. Attempts were made to solve its lack of power by fitting one aircraft with a Daimler-Benz DB 600 engine, but engines were not available for production. About 200 He 60Cs and Ds were built by Arado and Weser.

== Operational history ==
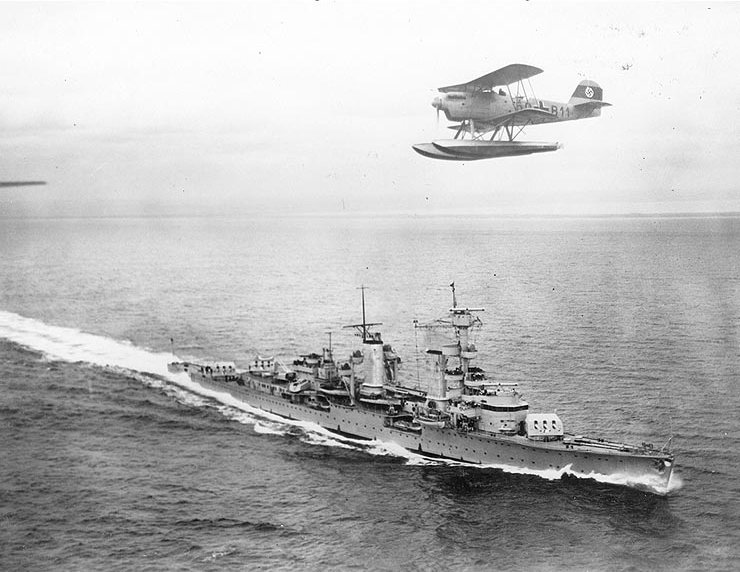
A Heinkel He 60 flies above the German light cruiser Köln

Initial deliveries of the He 60 were to Kriegsmarine training units in June 1933. From 1934, the major production version, the He 60C began to be delivered to the shipboard observation seaplane units of the Kriegsmarine, operating from the catapults of all German cruisers. It also saw action with Spanish Nationalist forces during the Civil War.

In 1939 it was replaced in service as a shipboard aircraft first by the He 114, then soon after by the Arado Ar 196, but it remained in service with several coast reconnaissance Staffeln (squadrons) when World War II began. It had been withdrawn from front-line service by 1940, but returned to use following Germany's invasion of the Soviet Union in 1941, being used by various SAGr (Seeaufklarungsgruppe/Maritime reconnaissance group) for coastal patrols in the Baltic and Mediterranean Seas. All He 60s were removed from service by October 1943.

== Variants ==
He 60a
First prototype which began flight testing in early 1933.
He 60b
Second prototype which experimented with a more powerful engine. However, it proved no better and the design reverted to that used in the 60a.
He 60c
Third prototype, used for successful catapult trials in early 1933. This aircraft was delivered into operational service with the navy.
He 60A
14 pre-production aircraft were ordered. A total of 81 A-variant aircraft were produced.
He 60B
Initial production version, commencing in 1934.
He 60B-3
In 1933 a single aircraft was fitted with a 671 kW (900 hp) Daimler-Benz DB 600 engine in an effort to improve performance. However, the development was dropped.
He 60C
In late summer 1934, the improved C-variant went into production, with first deliveries in Autumn 1934.
He 60D
The D-variant was similar to the He 60C, with the capability added for a fixed MG-17 machine gun and improved radio equipment. Production commenced in June 1936.
He 60E
6 aircraft were ordered by Spain, and these D-variants were called the 60E, ending delivery in April 1937. They flew coastal patrols in the Spanish Civil War, and the last aircraft were withdrawn from service in 1948.

== Operators ==
Bulgaria

- Bulgarian Navy - 5 examples from 1942-1944

Germany

- Luftwaffe
- Kriegsmarine

Spanish State

- Spanish Air Force

== Specifications (He 60) ==
Data from War Planes of the Second World War: Volume Six Floatplanes

General characteristics

- Crew: 2
- Length: 11.5 m (37 ft 9 in)
- Wingspan: 13.5 m (44 ft 3 in)
- Height: 5.3 m (17 ft 5 in)
- Wing area: 56 m^{2} (600 sq ft)
- Empty weight: 2,735 kg (6,030 lb)
- Gross weight: 3,407 kg (7,511 lb)
- Powerplant: 1 × BMW VI 6.0 V-12 liquid-cooled piston engine, 492 kW (660 hp)
- Propellers: 2-bladed fixed-pitch propeller

Performance

- Maximum speed: 240 km/h (150 mph, 130 kn) at sea level
- Cruise speed: 216 km/h (134 mph, 117 kn)
- Range: 826 km (513 mi, 446 nmi) at 2,000 m (6,600 ft)
- Service ceiling: 5,000 m (16,000 ft)
- Time to altitude: 1,000 m (3,300 ft) in 3 minutes 12 seconds

Armament

- Guns: 1 × 7.92 mm (.312 in) MG 15 machine gun in flexible mount for observer

== See also ==
Related lists

- List of aircraft of World War II
- List of World War II military aircraft of Germany
- List of military aircraft of Germany
