= BMW 132 =

German radial aircraft engine

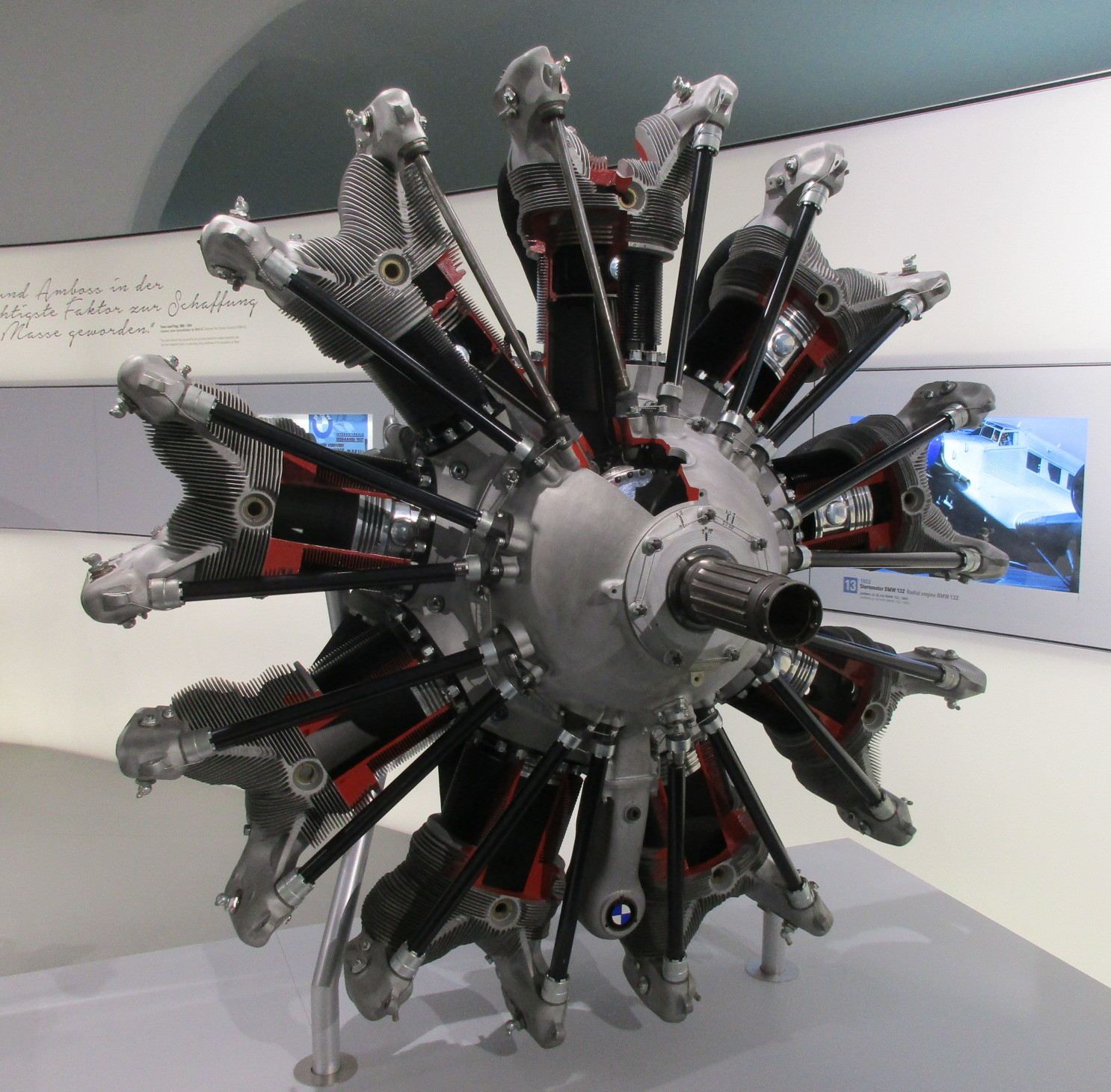
- Preserved BMW 132 at the BMW Museum
- Type: Radial engine
- National origin: Germany
- Manufacturer: BMW
- First run: 1933
- Major applications: Junkers Ju 52
- Number built: >21,000
- Developed from: Pratt & Whitney R-1690 Hornet
- Developed into: BMW 114

The BMW 132 was a nine-cylinder radial aircraft engine produced by BMW starting in 1933.

== Design and development ==
BMW took over a license for manufacturing air-cooled radial engines from Pratt & Whitney on 3 January 1928. The nine-cylinder model Pratt & Whitney R-1690 Hornet was initially manufactured virtually unchanged under the designation BMW Hornet.

Soon BMW embarked on its own development. The result was the BMW 132, essentially an improved version of the Hornet engine, that went into production in 1933. A number of different versions were built; aside from the carburetor designs used mainly in civilian aircraft, versions with direct fuel injection were manufactured for the German Luftwaffe. The engines had a displacement of 27.7 L (1,690 cu in) and generated from 725 PS (533 kW; 715 hp) to 1,200 PS (880 kW; 1,200 hp) depending on model.

The 132 found widespread use in the transport role, remaining the primary powerplant of the Junkers Ju 52 for much of its life, turning the BMW 132 into one of the most important aircraft engines for civilian aircraft during the 1930s.

Numerous pioneering flights were undertaken with the BMW 132. The most impressive was the first direct flight from Berlin to New York in a four-engined Focke-Wulf 200 S-1 Condor. It covered the distance to New York in 24 hours and 57 minutes on 10 August 1938.

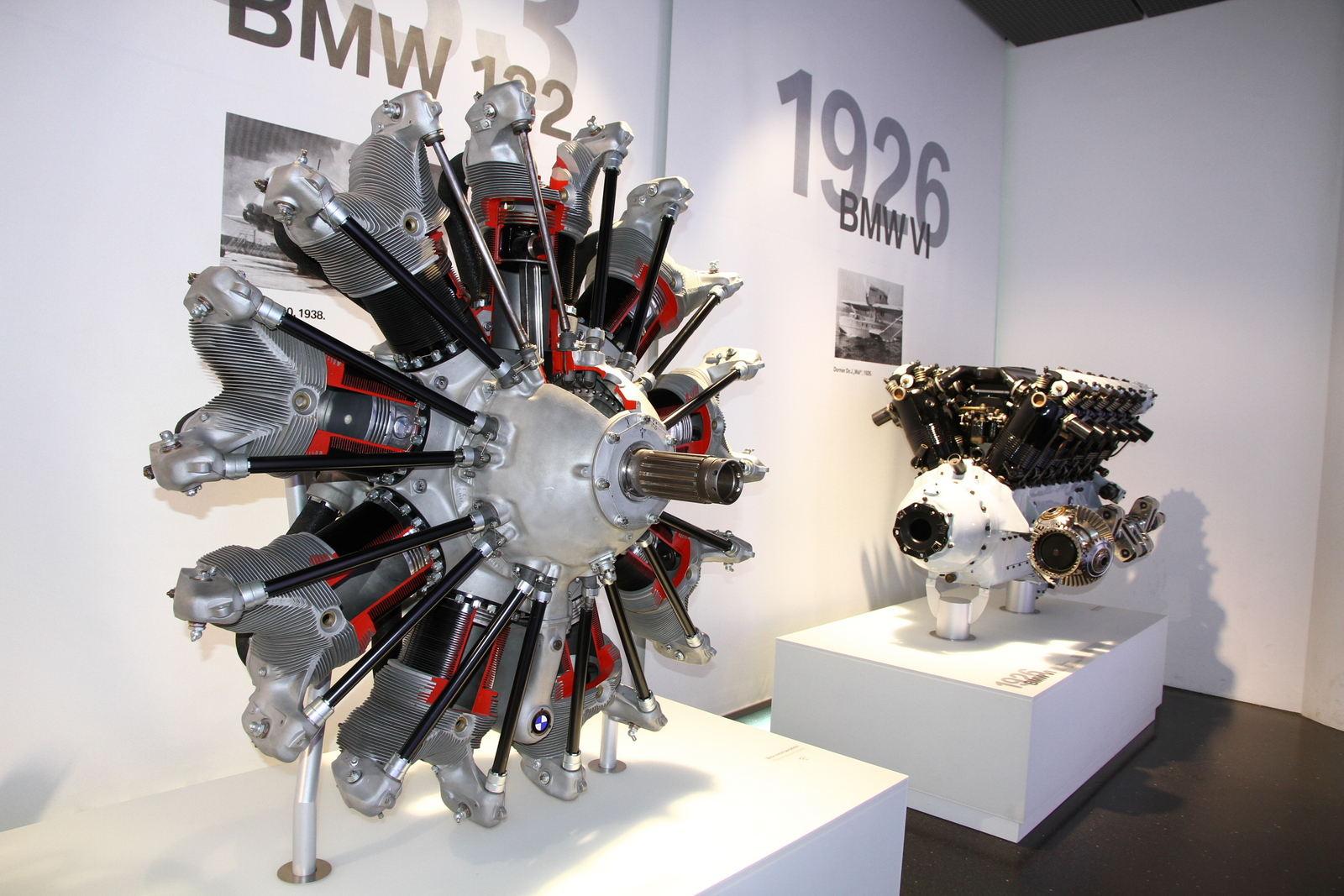
BMW 132 engine

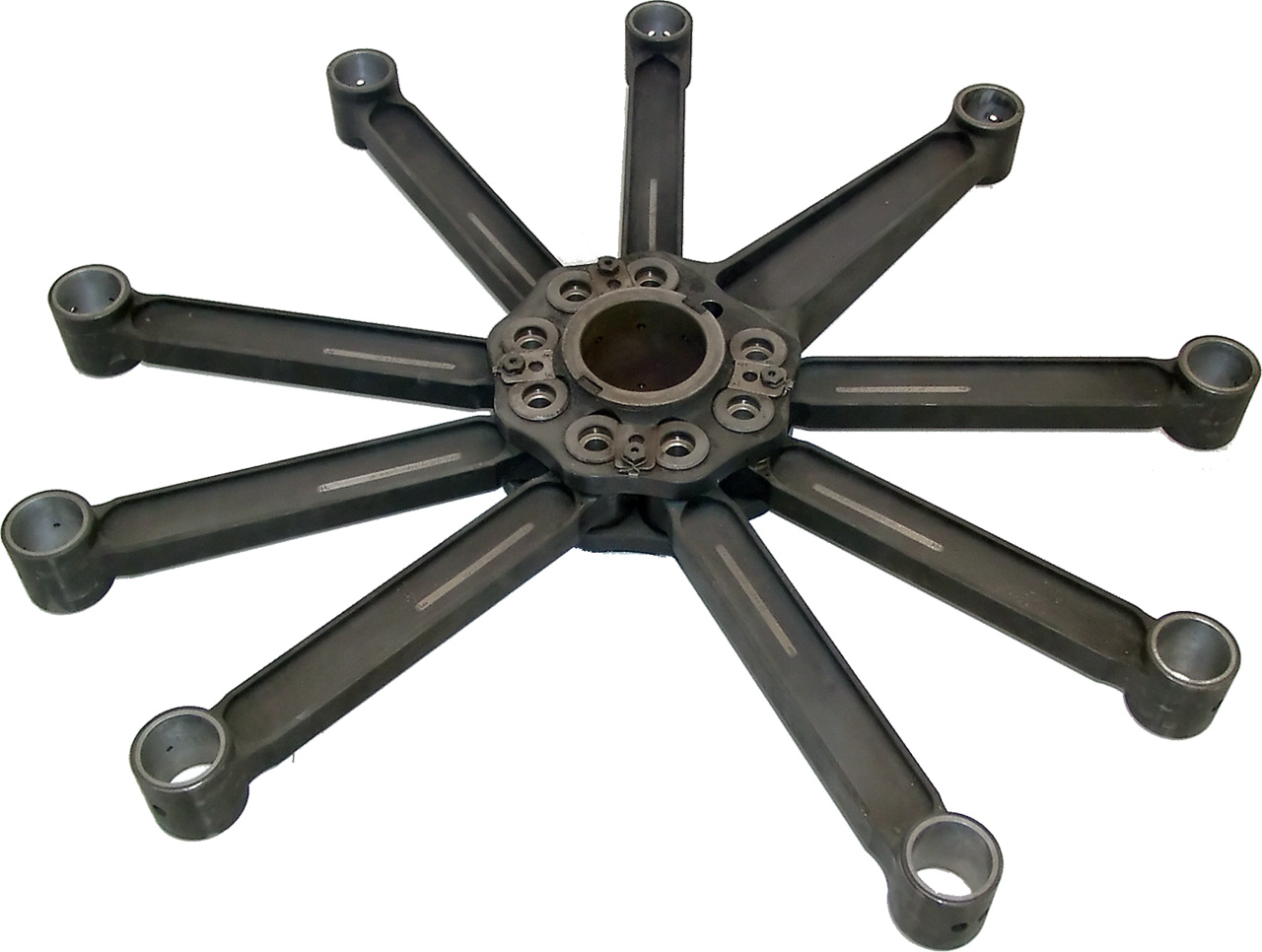
Connecting rods

== Variants ==
132A
725 PS (533 kW; 715 hp)
132Dc
850 PS (630 kW; 840 hp)
132De
880 PS (650 kW; 870 hp)
132J/K
960 PS (710 kW; 950 hp) with higher rpm
132N
865 PS (636 kW; 853 hp)
132T
730 PS (540 kW; 720 hp)
132W
1,065 PS (783 kW; 1,050 hp)
ENMA Beta B-4 (Spanish license-built version)
(9E-C29-775) 785 PS (577 kW; 774 hp) (stroke 174.6 mm (6.87 in), displacement 29.85 L (1,822 cu in))

== Applications ==
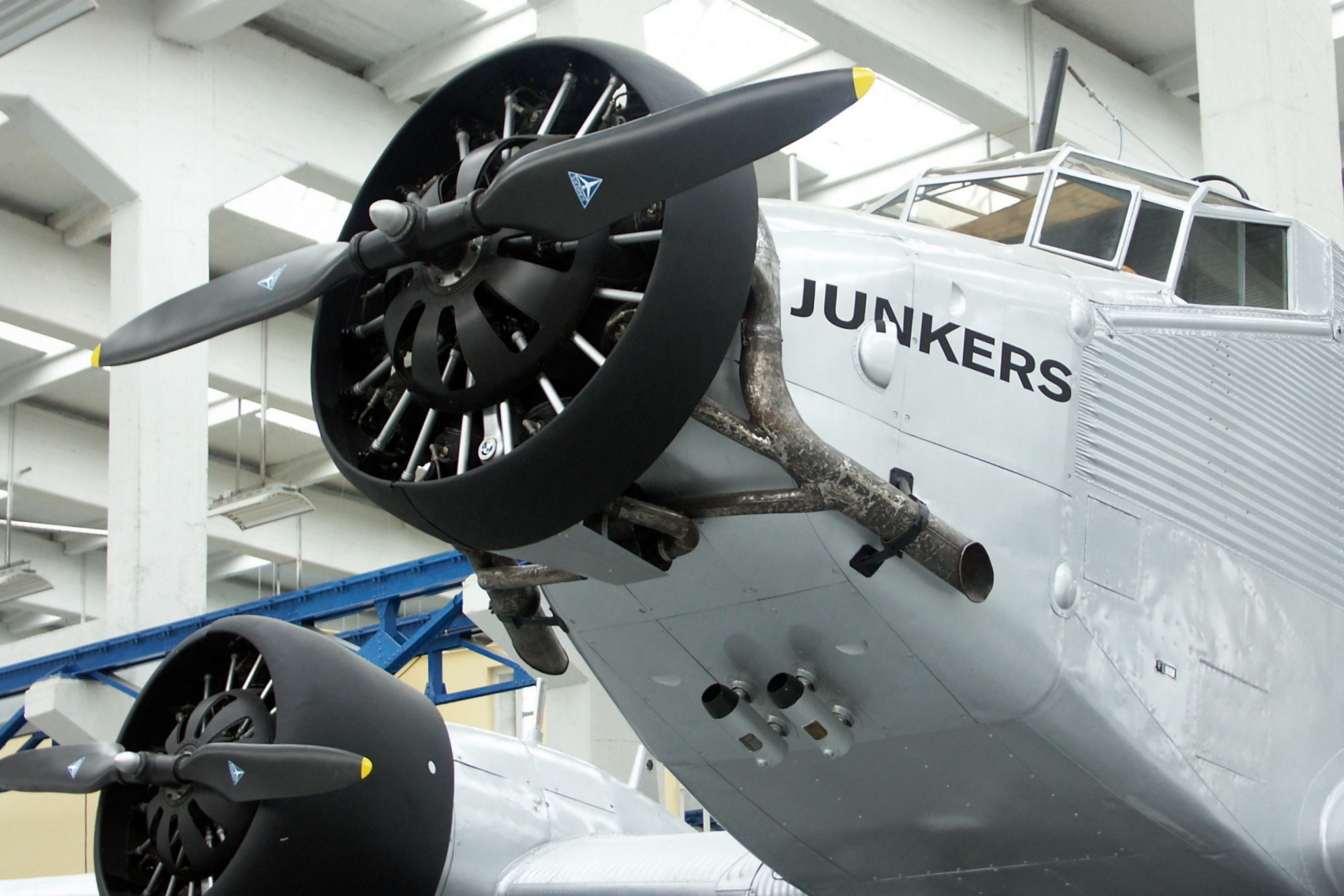
Junkers Ju 52

- Arado Ar 195
- Arado Ar 196
- Arado Ar 197
- Blohm & Voss Ha 140
- Blohm & Voss BV 141
- Blohm & Voss BV 142
- Dornier Do 17P
- Fieseler Fi 98
- Focke-Wulf Fw 200 Condor
- Heinkel He 114
- Heinkel He 115
- Henschel Hs 123
- Henschel Hs 126
- IAR 38
- Junkers W 34
- Junkers Ju 52
- Junkers Ju 86
- Junkers Ju 90
- Junkers Ju 160

== Specifications (BMW 132 Dc) ==
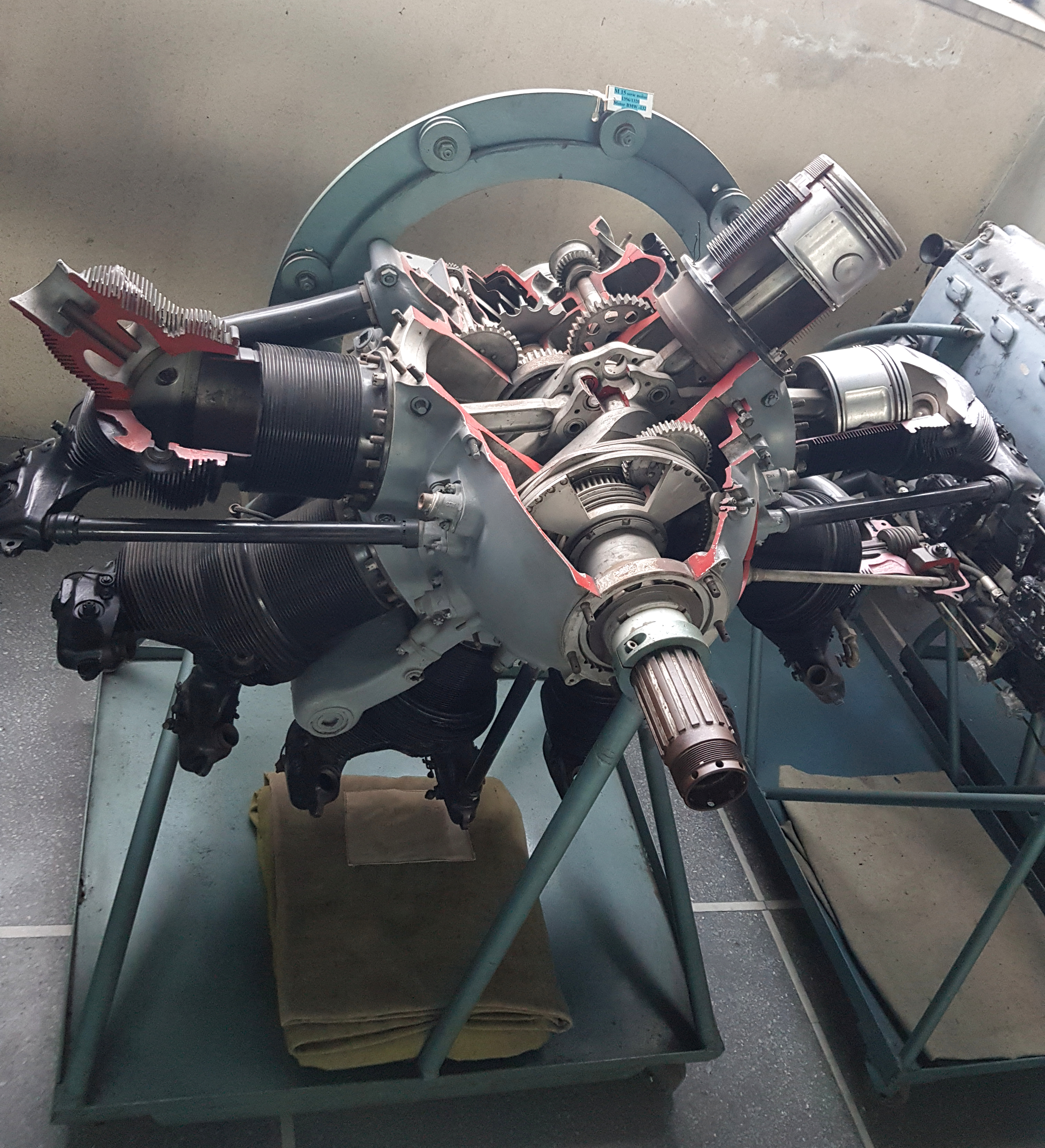
BMW 132, M15 in the National Military Museum, Romania.

Data from Flugzeug-Typenbuch. Handbuch der deutschen Luftfahrt- und Zubehör-Industrie 1944

=== General characteristics ===
- Type: 9-cylinder single-row supercharged air-cooled radial engine
- Bore: 155.6 mm (6.13 in)
- Stroke: 161.9 mm (6.37 in)
- Displacement: 27.72 L (1,691.6 cu in)
- Length: 1,411 mm (55.55 in)
- Diameter: 1,380 mm (54.33 in)
- Dry weight: 525 kg (1,157 lb)

=== Components ===
- Valvetrain: Two overhead valves per cylinder
- Supercharger: Single-speed centrifugal-type supercharger rated to 2,600 m (8,530 ft)
- Fuel system: Mona-Hobson carburetor
- Fuel type: 87 octane rating gasoline
- Oil system: pressure system at 6–7.5 bar (600–750 kPa)
- Cooling system: Air-cooled
- Reduction gear: Farman epicyclic gearing, 0.62:1

=== Performance ===
- Power output:

- 850 PS (838 hp; 625 kW) for takeoff at 2,450 rpm (1 minute) at sea level
- 780 PS (769 hp; 574 kW) at 2,350 rpm (5 minutes) at sea level
- 690 PS (681 hp; 507 kW) at 2,250 rpm (30 minutes) at sea level
- 550 PS (542 hp; 405 kW) at 2,100 rpm (max. duration) at sea level
- 500 PS (493 hp; 368 kW) at 2,000 rpm (max range) at sea level

- Specific power: 28.15 PS/L (0.45 hp/cu in; 20.70 kW/L)
- Compression ratio: 6.5:1
- Specific fuel consumption: 0.24 kg/PSh (0.536 lb/(hp⋅h); 0.326 kg/kWh) at 2,100 rpm
- Oil consumption: 0.003–0.007 kg/PSh (0.007–0.016 lb/(hp⋅h); 0.004–0.010 kg/kWh) at 2,100 rpm
- Power-to-weight ratio: 1.49 PS/kg (0.67 hp/lb; 1.10 kW/kg)
- B.M.E.P.=9.75 bar (141.4 psi)

== See also ==
Related development

- BMW 114
- Pratt & Whitney R-1690 Hornet
- Wright R-1820

Related lists

- List of aircraft engines

== Bibliography ==
- Bingham, Victor (1998). Major Piston Aero Engines of World War II. Shrewsbury, UK: Airlife Publishing. ISBN 1-84037-012-2.
- Gunston, Bill (2006). World Encyclopedia of Aero Engines: From the Pioneers to the Present Day (5th ed.). Stroud, UK: Sutton. ISBN 0-7509-4479-X.
