= Heinkel He 114 =

German Ship-based reconnaissance floatplane

He 114
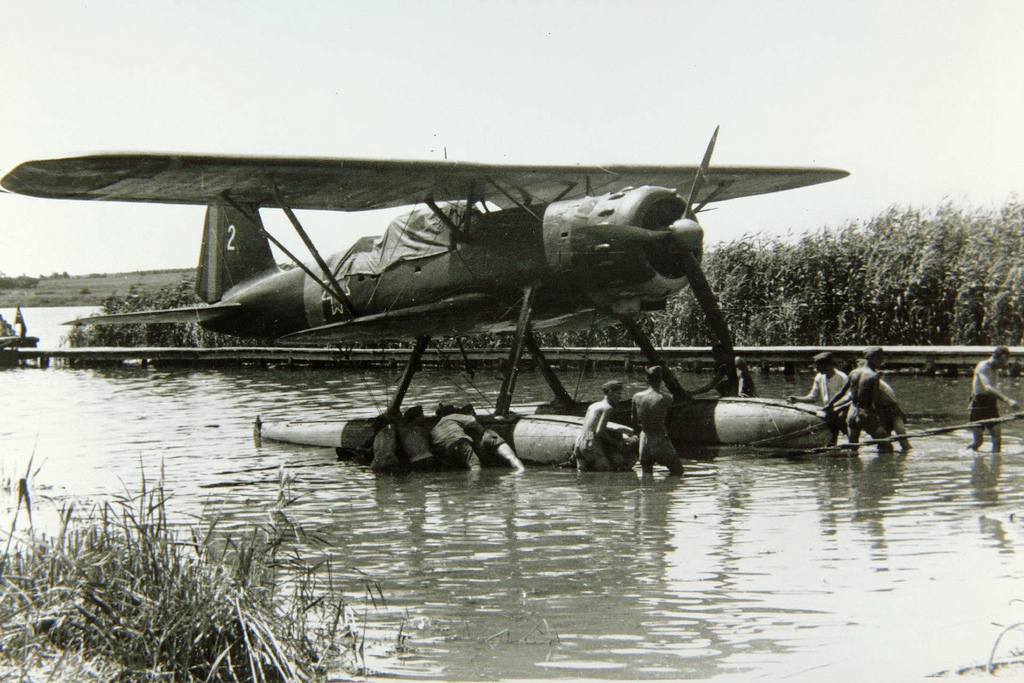
- Heinkel He 114 of the Romanian Air Force

General information
- Type: Reconnaissance floatplane
- National origin: Germany
- Manufacturer: Heinkel
- Primary users: Germany Sweden; Romania; Spain

History
- Introduction date: 1939
- First flight: 1936
- Retired: 1945 (Luftwaffe); 1960 (Romania); 1949 (Sweden); 1954 (Spain)

The Heinkel He 114 was a sesquiplane reconnaissance seaplane produced for the Kriegsmarine in the 1930s for use from warships. It replaced the company's He 60, but it did not remain in service long before being replaced by the Arado Ar 196, Germany's standard observation seaplane.

== Design and development ==
While the fuselage and flotation gear of the He 114 were conventional, it used a sesquiplane wing, with a much smaller lower wing. The upper wings were attached to the fuselage with cabane struts, and the lower wings were of reduced span but a similar chord.

== Operational history ==
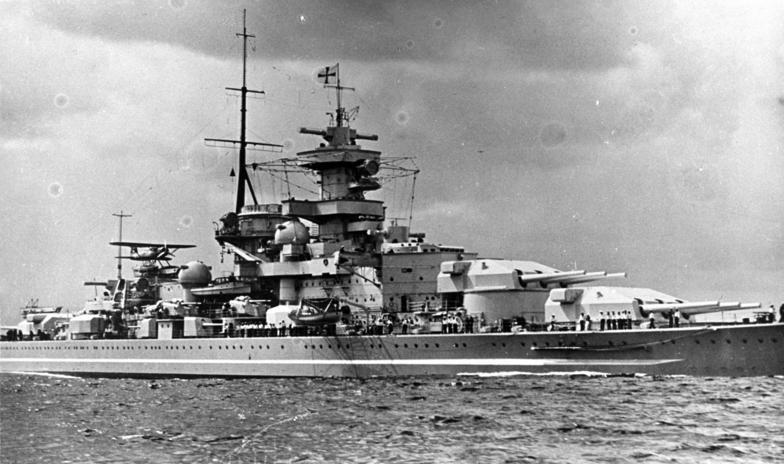
The German battleship Gneisenau with a He 114 on its catapult in 1939

The He 114 was never a great success, was not built in large numbers, and served with the Luftwaffe for only a short time. While the He 60 had handled very well on the water but sluggish in the air, the He 114's handling while afloat was poor and its performance in the air scarcely better than the aircraft it replaced.

A total of 24 aircraft were exported to Romania, where the last 8 remained in service until 1 May 1960. In July 1943 Spain acquired 12 aircraft of the A and C variants, they were retired in 1954.

On 1 November 1939 Sweden ordered 12 aircraft of the B-1 variant. The aircraft were planned to be delivered in December the same year but was soon rescheduled to Spring the following year. In April 1940 Sweden increased the order by 24 aircraft, Heinkel responded by informing that the original order would not be delivered as the German government had enacted a ban on military materiel export to Sweden. When the ban was lifted, the 12 aircraft originally intended for Sweden had already been taken into service of the Luftwaffe. By the end of 1940 Germany gave notice that it could deliver 12 aircraft, Sweden accepted but Germany soon cancelled the order. The purchase could, however, be realized in 1941 and 12 used He 114 arrived in Sweden dismantled in boxes in the spring of the same year. The airplanes were assembled and given a complete overhaul before entering service at Roslagens flygflottilj (F2) in Hägernäs under the designation S 12 (S being an abbreviation for 'reconnaissance aircraft' in Sweden).

The hilfskreuzer Atlantis, Pinguin and Widder were equipped with two He 114 each. They made extensive use of these aircraft during their raiding careers in 1940-41, until the aircraft were lost or worn out. Some were replaced by Arado's brought by supply ships whilst they were still at large.

== Surviving aircraft ==
In 2012, two divers discovered the wreckage of a Heinkel 114 at the bottom of Lake Siutghiol, in Romania. Near the Heinkel were also sections of two other seaplanes, a Blohm & Voss BV 138 (initially thought to be a Savoia-Marchetti S.55) and a Junkers W 34 (discovered in 2013). The wrecks were recovered by Romanian Navy divers in October 2012, and are stored at the National Museum of the Romanian Navy.

== Variants ==
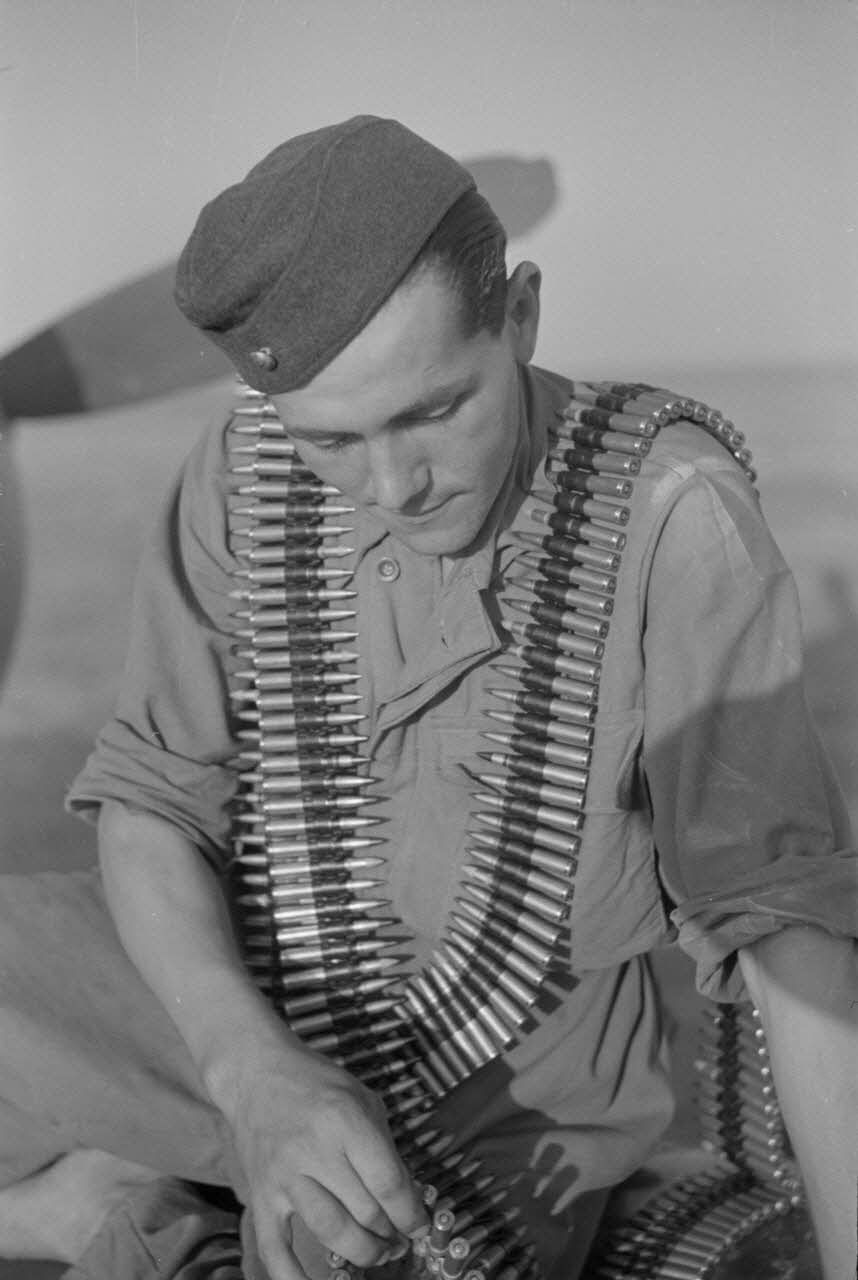
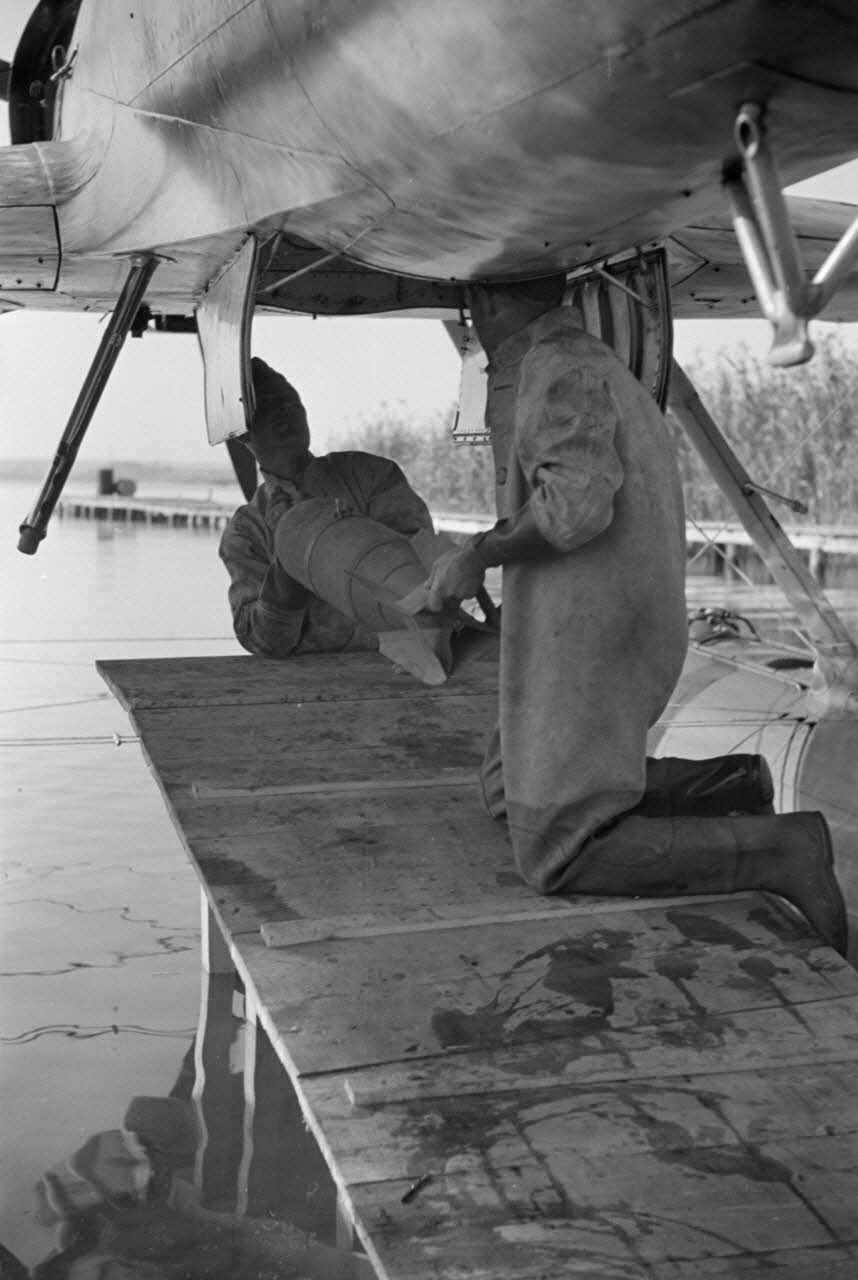
A Romanian He 114 loaded with ammunition and bombs for a mission

He 114A-0
10 pre-production aircraft, powered by a 656 kW (880 hp) BMW 132Dc engine.
He 114A-1
Training version, powered by a 656 kW (880 hp) BMW 132Dc engine, 33 built.
He 114A-2
Main production shipborne version.
He 114B-1
Export version of the He 114A-2 for Sweden, 12 built.
He 114B-2
Export version of the He 114A-2 for Romania, six built.
He 114B-3
Export version for Romania, 12 built.
He 114C-1
Reconnaissance biplane for the Luftwaffe, 14 built.
He 114C-2
Unarmed shipborne (Kriegsmarine commerce raider) version, four built.

== Operators ==
Germany

- Luftwaffe

Romania

- Royal Romanian Naval Aviation received 24 aircraft.
- Romanian Air Force operated several aircraft until 1960.

Spain

- Spanish Air Force
- Spanish Navy

Sweden

- Swedish Air Force

== Specifications (He 114A-2) ==
Data from Warplanes of the Luftwaffe., Heinkel: Chronik und Typenblätter der Firma Heinkel-Flugzeugbau

General characteristics

- Crew: 2
- Length: 11.65 m (38 ft 3 in)
- Wingspan: 13.6 m (44 ft 7 in)
- Height: 5.23 m (17 ft 2 in)
- Wing area: 42.3 m^{2} (455 sq ft)
- Empty weight: 2,300 kg (5,071 lb)
- Gross weight: 3,670 kg (8,091 lb)
- Powerplant: 1 × BMW 132K 9-cylinder air-cooled radial piston engine, 716 kW (960 hp)

Performance

- Maximum speed: 335 km/h (208 mph, 181 kn)
- Range: 920 km (570 mi, 500 nmi)
- Service ceiling: 4,900 m (16,100 ft)
- Rate of climb: 5.5 m/s (1,080 ft/min)
- Time to altitude: 1,000 m (3,300 ft) in 4 minutes 30 seconds
- Wing loading: 86.8 kg/m^{2} (17.8 lb/sq ft)
- Power/mass: 0.20 kW/kg (0.12 hp/lb)

Armament

- 1 × 7.92×57mm (.312 in) MG 15 machine gun in flexible mount for observer
- 2 × 7.92×57mm (.312 in) MG 17 machine gun behind the engine firing through the propeller arc (optional)
- 2 × 50 kg (110 lb) bombs

== See also ==
Aircraft of comparable role, configuration, and era

- Fokker C.XI
- Mitsubishi F1M

Related lists

- List of aircraft of World War II
- List of military aircraft of Germany
- List of seaplanes and flying boats
