= List of heavy cruisers of Germany =

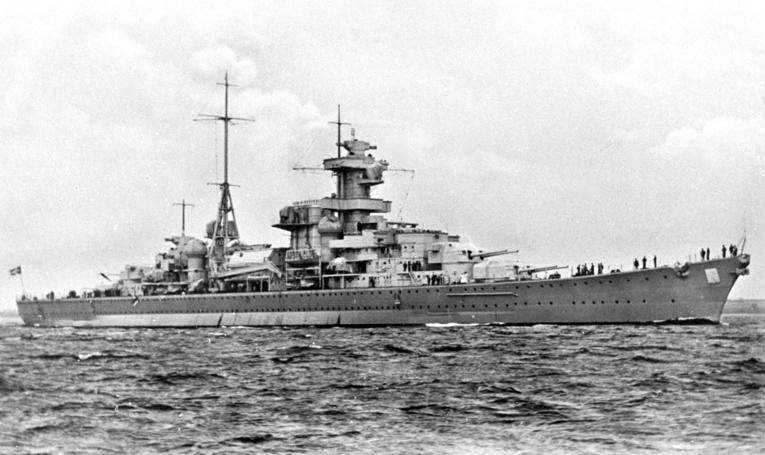
Blücher on sea trials

The German navies of the 1920s through 1945—the Reichsmarine and later Kriegsmarine—built or planned a series of heavy cruisers starting in the late 1920s, initially classified as Panzerschiffe (armored ships). Four different designs—the Deutschland, D, P, and Admiral Hipper classes, comprising twenty-two ships in total—were prepared in the period, though only the three Deutschland-class ships and three of the five Admiral Hipper–class cruisers were ever built.

The terms of the Treaty of Versailles, which ended World War I, limited German warships to a displacement of 10,000 long tons (10,160 t). The first class of ships designed under these restrictions was the Deutschland class, designed in the late 1920s, and commonly referred to as "pocket battleships". They incorporated a series of radical innovations to save weight, including extensive use of welded construction and diesel engines. An improved version, the D class, was planned for 1934, but escalating design requirements in response to the French Dunkerque-class battleships resulted in the replacement of the D class with the two Scharnhorst-class battleships.

Plans for an improved Panzerschiff were renewed in 1937 with the P class. Initially intended to comprise twelve ships, the P class was a central component of Grand Admiral Erich Raeder's Plan Z fleet, which was designed for a commerce war against Great Britain. Subsequent versions of Plan Z reduced the number of ships to eight and then removed them altogether, replacing them with the O-class battlecruisers by 1939. The five ships of the Admiral Hipper class were authorized under the terms of the Anglo-German Naval Agreement, signed in 1935, which permitted Germany 50,000 long tons (51,000 t) of heavy cruisers. Of these ships, only three were completed; the outbreak of World War II in September 1939 caused work to be halted on the last two ships.

In total, Germany completed six heavy cruisers, all of which saw extensive service with the fleet. The three Deutschland-class ships served on several non-intervention patrols during the Spanish Civil War in 1936–1938. Most of the heavy cruisers were used as commerce raiders during World War II, of which Admiral Scheer was the most successful; Admiral Graf Spee was scuttled after the Battle of the River Plate. Blücher was sunk by Norwegian coastal batteries during Operation Weserübung, the German invasion of Denmark and Norway, just four days after the ship joined the fleet. Seydlitz, one of the two incomplete Admiral Hipper–class ships, was intended to be converted into an aircraft carrier, though the work was never completed. Lützow, the second unfinished ship, was sold to the Soviet Union, and subsequently shelled German soldiers advancing on Leningrad until German bombers sank her. Deutschland—by now renamed Lützow—Admiral Scheer, and Admiral Hipper were all destroyed by British bombers at the end of the war; only Prinz Eugen survived the conflict. She was ceded to the US Navy as a war prize and used in nuclear testing at Bikini Atoll.

Key
Armament	The number and type of the primary armament
Armor	The maximum thickness of the armored belt
Displacement	Ship displacement at full combat load (Note: Historian Erich Gröner states that full load was defined as "[equal to] type displacement plus full load fuel oil, diesel oil, coal, reserve boiler feed water, aircraft fuel, and special equipment.")
Propulsion	Number of shafts, type of propulsion system, and top speed generated
Cost	Cost of the ship's construction
Service	The dates work began and finished on the ship and its ultimate fate
Laid down	The date the keel began to be assembled
Commissioned	The date the ship was Commissioned

== Deutschland class ==
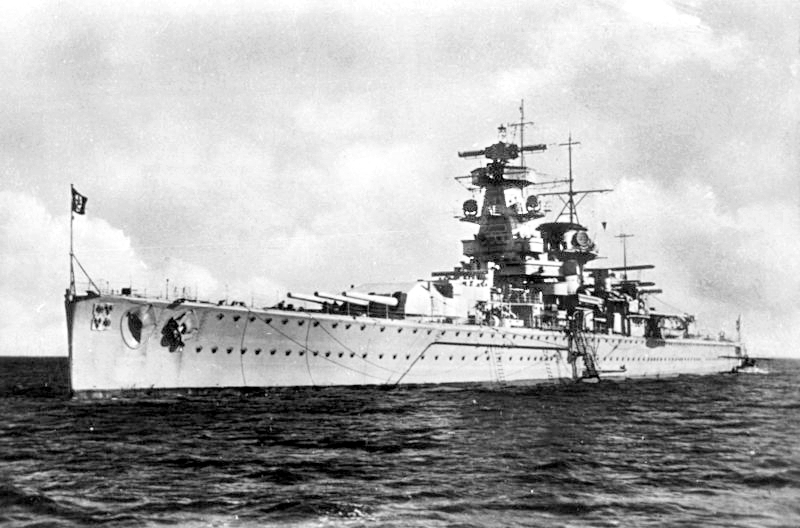
Admiral Graf Spee in 1936

Initially ordered as Panzerschiffe, the three Deutschland-class ships were designed to meet the limitations imposed on the German Navy by the Treaty of Versailles. The treaty limited large German warships to a displacement of 10,000 long tons (10,160 t), but did not restrict the caliber of main battery guns. Several innovations were incorporated into the design, including extensive use of welding and all-diesel propulsion, which saved weight and allowed for the heavier main armament and armor. Nevertheless, the ships exceeded the weight restriction by several thousand tons, though the German Navy claimed the vessels were within the limitations. The three ships, Deutschland, Admiral Scheer, and Admiral Graf Spee, were built between 1929 and 1936. Design changes were made over the course of the construction program, resulting in slightly differing characteristics of each ship.

Commonly referred to as "pocket battleships" due to their heavy armament, all three ships saw service in the non-intervention patrols during the Spanish Civil War in 1936–1938. They served as commerce raiders early in World War II; Admiral Graf Spee was scuttled outside Montevideo in December 1939 following the Battle of the River Plate. Deutschland conducted one cruise into the North Atlantic without significant success, before returning to Germany to be renamed Lützow. She and Admiral Scheer were also re-rated as heavy cruisers. She then participated in Operation Weserübung, where she was badly damaged by Norwegian coastal batteries and a British torpedo. After repairs, she was deployed to occupied Norway to operate against convoys to the Soviet Union. There she was joined by Admiral Scheer, which had completed the most successful raiding cruise conducted by a major surface unit. Both ships ultimately returned to German waters by the end of 1943, where they were sunk by British bombers in the final weeks of the war. Lützow was re-floated by the Soviet Navy and expended as a target in July 1947.

Summary of the Deutschland class
Ship	Armament	Armor	Displacement	Propulsion	Cost	Service		
Ship	Armament	Armor	Displacement	Propulsion	Cost	Laid down	Commissioned	Fate
Deutschland^{1}	6 × 28 cm SK C/28 guns	80 mm (3.1 in)	14,290 long tons (14,519 t)	2 shafts, 8 diesel engines, 28 kn (52 km/h; 32 mph)	80,000,000 Reichsmark	5 February 1929	19 May 1931	Sunk in Soviet weapons test, July 1947
Admiral Scheer	6 × 28 cm SK C/28 guns	80 mm (3.1 in)	15,180 long tons (15,424 t)	2 shafts, 8 diesel engines, 28 kn (52 km/h; 32 mph)	90,000,000 Reichsmark	25 June 1931	1 April 1933	Sunk on 9 April 1945, broken up for scrap
Admiral Graf Spee	6 × 28 cm SK C/28 guns	80 mm (3.1 in)	16,020 long tons (16,277 t)	2 shafts, 8 diesel engines, 28 kn (52 km/h; 32 mph)	82,000,000 Reichsmark	1 October 1932	30 June 1934	Scuttled on 17 December 1939

1: Renamed Lützow in late 1939

== D class ==
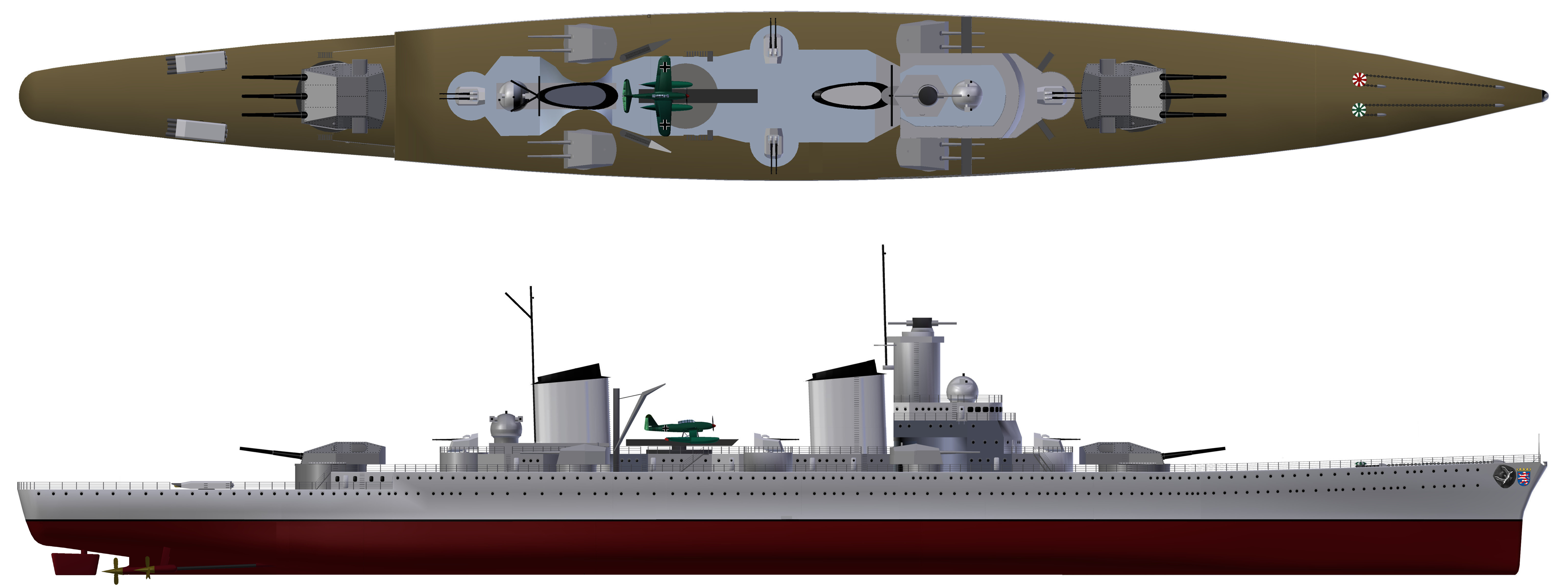
CG rendering of the D-class design

In 1933, German dictator Adolf Hitler authorized the Reichsmarine to order designs for an improved version of the preceding Deutschland-class cruisers. The ships were intended to counter a new French naval construction program. Displacement increased to 20,000 long tons (20,321 t), but Hitler only allowed increases to armor, prohibiting additions to the ships' main battery. Only one of the two ships was laid down, but it was canceled less than five months after the keel was laid. It was determined that the designs should be enlarged to counter the new French Dunkerque-class ships, which necessitated a third triple turret. The construction contracts for both ships were superseded by the two Scharnhorst-class battleships.

Summary of the D class
Ship	Armament	Armor	Displacement	Propulsion	Cost	Service		
Ship	Armament	Armor	Displacement	Propulsion	Cost	Laid down	Commissioned	Fate
D	6 × 28 cm guns	220 mm (8.7 in)	20,000 long tons (20,321 t) (Note: This figure is as designed; the combat displacement is unknown.)	Turbine propulsion, (Note: The details of the ships' propulsion system are unknown.) 29 kn (54 km/h; 33 mph)	—	14 February 1934	—	Work halted on 5 July 1934, broken up
E	6 × 28 cm guns	220 mm (8.7 in)	20,000 long tons (20,321 t)	Turbine propulsion, 29 kn (54 km/h; 33 mph)	—	—	—	Work not begun

== Admiral Hipper class ==
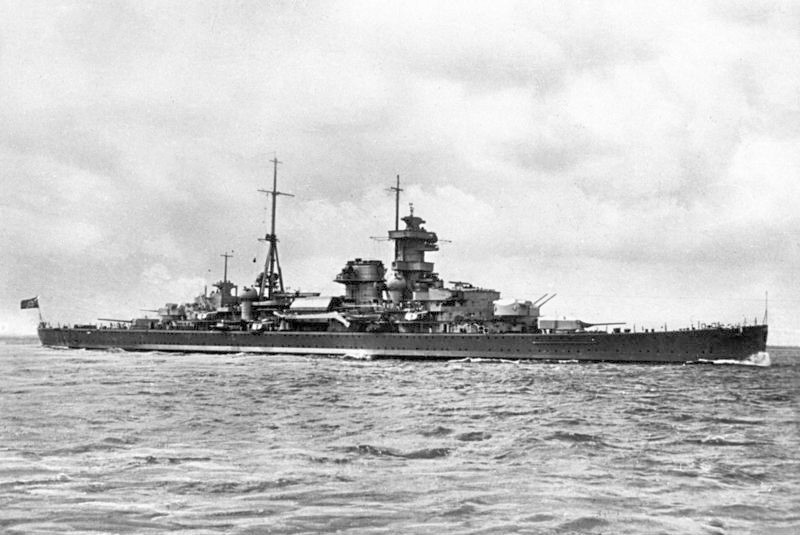
Admiral Hipper on trials

The Admiral Hipper class was the second and final group of heavy cruisers built by the German Navy. Their design was prepared in 1934–1936, while Germany was negotiating the Anglo-German Naval Agreement. The treaty, signed in 1935, permitted Germany to build 50,000 long tons (51,000 t) of heavy cruisers, enough for five 10,000 long ton ships. Of the five ships, only Admiral Hipper, Blücher, and Prinz Eugen were completed; Seydlitz was 95% complete when the decision was made to convert her into an aircraft carrier. The conversion was not completed, however, and the vessel was ceded to the Soviet Union and broken up for scrap. Lützow was sold, incomplete, to the Soviet Union in 1940. The ship, renamed Petropavlovsk, assisted in the defense of Leningrad during the German invasion of the Soviet Union before being damaged by German dive-bombers. After being raised and repaired, the ship continued in limited service until the late 1950s, when she was scrapped, either in 1958–1959, or 1960.

Admiral Hipper and Blücher both participated in the invasion of Norway; the latter was sunk by Norwegian coastal guns outside Oslo. After the operation, Admiral Hipper conducted two sorties into the North Atlantic to raid merchant shipping. Prinz Eugen joined the battleship Bismarck for a major operation in the Atlantic; she participated in the Battle of the Denmark Strait, which saw the battlecruiser HMS Hood destroyed. Bismarck was subsequently sunk during the operation, but Prinz Eugen successfully returned to port. After the Channel Dash in 1942, she joined Admiral Hipper in Norway. After arriving, Prinz Eugen was torpedoed by a British submarine, necessitating repairs in Germany. Admiral Hipper meanwhile saw action at the Battle of the Barents Sea at the end of 1942. Both ships returned to Germany and operated in the Baltic Sea in 1945. Admiral Hipper's crew scuttled the ship after she sustained heavy damage from RAF bombers. Prinz Eugen survived the war and was ceded as a war prize to the US Navy, which scuttled the ship after she survived two atomic bomb tests in the Bikini Atoll in 1946.

Summary of the Admiral Hipper class
Ship	Armament	Armor	Displacement	Propulsion	Cost	Service		
Ship	Armament	Armor	Displacement	Propulsion	Cost	Laid down	Commissioned	Fate
Admiral Hipper	8 × 20.3 cm SK C/34 guns	80 mm (3.1 in)	18,200 long tons (18,492 t)	3 shafts, 3 turbine engines, 28 kn (52 km/h; 32 mph)	87,855,000 Reichsmark	6 July 1935	29 April 1939	Scuttled 3 May 1945, broken up in 1948
Blücher	8 × 20.3 cm SK C/34 guns	80 mm (3.1 in)	18,200 long tons (18,492 t)	3 shafts, 3 turbine engines, 28 kn (52 km/h; 32 mph)	85,860,000 Reichsmark	15 August 1936	20 September 1939	Sunk on 9 April 1940
Prinz Eugen	8 × 20.3 cm SK C/34 guns	80 mm (3.1 in)	18,750 long tons (19,051 t)	3 shafts, 3 turbine engines, 28 kn (52 km/h; 32 mph)	104,490,000 Reichsmark	23 April 1936	1 August 1940	Sunk after US atomic tests, 22 December 1946
Seydlitz	8 × 20.3 cm SK C/34 guns	80 mm (3.1 in)	19,800 long tons (20,118 t)	3 shafts, 3 turbine engines, 28 kn (52 km/h; 32 mph)	84,000,000 Reichsmark	29 December 1936	—	Ceded to the Soviet Union, broken up after 1958
Lützow	8 × 20.3 cm SK C/34 guns	80 mm (3.1 in)	19,800 long tons (20,118 t)	3 shafts, 3 turbine engines, 28 kn (52 km/h; 32 mph)	83,590,000 Reichsmark	2 August 1937	—	Sold to the Soviet Union, broken up in 1958–1959 or 1960

== P class ==
The P class, which was to have comprised twelve ships, was authorized in 1937. Design work began that year and continued until 1939; at least nine designs were considered. The final design was armed with six 28 cm (11 in) quick-firing guns in two triple turrets, as in the preceding Deutschland class. The ships were designated as Panzerschiff, and given the preliminary names P1–P12. They were an improved design over the preceding planned D-class cruisers, which had been canceled in 1934. The new design was significantly heavier and faster, and returned to diesel propulsion, which significantly increased cruising range. The ships were part of the original version of Plan Z submitted by the Navy, and were the primary component of Grand Admiral Erich Raeder's plans for a commerce war against Britain. A revised version reduced the number of ships to eight, and another revision removed them entirely before work began, replacing them with three O-class battlecruisers. The O-class ships would have been significantly larger, faster, and more powerful. These ships, however, were also not built.

Summary of the P class
Ship	Armament	Armor	Displacement	Propulsion	Cost	Service		
Ship	Armament	Armor	Displacement	Propulsion	Cost	Laid down	Commissioned	Fate
P1–P12	6 × 28 cm guns	120 mm (4.7 in)	25,689 long tons (26,101 t)	12 diesel engines, 33 kn (61 km/h; 38 mph)	—	—	—	Canceled on 27 July 1939
