= P-class cruiser =

Proposed cruiser class of the German Navy

Class overview
- Operators: Kriegsmarine
- Preceded by: Admiral Hipper class
- Succeeded by: O class (planned)
- Planned: 12
- Completed: 0

General characteristics
- Type: Heavy cruiser
- Displacement: 22,145 t (21,795 long tons) (standard); 23,700 t (23,300 long tons) (design); 25,689 t (25,283 long tons) (full load)
- Length: 230 m (754 ft 7 in) overall; 223 m (731 ft 8 in) waterline
- Beam: 26 m (85 ft 4 in)
- Draft: 7.20 m (23 ft 7 in)
- Installed power: 165,000 PS (163,000 shp)
- Propulsion: 12 × diesel engines
- Speed: 33 knots (61 km/h; 38 mph)
- Range: 25,000 nmi (46,000 km; 29,000 mi) at 13 knots (24 km/h; 15 mph)
- Armament: 6 × 28 cm (11 in) guns; 4 × 15 cm (5.9 in) guns; 4 × 10.5 cm (4.1 in) AA guns; 4 × 3.7 cm (1.5 in) AA guns; 6 × 53.3 cm (21 in) torpedo tubes
- Armor: Barbettes: 80 to 100 mm (3.1 to 3.9 in); Belt: 40 to 120 mm (1.6 to 4.7 in); Deck: 70 mm (2.8 in); Torpedo bulkhead: 30 mm (1.2 in)
- Aircraft carried: 2 × Arado 196 seaplanes
- Aviation facilities: 2 × steam catapults

The P class was a planned group of twelve heavy cruisers of Nazi Germany's Kriegsmarine; they were the successor to the Deutschland-class cruisers. Design work began in 1937 and continued until 1939; at least twenty designs were submitted with nine of them being considered. There were three designs that were selected as the final contenders. One design was armed with six 283mm main guns in one triple turret forward and one more turret aft. It had two 150mm double secondary gun turrets as secondary armament with one being positioned above and just fore of the aft of the main 283mm main turret, and the other being in front and lower of the front main gun turret. This design had more beam than the other 2 designs. It also mounted 2 seaplanes on its fantail instead of the mid ship area. The final design was armed with six 28 cm (11 in) quick-firing guns in two triple turrets, as in the preceding Deutschland class. The ships were designated as Panzerschiff (armored ship), and given the preliminary names P1–P12. They were an improved design over the preceding planned D-class cruisers, which had been canceled in 1934. Although the ships were already assigned to shipyards, construction never began on the P-class ships after the O-class battlecruiser design superseded them.

== Design ==
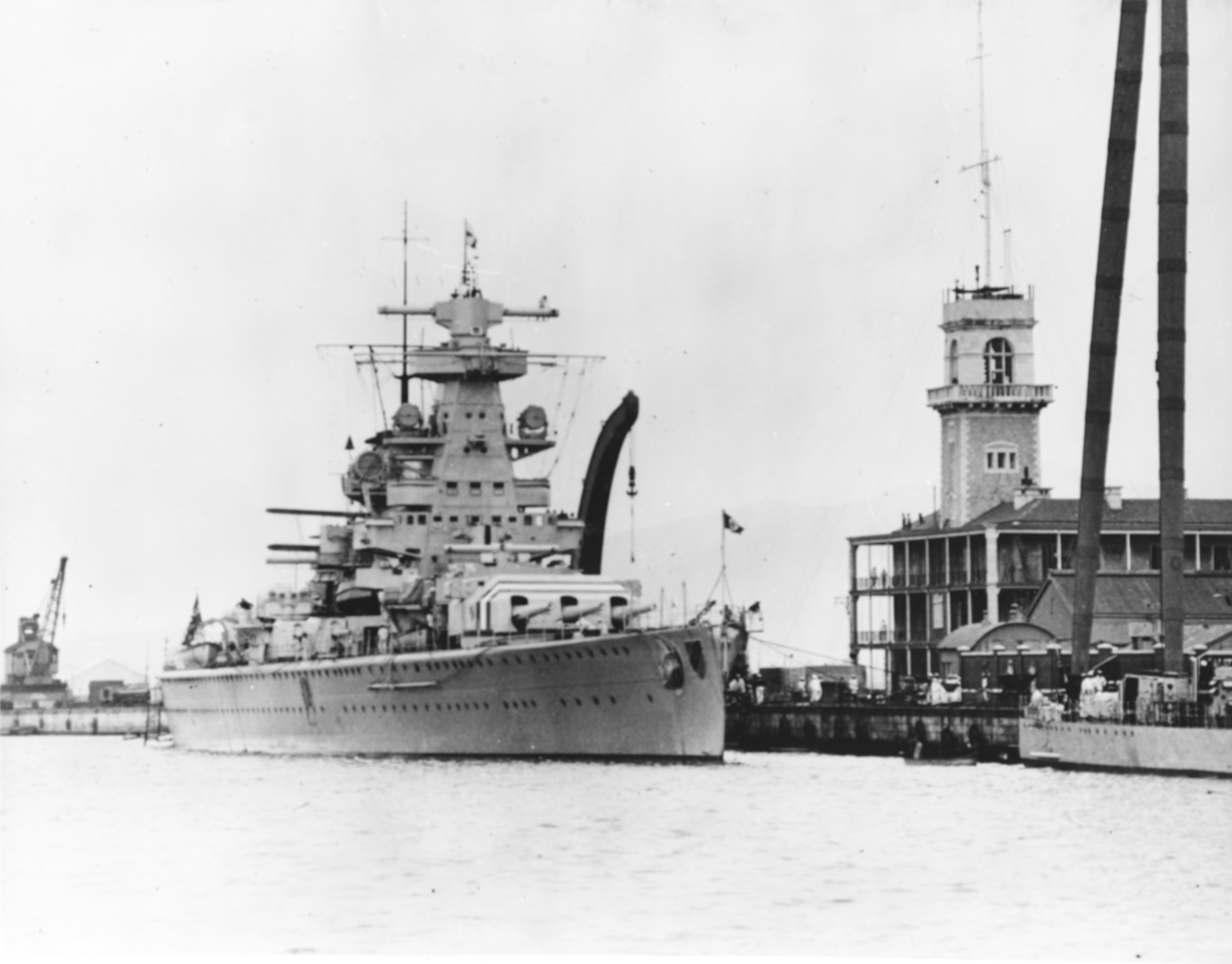
Admiral Scheer, one of the Deutschland-class cruisers, which provided the basis for the P-class design

In the early 1930s, Adolf Hitler began a rearmament program in Germany. He signed the Anglo-German Naval Agreement in 1935, which allowed Germany to build up its navy to 35 percent of the strength of the British Royal Navy and effectively repudiated the restrictions of the Treaty of Versailles on the German fleet. This led to a decision in 1937 to build ships to an improved Deutschland-class cruiser design, which were at that time classified as "panzerschiff" (armored ship). Design work on the new class of armored ships began that year. After more than twenty designs were evaluated to meet the navy's specifications, one was chosen; it was designated as cruiser "P". It called for a ship that displaced 20,000-metric-ton (19,684-long-ton), which had a maximum speed of 34 to 35 knots (63 to 65 km/h; 39 to 40 mph), and was armed with a main battery of six 28 cm (11 in) guns in two triple turrets.

By 1938, it became clear to Admiral Erich Raeder that Hitler's aggressive foreign policy would bring conflict with Britain. He therefore decided that a significantly larger force of armored ships would be necessary to execute an effective commerce raiding campaign against the British. Raeder's intention to fight a commerce war against Britain was the basis for Plan Z, which included twelve ships of the P-class design. The design work on the new ships proceeded in parallel with work on the O-class battlecruiser design. Experiments were conducted on at least nine different design proposals between March 1938 and December 1939. The designs varied somewhat in terms of dimensions as well as armament; some of the designs featured three 28 cm triple turrets.

Many problems were encountered with designing the ships, the most prevalent being armor. The required maximum speed of 34 kn (63 km/h; 39 mph) meant that the minimum length had to grow from the original 217 m (711 ft 11 in) to 229.50 m (752 ft 11 in). It also meant that the beam could be a minimum of 25 m (82 ft)—unless diesel engines, like those used in the Deutschland's, were desired; they would increase the beam by 2 m (6 ft 7 in). Unfortunately for the designers, the widened beam meant that an even longer hull was needed to maintain hydrodynamic efficiency. All of this complicated the armor arrangements, as more armor was needed to cover the hull as it grew in size. Eventually it was deemed that it was impossible to include diesel power on a 20,000-metric-ton displacement. The displacement limit was therefore increased to accommodate diesel engines.

Initially, twelve ships were ordered based on the P-class design. The ships were ordered under the provisional names P1 through P12; the contracts were awarded to a number of German shipyards, including Deutsche Werke in Kiel, Blohm & Voss in Hamburg, and the Kriegsmarinewerft in Wilhelmshaven. However, Plan Z was reduced in size, and the number of armored ships was pared down to only eight vessels. This caused several of the contracts to be shifted around amongst the various shipbuilding companies. The first keel was set to be laid on 1 February 1940. The revised version of Plan Z, approved on 27 July 1939, removed the P-class ships from the construction queue. Instead, the decision was made to build the O-class battlecruisers only, with the outbreak of World War II in September meaning that not even those vessels would be built.

=== General characteristics and machinery ===
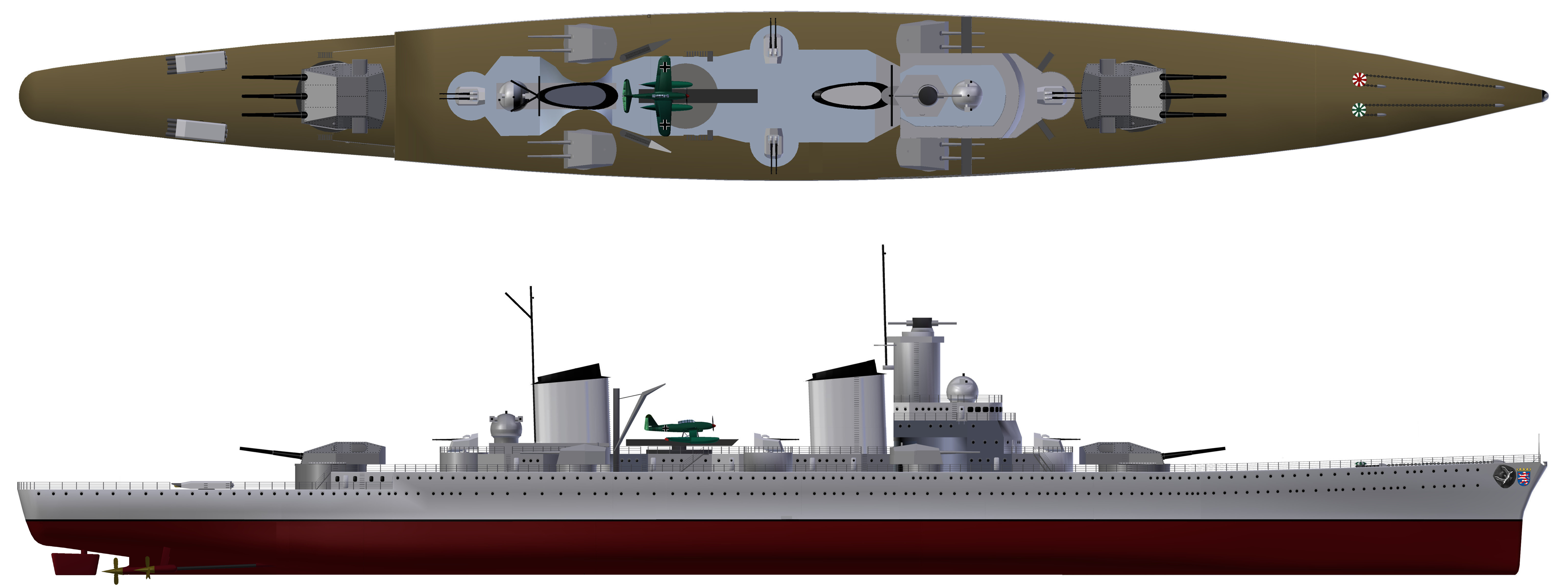
Depiction of the earlier D-class design; the P class was broadly similar, but differed in some respects, most notably the arrangement of the secondary and anti-aircraft armament

The P-class ships were to have been 223 m (731 ft 8 in) long at the waterline, and 230 m (754 ft 7 in) overall. The ships would have had a beam of 26 m (85 ft 4 in) and a designed draft of 7.20 m (23 ft 7 in); the maximum draft was to be 8 m (26 ft 3 in). The design featured a very long forecastle deck that extended for most of the length of the hull, terminating just forward of the aft main battery turret. They were to have incorporated longitudinal frame stringer steel construction, and would have been primarily welded to save weight. The ships would have had thirteen watertight compartments and a transom stern. The forward superstructure consisted of a large, armored conning tower with a heavy tower mast; a smaller secondary conning tower with a pole mast was located further aft. The ships were to have been equipped with two catapults on the quarterdeck, arranged side-by-side, perpendicular to the centerline. Each catapult carried an Arado 196 seaplane.

The ships were designed to be equipped with twelve MAN 9-cylinder V-configuration double acting two-stroke diesel engines, which were arranged in four sets of three, each of which drove one of four shafts. The shafts each turned a screw that was 4.3 m (14 ft) in diameter. Smoke from the diesels would have been vented through a pair of large funnels amidships. The propulsion system was rated to produce a top speed of 33 knots (61 km/h; 38 mph) from 165,000 metric horsepower (163,000 shp). The ships were designed to carry 3,600 metric tons (3,500 long tons) of fuel oil, but were capable of storing up to 5,000 t (4,900 long tons). At a cruising speed of 13 knots (24 km/h; 15 mph), this enabled a maximum range of 25,000 nautical miles (46,000 km; 29,000 mi); at 19 knots (35 km/h; 22 mph), the range was reduced to 15,000 nmi (28,000 km; 17,000 mi).

=== Armament and armor ===
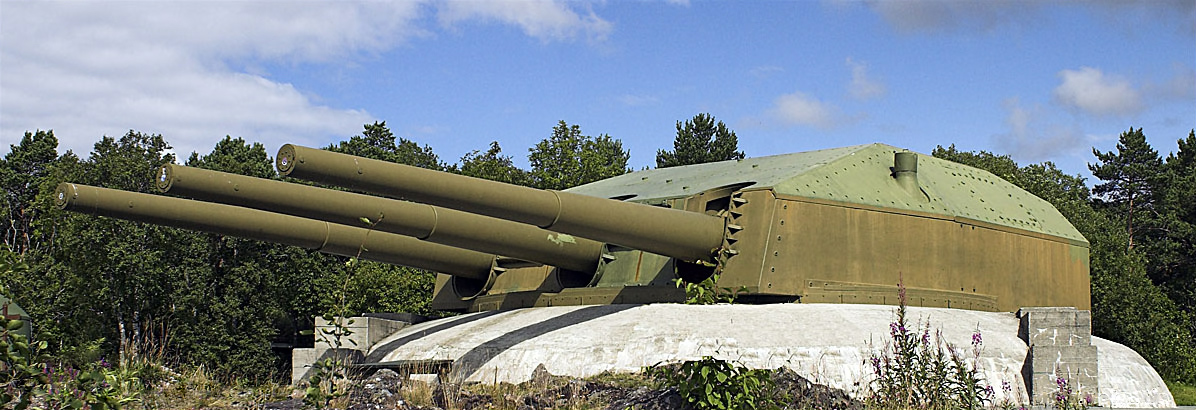
A main battery turret of Gneisenau, a Scharnhorst-class battleship, installed as coastal artillery in Norway; the P-class ships may have carried similar turrets

The ships were armed with a main battery of six 28 cm (11 in) quick-firing guns mounted in two triple turrets, one fore and one aft on the centerline. It is not known if these were to have been the same 28 cm SK C/28 guns as the preceding Deutschland-class cruisers, or the 28 cm SK C/34 guns used by the Scharnhorst-class battleships. The ships were also armed with a secondary battery of four 15 cm (5.9 in)/L55 guns in two twin turrets, also mounted on the centerline, fore and aft. The fore 28 cm turret would have been superfiring over the fore 15 cm turret; the layout was reversed for the aft pair of turrets. The 15 cm twin turrets were C/34 mounts—the same type as those fitted to the Bismarck- and Scharnhorst-class battleships, as well as a number of other designs. The turrets allowed depression to −10 degrees and elevation to 40 degrees, which enabled a maximum range of 22,000 m (24,000 yd). The 15 cm guns had a rate of fire of between 6 and 8 45.3 kg (100 lb) rounds per minute, at a muzzle velocity of 875 meters per second (2,871 ft/s). The guns used two propellant charges: a 14.15 kg (31.2 lb) RPC/38 fore charge and a 23.5 kg (52 lb) main charge in a brass cartridge.

The P-class ships were to have mounted a fairly small anti-aircraft battery: four 10.5 cm (4.1 in)/L65 high-angle guns and four 3.7 cm (1.5 in) Flak guns. The 10.5 cm guns were carried in four twin turrets, one pair abreast the forward conning tower and the other on either side of the rear funnel. These guns fired two types of projectiles: a 15.1 kg (33 lb) high explosive shell and a 15.8 kg (35 lb) incendiary round. Both types of ammunition used a single propellant charge: the 5.2 kg (11 lb) RPC/32 charge. The guns could elevate to 80 degrees, and could hit targets 12,500 m (13,700 yd) away. The ships were also armed with six 53.3 cm (21 in) submerged torpedo tubes.

The armor layout was to have used Krupp cemented steel, but the design was not complete; only broad requirements are known. The main armored deck was 70 mm (2.8 in) thick on the flat, with 100 mm (3.9 in)–thick plate on sides, where it sloped downward to connect to the bottom of the armor belt. The upper deck was 20 mm (0.79 in) thick. The two main-battery barbettes had armor protection that ranged between 80 mm (3.1 in) and 100 mm thick, and had a depth of 14.20 m (46 ft 7 in). The armored belt was 120 mm (4.7 in) thick over the vital areas of the ship, and tapered down to 40 mm (1.6 in) in less critical areas.
