= 28 cm SK C naval gun =

28 cm SK C/nn refers to a German 28 cm naval gun, with C/nn referring to the year of design:

- 28 cm SK C/28 naval gun : 28 cm 52-calibers gun designed in 1928, mounted on the Deutschland class "pocket battleships"
- 28 cm SK C/34 naval gun : 28 cm 54.5-calibers gun designed in 1934, mounted on Scharnhorst class battleships
