= Plan Z =

German plan to build a massive navy before World War II

Plan Z (German: Z-Plan) was the re-equipment and expansion of the Kriegsmarine (German navy) ordered by Adolf Hitler in early 1939. The fleet was meant to challenge the naval power of the United Kingdom, and was to be completed by 1948. Development of the plan began in 1938, but it reflected the evolution of the strategic thinking of the Oberkommando der Marine (Naval High Command) over the two decades following World War I. The plan called for a fleet centered on ten battleships and four aircraft carriers which were intended to battle the Royal Navy. This force would be supplemented with numerous long-range cruisers that would attack British shipping. A relatively small force of U-boats was also stipulated.

When World War II broke out in September 1939, almost no work had been done on the new ships ordered under Plan Z. The need to shift manufacturing capacity to more pressing requirements forced the Kriegsmarine to abandon the construction program, and only a handful of major ships—all of which had been ordered before Plan Z—were completed during the war. Nevertheless, the plan still had a significant effect on the course of World War II, in that only a few dozen U-boats had been completed by the outbreak of war. Admiral Karl Dönitz's U-boat fleet did not reach the 300 U-boats he deemed necessary to win a commerce war against Britain until 1943, by which time his forces had been decisively defeated.

== Naval construction under the Versailles Treaty ==
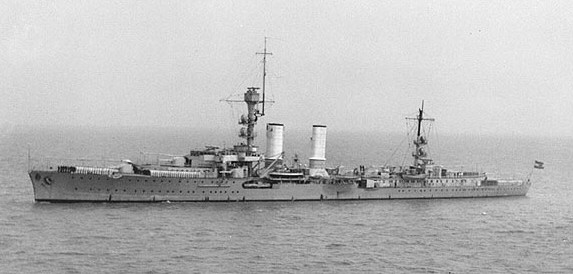
Emden, the first major warship built after World War I

Following the end of World War I, the German armed forces became subject to the restrictions of the Treaty of Versailles. For the new Reichsmarine, this meant it was limited to six pre-dreadnought battleships, six old light cruisers, 12 destroyers and 12 torpedo boats. A further two pre-dreadnoughts, two cruisers, and four destroyers and torpedo boats apiece could be kept in reserve. The first major ship to be built after the war was the light cruiser Emden in the early 1920s. This was followed by a further three light cruisers of the Königsberg class: Königsberg, Karlsruhe and Köln, and a further two ships that were modified versions of the Königsberg class, Leipzig and Nürnberg. At the same time, the Germans created a dummy corporation, NV Ingenieurskantoor voor Scheepsbouw (IvS), in the Netherlands to secretly continue development of submarines. This was in violation of Article 191 of the Treaty of Versailles, which prohibited Germany from possessing or building submarines for any purpose. IvS built several submarines for foreign navies, including the Turkish Gür, which was the basis for the Type I U-boat, and the Finnish Vesikko, which was the prototype for the Type II U-boat.

The Treaty also stipulated that Germany could replace its pre-dreadnought battleships after they reached twenty years of age, but new vessels could displace no more than 10,000 long tons (10,160 t). In response to these limitations, the Germans attempted to build a powerful heavy cruiser—classified as a panzerschiff (armored ship)—that outclassed the new heavy cruisers built by Britain and France. While British and French heavy cruiser designs were bound by the Washington Naval Treaty (and subsequent London Naval Treaty) to a caliber of 20.3 cm (8 in) on a displacement of 10,000 tons, the Germans chose to arm Deutschland with six 28 cm (11 in) guns. The Germans hoped that by building a ship significantly more powerful than the Allies had, they could force the Allies to admit Germany to the Washington treaty system in exchange for cancelling Deutschland, thereby abrogating the naval limitations imposed by Versailles. The French vehemently opposed any concessions to Germany, and therefore, Deutschland and two further units—Admiral Scheer and Admiral Graf Spee—were built.

In 1932, the Reichsmarine secured the passage of the Schiffbauersatzplan ("Replacement ship construction program") through the Reichstag. The program called for two separate production phases, the first from 1930 to 1936, and the second from 1936 to 1943. The latter phase was secretly intended to break the Versailles restrictions. The following year, Adolf Hitler became the Chancellor of Germany. He unilaterally withdrew from the restrictions of the Treaty of Versailles and began the systematic re-building of the armed forces. The prestige brought by the Panzerschiffe led to two improved vessels, the D class, to be ordered. These ships were cancelled and reordered as the battleships Scharnhorst and Gneisenau, which were 32,000-long-ton (32,510 t) ships armed with nine 28 cm guns and much greater armor protection than their predecessors. In 1935, Hitler signed the Anglo-German Naval Agreement, which permitted Germany to build up to 35 percent of the strength of the Royal Navy in all warship categories. The initial designs for two follow-on ships—the Bismarck class—initially called for a displacement of 35,000 long tons (36,000 t) with 13 in (330 mm) guns, but to counter the two new, French Richelieu-class battleships, the new ships were significantly enlarged, to a displacement of over 41,000 long tons (42,000 t) and 15 in (380 mm) guns.

== Operational philosophies and development ==
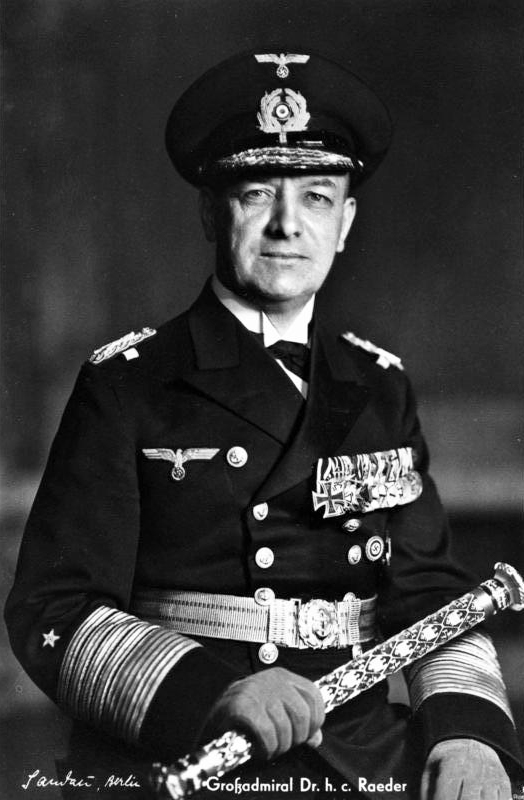
Erich Raeder, commander of the Kriegsmarine until 1943

The postwar German navy was conflicted over what direction future construction should take. In September 1920, Konteradmiral (Rear Admiral) William Michaelis issued a memorandum laying out the goals of the new Reichsmarine; these goals emphasized coastal defense rather than significant expansion. The German Army viewed Poland as the primary future enemy, and the Navy assumed that in a conflict with Poland, France would support Poland. Thus, the French Navy would be the most likely opponent for the Reichsmarine; Britain was expected to remain neutral in such a conflict. The construction of warships through the mid-1930s was primarily directed against the perceived French threat. Any hypothetical U-boats would generally support the main fleet rather than embark on a commerce-raiding campaign, and any raiding would be done strictly according to cruiser rules. This view remained the established orthodoxy until the mid-1930s, when then-Kapitän zur See (Captain at Sea) Karl Dönitz came to command the U-boat arm. Dönitz advocated a return to unrestricted submarine warfare and the adoption of wolfpack tactics to overwhelm convoy defenses.

In the 1920s, the question arose over what to do with the cruisers that would presumably be abroad on training cruises when a war would break out. The high command decided that they should operate as independent commerce raiders. When Vizeadmiral (Vice Admiral) Erich Raeder became the head of the Reichsmarine in 1928, he fully endorsed the concept of long-range surface raiders. This was in large part due to his service in World War I as the chief of staff to Vizeadmiral Franz von Hipper, where he saw the fleet rendered impotent by the crushing British naval superiority. By the late 1930s, Hitler's aggressive foreign policy made conflict with Britain increasingly likely, particularly after the Munich crisis of September 1938. The path toward a major fleet expansion was paved shortly thereafter, on 14 October, when Generalfeldmarschall (Field Marshal) Hermann Göring announced a colossal armament program to dramatically increase the size and power of the German armed forces. The plan was to be completed by 1942, by which time Hitler planned to go to war against the Anglo-French alliance. He nevertheless assured Raeder that war would not come until 1948.

Hitler ordered that completion of Bismarck and Tirpitz be expedited, along with six new H-class battleships yet to be laid down. These eight battleships would form the core of a new battle fleet capable of engaging the British Royal Navy. Raeder meanwhile believed that Britain could be more easily defeated through the surface raider strategy he favored. The initial version of his plan was based on the assumption that the fleet should be centered on panzerschiffe, long-range cruisers, and U-boats to attack British commerce. These forces would tie down British naval power and allow a smaller number of battleships to operate in the North Sea. This first draft was called Plan X; a pared-down revision was renamed Plan Y, but Hitler rejected Raeder's proposed construction plan. This led to Plan Z, which featured the more balanced fleet centered on the battleships Hitler sought, which he approved on 27 January 1939. In addition to the six new battleships Hitler demanded, the plan called for eight new panzerschiffe of the Deutschland type and 249 U-boats, with construction spread over the following nine years. By 1948, the German fleet was to include a total of 797 ships; the cost of the program amounted to 33 billion reichsmarks spent over the span of nine years. Further revisions to the numbers of cruisers and other craft were approved on 1 March. Raeder nevertheless retained his operation philosophy of using the battleships and aircraft carriers in task forces to support the panzerschiffe and light cruisers attacking British merchant traffic, rather than directly attacking the Royal Navy in a pitched battle.

== The plan ==
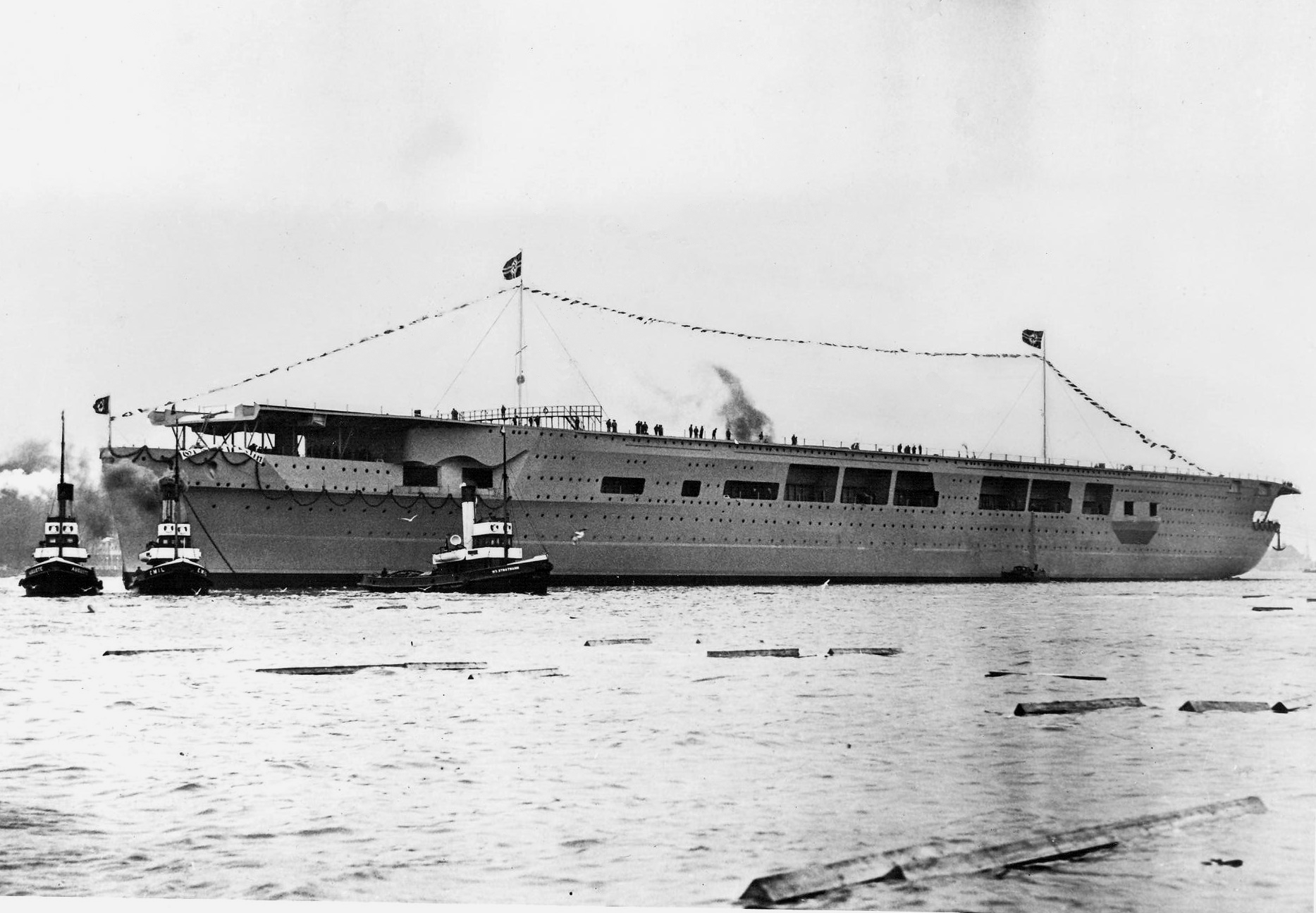
Graf Zeppelin at her launching

The plan, approved by Hitler on 27 January 1939, called for a surface fleet composed of the following vessels, which included all new ships built in the 1920s and 1930s:

Type	Projected	Completed
Battleships	10	4
Battlecruisers	3	0
Aircraft carriers	4	0
Panzerschiffe	15	3
Heavy cruisers	5	3
Light cruisers	13	6
Scout cruisers	22	0
Destroyers	68	30
Torpedo boats	90	36
Total	230	82

These figures included the four Scharnhorst- and Bismarck-class battleships already built or building, the three Deutschland-class panzerschiffe and the six light cruisers already in service. To complete the core of the Plan Z fleet, six H-class battleships, three O-class battlecruisers, twelve P-class panzerschiffe, and two Graf Zeppelin-class aircraft carriers with two more of a new design, were to be built. The five ships of the Admiral Hipper class fulfilled the mandate for heavy cruisers, while the M class of light cruisers would fulfill the requirement for light cruisers. The Spähkreuzer 1938 design would form the basis for the fleet scouts ordered in the program. The plan also called for extensive upgrades to Germany's naval infrastructure to accommodate the new fleet; larger dry docks were to be built at Wilhelmshaven and Hamburg, and much of the island of Rügen was to be removed to provide a large harbor in the Baltic. Plan Z was given the highest priority of all industrial projects. On 27 July 1939, Raeder revised the plan to cancel all twelve of the P-class panzerschiffe.

In the short time from the introduction of Plan Z to the beginning of war with the United Kingdom on 3 September only two of the plan's large ships, a pair of H class battleships, were laid down; material for the other four ships had started to be assembled in preparation to begin construction but no work had been done. At the time components of the three battlecruisers were in production, but their keels had not yet been laid down. Two of the M-class cruisers had been laid down, but they were also cancelled in late September. Work on Graf Zeppelin was cancelled definitively in 1943 when Hitler finally abandoned the surface fleet after the Battle of the Barents Sea debacle.

== Impact on World War II ==
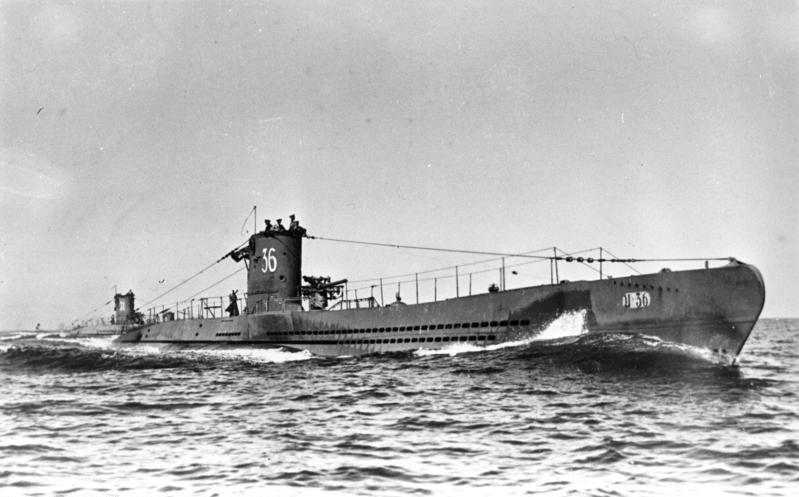
U-36, a Type VII U-boat

Since the plan was cancelled less than a year after it was approved, the positive effects on German naval construction were minimal. All of the ships authorized by the plan were cancelled after the outbreak of war, with only a few major surface vessels that predated the plan completed during the conflict. These included Bismarck and Tirpitz, along with the heavy cruisers Blücher and Prinz Eugen. Without the six H-class battleships or the four aircraft carriers, the Kriegsmarine was once again unable to meet the Royal Navy on equal terms.

Most of the heavy ships of the Kriegsmarine were used as commerce raiders in the early years of the war. Two of the panzerschiffe, Deutschland and Graf Spee, were already at sea at the outbreak of war; the former found little success and the latter was ultimately trapped and forced to scuttle after the Battle of the River Plate in December 1939. From October 1940 to March 1941, Admiral Scheer went on her own raiding operation and captured or sank seventeen ships, which made her the most successful of the German capital ship surface raiders in the entire war. Scharnhorst and Gneisenau conducted Operation Berlin, a major sortie into the Atlantic in early 1941. Bismarck and Prinz Eugen went on the last Atlantic raiding mission, Operation Rheinübung, in May 1941. Bismarck sank the British battlecruiser HMS Hood but was herself sunk three days later. The loss of Bismarck led Hitler to prohibit further sorties into the Atlantic; the remaining capital ships were concentrated in Norway for use as a fleet in being and to threaten convoys to the Soviet Union on the Murmansk Run.

Despite the fact that Plan Z produced no new warships in time for World War II, the plan represented the strategic thinking of the Oberkommando der Marine (OKM—"Naval High Command") at the time. Most significantly, the OKM favored surface combatants over the U-boats Dönitz needed for his submarine campaign in the North Atlantic, which left him with only a handful of submarines at the start of war. The two Scharnhorst-class battleships cost close to 150 million reichsmarks apiece, and the two Bismarck-class ships cost nearly 250 million reichsmarks each; for this amount of money, the Germans could have built more than a hundred additional Type VII U-boats. The shift to the submarine war was not definitively made until 1943, by which time the campaign had already been lost.

The feasibility of the plan had never been considered by Raeder and Kriegsmarine planners; construction of the ships themselves was not a concern, assuming sufficient time had been available. But securing the fuel oil necessary to operate the fleet likely was an insurmountable problem. Fuel consumption would have more than quadrupled between 1936 and the completion of the program in 1948, from 1.4 million tons to approximately 6 million tons. And the navy would have to construct some 9.6 million tons worth of storage facilities for enough fuel reserves to allow for just a year of wartime operations; longer conflicts would of course necessitate an even larger stockpile. Compared to the combined fuel requirements of the Kriegsmarine, Heer (Army), Luftwaffe (Air Force), and the civilian economy, the projected domestic production by 1948 of less than 2 million tons of oil and 1.34 million tons of diesel fuel is absurdly low.
