= D-class cruiser =

D-class cruiser can refer to either of the following:

- Danae-class cruiser, a series of British light cruisers that served during World War II
- D-class cruiser (Germany), a pair of planned large cruisers designed as part of Plan Z
