= O-class battlecruiser =

Proposed battlecruiser class of the German Navy

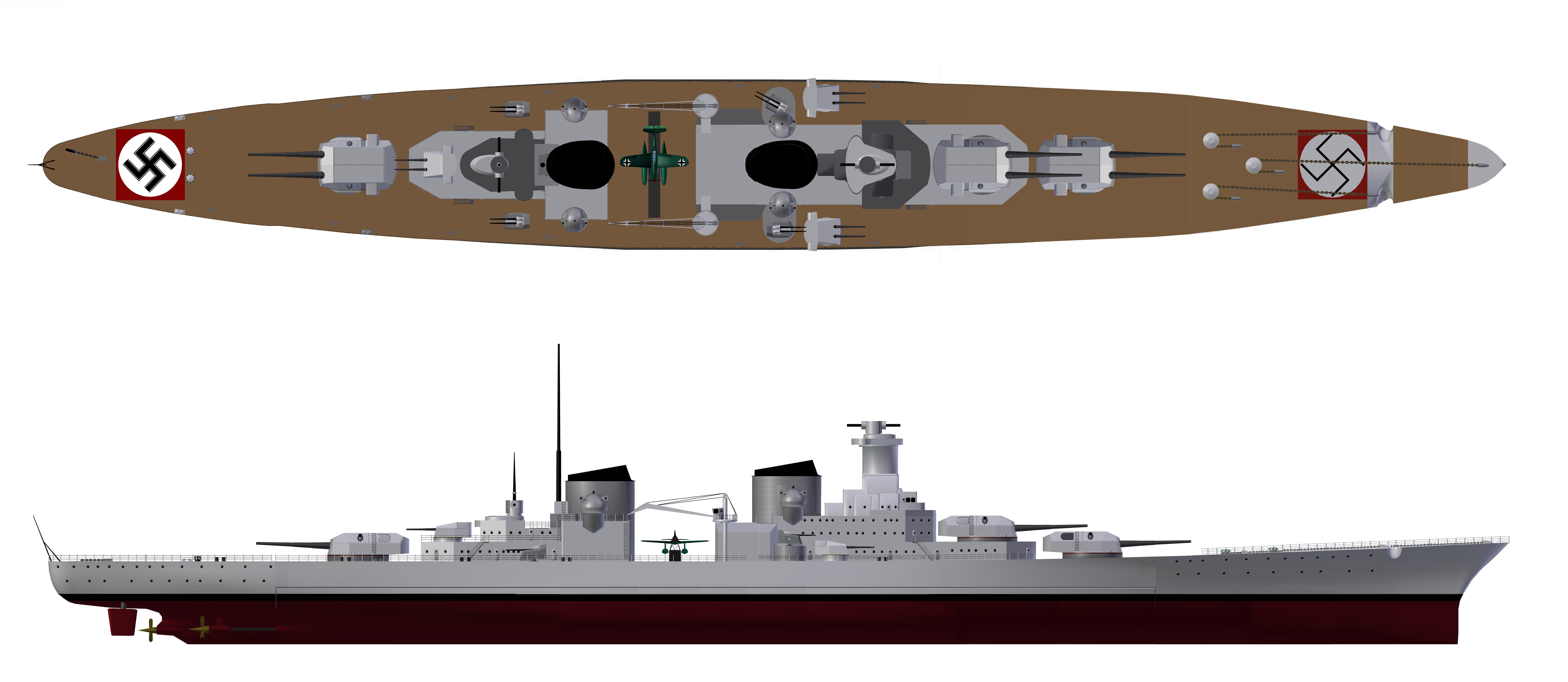
- Line-drawing of the O-class battlecruiser concept.

Class overview
- Operators: Kriegsmarine
- Preceded by: Ersatz Yorck class
- Planned: 3
- Cancelled: 3

General characteristics
- Type: Battlecruiser
- Displacement: Standard: 28,900 long tons (29,364 t); Full load: 35,400 long tons (35,968 t)
- Length: 256 m (839 ft 11 in) (overall); 248.2 m (814 ft 4 in) (waterline)
- Beam: 30 m (98 ft 5 in)
- Draft: 8.02 m (26 ft 4 in)
- Installed power: 4 × Wagner boilers; Diesel engines: 116,000 shp (87,000 kW); Steam turbine: 60,000 shp (45,000 kW)
- Propulsion: 8 × 24 cylinder diesel engines; 1 × Brown, Boveri & Cie steam turbine set
- Speed: 35 knots (65 km/h; 40 mph)
- Range: 14,000 nmi (26,000 km; 16,000 mi) at 19 knots (35 km/h; 22 mph)
- Complement: 65 officers; 1,900 men
- Armament: 6 × 38 cm (15 in) SK C/34 guns; 6 × 15 cm (5.9 in) guns; 8 × 10.5 cm SK C/33 AA; 8 × 3.7 cm SK C/30 AA; 20 × 2 cm SK C/30 AA; 6 × 53.3 cm (21 in) torpedo tubes
- Armor: Belt: 190 mm (7.5 in); Deck: 80 mm (3.1 in); Turrets: 210 mm (8.3 in); Torpedo bulkhead: 45 mm (1.8 in)
- Aircraft carried: 4 × Arado Ar 196 seaplanes
- Aviation facilities: 1 × double catapult; 3 × hangars

The O class was a planned class of three battlecruisers for the Kriegsmarine (German navy) before World War II. Prompted by a perceived lack in ship numbers when compared with the British Royal Navy, the O class' design was born with the suggestion of modifying the P-class cruiser design with 380 mm (15 in) guns instead of 283 mm (11.1 in).

The ships were incorporated into the 1939 Plan Z for the re-equipment and expansion of the Kriegsmarine; while an aircraft carrier, H-class battleships and smaller ships engaged convoy escorts, one or more O-class ships would attack the merchant ships.

The O class' design reflected their intended role; a heavy main armament (six 380 mm guns in three dual turrets) for possible encounters with escorting 203 mm (8 in)-armed heavy cruisers, enough armor to defend against the same and nothing more, and a high top speed so that they could get away from slower but much better armored capital ships.

Although planned and ordered, construction did not progress due to lack of materials and higher priorities for ship construction.

== Development ==
=== Genesis: P-class cruisers ===
Even with the completion of the two Scharnhorst-class battleships and the construction of two Bismarck-class battleships, the German Navy had fewer ships than other European navies. This led to a decision in 1937 to build ships to an improved Deutschland-class design. After more than twenty designs were considered to meet the navy's specifications, (Note: The exact specifications, taken from Garzke & Dulin: 20,000 tonnes (20,000 long tons) displacement, six 283 mm (11.1 in), four 150 mm (5.9 in), eight 105 mm (4.1 in), a maximum speed of 34–35 knot, a 15,000 mi (24,000 km) range at 19 knots, 120 mm (4.7 in) side belt with a 60 mm (2.4 in) belt to the bow and a 110 mm (4.3 in) sloping towards the stern.) one was chosen; it was designated as cruiser "P" (the "P" for panzer — German: "armor"). Under the original plan, twelve P-class ships were to be built. The ships were designed as cruiser killers that would have heavy enough armament and armor to take on light and heavy cruisers but enough speed to outrun battleships and battlecruisers.

Many problems were encountered with designing the ships, the most prevalent being armor. The required maximum speed of 34 knots (63 km/h; 39 mph) meant that the minimum length had to grow from the original 217 to 229.5 m (712 to 753 ft). It also meant that the beam could be a minimum of 25 m (82 ft)—unless diesel engines, like those used in the Deutschland's, were desired; they would increase the beam by 2 m (6 ft 7 in). Unfortunately for the designers, the widened beam meant that an even longer hull was needed to maintain hydrodynamic efficiency. All of this complicated the armor arrangements, as more armor was needed to cover the longer length and widened beam. Eventually it was deemed that it was impossible to include diesel power on a 20,000-metric-ton (20,000-long-ton) displacement.

The switch to battlecruisers was the result of a proposal to up the main armament from 283 mm (11.1 in) 55 caliber-long guns to 380 mm (15 in)/47-caliber guns. Various reasons were behind this. Among other reasons, experiments showed that the smaller gun was "far less effective" than the larger gun, a class of twelve ships would have overtaxed the shipyards already heavily burdened with other ships, and the smallest guns on any foreign capital ship in service or under construction were more than 20 mm (0.79 in) larger in caliber than the 283 mm guns. (Note: These were 305 mm (12 in) guns on the American First World War-era Wyoming-class battleships. In addition, five Italian battleships had or were in the process of replacing 305 mm guns with a smaller number of 320 mm (12.6 in) guns.) The most persuasive argument for increasing the armament came in 1939, when Adolf Hitler denounced the 1935 Anglo-German Naval Agreement.

=== Battlecruisers ===
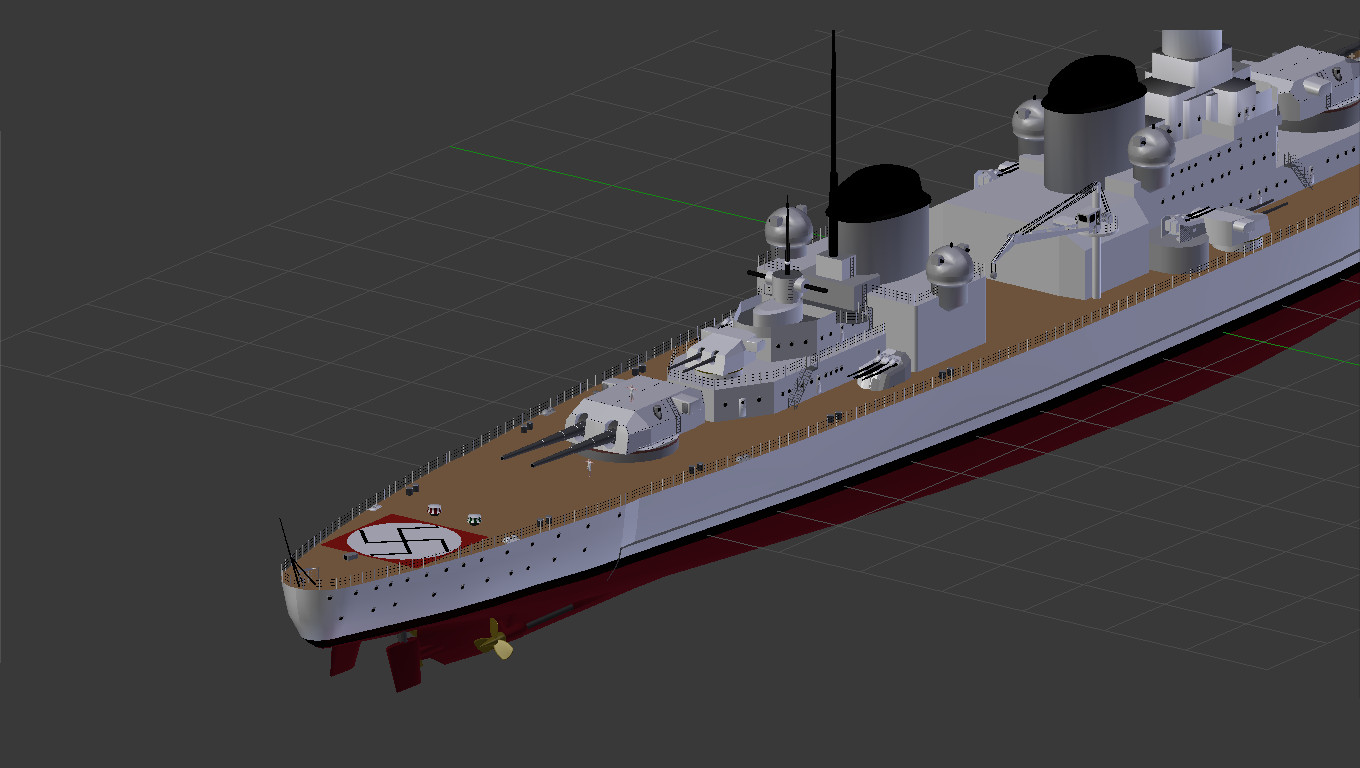
The stern and amidships portion of the O class

Although interest in the P-class ships and the battlecruiser proposal waned for a time in late 1937 and early 1938, it was quickly revived on 28 April 1938 with Hitler's public airing of his views on the 1935 Anglo-German Treaty and the consequent increased possibility of war with the United Kingdom. Calling the Naval Staff and Admiral Erich Raeder to him, Hitler laid out his thoughts of a strong navy that could pose enough danger to the British such that they would enter into an alliance with Germany rather than go to war. As decided here, Plan Z entailed two task forces each centered on three H-class battleships and one aircraft carrier, with cruisers and destroyers as escorts. In war, these forces would collaborate with the three battlecruisers by occupying convoy screens while U-boats and one or more of the O class destroyed the cargo-carrying merchant ships. The presence of the battlecruisers operating at large would have the secondary effect of forcing the Royal Navy to deploy battleships as convoy escorts, thus weakening any fleet that could engage the Plan Z task forces.

As part of the plan, design work on the P class was halted in mid-1939 in favor of the O class. Displacement was limited to 30,000 t (30,000 long tons) in the new designs so that the length of construction would be shortened from the normal four or more years that a battleship required, to an estimated three to three and a half years. Required characteristics for the battlecruisers was a displacement of 30,000 t (29,526 long tons), a main battery of six 380 mm (15 in) guns, a secondary battery of dual purpose guns, a top speed of 34 knots (63 km/h; 39 mph), a range of 15,000 nmi (28,000 km) at 19 knots (35 km/h; 22 mph), and enough armor to counter the 203 mm (8 in) guns of heavy cruisers.

Like the P class, there were problems with fitting an all-diesel drive into the hull of the ships. It was enough that the design team decided that it would not be prudent to use an all-diesel arrangement; instead, a hybrid diesel-steam turbine propulsion plant was to be used. The change allowed the central armored citadel to be reduced by 9 m (30 ft) and the aft beam to be lowered by 3.5 m (11 ft).

Although plans were not finalized, the third battlecruiser, "Q", was ordered from Germaniawerft in Kiel on 8 August 1939. One month after, the contract design was refined. The displacement was increased to 31,652 t (31,152 long tons) (design) and 35,945 t (35,377 long tons) (full-load), while the draft at those two figures was 8 and 8.8 m (26 and 29 ft), respectively. At the waterline, the length was set at 246 m (807 ft) and beam at 30 m (98 ft). The main battery was the same as previously (six 380 mm (15 in)/47-caliber guns in dual turrets), while the secondary battery was split between six paired 150 mm (5.9 in)/48-caliber anti-surface guns and paired 105 mm (4.1 in)/65-caliber anti-aircraft guns because German designers had not been able to develop a satisfactory dual-purpose gun. Light anti-aircraft guns were eight 37 mm in four dual mounts and twenty 20 mm autocannon in single mounts. Twelve 533 mm (21 in) torpedo tubes finished out the armament aboard the ships. Four floatplanes for scouting were planned. At the design displacement, the maximum speed was reduced by half a knot, to 33.5 knots (62.0 km/h; 38.6 mph); this required a top shaft horsepower of 173,600.

By 1940, project drawings for the three battlecruisers were complete. They were reviewed by both Hitler and Raeder, both of whom approved. However, outside "initial procurement of materials and the issuance of some procurement orders", the ships' keels were never laid down. In large part, this was due to severe material shortages, especially of high-grade steel, since there were more pressing needs for these materials for the war effort. In addition, the dockyard personnel necessary for the ships' construction were by now occupied with more important work, primarily on new U-boats.

== Specifications ==
=== General characteristics ===
The final design, which was completed by 1940, called for a ship that was 248.2 m (814 ft 4 in) long at the waterline and 256 m (839 ft 11 in) long overall. The planned ships had a beam of 30 m (98 ft 5 in) and a designed draft of 8.02 m (26 ft 4 in). The ships' designed displacement was 31,650 t (31,150 long tons), but displaced 28,900 long tons (29,364 t) standard and 35,400 long tons (35,968 t) at full displacement. The ships were to be of welded steel construction, with twenty watertight compartments and a double bottom that extended for 78% of the length of the hull. The ships were to have had a crew of 65 officers and 1,900 men.

They were intended to carry a number of boats aboard, including two picket boats, two barges, two launches, two pinnaces, two yawls, and two dinghies. The ships were also to be equipped with a double catapult mounted between the two funnels, and four Arado Ar 196 seaplanes for maritime reconnaissance. The aircraft were stored in a main hangar just aft of the forward funnel, along with two smaller hangars, one on each side of the rear funnel.

=== Propulsion ===
The O-class ships were to be driven by three screws, two diesel powered and one steam. Eight MAN 24-cylinder V-configuration two-stroke diesel engines powered two Vulcan gearboxes, both of which drove the outer pair of 4.85 m (15.9 ft) diameter three-bladed screws. Aft of the diesel engines was a single boiler room with four Wagner high-pressure boilers that provided up to 55 atmospheres of pressure. These supplied steam for one set of Brown, Boveri & Cie turbines, which provided power for the center 4.9 m (16 ft) three-bladed screw. The O-class ships were designed to store 1,000 tons of fuel oil for the high pressure boilers, and up to 4,610 tons of diesel oil for the diesel engines. This enabled a maximum range of 14,000 nautical miles at a cruising speed of 19 knots. They were designed to steam at a maximum of 33.5 knots, but were capable of up to 35 knots. The ships had two rudders each. Eight 920 kW diesel generators supplied electrical power for the ships, for a total of 7360 kW, at 220 V.

=== Armament ===
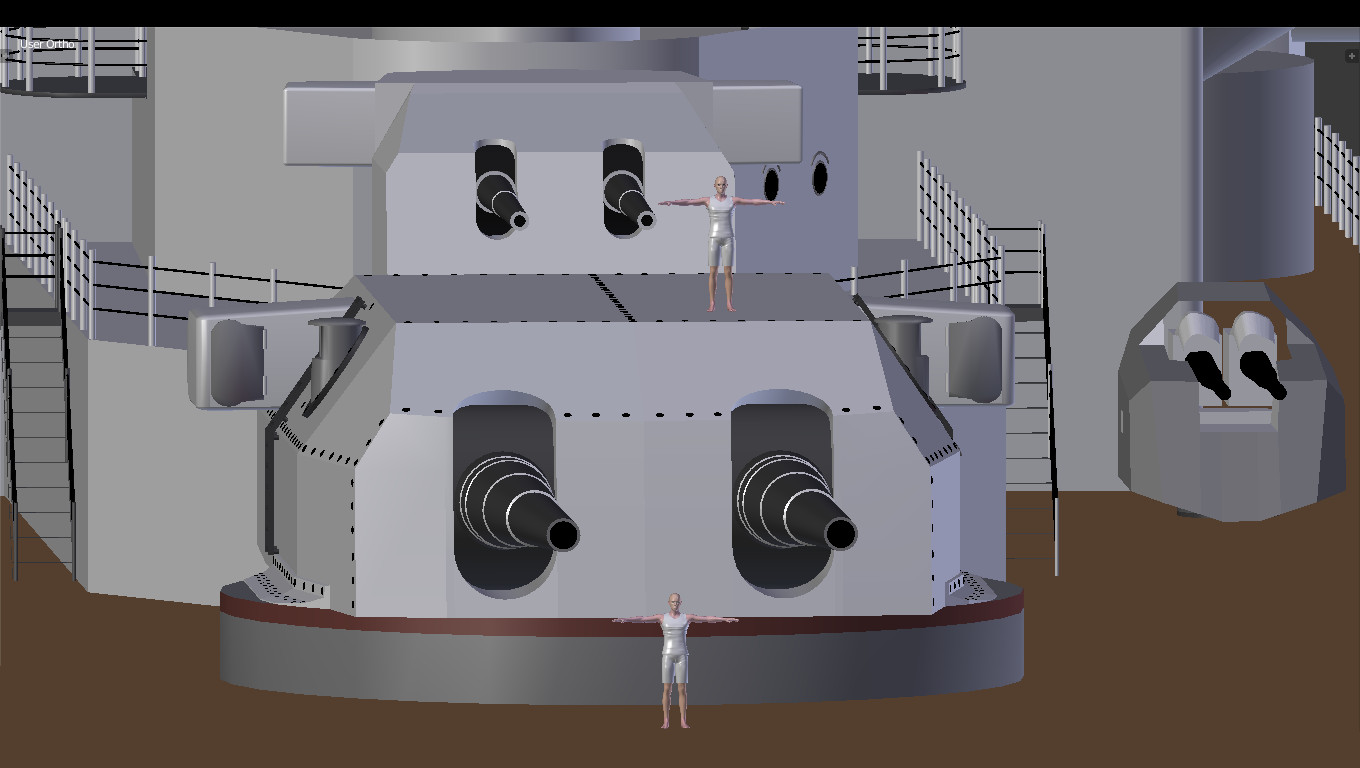
The rear main battery turret, with the superfiring secondary turret. Also visible is a twin 10.5 cm FlaK 38 anti-aircraft gun

The ships' main armament batteries were to have consisted of six 38.1 cm (15 in) L/47 SK C/34 quick-firing guns mounted in three twin turrets, the same Drh LC/38 gun turrets as were used on the Bismarck-class battleships. Two of the turrets were mounted in a superfiring pair forward, with the third turret placed aft of the main superstructure. The guns could depress to −8 degrees and elevate to 35 degrees. At maximum elevation, the guns could hit targets 36,200 m (39,600 yd) away. The guns had a designed supply of 630 shells, for a total of 105 rounds per gun. There were three types of shells: capped armor-penetrating, and two different high-explosive shells; all three shells weighed 800 kg (1,800 lb). The guns used a 99.5 kg (219 lb) fore charge and a 112.5 kg (248 lb) main charge in a brass case. This provided a muzzle velocity of 820 meters per second (2,690 feet per second).

The secondary battery consisted of six 15 cm (5.9 in) L/48 quick-firing guns, also mounted in three twin turrets; two were placed on either side of the forward superstructure, the third was placed aft of the main superstructure, superfiring over the rear main battery turret. These guns were supplied with 900 rounds, for 150 shells per gun, and had a maximum range of 23,500 m (25,700 yd). The ships were also armed with six 53.3 cm (21 in) above-water torpedo tubes, with a total of 18 torpedoes.

The ships had an anti-aircraft battery consisting of eight 10.5 cm (4.1 in) L/65 SK C/33 heavy anti-aircraft guns, eight 3.7 cm (1.5 in) L/83 SK C/30 anti-aircraft guns, and twenty 2 cm (0.79 in). The 10.5 cm guns were emplaced in twin mounts, two on either side of the superstructure, as were the 3.7 cm guns. The 2 cm SK C/30 guns were placed in single mounts, dispersed on the superstructure amidships.

=== Armor ===
The O-class ships were to be protected by Krupp Wotan steel armor. The main armored belt was 190 mm (7.5 in) thick in the most critical areas of the ship, including the machinery spaces and ammunition magazines, and 100 mm (3.9 in) in other less important areas; the armor tapered to zero at the stern and bow of the ship. A torpedo bulkhead ran the length of the hull; the bulkhead was 45 mm (1.8 in) thick for the majority of its length. A second bulkhead was placed in the central portion of the ship. The bulkhead was 80 mm (3.1 in) thick but increased to 110 mm (4.3 in) in the more important portions of the ship. Critical areas were further protected by 80 mm-thick shields set back from the torpedo bulkhead. All of the lateral armor protection was Wotan Hart steel, with the exception of the torpedo bulkhead, which was Wotan Weich. (Note: Wotan Hart is hardened Wotan armor, while Weich is more flexible soft steel. The hardened Wotan had a breaking strength of 85–96 kg/mm^{2} and 20% expansion, while the soft steel Wotan had a breaking strength of 65–75 kg/mm^{2} and 25% expansion.)

The ships had several layers of horizontal deck armor. The upper deck was 50 mm (2 in) thick, and the armored deck ranged in thickness from 20 to 80 mm (0.79 to 3.15 in); important areas were also protected by 60 mm (2.4 in) thick overhead shields. The armored belt connected to 110 mm-thick sloping armor. The forward conning tower had a roof 60 mm thick and 200 mm (7.9 in) armored sides; the aft conning tower was significantly less well protected. The roof was decreased to 30 mm (1.2 in) and the sides were 50 mm thick. The rangefinders were protected against shell splinters by 20 mm (0.79 in) roofs and 30 mm sides. All of this armor was Wotan Hart.

The main battery turrets had 50 mm thick roofs and sides that were 210 mm (8.3 in) thick. The inner shields were 180 mm (7.1 in) thick. The 15 cm gun turrets had 14 mm (0.55 in) thick protection against shell fragments. All of the anti-aircraft weaponry were also protected with 14 mm-thick gun shields. The aircraft hangars also had 14 mm-thick splinter protection. The relatively thin armor protection given to the ships of the O class led to their derisive nickname "Ohne Panzer Quatsch" (Without armor nonsense), a play on their provisional names.

== Ships of the class ==
Construction data
Ship	Builder	Ordered
Schlachtkreuzer O	Deutsche Werke	Projected
Schlachtkreuzer P	Kriegsmarinewerft Wilhelmshaven	Projected
Schlachtkreuzer Q	Germaniawerft	8 August 1939
