= D-class cruiser (Germany) =

Pair of German cruisers, classified as Panzerschiffe

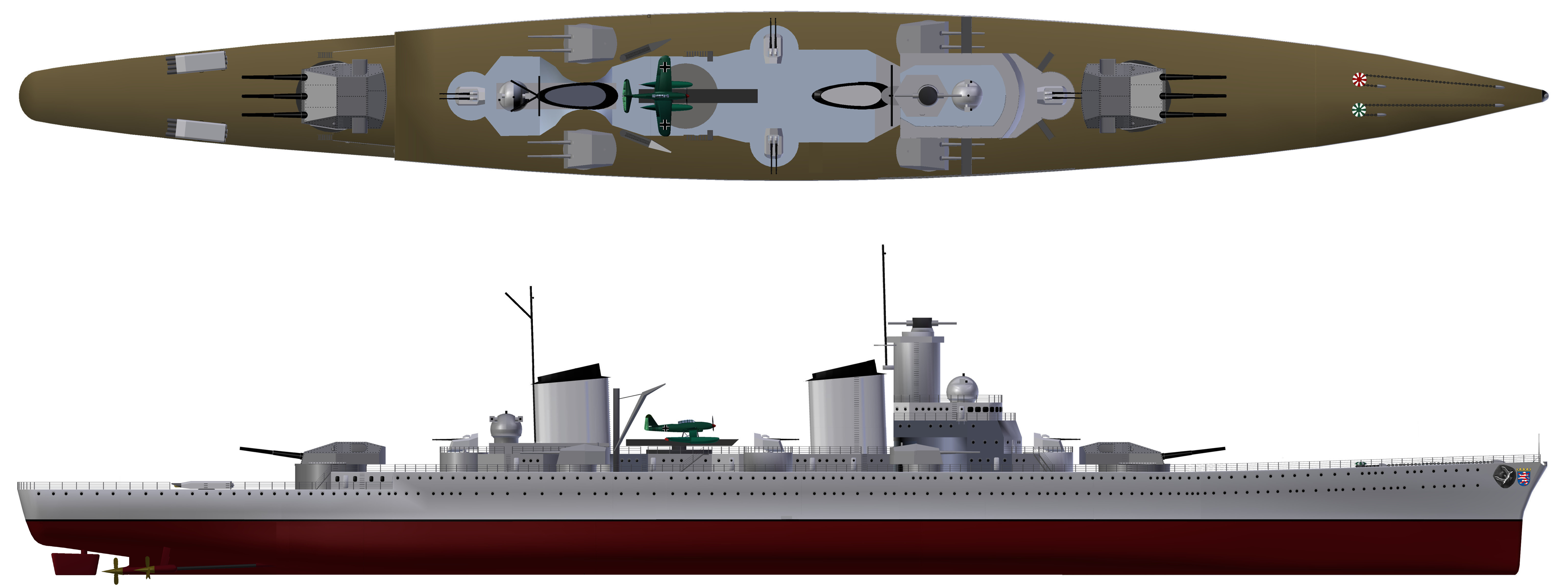
- CG rendering of the D-class cruiser design

Class overview
- Builders: Reichsmarinewerft Wilhelmshaven; Deutsche Werke, Kiel
- Operators: Reichsmarine
- Preceded by: Deutschland class
- Succeeded by: Admiral Hipper class
- Built: 14 February – 5 July 1934
- Planned: 2
- Completed: 0
- Cancelled: 2

General characteristics
- Type: Heavy cruiser
- Displacement: 20,000 long tons (20,000 t)
- Length: 230 m (754 ft 7 in) overall; 225 meters (738 ft 2 in) waterline
- Beam: 25.5 m (83 ft 8 in)
- Draft: 8.5 m (27 ft 11 in)
- Installed power: 125,000 PS (123,000 shp)
- Propulsion: Steam turbines
- Speed: 29 knots (54 km/h; 33 mph)
- Armament: 6 × 28 cm (11 in)/52 SK C/28 guns (2 × 3); 8 × 15 cm (5.9 in)/55 SK C/28 guns (4 × 2); 8 × 10.5 cm (4.1 in)/65 SK C/33 AA guns (4 × 2)
- Armor: Belt: 220 mm (8.7 in); Upper deck: 35 mm (1.4 in); Deck: 70 to 80 mm (2.8 to 3.1 in); Turrets:200 to 360 mm (7.9 to 14.2 in); Conning tower: 300 mm (12 in); Citadel: 50 mm (2 in)

The D-class cruisers were a pair of German heavy cruisers, classified as panzerschiffe ("armored ships") by the Reichsmarine (Navy of the Realm). The ships were improved versions of the preceding Deutschland-class cruisers, authorized by Adolf Hitler in 1933. They were intended to counter a new French naval construction program. Displacement increased to 20,000 long tons (20,000 t), but Hitler allowed only increases to armor, prohibiting additions to the ships' main battery armament. Both ships were laid down in February 1934, but not much work done before work was cancelled pending a significant revision of the design. It was determined that the ships should be enlarged to counter the new French Dunkerque-class battleship. The construction contracts for both ships were superseded by the Scharnhorst-class battleships.

== Design ==
The ships were designed as follow-ons to the Deutschland-class cruisers. In 1933, the rise of the Nazi Party brought Adolf Hitler to power in Germany. At the time, he opposed a large-scale naval rearmament program, but decided to allow limited construction to counter French naval expansion. He therefore authorized the Reichsmarine (Navy of the Realm) to build two additional panzerschiffe (armored ships) to supplement the three Deutschlands. He stipulated that displacement be limited to 19,000 long tons (19,305 t) and the primary battery would remain two triple gun turrets mounting 28 cm (11 in) guns. Admiral Erich Raeder, the commander in chief of the Reichsmarine, advocated increasing the armor protection for the new panzerschiffe and inquired about the possibility of including a third triple turret. It was determined, however, that a third turret could not be added to the ship and still remain within the 19,000 ton limit prescribed by Hitler.

The ships were designed under the contract names D and E, and designed under the provisional names Ersatz Elsass and Ersatz Hessen as replacements for the old pre-dreadnought battleships SMS Elsass and SMS Hessen. The contracts were awarded on 25 January 1934 with D being awarded to Reichsmarinewerft in Wilhelmshaven and E awarded to Deutsche Werke in Kiel . Both ships' keels were laid on 14 February. That month, the Reichsmarine decided to alter the designs to counter the new Dunkerque-class battleships building in France. Displacement was increased to 26,000 long tons (26,000 t) and a third 28 cm triple-turret was added. Construction the two ships was therefore halted on 5 July. The construction contracts were canceled and reallocated for the two battleships of the Scharnhorst class.

=== Characteristics ===
The ships were 230 meters (754 ft 7 in) long overall, and 225 m (738 ft 2 in) at the waterline. The ships would have had a beam of 25.5 m (83 ft 8 in) and a draft of 8.5 m (27 ft 11 in). The finalized design displaced 20,000 long tons (20,321 t) at the designed displacement. "D" was to have been fitted with accommodations to serve as a fleet flagship. The ships would have been turbine-powered; the engines were designed to provide 125,000 metric horsepower (123,000 shp) and a top speed of 29 knots (54 km/h; 33 mph). The number of and type of boilers for the turbines is unknown, but they would have been vented through two large funnels.

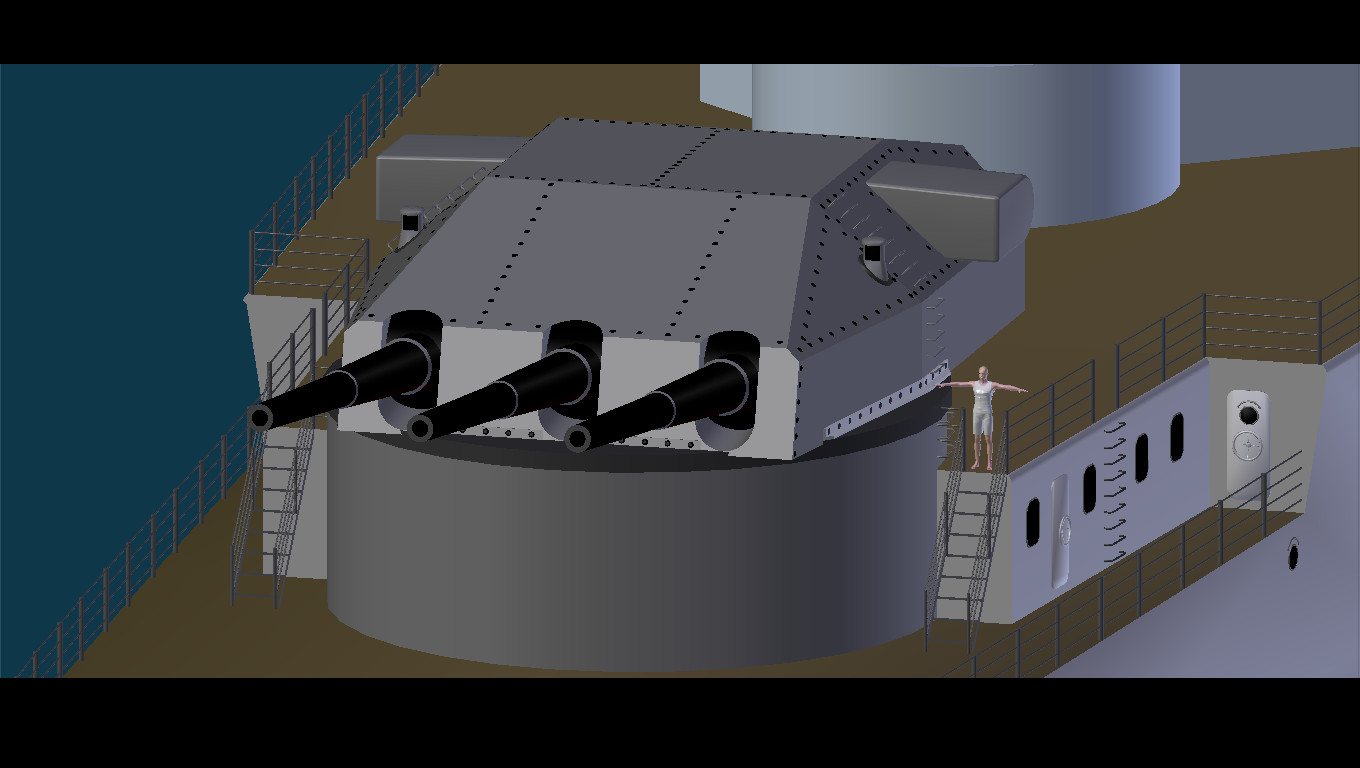
The rear 28 cm gun turret

The ships would have been similarly equipped to the preceding Deutschland-class ships. The ships would have mounted a main battery of six of the same 28 cm (11 in)/52 C/28 quick-firing guns in the same triple turret mounts, though eight guns were considered, had there been a quadruple turret available. The guns had an actual bore diameter of 28.3 cm (11.1 in), and fired both armor-piercing and high-explosive shells; both shells weighed 300 kg (661.4 lb). The guns used two sets of propellant charges: a 36 kg (79.4 lb) fore charge in a silk bag and a 71 kg (156.6 lb) main charge in a brass case. The shells were fired at 910 meters per second (2,986 fps), and at maximum elevation of 40 degrees, a range of 36,475 m (39,890 yards). The guns had a rate of fire of 2.5 rounds per minute. The guns were supplied by a total of 900 shells, for a total of 150 rounds per gun.

The design's secondary battery comprised eight 15 cm (5.9 in)/55 SK C/28 quick-firing guns in four twin turrets, two abreast the conning tower and the other pair abreast the rear funnel. The guns fired a 45.3 kg (100 lb) shells at a muzzle velocity of 875 m/s (2,870 ft/s). With a maximum elevation of 40°, the guns could fire out to 23,000 m (75,000 ft). These guns had already been ordered by the time construction of the ships was canceled; their availability influenced the design of the Scharnhorst class, which mounted eight of their twelve 15 cm guns in dual turrets.

The heavy anti-aircraft battery consisted of eight 10.5 cm (4.1 in) SK C/33 guns in twin mountings. The mounts were the Dopp LC/31 type, originally designed for earlier 8.8 cm (3.5 in) SK C/31 guns. The LC/31 mounting was triaxially stabilized and capable of elevating to 80°. This enabled the guns to engage targets up to a ceiling of 12,500 m (41,000 ft). Against surface targets, the guns had a maximum range of 17,700 m (58,100 ft). The guns fired fixed ammunition weighing 15.1 kg (33 lb); the guns could fire HE and HE incendiary rounds, as well as illumination shells. A number of various other anti-aircraft guns were also to be fitted, but the details were not determined before the class was canceled. The ships were also armed with an unknown number of 53.3 cm (21 in) torpedo tubes.

The D-class ships used steel manufactured by Krupp for their armor. The ships' upper deck armor was 35 mm (1.4 in) thick. The main armored deck was 70 mm (2.8 in) forward, 80 mm (3.1 in) amidships, and decreased to 70 mm towards the stern. The conning tower was quite heavily armored, with side armor 300 mm (11.8 in) thick. The main armored belt was 220 mm (8.7 in) thick, and the upper citadel armor was 50 mm (2 in) thick.
