= 28 cm SK C/28 naval gun =

28 cm SK C/28
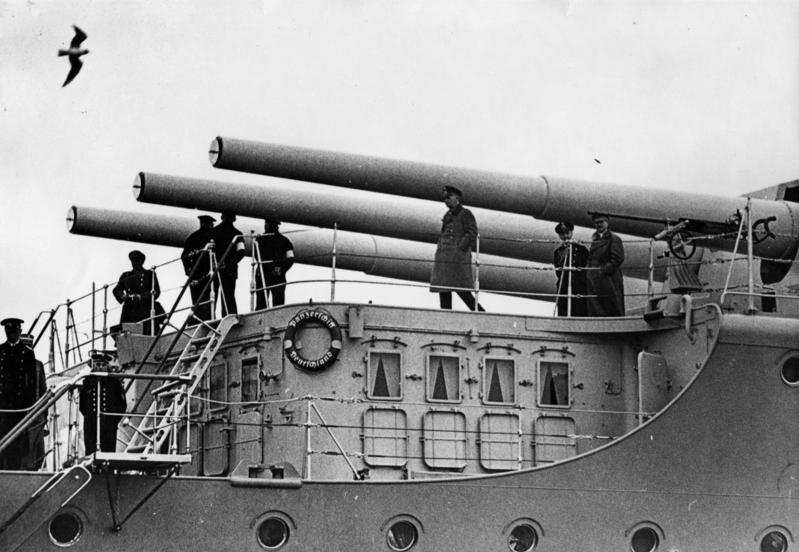
- Adolf Hitler and other senior German staff below the aft guns of Deutschland in April 1934
- Type: Naval gun
- Place of origin: Weimar Republic

Service history
- In service: 1930-1945
- Used by: Reichsmarine; Kriegsmarine
- Wars: World War II

Production history
- Designed: 1928

Specifications
- Mass: 48.2 tonnes (47.4 long tons)
- Length: 14.815 m (48 ft 7.3 in)
- Barrel length: 13.9 m (46 ft) (bore length)
- Caliber: 283 mm (11.1 in)
- Elevation: -10° to +40°
- Rate of fire: 2.5 RPM
- Muzzle velocity: 910 m/s (3,000 ft/s)
- Maximum firing range: 36,475 m (22.665 mi) at 40°

The German 28 cm C/28 (Note: SK – Schnelladekanone (quick loading cannon); C – Construktionsjahr (year of design)) was a 283 mm 52-caliber built-up gun designed in 1928 and used on the Deutschland class cruisers.

== History ==
28 cm SK C/28 naval gun were used on the famous Panzerschiffes - Lützow (ex-Deutschland), Admiral Scheer and Admiral Graf Spee. For needed elevation turrets were fitted with RPC.

Shells used in the guns were of inferior ballistic characteristics when compared to successor 28 cm SK C/34.

== Characteristics ==
Characteristics of SK C/28 and the later SK C/34 283 mm shells are in the table below:

Gun type	Shell type	Length(calibers)	Total weight
SK C/28	Armor-piercing	3.7	300 kg (660 lb)
	Semi-armor-piercing	4.2	300 kg (660 lb)
	Igniting	4.2	300 kg (660 lb)
SK C/34	Armor-piercing	4.4	336 kg (741 lb)
	Semi-armorpiercing	4.4	316 kg (697 lb)
	Igniting	4.5	315 kg (694 lb)

Performance of the SK C/28 at different ranges, firing a 300 kg armour-piercing projectile :

Distance	5,000 m (5,500 yd)	10,000 m (11,000 yd)	15,000 m (16,000 yd)	20,000 m (22,000 yd)	25,000 m (27,000 yd)	30,000 m (33,000 yd)	35,000 m (38,000 yd)	36,475 m (39,890 yd)
Shooting angle[deg]	1.9	4.5	8.0	12.5	18.6	26.3	36.4	40.0
Shell hitting angle[deg]	2.4	6.0	11.8	21.4	34.2	46.4	56.0	-
Shell velocity at target	752 m/s (2,470 ft/s)	611 m/s (2,000 ft/s)	493 m/s (1,620 ft/s)	407 m/s (1,340 ft/s)	360 m/s (1,200 ft/s)	353 m/s (1,160 ft/s)	?	-

== See also ==
- List of naval guns
- 28 cm SK C/34 naval gun
