= Deutschland-class cruiser =

1929 cruiser class of the German Navy

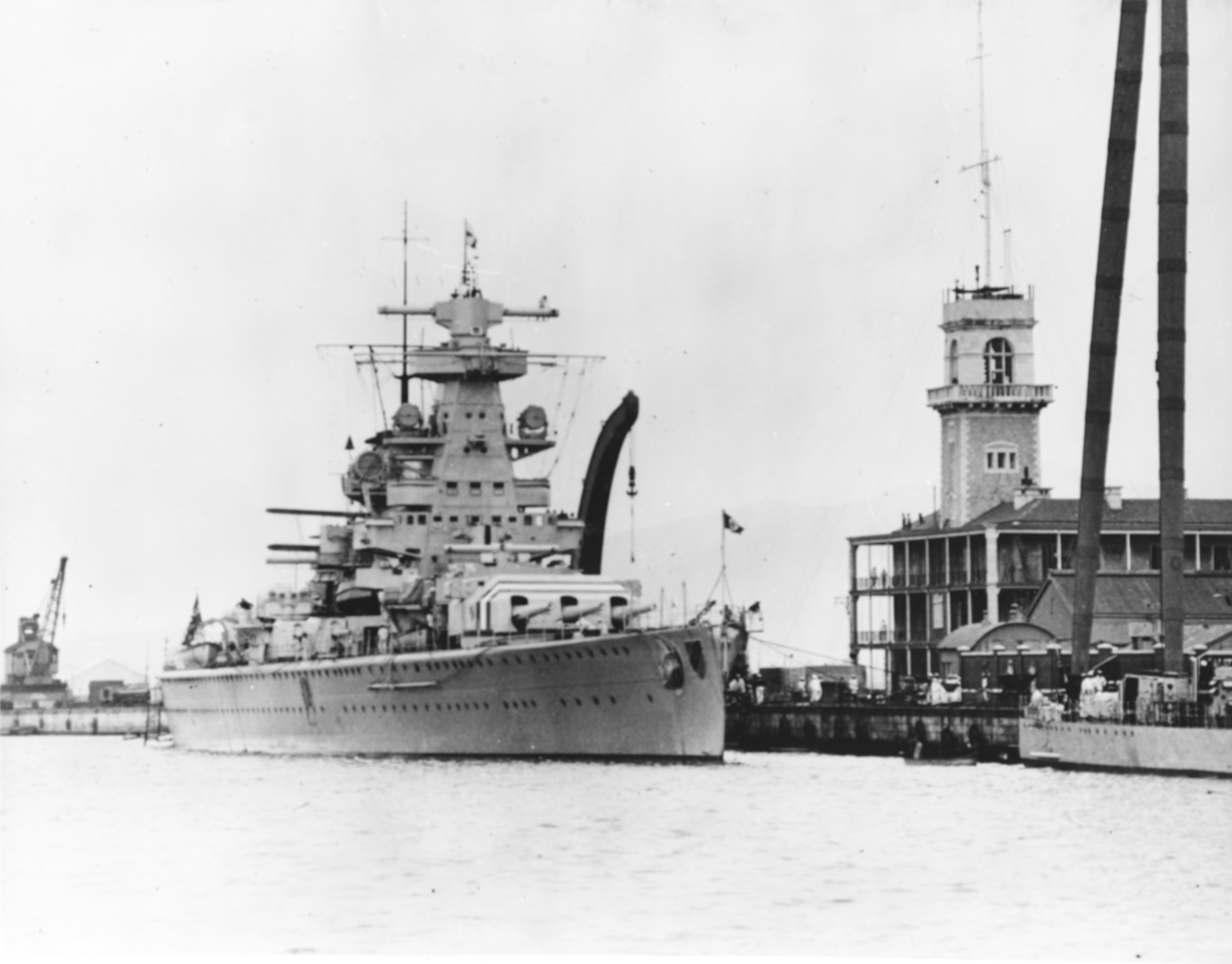
- Admiral Scheer at Gibraltar in 1936

Class overview
- Operators: Reichsmarine; Kriegsmarine
- Preceded by: None
- Succeeded by: Admiral Hipper class (actual); D-class cruiser (planned)
- Built: 1929–1936
- In service: 1933–1945
- Completed: 3
- Lost: 3

General characteristics
- Type: Heavy cruiser
- Displacement: Standard: 10,600 long tons (10,800 t); Full load: 14,290 long tons (14,520 t)
- Length: 186 m (610 ft 3 in)
- Beam: 20.69 m (67 ft 11 in)
- Draft: 7.25 m (23 ft 9 in)
- Installed power: 54,000 PS (53,260 shp; 39,720 kW)
- Propulsion: 8 × MAN diesel engines; 2 × propellers
- Speed: 26 knots (48 km/h; 30 mph)
- Range: 10,000 nmi (19,000 km; 12,000 mi) at 20 knots (37 km/h; 23 mph)
- Complement: 33 officers; 586 enlisted
- Armament: 6 × 28 cm (11 in) in triple turrets; 8 × 15 cm (5.9 in) in single turrets; 3 × 8.8 cm (3.5 in) in single mounts; 8 × 53.3 cm (21 in) torpedo tubes
- Armor: Main turrets: 140 mm (5.5 in); Belt: 80 mm (3.1 in); Deck: 45 mm (1.8 in)
- Aircraft carried: 1 × Heinkel He 60 seaplane
- Aviation facilities: One catapult
- Notes: (Note: Figures are for Deutschland as built; characteristics varied between the ships and over the course of their careers.)

The Deutschland class was a series of three Panzerschiffe (armored ships), (Note: singular Panzerschiff) a form of heavily armed cruiser, built by the Reichsmarine (Germany navy) officially in accordance with restrictions imposed by the Treaty of Versailles. The ships of the class, Deutschland, Admiral Scheer, and Admiral Graf Spee, were all stated to displace 10,000 long tons (10,160 t) in accordance with the Treaty, though they actually displaced 10,600 to 12,340 long tons (10,770 to 12,540 t) at standard displacement. The design for the ships incorporated several radical innovations, including the first major use of welding in a warship and all-diesel propulsion. Due to their heavy armament of six 28 cm (11 in) guns and lighter weight, the British referred to the vessels as "pocket battleships". The Deutschland-class ships were initially classified as Panzerschiffe, but the Kriegsmarine (the renamed German navy) reclassified them as heavy cruisers in February 1940.

The three ships were built between 1929 and 1936 by the Deutsche Werke in Kiel and the Reichsmarinewerft in Wilhelmshaven, seeing much service with the German Navy. All three vessels served on non-intervention patrols during the Spanish Civil War. While on patrol, Deutschland was attacked by Republican bombers, and in response, Admiral Scheer bombarded the port of Almería. In 1937, Admiral Graf Spee represented Germany at the Coronation Review for Britain's King George VI. For the rest of their peacetime careers, the ships conducted a series of fleet maneuvers in the Atlantic and visited numerous foreign ports in goodwill tours.

Before the outbreak of World War II, Deutschland and Admiral Graf Spee were deployed to the Atlantic to put them in position to attack Allied merchant traffic once war was declared. Admiral Scheer remained in port for periodic maintenance. Deutschland was not particularly successful on her raiding sortie, during which she sank or captured three ships. She then returned to Germany, where she was renamed Lützow. Admiral Graf Spee sank nine vessels in the South Atlantic before she was confronted by three British cruisers at the Battle of the River Plate. Although she damaged the British ships, she was herself damaged and her engines were in poor condition. Coupled with deceptive false British reports of reinforcements, the state of the ship convinced Hans Langsdorff, her commander, to scuttle the ship outside Montevideo, Uruguay.

Lützow and Admiral Scheer were deployed to Norway in 1942 to join the attacks on Allied convoys to the Soviet Union. Admiral Scheer conducted Operation Wunderland in August 1942, a sortie into the Kara Sea to attack Soviet merchant shipping, though it ended without significant success. Lützow took part in the Battle of the Barents Sea in December 1942, a failed attempt to destroy a convoy. Both ships were damaged in the course of their deployment to Norway and eventually returned to Germany for repairs. They ended their careers bombarding advancing Soviet forces on the Eastern Front; both ships were destroyed by British bombers in the final weeks of the war. Lützow was raised and sunk as a target by the Soviet Navy, and Admiral Scheer was partially broken up in situ, with the remainder of the hulk buried beneath rubble.

== Development ==
Following Germany's defeat in World War I, the size of the German Navy, renamed the Reichsmarine, was limited by the Treaty of Versailles. The Navy was permitted a force of six pre-dreadnought battleships and six light cruisers; the ships could not be replaced until they were twenty years old. To replace the battleships, new vessels were to displace at most 10,000 long tons (10,160 t); Germany's potential rivals were at this time limited to building vessels of 35,000 long tons (36,000 t) by the Washington Naval Treaty and subsequent agreements. The gun caliber of any new ship was not regulated by the Treaty itself, though the Naval Inter-Allied Commission of Control (NIACC) created by the Treaty did have authority to regulate the armament of all new warships. (Note: For example, the Reichsmarine wanted to equip the Königsberg-class cruisers with 19 cm (7.5 in) guns, instead of the 15 cm (5.9 in) guns mounted on Emden; the NIACC prohibited the larger caliber. See O'Brien, pp. 112–113.) The Allies assumed that with these limitations, only coastal defense ships similar to those operated by the Scandinavian navies could be built.

The Reichsmarine's oldest battleship, Preussen, was laid down in 1902 and could therefore be replaced legally in 1922. Design studies were considered starting in 1920, with two basic options: the Navy could build a heavily armored, slow, and small warship similar to a monitor, or a large, fast, and lightly armored vessel similar to a cruiser. Actual design work on the new type of armored ship began in 1923, but the economic collapse forced a temporary halt to the work. Admiral Hans Zenker, the commander in chief of the Reichsmarine, pushed hard for the navy to resume design work, and in 1925 three new proposals were drafted. In addition to two sketches prepared in 1923, this totaled five different designs. Of the first two designs, "I/10" was a 32-knot (59 km/h; 37 mph) cruiser armed with eight 20.5 cm (8.1 in) guns while "II/10" was a 22-knot (41 km/h; 25 mph), heavily armored ship armed with four 38 cm (15 in) guns. The three designs prepared in 1925—"II/30", "IV/30", and "V/30"—were armed with six 30 cm (12 in) guns with varying levels of armor protection. The Reichsmarine eventually opted for 28 cm (11 in) guns to avoid provoking the Allies and to ease pressures on the design staff.

The Reichsmarine held a conference to evaluate the designs in May 1925, though the results were inconclusive. Of particular importance was the continued French occupation of the Ruhr industrial area, which prevented Germany from quickly building large-caliber artillery. Nevertheless, the design staff prepared another set of designs, "I/35", a heavily armored ship with a single triple turret forward, and "VIII/30", a more lightly-armored ship with a pair of twin turrets. The Reichsmarine initially intended to lay down the first armored ship in 1926, but the design had not yet been finalized. The 1926 maneuvers informed the design staff that greater speed was desirable, and that year, a further two designs were submitted to Zenker. The initial design for Deutschland, ordered as "Panzerschiff A", was prepared in 1926 and finalized by 1928. Zenker announced on 11 June 1927 that the Navy had settled on one of several proposals for the new warships. The Reichsmarine had decided that the new ships would be armed with two triple turrets mounting 28 cm guns.

Political opposition to the new ships was significant. The Reichsmarine therefore decided to delay ordering the ship until after the Reichstag elections in 1928. The question over whether to build the new ships was a major issue in elections, particularly with the Social Democrats, who strongly opposed the new ships and campaigned with the slogan "Food not Panzerkreuzer." In May 1928, the elections were concluded and enough of a majority in favor of the new ships was elected; this included twelve seats won by Adolf Hitler's Nazi Party. An October 1928 attempt by the Communist Party of Germany to initiate a referendum against the construction failed. The first of the new ships was authorized in November 1928.

When the particulars of the design became known by the Allies, they attempted to prevent Germany from building them. The Reichsmarine offered to halt construction on the first ship in exchange for admittance to the Washington Treaty with a ratio of 125,000 long tons (127,000 t) to Britain's allotment of 525,000 long tons (533,000 t) of capital ship tonnage. In doing so, this would effectively abrogate the clauses in the Treaty of Versailles that limited Germany's naval power. Britain and the United States favored making concessions to Germany, but France refused to allow any revisions to the Treaty of Versailles. Since the ships did not violate the terms of the Treaty, the Allies could not prevent Germany from building them after a negotiated settlement proved unattainable.

== Design ==
=== General characteristics ===
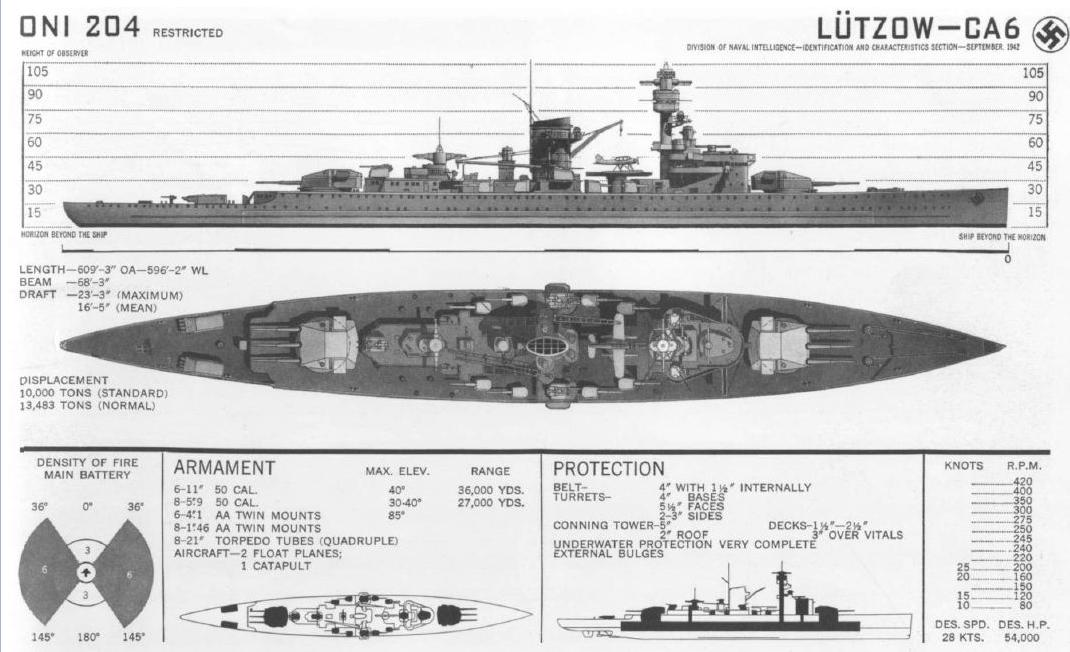
Recognition drawing of Lützow as she appeared in 1942. It indicates that the armoured belt is 4 inches thick, instead of its actual 3.1 inches.

The three Deutschland-class ships varied slightly in dimensions. All three ships were 181.70 meters (596.1 ft) long at the waterline, and as built, 186 m (610 ft 3 in) long overall. Deutschland and Admiral Scheer had clipper bows installed in 1940–1941; their overall length was increased to 187.90 m (616 ft 6 in). Deutschland had a beam of 20.69 m (67 ft 11 in), Admiral Scheer's beam was 21.34 m (70 ft 0 in), while Admiral Graf Spee's was 21.65 m (71 ft 0 in). Deutschland and Admiral Scheer had a standard draft of 5.78 m (19 ft 0 in) and a full-load draft of 7.25 m (23 ft 9 in). Admiral Graf Spee's draft was 5.80 m (19 ft 0 in) and 7.34 m (24 ft 1 in), respectively. The displacement of the three ships increased over the class. Standard displacement grew from 10,600 long tons (10,800 t) for Deutschland to 11,550 long tons (11,740 t) for Admiral Scheer and 12,340 long tons (12,540 t) for Admiral Graf Spee. The ships' full load displacements were significantly higher, at 14,290 long tons (14,520 t) for Deutschland, 13,660 long tons (13,880 t) for Admiral Scheer, and 16,020 long tons (16,280 t) for Admiral Graf Spee. The ships were officially stated to be within the 10,000 long tons (10,000 t) limit of the Treaty of Versailles, however.

The ships' hulls were constructed with transverse steel frames; over 90 percent of the hulls used welding instead of the then standard riveting, which saved 15 percent of their total hull weight. These savings allowed the armament and armor to be increased. The hulls contained twelve watertight compartments and were fitted with a double bottom that extended for 92 percent of the length of the keel. As designed, the ship's complement comprised 33 officers and 586 enlisted men. After 1935, the crew was dramatically increased, to 30 officers and 921–1,040 sailors. While serving as a squadron flagship, an additional 17 officers and 85 enlisted men augmented the crew. The second flagship had an additional 13 officers and 59 sailors. The ships carried a number of smaller boats, including two picket boats, two barges, one launch, one pinnace, and two dinghies.

The Kriegsmarine considered the ships to be good sea boats, with a slight roll. As built, they were wet in a head sea, though this was significantly improved by the installation of a clipper bow in 1940–1941. The ships were highly maneuverable, particularly when the maneuvering setting for the diesel engines was used, in which half of the engines for each shaft were run in reverse. The ships heeled over up to 13 degrees with the rudder hard over. The low stern was wet in a stern sea, and equipment stored there was frequently lost overboard.

=== Machinery ===
The Deutschland-class ships were equipped with two sets of four 9-cylinder, double-acting, two-stroke diesel engines built by MAN. The adoption of an all-diesel propulsion system was a radical innovation at the time and contributed to significant savings in weight. Each set was controlled by transmissions built by AG Vulcan. The engines were paired on two propeller shafts, which were attached to three-bladed screws that were 4.40 m (14 ft 5 in) in diameter. Deutschland was initially fitted with 3.70 m (12 ft 2 in) diameter screws, before they were replaced with the larger screws. The engines were rated at 54,000 metric horsepower (53,261.3 shp; 39,716.9 kW) and a top speed of 26 knots (48 km/h; 30 mph). They did not meet the expected shaft-horsepower on trials, though they did exceed their design speeds. Deutschland's engines reached 48,390 PS (47,730 shp; 35,590 kW) and 28 knots (52 km/h; 32 mph), and Admiral Scheer's engines reached 52,050 PS (51,340 shp; 38,280 kW) and 28.3 knots (52.4 km/h; 32.6 mph). Horsepower figures for Admiral Graf Spee are not recorded, though her top speed on trials was 29.5 knots (54.6 km/h; 33.9 mph).

Deutschland could carry up to 2,750 t (2,710 long tons) of fuel oil, which provided a maximum range of 17,400 nautical miles (32,200 km; 20,000 mi) at a speed of 13 knots (24 km/h; 15 mph). An increase in speed by one knot reduced the range slightly to 16,600 nmi (30,700 km; 19,100 mi). At a higher speed of 20 knots (37 km/h; 23 mph), the range fell to 10,000 nmi (19,000 km; 12,000 mi). Admiral Scheer carried 2,410 t (2,370 long tons) and had a correspondingly shorter range of 9,100 nmi (16,900 km; 10,500 mi) at 20 kn. Admiral Graf Spee stored 2,500 t (2,500 long tons) of fuel, which enabled a range of 8,900 nmi (16,500 km; 10,200 mi). Electricity was supplied by four electric generators powered by two diesel engines. Their total output was 2,160 kW for Deutschland, 2,800 kW for Admiral Scheer, and 3,360 kW for Admiral Graf Spee, all at 220 volts. Steering was controlled by a single rudder.

=== Armament ===
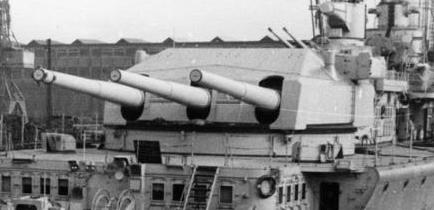
Lützow's rear gun turret

The three Deutschland-class ships were armed with a main battery of six 28 cm SK C/28 guns mounted in two triple turrets, one on either end of the superstructure. The turrets were the Drh LC/28 type and allowed elevation to 40 degrees, and depression to −8 degrees. This provided the guns with a maximum range of 36,475 m (39,890 yd). They fired a 300 kg (660 lb) projectile at a muzzle velocity of 910 meters per second (3,000 ft/s). The guns were initially supplied with a total 630 rounds of ammunition, and this was later increased to 720 shells.

The secondary battery comprised eight 15 cm SK C/28 guns, each in single MPLC/28 mountings arranged amidships. These mountings allowed elevation to 35 degrees and depression to −10 degrees, for a range of 25,700 m (28,100 yd). They were supplied with a total of 800 rounds of ammunition, though later in their careers this was increased to 1,200 rounds. These shells weighed 45.3 kg (100 lb) and had a muzzle velocity of 875 m/s (2,870 ft/s).

It had been intended to equip the Deutschland-class ships with a heavy anti-aircraft battery of two dual 8.8 cm SK C/25 guns, but this gun proved to be unsatisfactory and its replacement was not ready in time. Hence Deutschland received three obsolete 8.8 cm SK L/45 anti-aircraft guns in single mounts. These were replaced in 1935 with six 8.8 cm SK C/31 guns in twin mounts. Admiral Scheer, which was built later, received the three twin 8.8 cm guns when under construction. Finally Admiral Graf Spee was equipped with three twin 10.5 cm L/65 guns. Admiral Scheer and Deutschland were rearmed in 1938 and 1940, respectively, with six 10.5 cm L/65 guns. For directing the anti-aircraft battery, Deutschland received two SL-2 director posts which were placed above the bridge and abaft the stack. On Admiral Scheer and Admiral Graf Spee the place abaft the stack was taken by the catapult so these ship received three SL-4, one above the bridge and on port and starboard of the stack.

The middle and light anti-aircraft defense consisted of four twin 3.7 cm SK C/30 guns and ten single 2 cm Flak guns, but due to shortages, Deutschland received her full middle and light armament only during her 1940 refit. During the war, the middle and light armament was continuously reinforced. In August 1944 the two forward pair of 3.7 cm guns on Deutschland were changed for single Bofors 40 mm L/60 guns, and an additional four singe 40 mm guns were installed as well. Only two single 2 cm guns remained, the others were changed for six twins and three quadruples, totaling twenty-eight 2 cm guns. Admiral Scheer had been rearmed by 1945 with six 4 cm (1.6 in) guns, eight 3.7 cm guns, and thirty-three 2 cm guns.

The ships were also equipped with eight torpedo tubes placed in two quadruple launchers mounted on their stern. Deutschland was completed with 50 cm (20 in) torpedo tubes, but immediately after completion these were changed to 53.3 cm (21 in). The two other ships received the larger weapons during construction. The torpedo tubes were covered with a protective shield against the gun blast of the aft main guns.

=== Aircraft ===
Deutschland was built without a catapult. During a refit between November 1935 and 11 January 1936, a catapult was installed between the foretop and funnel. A Heinkel He 60 was carried on the catapult and abaft the funnel fittings were installed to provide capacity to carry a second aircraft. Admiral Scheer and Admiral Graf Spee, which had a much larger tower mast instead of a foretop, had their catapult installed abaft the funnel. In 1939, the He 60 was replaced with one Arado Ar 196.

=== Armor ===
The ships' main armored belt was 80 mm (3.1 in) thick amidships and reduced to 60 mm (2.4 in) on either end of the central citadel. The bow and stern were unarmored at the waterline. This belt was inclined to increase its protective qualities and supplemented by a 20 mm (0.79 in) longitudinal splinter bulkhead. The upper edge of the belt on Deutschland and Admiral Scheer was at the level of the armored deck. On Admiral Graf Spee, it was extended one deck higher. Deutschland's underwater protection consisted of a 45 mm (1.8 in) thick torpedo bulkhead; Admiral Scheer's and Admiral Graf Spee's bulkheads were reduced to 40 mm (1.6 in). Deutschland had a 18 mm (0.71 in) thick upper deck and a main armored deck that ranged in thickness from 18–40 mm. Admiral Scheer and Admiral Graf Spee had 17 mm (0.67 in) main decks and armored decks that ranged in thickness from 17–45 mm. The armored deck in Deutschland and Admiral Scheer did not extend over the entire width of the ship due to weight; this matter was rectified in Admiral Graf Spee. Likewise, the torpedo bulkheads for Deutschland and Admiral Scheer stopped at the inside of the double-bottom but in Admiral Graf Spee extended to the outer hull. The ships' forward conning tower had 150 mm (5.9 in) thick sides with a 50 mm (2 in) thick roof, while the aft conning tower was less well protected, with 50 mm thick sides and a 20 mm (0.79 in) thick roof. The main battery turrets had 140 mm (5.5 in) thick faces and 85 mm (3.3 in) thick sides. Their roofs ranged in thickness from 85 to 105 mm (3.3 to 4.1 in). The 15 cm guns were armored with 10 mm (0.39 in) gun shields for splinter protection. Admiral Scheer and Admiral Graf Spee had some improvements in armor thickness. The barbettes, 100 mm thick in Deutschland, became 125 mm for the two sisters. Admiral Scheer had the belt somewhat improved, and Admiral Graf Spee had a much more improved 100 mm belt, instead of 50–80 mm. The armored deck was improved as well, and some places had up to 70 mm thickness.

== Classification ==
The Kriegsmarine initially classified the ships as "Panzerschiffe" (armored ships), but in February 1940 it reclassified the two survivors of the class as heavy cruisers. Due to their heavy armament of six 28 cm (11 in) guns, high speed and long cruising range, the class was more capable of high seas operation than the old pre-dreadnought battleships they replaced; for this reason, they were referred to as "pocket battleships", particularly in the British press. In 1938 Jane's Fighting Ships stated the Deutschland-class "[a]re officially rated as 'Armoured Ships' (Panzerschiffe) and popularly referred to as 'Pocket Battleships'. Actually, they are equivalent to armoured cruisers of an exceptionally powerful type."

== Construction ==
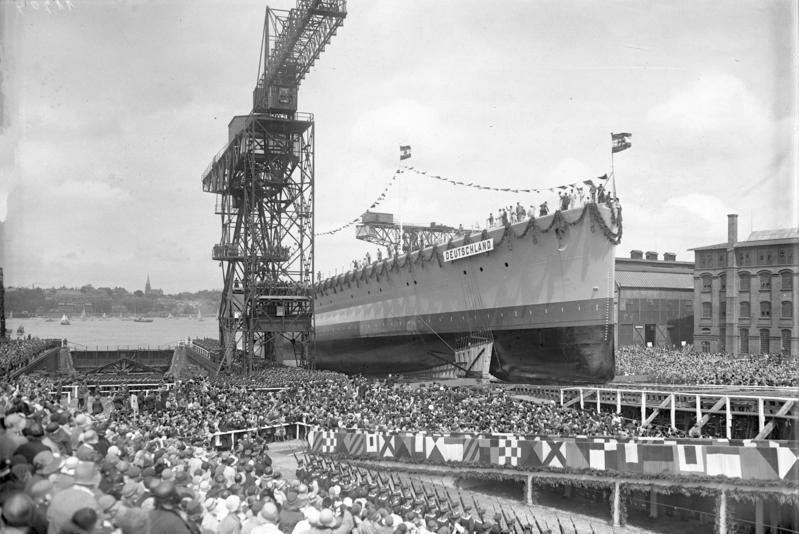
Deutschland at her launching

Deutschland was laid down at the Deutsche Werke shipyard in Kiel on 5 February 1929, under the contract name "Panzerschiff A", as a replacement for the old battleship Preussen. Work began under construction number 219. The ship was launched on 19 May 1931; at her launching, she was christened by German Chancellor Heinrich Brüning. The ship accidentally started sliding down the slipway while Brüning was giving his christening speech. After the completion of fitting out work, initial sea trials began in November 1932. The ship was commissioned into the Reichsmarine on 1 April 1933.

Serious political opposition to the ships continued after the authorization for Deutschland, and a political crisis over the second ship, Admiral Scheer, was averted only after the Social Democrats abstained from voting. As a result of the opposition, "Panzerschiff B" was not authorized until 1931. A replacement for the old battleship Lothringen, her keel was laid on 25 June 1931 at the Reichsmarinewerft shipyard in Wilhelmshaven, under construction number 123. The ship was launched on 1 April 1933; at her launching, she was christened by Marianne Besserer, the daughter of Admiral Reinhard Scheer, after whom the ship was named. She was completed slightly over a year and a half later on 12 November 1934, the day she was commissioned into the German fleet.

Admiral Graf Spee, the third and final member of the class, was also ordered by the Reichsmarine from the Reichsmarinewerft shipyard in Wilhelmshaven. She was ordered under the contract name "Panzerschiff C" to replace the battleship Braunschweig. Her keel was laid on 1 October 1932, under construction number 125. The ship was launched on 30 June 1934; at her launching, she was christened by the daughter of Admiral Maximilian von Spee, after whom the ship was named. She was completed slightly over a year and a half later on 6 January 1936, the day she was commissioned into the German fleet.

== Possible conversion ==
After Hitler had given the order in late January 1943 for the two remaining ships to be scrapped, the possibility of instead converting them into aircraft carriers was discussed. The hulls would have been lengthened by approximately 20 meters (66 ft), which would have used 2,000 tons of steel and employed 400 workmen. Conversion time was estimated at two years. Their flight deck would have been only 10 meters (33 ft) shorter than that of the Admiral Hipper-class heavy cruiser Seydlitz, which had been prepared for conversion in 1942, and they would still have attained 28 knots. This plan was not pursued.

== Ships in class ==
Construction data
Ship	Namesake	Builder	Laid down	Launched	Commissioned	Fate
Deutschland (Note: Renamed Lützow, 15 February 1940)	Germany	Deutsche Werke, Kiel	5 February 1929	19 May 1931	1 April 1933	Sunk in weapons tests, July 1947
Admiral Scheer	Reinhard Scheer	Reichsmarinewerft, Wilhelmshaven	25 June 1931	1 April 1933	12 November 1934	Sunk following air attack, 9 April 1945
Admiral Graf Spee	Maximilian von Spee	Reichsmarinewerft, Wilhelmshaven	1 October 1932	30 June 1934	6 January 1936	Scuttled following surface action, 17 December 1939

=== Deutschland ===
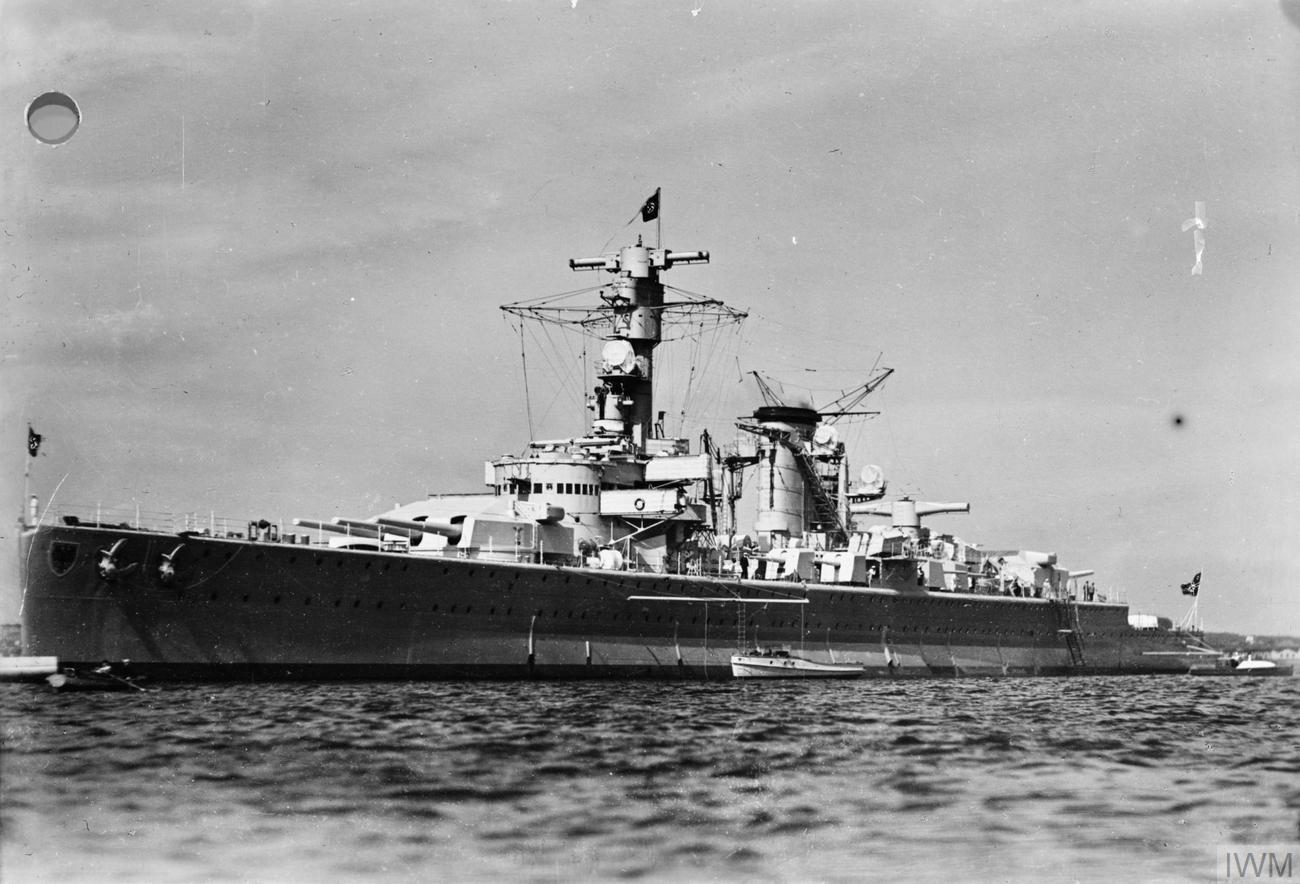
Deutschland in 1936

Deutschland saw significant action with the Kriegsmarine, including several non-intervention patrols, during which she was attacked by Republican bombers. At the outbreak of World War II, she was cruising the North Atlantic, prepared to attack Allied merchant traffic. Bad weather hampered her efforts, and she sank or captured only three vessels before returning to Germany, after which she was renamed Lützow. She then participated in Operation Weserübung, the invasion of Norway. Damaged at the Battle of Drøbak Sound, she was recalled to Germany for repairs. While en route, she was torpedoed by a British submarine and seriously damaged.

Repairs were completed by March 1941, and in June Lützow steamed to Norway. While en route, she was torpedoed by a British bomber, necessitating significant repairs that lasted until May 1942. She returned to Norway to join the forces arrayed against Allied shipping to the Soviet Union. She ran aground during a planned attack on convoy PQ 17, which necessitated another return to Germany for repairs. She next saw action at the Battle of the Barents Sea with the heavy cruiser Admiral Hipper, which ended with a failure to destroy the convoy JW 51B. Engine problems forced a series of repairs culminating in a complete overhaul at the end of 1943, after which the ship remained in the Baltic. Sunk in the Kaiserfahrt in April 1945 by Royal Air Force (RAF) bombers, Lützow was used as a gun battery to support German troops fighting the Soviet Army until 4 May 1945, when she was disabled by her crew. Raised by the Soviet Navy in 1947, she was reportedly broken up for scrap over the next two years, according to Western works that did not have access to Soviet documents at the time. The historian Hans Georg Prager examined the former Soviet archives in the early 2000s, and discovered that Lützow actually had been sunk in weapons tests in July 1947.

=== Admiral Scheer ===
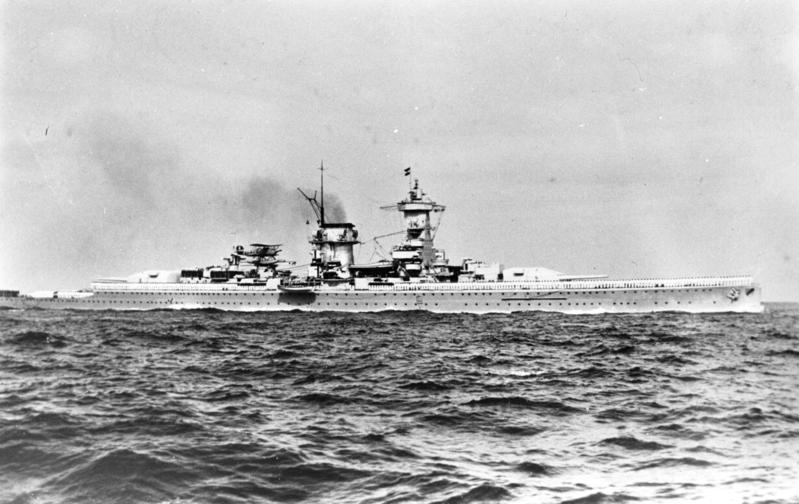
Admiral Scheer in 1934

Admiral Scheer saw heavy service with the German Navy, including several deployments to Spain during the Spanish Civil War, to participate in non-intervention patrols. While off Spain, she bombarded the port of Almería following the Republican attack on her sister Deutschland. At the outbreak of World War II, she remained in port for a periodic refit. Her first operation during World War II was a commerce raiding operation into the southern Atlantic Ocean that started in late October 1940. While on the operation, she also made a brief foray into the Indian Ocean. During the raiding mission, she sank 113,223 gross register tons (GRT) of shipping, making her the most successful capital ship surface raider of the war.

Following her return to Germany, she was deployed to northern Norway to interdict shipping to the Soviet Union. She was part of the abortive attack on Convoy PQ 17 with the battleship Tirpitz; the operation was broken off after surprise was lost. She also conducted Operation Wunderland, a sortie into the Kara Sea. After returning to Germany at the end of 1942, the ship served as a training ship until the end of 1944, when she was used to support ground operations against the Soviet Army. She was sunk by British bombers on 9 April 1945 and partially scrapped; the remainder of the wreck lies buried beneath a quay.

=== Admiral Graf Spee ===
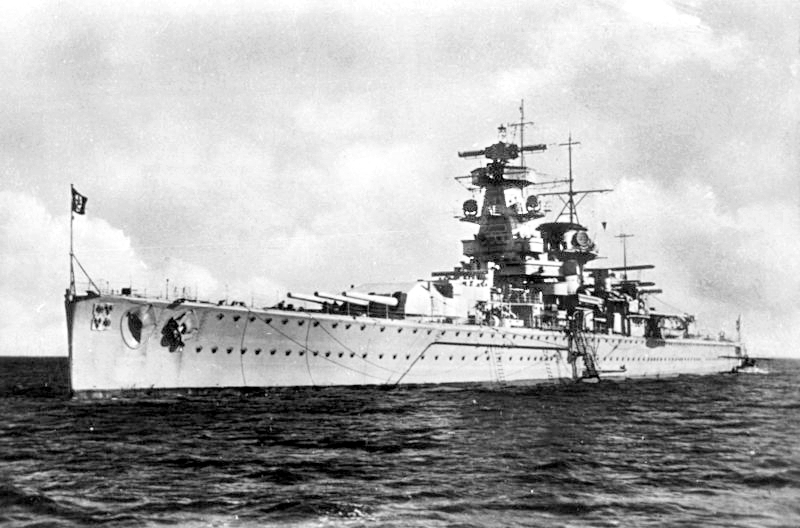
Admiral Graf Spee in 1936

Admiral Graf Spee conducted extensive training in the Baltic and Atlantic before participating in five non-intervention patrols during the Spanish Civil War in 1936–1938. She also represented Germany during the Coronation Review for King George VI in May 1937. Admiral Graf Spee was deployed to the South Atlantic in the weeks before the outbreak of World War II, to be positioned in merchant sea lanes once war was declared. Between September and December 1939, the ship sank nine ships totaling 50,089 GRT; in response, the British and French navies formed several hunter-killer groups to track her down. These forces included four aircraft carriers, two battleships, and one battlecruiser.

Admiral Graf Spee operated in concert with the supply ship Altmark. Admiral Graf Spee was eventually confronted by three British cruisers off Uruguay at the Battle of the River Plate on 13 December 1939. She inflicted heavy damage on the British ships, but suffered damage as well, and was forced to put into port at Montevideo. Convinced by false reports of superior British naval forces approaching his ship and the poor state of his own engines, Hans Langsdorff, the commander of the ship, ordered the vessel to be scuttled. Langsdorff committed suicide three days after the scuttling. The ship was partially broken up in situ, though part of the ship remains visible above the surface of the water.

== See also ==
- Design B-65 cruiser - Japanese proposed counterpart
- Alaska-class cruiser - US counterpart
