= M-class cruiser =

Planned class of German light cruisers

- Illustration of the M-class design

Class overview
- Builders: Kriegsmarinewerft Wilhelmshaven
- Operators: Kriegsmarine
- Preceded by: Leipzig-class cruiser
- Succeeded by: None
- Built: 1938–1939
- Planned: 6
- Cancelled: 6

General characteristics
- Type: Light cruiser
- Displacement: 8,500 t (8,366 long tons; 9,370 short tons) (M, N, O, P); 9,300 t (9,153 long tons; 10,251 short tons) (Q, R)
- Length: 183 m (600 ft 5 in) (M, N, O, P); 196 m (643 ft 1 in) (Q, R)
- Beam: 17 m (55 ft 9 in) (M, N, O, P); 18 m (59 ft 1 in) (Q, R)
- Draft: 5.42 m (17 ft 9 in) (M, N, O, P); 5.40 m (17 ft 9 in) (Q, R)
- Installed power: 4 × water-tube boilers
- Propulsion: 2 × steam turbines; 4 × diesel engines
- Speed: 35.5 knots (65.7 km/h; 40.9 mph) (M, N, O, P); 36 knots (67 km/h; 41 mph) (Q, R)
- Range: 8,000 nmi (15,000 km) at 19 kn (35 km/h) (M, N, O, P); 12,000 nmi (22,000 km) at 19 knots (35 km/h; 22 mph) (Q, R)
- Complement: 28 officers; 892 men
- Armament: 8 × 15 cm (5.9 in) guns; 4 × 8.8 cm (3.5 in) AA guns; 8 × 3.7 cm (1.5 in) AA guns; 4 × 2 cm (0.79 in) AA guns; 8 × 53 cm (21 in) torpedo tubes; 60 mines
- Armor: Belt: 2 in (51 mm); Deck: 1 in (25 mm); Turret: 1 in (25 mm)
- Aircraft carried: 2 × Arado 196 seaplanes
- Aviation facilities: 1 × steam catapult

The M-class cruisers were a class of light cruisers planned, but never built, by Nazi Germany's Kriegsmarine before World War II. The ships were designed for commerce raiding in the Atlantic Ocean. The design for the first four ships suffered from a number of problems, and so the fifth and sixth ships were substantially redesigned.

The name of the class is taken from the letter designating the first projected unit. As long as the ships were not named, they were referred to by letters assigned in the chronological order of their planned construction. The first planned unit would have been the thirteenth German cruiser and was therefore listed as cruiser M in the navy's documents. Had any of the ships been built, the class would have been named after the first completed unit.

== Development and cancellation ==
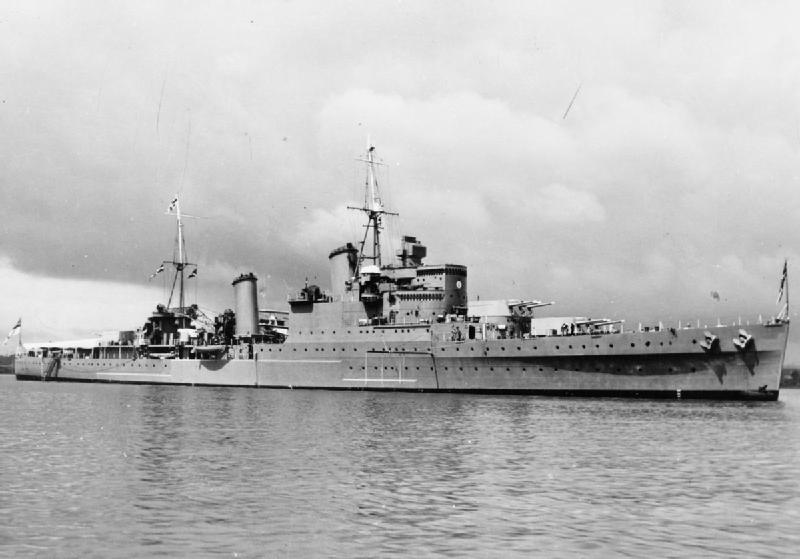
HMS Southampton, one of the foreign cruisers that influenced the M-class design

In the early 1930s, Adolf Hitler began a rearmament program in Germany. He signed the Anglo-German Naval Agreement in 1935, which allowed Germany to build up its navy to 35 percent of the strength of the British Royal Navy and effectively repudiated the restrictions of the Treaty of Versailles on the German fleet. Versailles had limited the German fleet's cruiser strength to six vessels of 6,000 metric tons (5,900 long tons) displacement.

The M class was intended for use as a scout for the commerce raiding squadrons envisioned under German strategic thinking at the time, which would be formalized as the Plan Z construction program. The ships design process started in 1936; the ships were intended for long-range commerce raiding. They were an improvement over previous designs like the Königsberg and Leipzig classes, which suffered from insufficient range to be effective commerce raiders. However, the requirements placed on the design—high maximum and cruising speeds, long range, heavy armament, and armor sufficient to withstand 15 cm (5.9 in) shells, all on a displacement no more than 8,000 t (7,900 long tons; 8,800 short tons) were deemed impossible by the design staff. In July 1937, the Oberbefehlshaber der Marine (commander in chief of the navy) requested proposals from both the naval design staff as well as private dockyards. None of the designs by the dockyards were practical, and so the official design, which only met some of the requirements, was chosen.

During further development of the design, serious flaws became apparent, including the weakness of both the main battery and anti-aircraft armament, as well as the insufficiently thick armor protection. The stepped arrangement of the deck armor wasted space and was therefore impractical. The layout of the propulsion system was also problematic; both turbines were in the same engine room, and therefore each were vulnerable to disabling if the other was damaged. Their crew spaces were also insufficient for long-range cruises. As a result, the design was heavily modified for the last two ships of the class, Q and R. The initial design borrowed on contemporary British and French ships, the Southampton class and La Galissonnière class, respectively. The distribution of the M-class ships' side armor was the most obvious influence of the Southampton-class design.

The contract for M was assigned to Deutsche Werke in Kiel under the construction number 263. N followed at the Kriegsmarinewerft in Wilhelmshaven, as number 129. O—construction number 606—was assigned to Germaniawerft in Kiel, but on 8 August 1939, the contract was transferred to the Kriegsmarinewerft. P was also assigned to Germaniawerft, under number 607. Q was assigned to the Schichau-Werke in Danzig, and the contract for R was awarded to the Deutsche Werke. Only the keels for M and N were laid—in 1938—but construction was halted on 19 and 21 September 1939, respectively, after the start of World War II. Both hulls were broken up on the stocks shortly thereafter.

== Design ==
=== General characteristics ===
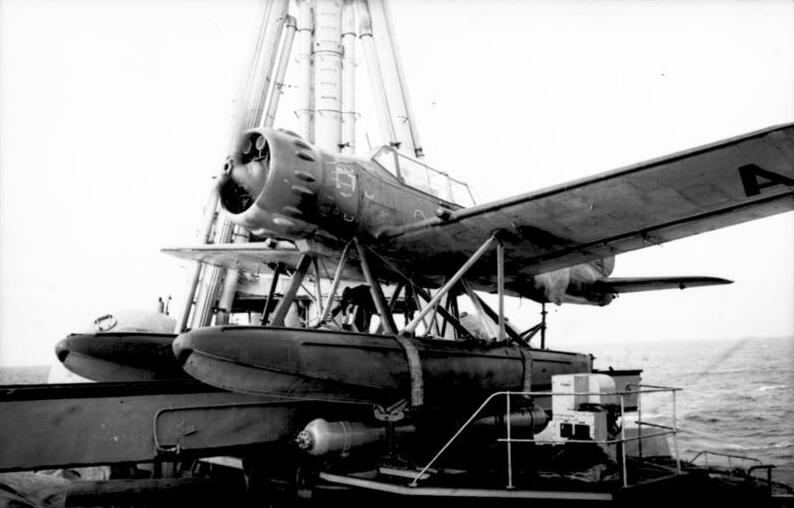
An Ar 196 on board the heavy cruiser Admiral Hipper

The first four M-class ships—M, N, O, and P—were 178 m (584 ft) long at the waterline, and 183 m (600 ft 5 in) long overall. They had a beam of 17 m (55 ft 9 in) and a draft of 5.42 m (17 ft 9 in) standard, 7.25 m (23 ft 9 in) forward, and 6.03 m (19 ft 9 in) aft. The ships had a designed displacement of 8,500 t (8,400 long tons; 9,400 short tons), and would have displaced 7,800 t (7,700 long tons; 8,600 short tons) at standard load and 10,400 t (10,200 long tons; 11,500 short tons) fully laden. The last two ships—Q and R—were enlarged versions: 188 m (616 ft 10 in) long at the waterline and 196 m (643 ft 1 in) overall. Their beams were 1 m (3 ft 3 in) wider, at 18 m (59 ft 1 in). Their draft was lower at 5.4 m (17 ft 9 in). They were designed to displace 9,300 t (9,200 long tons; 10,300 short tons), and would have displaced 8,568 t (8,433 long tons; 9,445 short tons) standard. Full load figures are not known.

All six ships were to have steel-made, and up to 85% welded construction. The design called for fifteen watertight compartments and a double bottom for 78% of the length of the hull. The ships had a crew of 28 officers and 892 men. They were designed to carry one picket boat, a barge, a launch, and two cutters. They would have carried a pair of Arado Ar 196 seaplanes for reconnaissance, which would have been launched with a single steam catapult.

All six ships were intended to use two sets of Brown, Boveri & Cie and Wagner steam turbines or Marine-type turbines built by Germaniawerft and four MAN double-acting 12-cylinder two-stroke diesel engines. Q and R however, were to be equipped with an additional four diesels, for a total of eight. The turbines were powered by four Wagner ultra-high pressure water-tube boilers, designed to put out 58 atmospheres of pressure. The propulsion system drove three screws, although four were considered for Q and R. The ships' electrical power was supplied by four generators that produced 2,400 kW at 220 volts.

=== Armament and armor ===
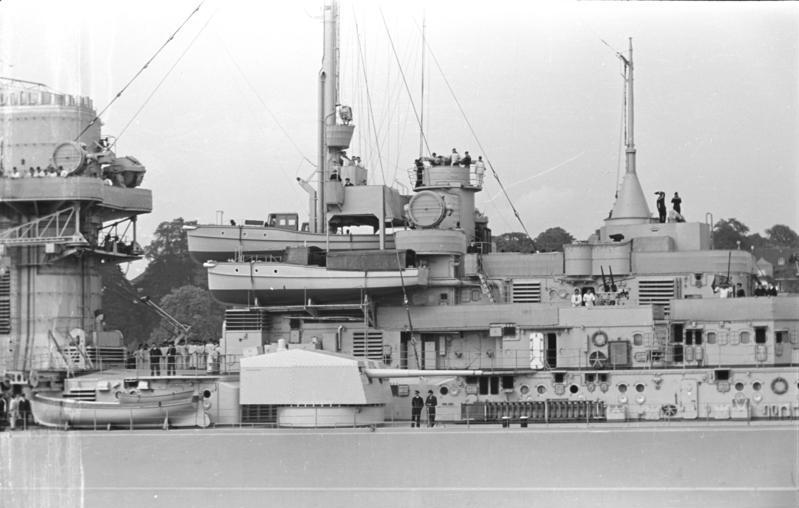
One of the 15 cm turrets on the battleship Bismarck, similar to what would have been mounted on the M class

All six ships were armed with the same set of weaponry. The primary armament consisted of eight 15 cm L/55 quick-firing guns mounted in four twin turrets, in superfiring pairs fore and aft. The guns had a total of 960 shells, for 120 rounds per gun. The 15 cm twin turrets were C/34 mounts—the same type as those fitted to the Bismarck- and Scharnhorst-class battleships, as well as a number of other designs. The turrets allowed depression to -10 degrees and elevation to 40 degrees, which enabled a maximum range of 22,000 m (24,000 yd). The 15 cm guns had a rate of fire of between 6 and 8 45.3 kg (100 lb) rounds per minute, at a muzzle velocity of 875 meters per second (2,871 ft/s). The guns used two propellant charges: a 14.15 kg (31.2 lb) RPC/38 fore charge and a 23.5 kg (52 lb) main charge in a brass cartridge.

The ships carried four 8.8 cm L/76 anti-aircraft guns in two twin turrets, aft of the main superstructure. The 8.8 cm guns were supplied with 1,600 shells, for 400 rounds per gun. These guns fired 19.8 kg (44 lb) high explosive shells at a rate of fire of 15 to 20 rounds per minute and a muzzle velocity of 950 m/s (3,117 ft/s). The guns could elevate to 80 degrees, which allowed them to hit targets flying at 12,400 m (40,700 ft). The M-class ships were also equipped with eight 3.7 cm AA guns in twin mounts centered on the superstructure. They had a total of 9,600 shells. The anti-aircraft weaponry was supplemented with four 2 cm guns, each of which had 2,000 rounds. The ships were also armed with eight deck-mounted 53 cm (21 in) torpedo tubes and approximately 60 mines.

The ships were to have been protected with Krupp and Wotan, Hart ("Wotan", Hard) armor plating. The inner layer of the armor belt was 50 mm thick in critical areas amidships, and tapered down to zero protection at the stern and bow. The outer layer was 30 mm amidships; also tapering down to zero at both ends of the ships. The flat portion of the decks were 20 mm thick, with 35 mm thick sloped sides that connected to the bottom of the belt armor. The conning tower had a roof that was 50 mm thick and sides 100 mm thick. The gun turrets had the same armor protection as the preceding light cruiser Nürnberg: the sides were 35 mm thick, the faces were 80 mm thick, the roofs ranged in thickness from 20–35 mm. The armor protecting the turret barbettes was 60 mm thick.
