= German cruiser Nürnberg =

Leipzig-class cruiser

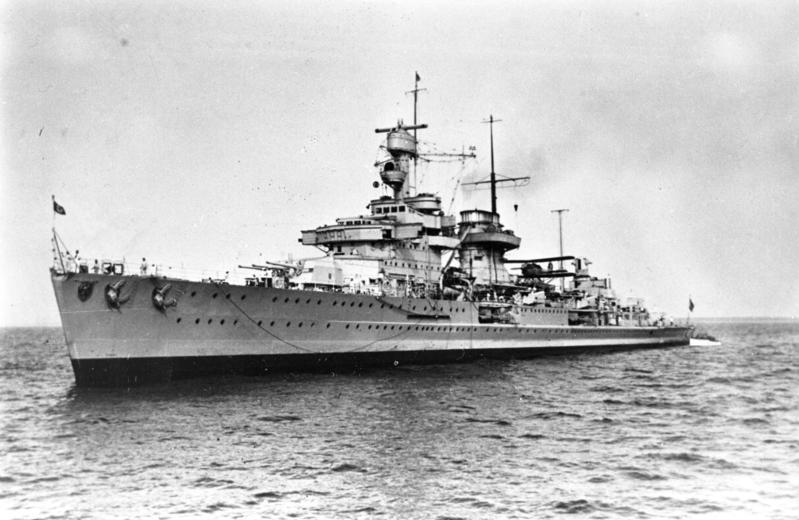
- Nürnberg, probably before World War II

History

Germany
- Name: Nürnberg
- Namesake: City of Nuremberg
- Ordered: 1933
- Laid down: 1934
- Launched: 6 December 1934
- Commissioned: 2 November 1935
- Fate: Surrendered 1945. Assigned as a war prize to the Soviet Navy

Soviet Union
- Name: Admiral Makarov (Адмирал Макаров)
- Namesake: Admiral Stepan Makarov
- Acquired: 19 December 1945
- Reclassified: Training cruiser, 1954
- Fate: Scrapped 1959 or 1960

General characteristics
- Class & type: Leipzig-class cruiser
- Displacement: Full load: 9,040 metric tons (8,900 long tons; 9,960 short tons)
- Length: 181.3 m (595 ft)
- Beam: 16.3 m (53 ft)
- Draft: 5.74 m (18.8 ft)
- Installed power: 6 × water-tube boilers; 60,000 PS (44,000 kW) (turbines); 12,400 PS (9,100 kW) (diesels)
- Propulsion: 2 × steam turbines; 4 × diesel engines; 3 × screw propellers
- Speed: 32 knots (59 km/h; 37 mph)
- Range: 3,900 nautical miles (7,200 km; 4,500 mi) at 10 knots (19 km/h; 12 mph)
- Complement: 25 officers; 648 enlisted men
- Armament: 9 × 15 cm (5.9 in) SK C/25 guns; 8 × 8.8 cm (3.5 in) SK C/32 guns; 8 × 3.7 cm (1.5 in) SK C/30 guns; 4 × 2 cm (0.79 in) guns; 12 × 53.3 cm (21 in) torpedo tubes
- Armor: Belt armor: 50 mm (2 in); Deck: 30 mm (1.2 in); Conning tower: 100 mm (3.9 in)
- Aircraft carried: 2 × Arado 196 floatplanes

Nürnberg was a German light cruiser of the Leipzig class built for the Kriegsmarine. She was named after the city of Nuremberg and had one sister ship, Leipzig. Nürnberg was laid down in 1934, launched in December of that year, and completed in November 1935. She was armed with a main battery of nine 15 cm (5.9 in) guns in three triple turrets and could steam at a speed of 32 knots (59 km/h; 37 mph). Nürnberg was the longest-serving major warship of the Kriegsmarine, and the only one to see active service after the end of World War II, though not in a German navy.

In the late 1930s, Nürnberg took part in the non-intervention patrols during the Spanish Civil War without major incident. After the outbreak of World War II in September 1939, she was used to lay defensive minefields off the German coast. She was thereafter used to escort offensive mine-layers in the North Sea until she was torpedoed by a British submarine in December 1939. She was thereafter used as a training ship in the Baltic Sea for most of the rest of the war, apart from a short deployment to Norway from November 1942 to April 1943. In January 1945, she was assigned to mine-laying duties in the Skagerrak, but severe shortages of fuel permitted only one such operation.

After the end of the war, Nürnberg was seized by the Royal Navy and ultimately awarded to the Soviet Union as war reparations. In December 1945, a Soviet crew took over the ship, and the following month took her to Tallinn, where she was renamed Admiral Makarov. She served in the Soviet Navy, first in the 8th Fleet, then as a training cruiser based in Kronstadt. By 1960, she had been broken up for scrap.

== Design ==
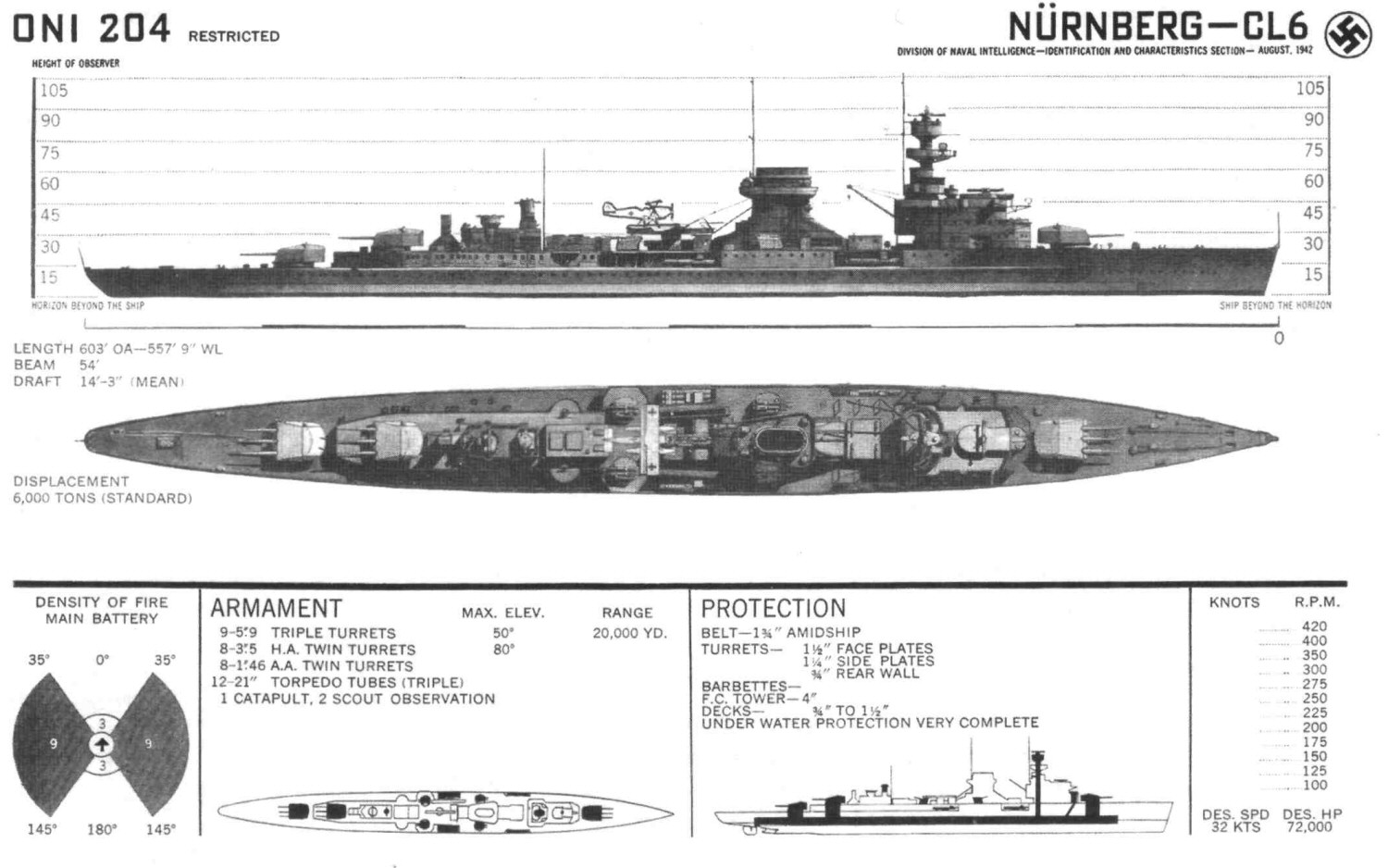
Line-drawing of Nürnberg

Nürnberg was 181.3 meters (595 ft) long overall and had a beam of 16.3 m (53 ft) and a maximum draft of 5.74 m (18.8 ft) forward. She displaced 9,040 metric tons (8,900 long tons; 9,960 short tons) at full load. Nürnberg had a crew of 25 officers and 648 enlisted men. She was fitted with a catapult and a crane to handle two Heinkel He 60 floatplanes, though these were later replaced with Arado Ar 196 models.

Her propulsion system consisted of two steam turbines and four MAN two-stroke double-acting diesel engines. Steam for the turbines was provided by six Marine-type, double-ended, oil-fired water-tube boilers. The ship's propulsion system provided a top speed of 32 knots (59 km/h; 37 mph) and a range of approximately 3,900 nautical miles (7,200 km; 4,500 mi) at 10 knots (19 km/h; 12 mph) using only the diesel engines.

The ship was armed with a main battery of nine 15 cm (5.9 in) SK C/25 guns mounted in three triple gun turrets. One was located forward, and two were placed in a superfiring pair aft, all on the centerline. They were supplied with between 1,080 and 1,500 rounds of ammunition, for between 120 and 166 shells per gun. The ship was also equipped with eight 8.8 cm (3.5 in) SK C/32 anti-aircraft guns, eight 3.7 cm (1.5 in) SK C/30 anti-aircraft guns, and several 2 cm (0.79 in) anti-aircraft guns, though the number of the latter changed over her career. Nürnberg also carried four triple 53.3 cm (21.0 in) torpedo tube mounts located amidships; they were supplied with twenty-four torpedoes. She was also capable of carrying 120 naval mines. The ship was protected by an armored deck that was 30 mm (1.2 in) thick amidships and an armor belt that was 50 mm (2 in) thick. The conning tower had 100 mm (3.9 in) thick sides.

=== Modifications ===
After the outbreak of war, the ship was fitted with a degaussing coil to protect her against magnetic mines. In March 1941 her aft pair of triple torpedo tubes was removed, and installed on the battleship Scharnhorst. In 1942, the ship's aircraft handling equipment and aft torpedo tubes were removed. Throughout the war, her radar suite was upgraded; in March 1941, she was equipped with FuMO 21 radar and in early 1942, a FuMO 25 radar set was installed. The latter was a search radar for surface targets and low-flying aircraft at low range. The FuMO 21 set was replaced by the short-range FuMO 63 Hohentwiel 50-centimeter radar. Nürnberg was also fitted with four Metox radar warning receivers.

The ship's anti-aircraft battery was improved over the course of World War II. In late 1942, a pair of Army-variant 2 cm Flakvierling quadruple mounts were installed, one on the navigating bridge and the other on top of the aft superfiring turret. In May 1944, the navy proposed installing several Bofors 40 mm guns, but most of these weapons were diverted to other uses, and only two guns were installed. One was mounted on the bridge and the other where the catapult had been located. Two Navy-pattern Flakvierlings were added; one replaced the Army model atop the aft superfiring turret, and the other was placed in front of the anti-aircraft fire director. The Army-pattern Flakvierlings were moved to the main deck. In December 1944, another revised anti-aircraft plan was proposed, this time incorporating the new 3.7 cm FlaK 43 gun, of which there were to be eight, along with two Flakvierlings and ten 2 cm twin mounts. Germany's wartime situation by the end of 1944 prevented these changes from being made, however.

== Service history ==
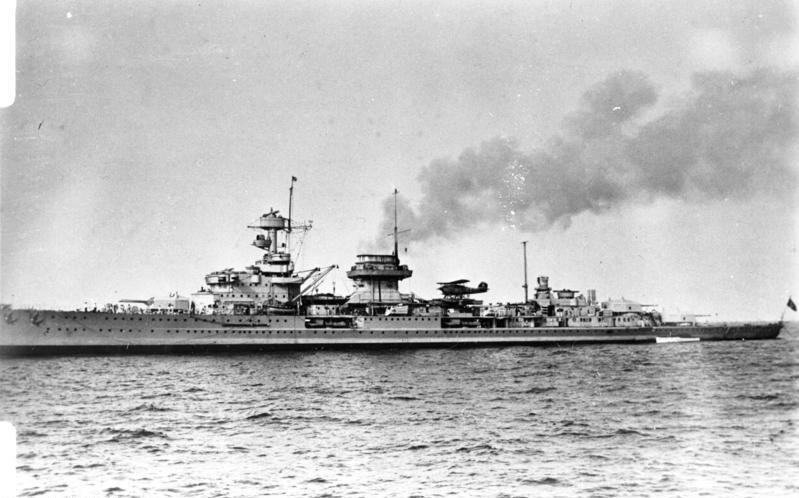
Nürnberg before the war

Nürnberg was laid down in 1934 at the Deutsche Werke shipyard in Kiel. She was launched on 6 December 1934 and completed in less than a year, being commissioned on 2 November 1935. The ship thereafter worked up in the Baltic Sea until April 1936, when she joined Köln and Leipzig for a training cruise into the Atlantic. At this time, she was made the flagship of the reconnaissance forces of the German Navy. The three cruisers then returned to the Baltic for additional maneuvers. Nürnberg participated the non-intervention patrols during the Spanish Civil War of 1936–1939. On her initial deployment in 1936, she flew the flag of Konteradmiral Hermann Boehm. Over the course of the conflict, Nürnberg conducted four patrols off Spain, but did not encounter any belligerent forces, with the exception of a claimed attack by an unidentified submarine south of the Balearic Islands on 16 July 1937.

In September 1937, Nürnberg took part in fleet maneuvers with the heavy cruisers Admiral Graf Spee and Deutschland, the light cruisers Leipzig and Karlsruhe, and several destroyers. The first three months of 1938 were spent in the Baltic, after which Nürnberg went into dock for a periodic refit. In June, she went on a training cruise to Norway and returned to Germany the following month. In August, she was present at the fleet review held in Kiel for Adolf Hitler and the visiting regent of Hungary, Miklós Horthy. Nürnberg joined the fleet that was sent to Memel in March 1939 to seize the region. After completing the occupation, Nürnberg joined Admiral Graf Spee, Leipzig, and Köln for a training cruise to the Mediterranean Sea, which included several stops in Spanish ports. After returning to Germany in May, she resumed training in the Baltic.

=== World War II ===
==== 1939–1941 ====
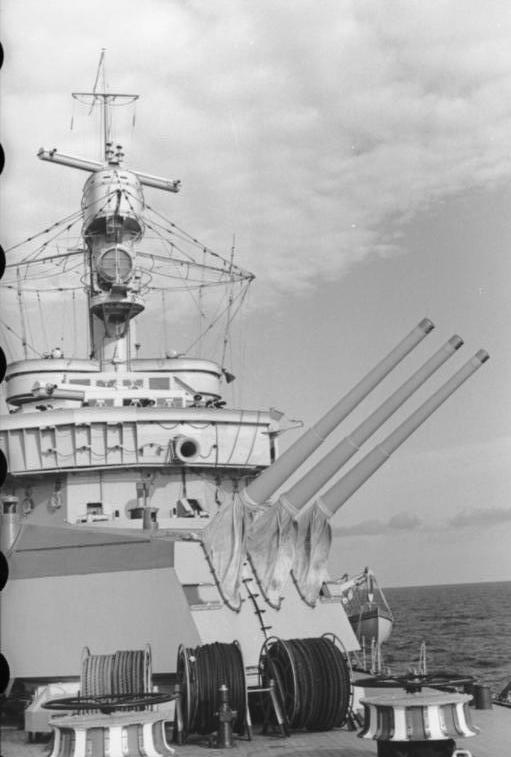
Nürnberg's forward gun turret in September 1940

At the outbreak of World War II on 1 September 1939, Nürnberg was assigned to the blockade force that was intended to prevent the Polish Navy from escaping from the Baltic. Despite the Germans' efforts, several Polish destroyers and submarines escaped to Britain, where they continued the war. On 3 September, Nürnberg and the rest of the cruisers were withdrawn to the North Sea to lay a series of defensive minefields to protect the German coastline. She returned to the Baltic for training exercises in October. The following month, she was transferred back to the North Sea, where she was tasked with escorting destroyers laying minefields off the British coast. On 4–6 December, the ship conducted a mining operation off Kristiansand, Norway.

On 13 December, while escorting a group of destroyers returning from a mine-laying operation off the British coast, the Royal Navy submarine HMS Salmon launched a spread of torpedoes at the German flotilla. Two torpedo tracks were spotted heading toward Nürnberg, and the ship turned hard to port in an attempt to evade them. One passed harmlessly ahead of the ship, but the second struck her in the bow. Nürnberg reduced speed to 12 knots (22 km/h; 14 mph) to allow her crew to inspect the damage, when three more torpedo tracks were spotted to port. The ship immediately accelerated to full speed and turned to starboard; the torpedoes exploded in the cruiser's wake. The hit caused some minor flooding and minimal damage, but her watertight bulkheads held. The Germans spotted Salmon and briefly engaged her with Nürnberg's rearmost main battery turret, but to no effect. Nürnberg thereafter got underway at a speed of 18 knots (33 km/h; 21 mph) and made for port.

While en route back to Germany on 14 December, Nürnberg and Leipzig, which had also been torpedoed by Salmon, came under further British attacks. Twelve Vickers Wellington bombers from No. 99 Squadron RAF located the two cruisers but were unable to release their bombs due to the low cloud. They were intercepted in the vicinity of Spiekeroog and Wangerooge by fighters from II. Gruppe (2nd group) of Jagdgeschwader 77 (JG 77—77th Fighter Wing) under the leadership of Oberstleutnant Carl-Alfred Schumacher. JG 77 pilots claimed seven and one probable bomber shot down, including one claimed by Unteroffizier Herbert Kutscha. RAF records show that six of the twelve bombers were lost as a result of the attack.. The submarine HMS Ursula also unsuccessfully attacked the damaged cruiser that day, just before she entered the Kiel Canal at Brunsbüttel. After arriving in Kiel, Nürnberg went into drydock at Deutsche Werke for repairs, which lasted until April 1940.

In early June 1940, Nürnberg's commander, Kapitän zur See (KzS) Otto Klüber, was informed that the ship would not participate in Operation Juno, a sortie by the battleships Gneisenau and Scharnhorst. Instead, she was transferred to Norway, departing Kiel on 10 June under the escort of the torpedo boats Falke and Jaguar. On 12 June, the torpedo boats were sent to Stavanger for fuel, and in the meantime, Nürnberg steamed a zig-zag course at 27 knots (50 km/h; 31 mph) to evade any submarines that might be in the area. The following day, the 2nd Minesweeper Flotilla took over her escort duty off Trondheim. On 17 June, Nürnberg reached Narvik, which was to be her base for the next month. During this period, one of her Arado Ar 196 floatplanes unsuccessfully attacked a British submarine. This was the only action the ship saw while in Norway. On 25 July, Nürnberg and several destroyers and torpedo boats escorted the damaged battleship Gneisenau, which had been torpedoed by a British submarine, from Trondheim to Kiel. The flotilla arrived in Kiel on 28 July. On 8 August, KzS Leo Kreisch replaced Klüber as the ship's commander. Nürnberg spent the rest of the year in the Baltic. The Italian Admiral Mavagini visited the ship while she was in Gotenhafen in September. A short refit was conducted at Deutsche Werke in October and November.

==== 1941–1945 ====
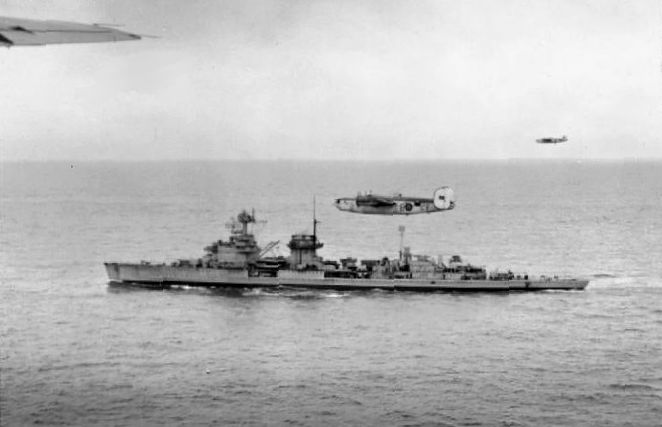
Nürnberg underway in May 1945, escorted by RAF Coastal Command Liberator maritime patrol bombers

On 15 February 1941, she was reclassified as a training cruiser and assigned to the Fleet Training Squadron, along with the other surviving light cruisers. These ships were tasked with training the crews for the U-boat arm, which was expanding rapidly to wage the Battle of the Atlantic. At the start of this period, many of her crewmen were themselves transferred to the U-boat fleet. After the outbreak of war with the Soviet Union in June 1941, Nürnberg was reassigned to the Baltic Fleet, which was centered on the new battleship Tirpitz. After it became clear that the Soviet Baltic Fleet did not intend to sortie, the German ships were dispersed. Nürnberg returned to her training duties for the remainder of the year. Another refit was conducted in January 1942; during this period, her aircraft equipment was removed, and her light anti-aircraft armament was increased. Allied air raids caused some damage, which delayed her return to service until 23 August.

She thereafter conducted sea trials until October, after which she was deployed to Norway. On 11 November, Nürnberg left Gotenhafen, bound for Trondheim. She arrived there on 18 November, and remained there until she was transferred to Bogen Bay outside Narvik on 2 December. There, she joined the fleet in being, which was, again, centered on Tirpitz. Nürnberg saw no action during this period. On 27 April 1943, Nürnberg left Narvik for German waters via Trondheim. After arriving in Kiel on 3 May, she had her machinery overhauled. After the work was completed in late May, she was assigned to the Training Squadron in the Baltic. Frequent crew changes kept the ship at a very low state of readiness. She remained in this duty through 1944, and she saw no action. She was not assigned to the shore bombardment units that supported the retreating German Army on the Eastern Front, unlike most of the other ships of the Training Squadron.

At the start of 1945, she was assigned to mine-laying duty in the Skagerrak, and was based in Oslo, Norway. She completed only one mine-laying operation, Operation Titus, on 13 January. The forces assigned to the operation included two destroyers, two torpedo boats, and a mine-layer; Nürnberg herself carried 130 mines. Severe fuel shortages prevented any further operations. On 24 January, she steamed to Copenhagen, where she remained until the end of the war, as she had only 270 long tons (270 t) of synthetic fuel oil aboard. On 5 May 1945, she received the ceasefire order, and on 22 May, the British cruisers HMS Devonshire and HMS Dido arrived to take over Nürnberg.

=== Post-war service ===
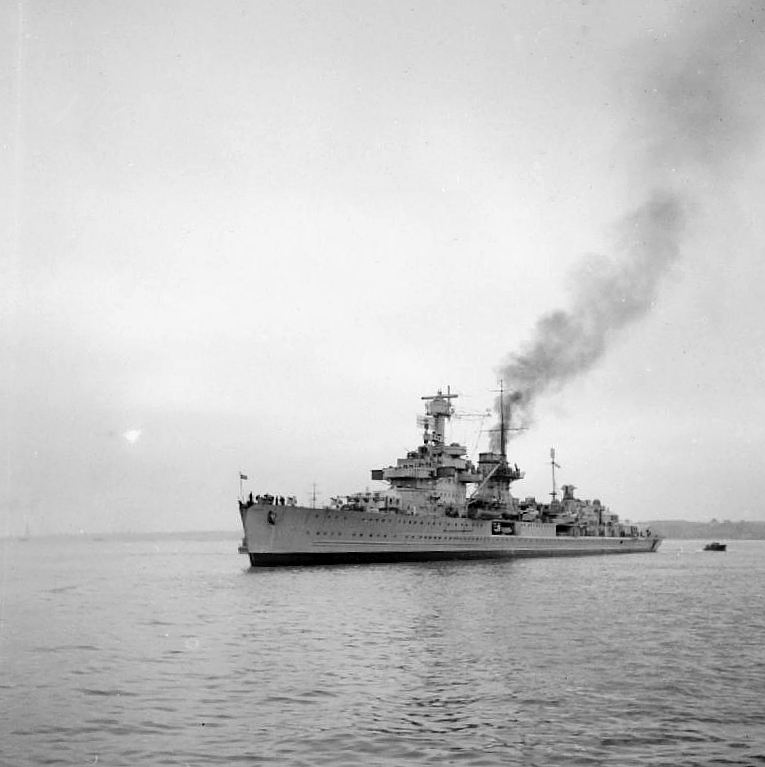
Nürnberg in Kiel in 1946, after being ceded to the Soviet Union

On 24 May, Nürnberg and the heavy cruiser Prinz Eugen sailed from Copenhagen under escort by Devonshire, Dido, and several other warships. The flotilla arrived in Wilhelmshaven on 28 May, and the German vessels remained there while their fates were determined at the Potsdam Conference. The Allies eventually decided to award Nürnberg to the Soviet Union. To prevent the Germans from scuttling their ships as they had done in 1919, the Allies formally seized the vessels on 19 December, while Nürnberg was in drydock. That day, the ship's Soviet crew came aboard. On 2 January, the Soviets took their seized warships, which also included the target ship Hessen, Hessen's radio-control vessel Blitz, the destroyer Z15 Erich Steinbrinck, and the torpedo boats T33 and T107, to Libau in present-day Latvia.

The Soviet Navy examined the ship in great detail after she arrived in Libau. The cruiser was then renamed Admiral Makarov and assigned to the 8th Fleet, based in Tallinn. In late 1948, she became the flagship of the 8th Fleet, under the command of Vice Admiral Fyodor Zozulya. In the early 1950s, three new Chapayev-class cruisers entered service, which prompted the Soviet Navy to withdraw Admiral Makarov from front line duties. She returned to her old job as a training cruiser, this time based in Kronstadt in mid-1954. During this period, most of her light anti-aircraft armament was removed, and new radars were installed. Her ultimate fate is unclear; she appears to have been placed out of service by May 1959, and was scrapped some time thereafter, reportedly by mid-1960. Nevertheless, she was the longest-surviving major warship of the Kriegsmarine, and the only one to see active service after the end of the war.
