= Soviet cruiser Admiral Zozulya =

Leading ship of the Soviet Navy Project 1134

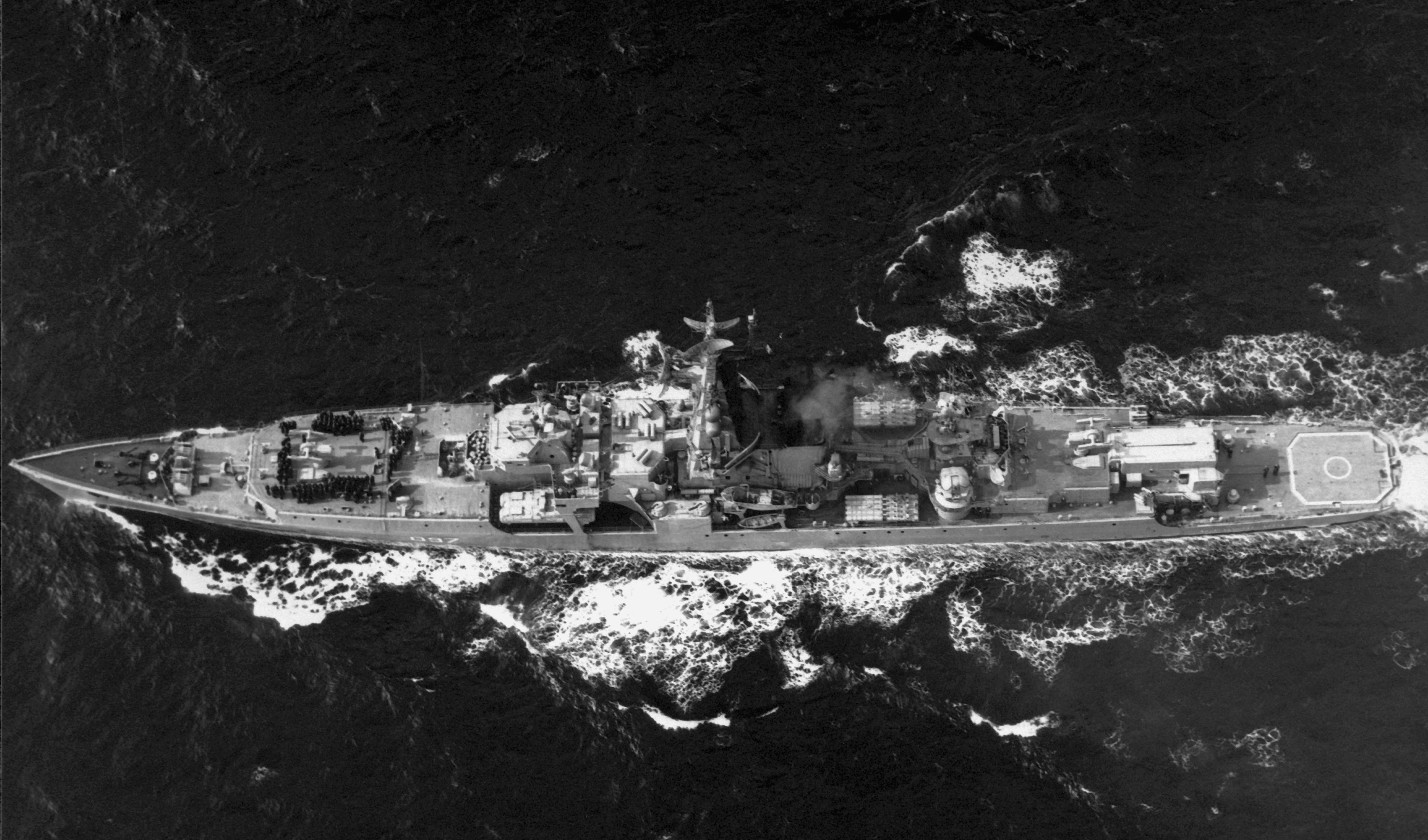
- Sister ship Vitse-Admiral Drozd underway on 29 January 1985.

History

Russia
- Name: Admiral Zozulya; (Адмирал Зозуля)
- Namesake: Fyodor Zozulya
- Builder: A.A. Zhdanov, Leningrad
- Yard number: 791
- Laid down: 26 July 1964
- Launched: 17 October 1965
- Commissioned: 8 October 1967
- Decommissioned: 5 July 1994
- Fate: Scrapped

General characteristics
- Class & type: Berkut-class cruiser
- Displacement: 5,340 tonnes (5,260 long tons; 5,890 short tons) standard, 7,170 tonnes (7,060 long tons; 7,900 short tons) full load
- Length: 156.2 m (512 ft 6 in)
- Beam: 16.8 m (55 ft 1 in)
- Draught: 5.6 m (18 ft 4 in)
- Propulsion: 2 shaft; 4 x KVN-98/64 boilers, 2 x TV-12 GTZA steam turbines, 46,000 shp (34,000 kW)
- Speed: 34 knots (63 km/h)
- Range: 10,500 nmi (19,446 km) at 14 knots (26 km/h)
- Complement: 30 officers, 282 ratings
- Sensors & processing systems: 1 x MR-500 and 1 x MR-310 Angara-A air/surface search radars, 1 x MRP-11-12, 2 x MRP-13-14 Uspekh-U and 1 x MRP-15-16 Zaliv reconnaissance radars, 1 x Volga navigation radar, 1 x Binom-1134, 2 x 4R90 Yatagan, 1 x MR-103 Bars, 1 x Grozna-1134 and 1 x Burya-1134 fire control systems, 3 x Nickel-KM and 2 x Khrom-KM IFF, 1 x ARP-50R radio direction finder, 1 x MG-312M Titan and 1 x GAS-311 Vychegda sonars, 1 x MG-26 Khosta underwater communication system, 1 x MI-110R and 1 x MI-110K anti-subrmarine search stations, 1 x Planshet-1134 combat information control systems
- Electronic warfare & decoys: 2 x Gurzuf ESM radar system; 1 x ZIF-121 launcher for PK-2 decoy rockets
- Armament: 4 × KT-35-1134 P-35 launchers with 4 4K44 (SS-N-3 'Shaddock’) anti-ship missiles (2x2); 4 × ZIF-102 M-1 launchers with 64 V-600 (SA-N-1 ‘Goa’) surface to air missiles (2x2); 4 × 57 mm (2 in) AK-725 guns (2×2); 2 × RBU-1000 Smerch-3 Anti-Submarine rockets; 2 × RBU-6000 Smerch-2 Anti-Submarine rockets; 10 × 533 mm (21 in) PTA-53-1134 torpedo tubes (2x5) for 10 53-65, 53-65K or SET-65 torpedoes
- Aircraft carried: 1 Kamov Ka-25 'Hormone-A' or KA-25T 'Hormone-B'
- Aviation facilities: Hangar and helipad

Admiral Zozulya (Russian: Адмирал Зозуля) was the lead ship of the Soviet Navy Project 1134 Admiral Zozulya-class Large Anti-submarine Ship (Russian: Большой Противолодочный Корабль, BPK) also known as the Kresta I Class guided missile cruisers. Launched in 1965, the ship was reclassified a Large Rocket Ship (Russian: Ракетные крейсера проекта, RKR) in 1977. Admiral Zozulya served primarily in the Northern Fleet during the Cold War, transferring to the Russian Navy at the dissolution of the Soviet Navy, and was decommissioned in 1994 after nearly thirty years of service.

== Design and development ==
=== Design ===
Envisioned as the first of a large class of a more balanced follow-on ships to the specialist anti-ship Project 58 class, Admiral Zozulya was larger, displacing 5,340 tonnes (5,260 long tons; 5,890 short tons) standard and 7,170 tonnes (7,060 long tons; 7,900 short tons) full load, and stretching 156.2 m (512 ft) in length. (Note: NATO estimates vary. For example, the US Navy quoted 6,140 tons standard displacement, 7,600 tons full load and 155.6 m length.) Beam was 16.8 m (55 ft 1 in) and draught 5.6 m (18 ft 4 in). The hull was made of steel upon which was mounted a large aluminium-magnesium alloy superstructure dominated by a radar complex including MR-500, MR-310 Angara-A, MRP-11-12, MRP-13-14 Uspekh-U and MRP-15-16 Zaliv search radars and a Volga navigation radar.

Power was provided by two TV-12 steam turbines, fuelled by four KVN-98/64 boilers and driving two fixed pitch screws that provided 46,000 horsepower (34,000 kW). The ship carried 1,690 tonnes (1,660 long tons; 1,860 short tons) of fuel which gave a range of 10,500 nmi (19,446 km) at 14 knots (26 km/h). Maximum design speed was 34 knots (63 km/h). Electricity was provided by a TD-760 driven off steam drawn from the main boilers which powered a 380 V AC circuit at a frequency of 50 Hz.

=== Armament ===
Admiral Zozulya was originally intended to mount the P-500 Bazalt (NATO reporting name SS-N-12 'Sandbox') but protracted development meant that instead the same 4K44 missiles (SS-N-3 'Shaddock') as the Project 50 warships mounted were retained. However, they were launched from two specially designed twin KT-35-1134 P-35 launchers mounted midships. Similarly, anti-aircraft defence was to be based around the new M-11 Shtorm (SA-N-3 'Goblet') system but this did not become operational until 1969. Instead, protection was enhanced by mounting two twin ZIF-102 M-1 Volna-M launchers, one forward and the other aft, and up to 64 4K91 (SA-N-1 'Goa') missiles, which was supplemented by two twin 57 mm (2 in) AK-725 guns.

Defence against submarines was provided by two quintuple 533 mm (21 in) torpedo launchers, a pair of six-barrelled RBU-1000 Smerch-3 launchers for 300 mm (12 in) anti-submarine rockets and a pair of twelve-barrelled RBU-6000 Smerch-2 launchers for 213 mm (8 in) anti-submarine rockets. A vastly improved anti-submarine sensor suite was also fitted, with MG-312M Titan and GAS-311 Vychegda sonars, the MG-26 Khosta underwater communication system and both MI-110R and MI-110K anti-submarine search stations. Fire control was directed by two 4R90 Yatagan units along with Binom-1134, MR-103 Bars, Grozna-1134 and Burya-1134 fire control systems along with a ARP-50R radio direction finder. Threat response was coordinated with a Planshet-1134 combat information control system.

The ship was equipped with an aft landing pad and hangar for a ranging Kamov Ka-25 helicopter, the first installed on a Soviet cruiser.

In the early 1970s, Admiral Zozulya was upgraded with a MR-212 Vaygach navigation radar added and the missiles updated to 4M44. The ship underwent extensive modernisation between 1985 and 1991, including the addition of four AK-630 close-in weapon systems, with their attendant fire control radars, installed near the bridge to improve anti-missile defence.

=== Development ===
Admiral Zozulya was approved by Nikita Khrushchev as part of Sergey Gorshkov's buildup of the Soviet Navy. The vessel was laid down on 26 July 1964 at A.A. Zhdanov in Leningrad with yard number 791, and launched on 17 October 1965. The total cost of construction was 32 million rubles.

== Service ==
Admiral Zozulya began testing on 15 February 1967, covering 15,615 nautical miles (28,919 km) in 995 running hours, and was completed on 8 October 1967. Almost immediately, the vessel formed part of a naval parade in honour of the 50th anniversary of the October Revolution on 7 November. On 18 January 1968, the ship was attached to the 120th Missile Ship Brigade (Russian: бригада ракетных кораблей) of the Northern Fleet based at Severomorsk, remaining part of that unit until 9 October 1986. While serving in the Brigade, the vessel was awarded the Navy Prize for Air Defence (Russian: ПВО). The first launch of a P-35 missile was in October 1968.

Throughout 1968 and 1969, the ship took part in exercises until 1 December 1969 when Admiral Zozulya was dispatched to the Mediterranean Sea to operate with Egyptian armed forces and then later sailed in the Atlantic Ocean on 30 April 1970 after taking part in Okean-70. The ship returned to Leningrad for repairs and modernisation in November 1971, re-entering service in June 1974. Between 1 June and 1 December 1975, the vessel undertook operations in the Mediterranean and Atlantic with Admiral Isakov, during which the Ka-25 helicopter crashed, with a single fatality, on 11 September.

On 3 August 1978, the vessel was renamed a Large Rocket Ship (Russian: Ракетные крейсера проекта, RKR). Shortly afterwards, in September 1978, Admiral Zozulya joined Admiral Makarov to monitor NATO exercise Northern Wedding, later taking part in the Soviet exercise Atlantika-84 between 31 March and 8 April 1984. During modernisation, the vessel was assigned to the Baltic Fleet, joining the 12th Missile Ship Division in May 1992. However, Admiral Zozulya did not serve long in that capacity and was decommissioned on 29 September 1994 and was broken up in the Baltic in 1995.

== Pennant numbers ==
Pennant number	Date
581	1967
560	1968
542	1972
558	
569	
093	
297	1977
072	1978
060	1985
052	1990

== Bibliography ==
- Averin, A.B. (2007). Адмиралы и маршалы. Корабли проектов 1134 и 1134А [Admirals and Marshals: Ships Project 1134 and 1134A] (in Russian). Moscow: Voennaya Kniga. ISBN 978-5-90286-316-8.
- Hampshire, Edward (2017). Soviet Cold War Guided Missile Cruisers. Oxford: Osprey Publishing. ISBN 978-1-472-81740-2.
- Holm, Michael (2016). "Project 1134: Kresta I class". Soviet Armed Forces 1945–1991. Archived from the original on 6 January 2016.
- Kostev, George G. (2004). The Soviet and Russian Navy, 1945-2000trans-title=Военно-морской флот Советского Союза и России, 1945-2000. Moscow: Peterof. ISBN 978-5-87579-038-6.
- Prézelin, Bernard; Baker, A.D. (1990). The Naval Institute Guide to Combat Fleets of the World 1990/91. Annapolis, Maryland: Naval Institute Press. ISBN 0-87021-250-8.
- Sondhaus, Lawrence (2004). Navies in Modern World History. London: Reaktion. ISBN 9781861892027.
- Tucker-Jones, Anthony (2015). Soviet Cold War Weaponry : Aircraft, Warships and Missiles. Barnsley: Pen and Sword. ISBN 978-1-47382-361-7.
