= Fyodor Zozulya =

Fyodor Vladimirovich Zozulya
- Zozulya in the early 1960s
- Born: 9 November [O.S. 27 October] 1907; Stavropol, Russian Empire
- Died: 21 April 1964 (aged 56); Moscow, Soviet Union
- Burial place: Novodevichy Cemetery
- Military career
- Allegiance: Soviet Union
- Branch: Soviet Navy
- Service years: 1925–1964
- Rank: Admiral
- Commands: Caspian Flotilla; 8th Fleet; Krylov Naval Academy of Shipbuilding and Armaments
- Conflicts: World War II
- Awards: Order of Lenin; Order of the Red Banner (3); Order of the Red Star

Fyodor Vladimirovich Zozulya (Russian: Фёдор Владимирович Зозуля; 9 November [O.S. 27 October] 1907 – 21 April 1964) was an admiral of the Soviet Navy.

Zozulya spent most of his career as a staff officer, serving as deputy chief of the Baltic Fleet after Operation Barbarossa began, and as chief of staff of the White Sea Flotilla between 1941 and 1943. He commanded the Caspian Flotilla between 1944 and 1945, and the 8th Fleet during the late 1940s. After a stint as commander of the Krylov Naval Academy of Shipbuilding and Armaments in the early 1950s, Zozulya served on the Main Naval Staff, which he was chief of from 1958 until his death.

== Early life and prewar service ==
Born on 9 November 1907 in Stavropol to Ukrainian parents, Zozulya entered the Soviet Navy (then the Naval Forces of the Red Army) in 1925 as a student at the M.V. Frunze Naval School from October of that year. After graduating from the school in May 1928, he became a naval cadet aboard the destroyer Kalinin and in September 1928 became a platoon commander of the a naval crew of the Baltic Fleet. Zozulya served as navigator of the training ship Komsomolets from January 1929 and the destroyer Uritsky from February 1930. In April 1931 he became the senior navigator of the latter, and entered the Naval Faculty of the Voroshilov Naval Academy in December 1931. Upon graduation in November 1934, Zozulya became assistant to the chief of the sector dealing with the Black Sea theatre and flotillas of the naval department of the 1st Directorate of the General Staff.

In January 1935 he became assistant to the chief of the 1st department of the 1st Directorate. He served as an assistant to the chief of a department of the Operations Directorate of the General Staff from March 1935, as senior assistant to the same department chief from August 1937, and chief of the department from June 1938. After serving as chief of staff of the Caspian Flotilla from April to November 1939, Zozulya became deputy chief of staff of the Baltic Fleet in November 1939. In this position, he participated in the occupation of Koivisto Island during the Winter War. From July 1940, he served as chief of staff of the Kronstadt Naval Base.

== World War II ==
After Operation Barbarossa began in June 1941, Zozulya continued as chief of staff of the naval base, and in August became the deputy chief of staff of the Baltic Fleet. In this capacity, he helped ensure the evacuation of forces of the Baltic Fleet from Tallinn to Kronstadt. He led the sending to assistance to damaged ships on Gogland, the evacuation of stranded personnel and evacuated civilians from the island, and the landing of naval infantry in the Petergof area. In late September he commanded a detachment of sailors that ensued the crossing of the troops of the Neva Operational Group in the area of Moskovskoy Dubrovki.

Zozulya became chief of staff of the White Sea Flotilla, defending communications in the White, Barents, and Kara Seas, in December 1941. His performance in this position was assessed by his superiors as "skillfully providing and organizing military operations," and the White Sea Flotilla was able to provide for the unhindered movement of Soviet and Allied transports in the White Sea. According to an award citation, Zozulya, "never, even in difficult conditions, lost his temper or composure, displaying personal courage in the fight against the fascists." He participated in the deployment of the Novaya Zemlya Naval Base.

Zozulya became deputy chief of the Operations Directorate of the Main Naval Staff in July 1943, and commander-in-chief of the Caspian Flotilla in September 1944, having been promoted to kontr-admiral on 21 July 1944.

== Postwar ==
After the end of the war, Zozulya continued to command the flotilla. After a brief return to the Baltic Fleet as its chief of staff in January 1946, he transferred to serve in the same position with the 8th Fleet when the Baltic Fleet was split in February 1946. A year later, Zozulya became chief of the Operations Directorate of the Main Naval Staff, and in July 1947 became commander-in-chief of the 8th Fleet. He was promoted to vitse-admiral on 11 May 1949. After serving as chief of the Krylov Naval Academy of Shipbuilding and Armaments from February 1950, he became deputy chief of the Main Naval Staff in September 1953, rising to chief of the Main Naval Staff and first deputy commander-in-chief of the navy in February 1958 after being promoted to admiral on 8 August 1955. As chief of the Main Naval Staff, Zozulya encouraged his subordinates to not rely on close supervision from superiors, in contrast to the top-down style of his predecessor, Vitaly Fokin, and was praised for his management ability by Navy Commander-in-Chief Admiral Sergey Gorshkov. Zozulya held the position until his death in Moscow on 21 April 1964. He was buried at the Novodevichy Cemetery.

== Honors and awards ==
Zozulya was a recipient of the following awards and decorations:

- Order of Lenin (1950)
- Order of the Red Banner (1943, 1945, 1956)
- Order of the Red Star (1940, 1944)
- Commander of the Order of the British Empire (1944)

The Kresta I-class cruiser Admiral Zozulya was named in his honour.
