= Kresta I-class cruiser =

Class of Missile cruisers built by USSR

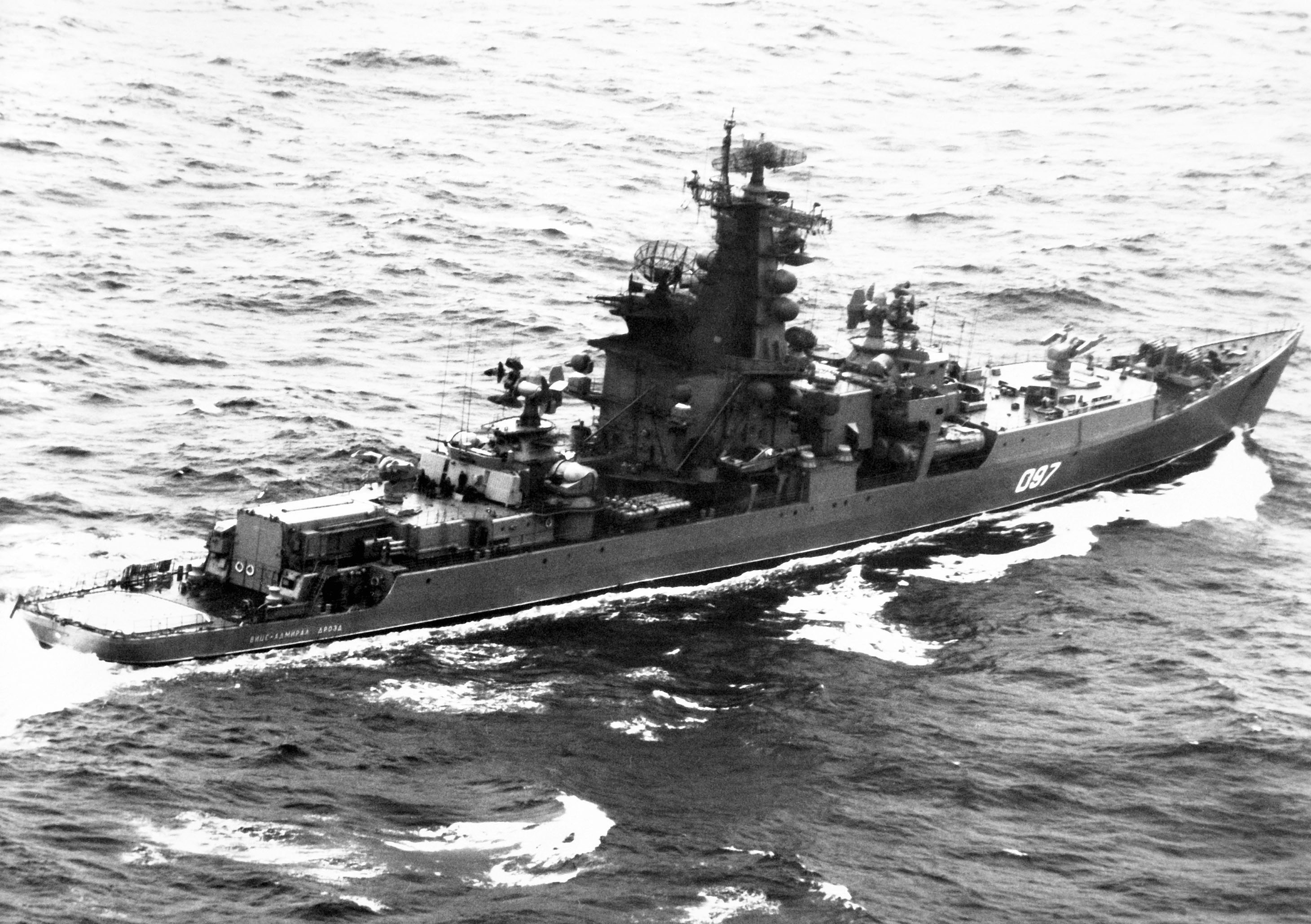
- Vitse-Admiral Drozd in 1986

Class overview
- Name: Kresta I class
- Builders: Zhdanov Shipyard, Leningrad
- Operators: Soviet Navy; Russian Navy
- Preceded by: Kynda class
- Succeeded by: Kresta II class
- Built: 1964–1967
- In commission: 1967–1994
- Planned: 35
- Completed: 4
- Canceled: 31
- Retired: 4

General characteristics
- Type: Cruiser
- Displacement: 6,000 tons standard; 7,500 tons full load
- Length: 159 m (521 ft 8 in)
- Beam: 17 m (55 ft 9 in)
- Draught: 6 m (19 ft 8 in)
- Propulsion: 2 steam turbines; 68,000–75,000 kW (91,000–100,000 shp)
- Speed: 34 knots (63 km/h; 39 mph)
- Range: 10,500 nautical miles (19,400 km; 12,100 mi) at 14 knots (26 km/h; 16 mph)
- Complement: 343-360
- Sensors & processing systems: Radar: MR-500 Kliver air search; MR-302 Rubka; MR-310 Angara; Don navigation; Sonar: MG-312; MG-26; Fire control: Yatagan (SA-N-1); MR-103 (AK-725); Binom P35 Progress; Others: Khrom-2M IFF
- Armament: 2 × twin SS-N-3 'Shaddock' anti-ship missiles; 2 × twin SA-N-1 'Goa' surface-to-air missile launchers (44 missiles); 2 × twin 57 mm (2.2 in)/70 AK-725 anti-aircraft guns; 2 × quintuple 533 mm (21 in) torpedo tubes
- Aircraft carried: 1 × Ka-25 series helicopter
- Aviation facilities: Helipad and hangar

The Kresta I class, Soviet designation Project 1134 Berkut (golden eagle), was a class of guided missile cruiser built in the Soviet Union for the Soviet Navy. The ships were designed for a surface warfare role, but Soviet priorities were changed to an anti-submarine role and only four ships were built in the original anti-ship configuration. They were followed by the Kresta II class, an anti-submarine warfare variant.

== Design ==
Though considerably larger, more effective and reliable than the previous Soviet cruiser class, the Kynda class, the Kresta I surface warfare cruisers carried only half as many Shaddock launch tubes and one-fourth the total number of missiles. Initially it was planned to fit the SS-N-12 Sandbox (P-500 Bazalt) missile but the protracted development of this missile led to the older SS-N-3 being shipped. The self-defence armament was considerably increased as were command and communications facilities.

The Kresta Is could launch four SS-N-3b SLCMs and 44 SA-N-1 surface-to-air missiles with two twin launchers fore and aft, and had ten 533 mm (21 in) torpedo tubes. A single Ka-25 Hormone B helicopter was carried for antisubmarine warfare and perform mid-course corrections for the cruise missile.

== Ships ==
The initial plan was for a single squadron of seven ships armed with long range missiles and two squadrons of fourteen ships armed with shorter range missiles. Only four ships were built before production switched to the anti-submarine variant the Kresta II class.

All the ships were built by the Zhdanov Shipyard in Leningrad.

Name	Russian	Laid down	Launched	Commissioned	Decommissioned
Admiral Zozulya	Адмирал Зозуля	26 July 1964	17 October 1965	8 October 1967	15 December 1994
Vladivostok	Владивосток	24 December 1964	1 August 1966	1 August 1969	1 January 1991
Vitse-Admiral Drozd	Вице-Адмирал Дрозд	26 October 1965	18 November 1966	27 December 1968	1 July 1990
Sevastopol	Севастополь	8 June 1966	28 April 1967	25 September 1969	15 December 1989

== See also ==
- List of ships of the Soviet Navy
- List of ships of Russia by project number
